= František Griglák =

Slovak guitarist

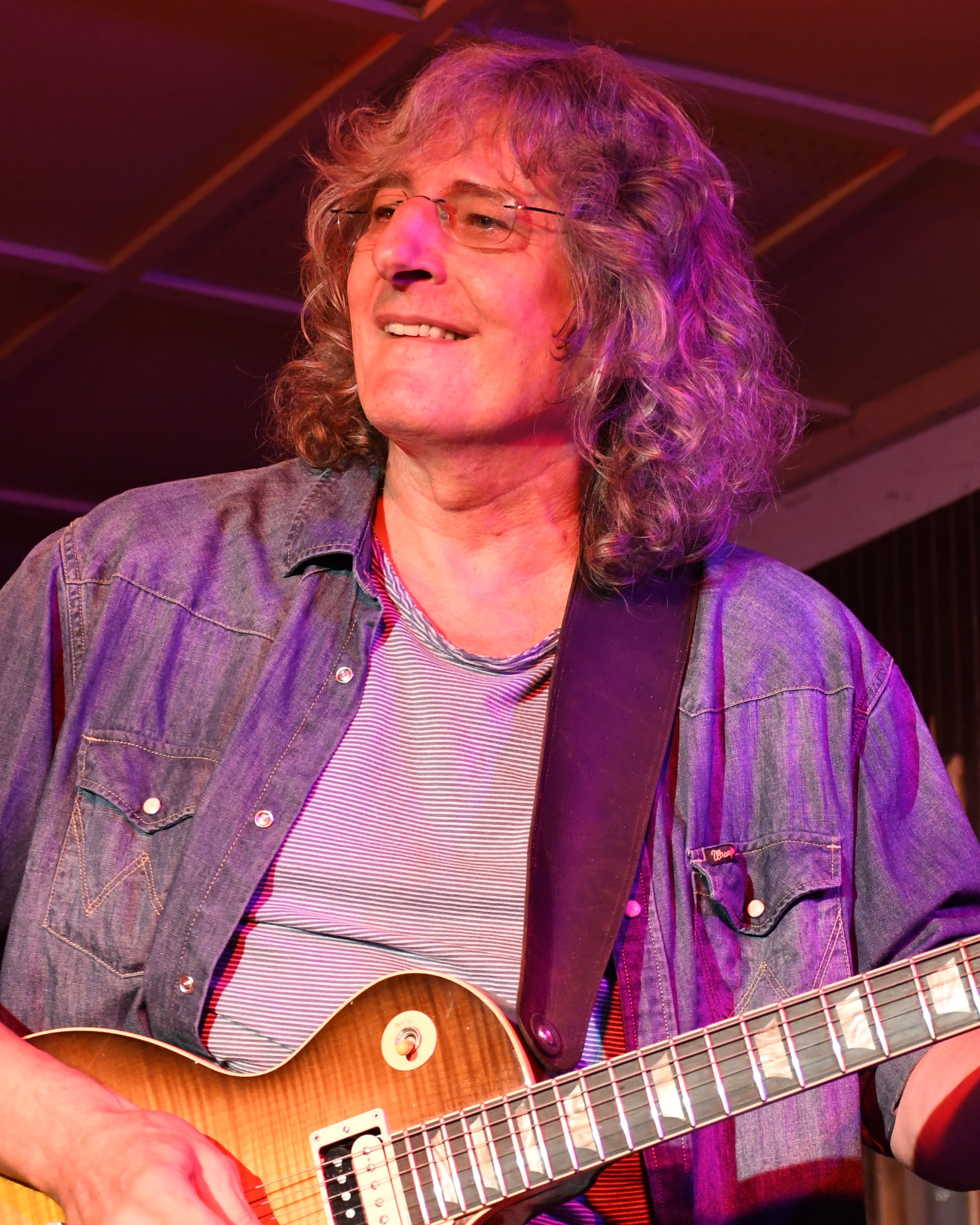
- Griglák performing with Prúdy in 2018

Background information
- Born: 13 August 1953 (age 72); Bratislava, Czechoslovakia
- Genres: Progressive rock; jazz fusion; psychedelic rock
- Occupations: Musician; songwriter; composer
- Instrument: Guitar
- Labels: Opus; Supraphon

František "Fero" Griglák (born 13 August 1953) is a Slovak guitarist and composer associated with progressive rock and jazz fusion. He has been a band member of many Slovak bands in these genres, including Collegium Musicum, Fermáta, and Prúdy.

== Biography ==
=== Childhood ===
František Griglák was born in Bratislava, his father's family originating from the area of Spiš. His parents signed him up for piano lessons at the age of five, but he grew dissatisfied with the instrument and later switched to guitar. He was gifted a Spanish model by his grandfather in the seventh grade. He was exposed to the rock and roll of the West during his teenage years and developed an admiration for bands like The Beatles and The Shadows.

=== Musical beginnings ===
In the late 1960s, inspired by Dežo Ursiny's Slovak big-beat group The Soulmen, he founded the band Inside Of Fire with his school friend, which performed covers of songs by the artists such as Jimi Hendrix and The Kinks. He began writing original songs at this time, whose demos attracted the attention of fellow Slovak guitarist and singer Pavol Hammel. After the band Hammel was in, Prúdy, dismantled following the recording of their unreleased second LP, he recruited the 17-year-old Griglák to perform on the album Pavol Hammel a Prúdy (1970), his first publicly released recording and the beginning of his professional career. Griglák later commented that his style of playing on the record was influenced by guitarist Jimmy Page of Led Zeppelin.

In early 1971, Griglák was approached by Marián Varga of the band Collegium Musicum after their guitarist Rastislav Vacho had quit to continue his education. Griglák's audition was a success, and the new lineup was established. Collegium Musicum ironed out several compositions during live performances that later became the tracks of their double LP, Konvergencie (1971). Some of Griglák's own compositions were featured on the album, including the movement "Tvoj sneh" ('Your snow') on the song Pieseň z Kolovrátku ('Songs from the Spinning Wheel'). He continued to tour with Collegium Musicum until 1972, when he teamed up with keyboardist Tomáš Berko to establish a new jazz-rock band named Fermáta, with bassist Laco Lučenič and drummer Pavol Kozma joining thereafter.

=== Later career ===
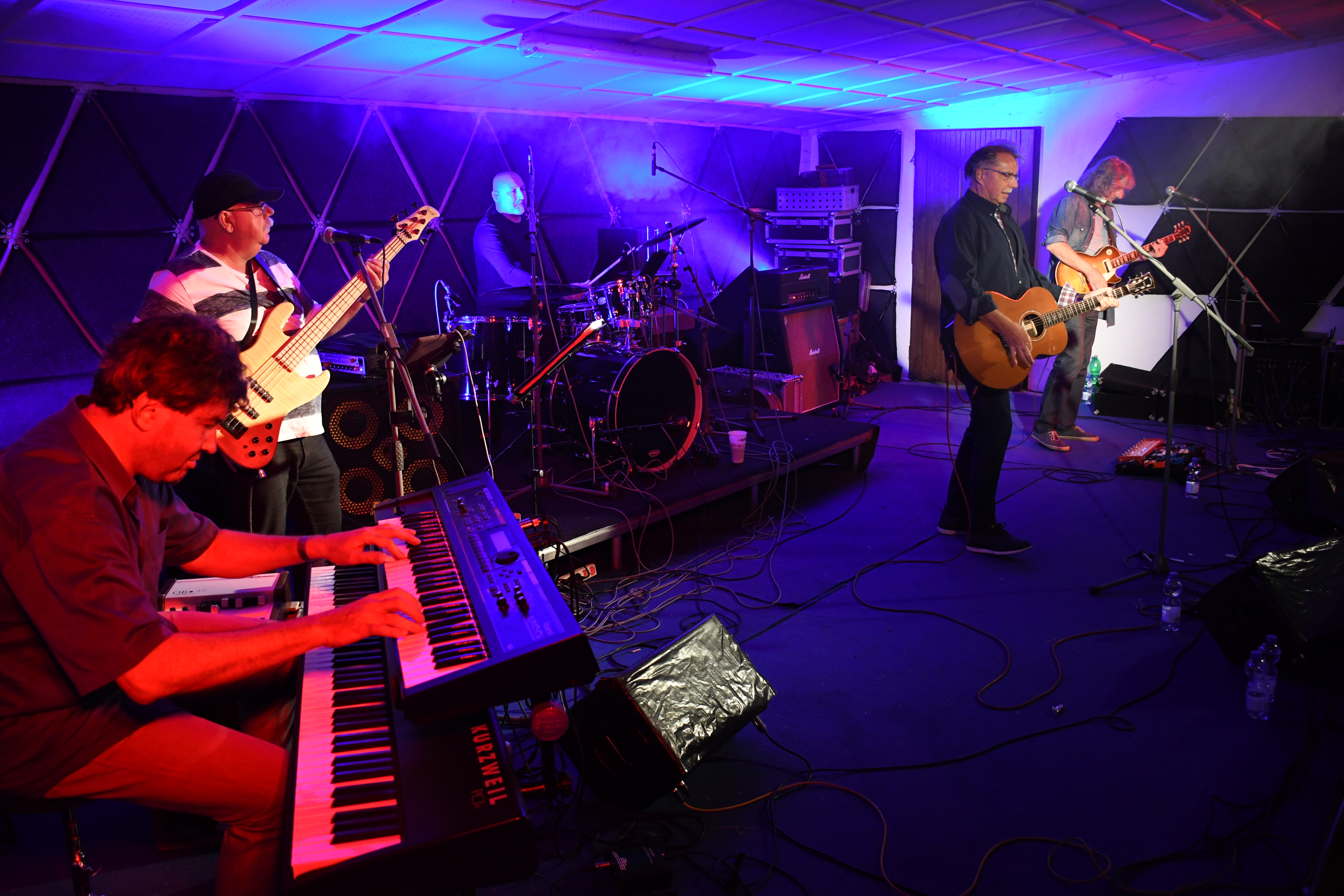
Fero Griglák (far right) and Pavol Hammel (second from right) performing together with Prúdy in 2018.

In 2010, Griglák reunited with Collegium Musicum to record the live album Speak, Memory (2010). He also performed with Pavol Hammel for a Prúdy memorial concert at the Gopass Arena in 2018.
