= Dušan Hájek =

Slovak drummer (born 1946)

- Born: 21 July 1946 (age 80); Bratislava, Czechoslovakia
- Genres: Progressive rock; jazz-rock; psychedelic rock
- Occupation: Musician
- Instrument: Drums
- Years active: 1967–2006
- Labels: Opus; Supraphon

Dušan Hájek (born 21 July 1946) is a Slovak drummer and percussionist. He is known for his work in the big-beat era of Czechoslovak popular music, specializing in progressive rock and jazz-rock. Hájek has been a member of Collegium Musicum, Prúdy, Modus, The Soulmen, Banket, and others. He has also been a supporting musician for solo records by big names like Pavol Hammel, Miroslav Žbirka, Marika Gombitová, and Peter Lipa. He has since retired from the music industry. He was referred to by contemporary guitarist Peci Uherčík as a "[...] musical legend from the days of big-beat."

== Early life and career ==
Dušan Hájek was born in Bratislava.

His career began with playing for The Blues Five from 1967 to 1969, alongside Peter Lipa, Rastislav Vacho and Fedor Letňan. In this line-up, the band won the Discovery of the Year award at the second Czechoslovak Beat Festival in Prague in 1968. Hájek was a late addition to the group Prúdy, joining in 1969, the same year it dismantled. He subsequently teamed up with bandmates Marián Varga and Fedor Frešo to establish the primary lineup of Collegium Musicum in 1969. He was a credited as a co-writer on many tracks and performed with the band until their penultimate studio album, Continuo (1978).

He was a frequent collaborator with singer-songwriters Pavol Hammel and Miroslav Žbirka throughout the early 1980s. He began using an electronic drum kit after joining Banket, as heard on their debut 1986 album Bioelektrovízia. Having retired from music in 2006, he was replaced in the Collegium Musicum reunion concerts by Martin Valihora.

Hájek's playing style is said to have been influenced by jazz. He used a drum kit produced by Amati Kraslice in his early days, and later purchased drums from the Rogers corporation, a kit synonymous with much of the "classic rock" sound in the United States. In addition to possessing extra toms, his kit was adorned with various percussion instruments, including woodblocks, cowbell, jingle bells, and small gongs among others, leading to his idiosyncratic sound that can be heard on records like Konvergencie (1971). After leaving Collegium Musicum, he played with transparent plastic drums manufactured by Ludwig. In the 1980s, he experimented with electronic drums before switching back to an acoustic kit.

In 2026, the Department of Cultural and Philosophical Studies of Slovak Matica awarded him an honorary distinction for his lifelong contribution to Slovak musical culture with European and global reach.

== Discography ==
=== with Collegium Musicum ===
- 1970 - Hommage à J.S. Bach
- 1970 - Collegium Musicum
- 1971 - Konvergencie
- 1972 - Zelená pošta (with Pavol Hammel)
- 1973 - Live
- 1975 - Marián Varga & Collegium Musicum
- 1978 - Continuo
- 1997 - Collegium Musicum '97

=== with Pavol Hammel ===
- 1977 - Na II. Programe Sna (with Marián Varga and Radim Hladik)
- 1980 - Faust A Margaréty
- 1981 - Čas Malín
- 1981 - Remote Barber's Shop
- 1982 - Circus Summer
- 1983 - Dnes Už Viem

=== with Miroslav Žbirka ===
- 1980 - Doktor Sen
- 1982 - Light Of My Life
- 1982 - Sezónne Lásky
- 1983 - Roky A Dni
- 1984 - Dear Boy
- 1992 - 20 Naj...

=== with Modus ===
- 1980 - Balíček Snov

=== with Marika Gombitová ===
- 1983 - Mince Na Dne Fontán
- 1985 - My Friend the Tree

=== with Banket ===
- 1986 - Bioelektrovízia

=== with Robo Grigorov ===
- 1987 - Robo Grigorov – Midi
- 1988 - Nohy

=== with Peter Lipa & Luboš Andršt's Blues Band ===
- 1987 - Škrtni, Co Se Nehodí
- 1988 - Blues Office
