= Dežo Ursiny =

Slovak musician, composer, and filmmaker (1947–1995)

- Dežo Ursiny
- Born: Dezider Ursiny; 4 October 1947; Bratislava, Czechoslovakia
- Died: 2 May 1995 (aged 47); Bratislava, Slovakia
- Education: VŠMU
- Occupations: Singer-songwriter; musician; composer; film director
- Awards: ZAI Award (1990, 1995); Pribina Cross, 2nd class (2021)
- Musical career
- Genres: Rock; progressive rock; jazz rock
- Instruments: Guitar; vocals
- Years active: 1964–1995
- Formerly of: Fontána; Jolana; The Beatmen; The Soulmen; The New Soulmen; Provisorium
- Website: dezoursiny.rocks

Dezider Ursiny, better known as Dežo Ursiny (Slovak pronunciation: [ˈdeʐɔ ˈursini]; 4 October 1947 – 2 May 1995) was a Slovak musician, composer, and filmmaker. In the 1960s, he was a member of the Beatmen and the Soulmen, two bands who pioneered an Eastern European style of music called big beat, which combined rock and roll, jazz, and twist when those styles were banned in the Eastern Bloc. He subsequently launched a solo career, usually in collaboration with the poet Ivan Štrpka, and composed music for a number of films. Ursiny died of oral cancer on 2 May 1995, aged 47.

In 2019, Ursiny was ranked 83rd in the RTVS Greatest Slovak poll. In 2021, he was awarded the Pribina Cross, 2nd class, by the President of Slovakia, for "extraordinary services to the cultural development of the Slovak Republic".

== Biography ==
=== Early life and Beatmen ===
Dezider Ursiny was born and grew up in Bratislava, Czechoslovakia (present-day Slovakia). He began playing guitar at the age of 11, and during his studies at the Central Industrial School of Electrical Engineering in Bratislava, he was a member of the bands Fontána and Jolana. In 1964, he joined the Beatmen, who had formed shortly before, as lead guitarist and vocalist. The group released two singles, and after being named the first musical group from the Eastern Bloc to perform beyond the Iron Curtain, with a 1966 performance in Munich, as well as opening for the English rock band Manfred Mann in Bratislava, they emigrated to West Germany, though Ursiny chose to stay in Czechoslovakia.

=== Soulmen, New Soulmen, and Provisorium ===
In 1967, he formed the Soulmen with bassist Fedor Frešo and drummer Dušan Hájek, a band whose style of music was similar to the Beatmen, consisting of a blend of rock and big beat. In December 1967, they performed at the first Czechoslovak Beat Festival, held at Lucerna, in Prague, winning first place in a contest of performers. They released one four-track EP, before splitting up the following year.

Also in 1967, Ursiny applied to study film and dramaturgy at the Academy of Performing Arts in Bratislava; he graduated in 1973.

In 1968, Ursiny formed the New Soulmen, with Ján Lehotský on keyboards, Fedor Letňan on bass, and Peter Mráz on drums. They recorded two songs in November but broke up in early 1969, without releasing any material.

In 1970, Ursiny founded the band Provisorium with keyboardist Jaro Filip—who became his first lifelong collaborator. The group's lineup changed twice, and they only played two shows before splitting up. Ursiny and Filip recorded an album with bassist Vladimír Kulhánek and drummer Jaroslav Erno Šedivý from Flamengo, titled Dežo Ursiny & Provisorium, sung entirely in English and released in 1973.

=== Film music and solo career ===
In 1975, Ursiny checked himself, along with a friend, into a psychiatric hospital, in order to avoid performing military service. He later met the poet Ivan Štrpka, who would become his second longtime collaborator. He composed music for Juraj Jakubisko's 1977 short film, Bubeník Červeného kríža, and Július Matula's Řeknem si to příští léto. Around this time, Ursiny switched to singing in Slovak, and in 1978, he released his first solo album, Pevnina detstva, with Štrpka writing lyrics. In 1979, he followed it with Nové mapy ticha, an album credited to him and Štrpka. His backing band was called Burčiak, and they were credited on his third studio album, Modrý vrch; he in turn was credited on the band's 1981 album, Pop scop. In 1981, Ursiny wrote music for the television musical Neberte nám princeznú, whose songs were performed by Marika Gombitová, Miroslav Žbirka, and Marie Rottrová.

In 1983, Ursiny and Štrpka issued the album 4/4, with Prognóza as their backing band. This was followed a year later by Bez počasia. Zelená came out in 1986 and Na ceste domov in 1987. Ursiny also composed music for the musical Niekto ako ja, and he co-wrote and directed the film Vôňa života.

=== Illness, final recordings, and death ===
In 1989, Ursiny was diagnosed with oral cancer, from which he partly recovered a year later after seeking alternative treatment in the Philippines and undergoing a course of chemotherapy. In 1991, he released the movie O rakovine a nádeji, a documentary about his fight with the illness. In 1992, he published the double album Ten istý tanec. In 1994, his cancer returned, and he refused further treatment. He released his last album, Príbeh, the same year. In December, he played his final concert, in Prague. He died of cancer on 2 May 1995, aged 47.

In 1997 and 2000, two compilation albums were released, titled Pevniny a vrchy and Pevniny a vrchy 2, respectively, which contained a collection of Ursiny's solo recordings as well as a number of rarities from the Beatmen, the New Soulmen, and Provisorium.

In December 2008, a film directed by Petr Krištúfek, entitled Momentky was screened at the Bratislava International Film Festival, detailing Ursiny's life and career. The film featured interviews with Ursiny's second wife, Soňa Ursinyová; his sister, Elena Ursinyová; his last girlfriend, Zdenka Krejčová; his two sons; as well Fedor Frešo, Ivan Štrpka, Marián Varga, Andrej Šeban, and a number of his former friends and collaborators.

== Awards and recognition ==
In 1991, Ursiny won the lifetime contribution award, the so-called Grand Prix, at the 1st ZAI Awards. In 1995, he won Album of the Year for Príbeh at the 5th ZAI Awards.

In Radio and Television of Slovakia's 2019 Greatest Slovak poll, Ursiny was ranked 83rd.

On 27 June 2021, he was posthumously awarded the Pribina Cross, 2nd class, by then-President of Slovakia, Zuzana Čaputová, for "extraordinary services to the cultural development of the Slovak Republic".

== Discography ==
=== with the Beatmen ===
Singles

- "Safely Arrived" / "The Enchanted Lie" (1965)
- "Break It" / "Let's Make a Summer" (1965)
- "Stand Up and Go" / "As You Love Me" (1966)

=== with the Soulmen ===
EP

- Sample of Happiness/Wake Up/I Wish I Were/Baby Do Not Cry (1968)

=== Solo ===
Studio albums

- Pevnina detstva (1978)
- Nové mapy ticha (1979) with Ivan Štrpka
- Modrý vrch (1981) with Ivan Štrpka
- 4/4 (1983) with Ivan Štrpka
- Bez počasia (1984) with Ivan Štrpka
- Zelená (1986) with Ivan Štrpka
- Na ceste domov (1987) with Ivan Štrpka
- Momentky (1990) with Ivan Štrpka
- Do tla (1991) with Ivan Štrpka
- Ten istý tanec (1992) with Ivan Štrpka
- Príbeh (1994) with Ivan Štrpka

English-language albums

- The Blue Hill English version of Modrý vrch (1983)
- Without Weather (1984) English version of Bez počasia (1984)
- Green English version of Zelená (1986)
- On the Way Home English version of Na ceste domov (1987)

Compilations

- Pevniny a vrchy (1997)
- Pevniny a vrchy 2 (2000)

Live albums

- Posledný príbeh live (2000)
- Tisíc izieb (2014)

DVDs

- Dežo Ursiny 70 (2018)

Singles

- "Hra je hra/Stá pieseň o daždi" (1980)

=== Other albums ===
- Dežo Ursiny & Provisorium (1973)

== See also ==
- The 100 Greatest Slovak Albums of All Time
