= Blue Effect =

Czech rock band

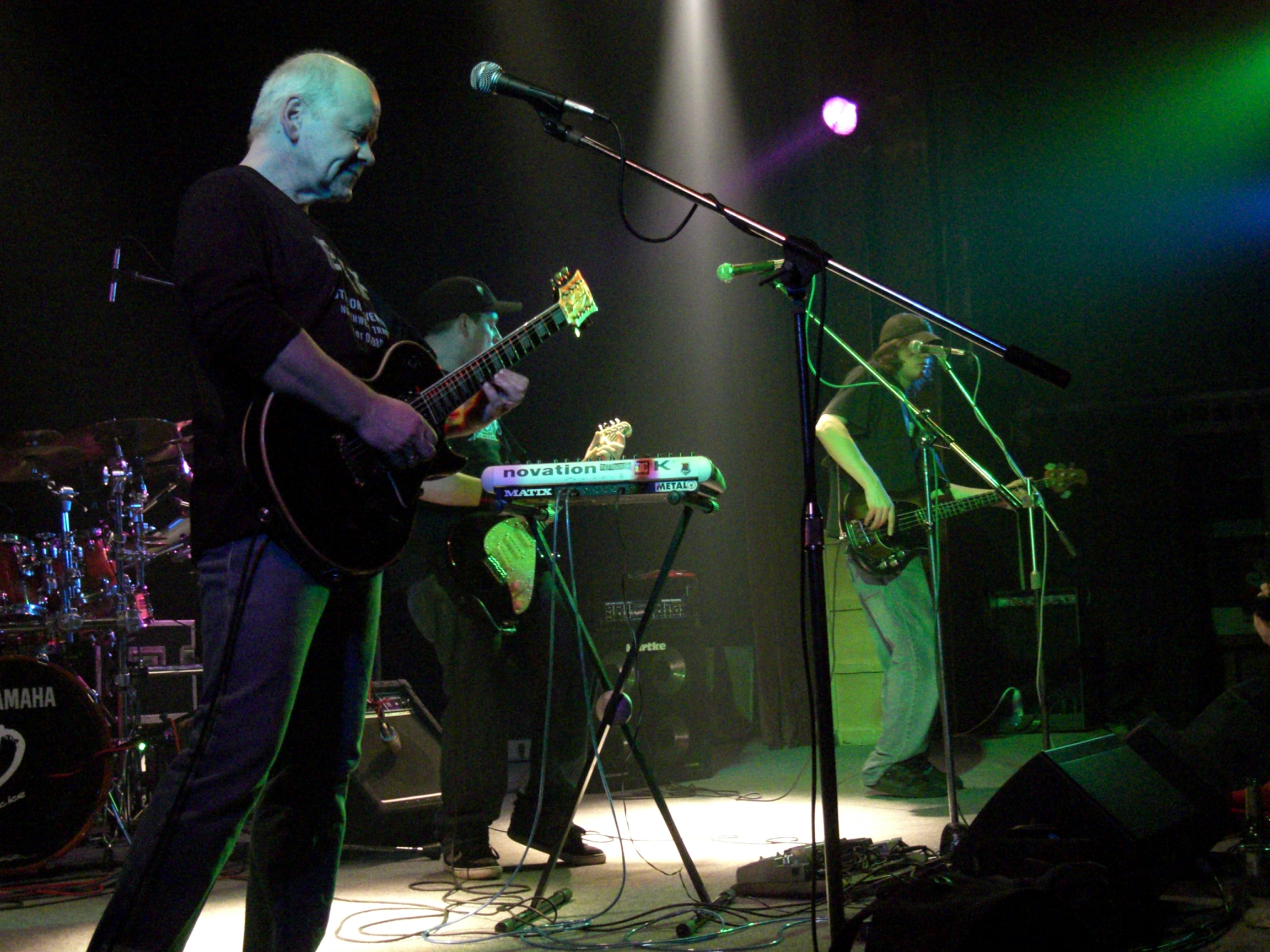
- Blue Effect performing in 2007

Background information
- Origin: Prague, Czechoslovakia
- Genres: Art rock; jazz rock; blues rock
- Years active: 1968–1990, 2004–2016
- Labels: Supraphon; Panton
- Past members: Radim Hladík; Vladimír Mišík; Jiří Kozel; Vlado Čech; Miloš Svoboda; Lešek Semelka; Josef Kůstka; Oldřich Veselý; Fedor Frešo; Oldřich Kellner; Luboš Pospíšil; Luboš Manda; Radek Křemenák; Josef Havlíček; David Koller; Jan Křížek; Václav Zima; Vojtěch Říha

Blue Effect was a Czech rock band, also operating under the names M. Efekt, Modrý efekt, or the Special Blue Effect, since their formation in 1968. The band's main and only permanent member, from its founding until his death in 2016, was guitarist Radim Hladík, formerly of the Matadors. Blue Effect changed their musical style several times, ranging from blues rock, jazz fusion, to art rock.

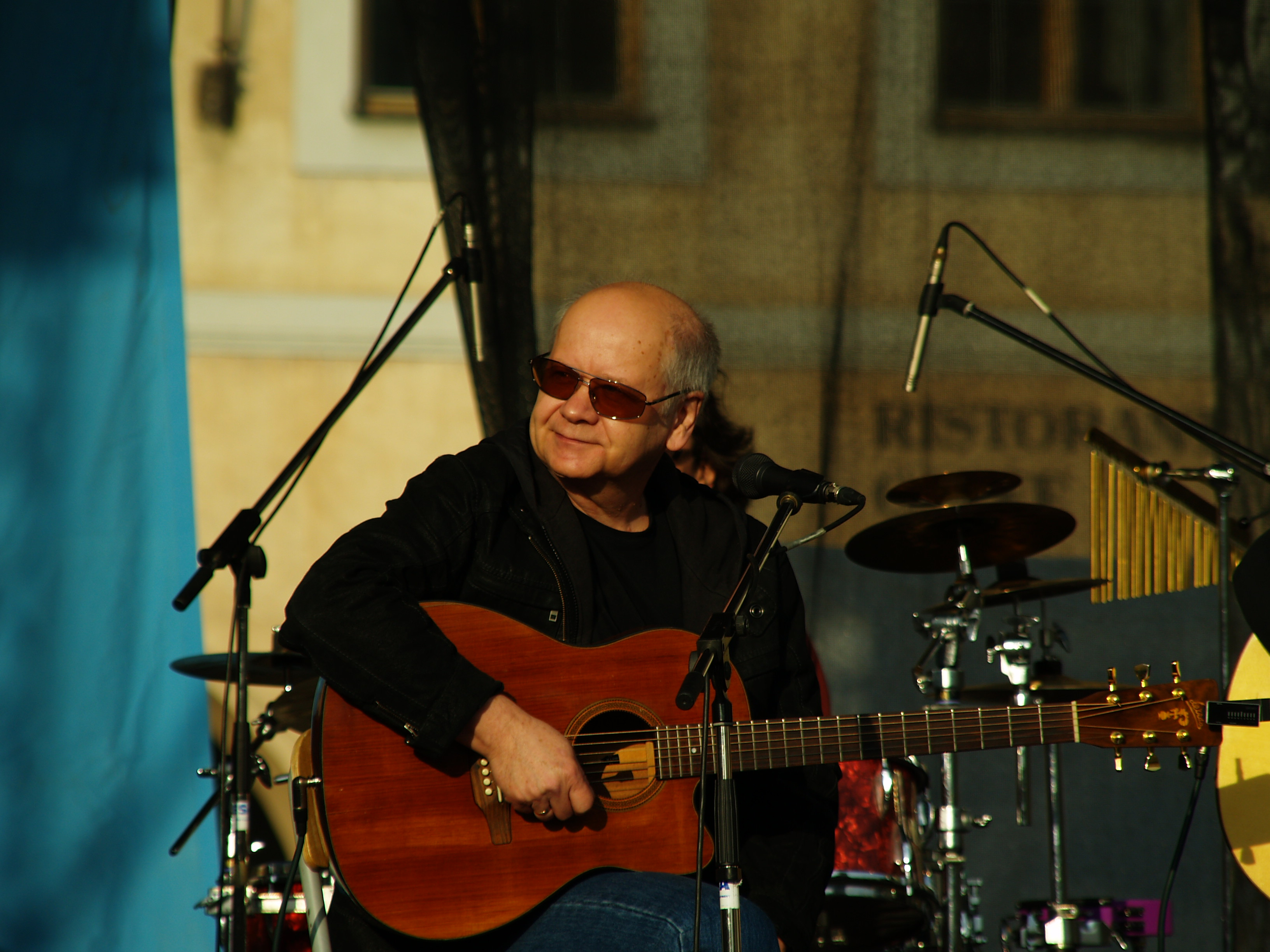
Radim Hladik performing in 2010

== History ==
=== Beginnings (1968–1970) ===
Blue Effect was founded at the end of 1968 by bassist Jiří Kozel, singer Vladimír Mišík (The Matadors, Etc...), and drummer Vlado Čech, who were joined by guitarists Radim Hladík and Miloš Svoboda. Mišík suggested the name The Special Blue Effect, a reference to the "Blue booklet" (Czech: Modrá knížka), a certificate of exemption from compulsory military service, which most members of the band had obtained. The name was soon shortened to The Blue Effect. At the 2nd Czechoslovak Beat Festival, which took place in December 1968 at Palác Lucerna, the band was named Discovery of the Year. Their first release, 1969's "Slunečný hrob / I've Got My Mojo Working", met with great success and sold more than 50,000 copies. The EP The Blue Effect, which came out the same year, did equally well. At this point, Svoboda left the band and Hladík remained the only guitarist for a long time.

With the advent of Normalization came the repression of rock music, and in 1970, Blue Effect released their first full-length album, Meditace. Many of the album's lyrics had to be rewritten as their original versions were censored. Part of the reason for this was the band's collaboration with musician and activist Jaroslav Hutka, who was on the government's watchlist for his activism. Zdeněk Rytíř took part in rewriting the lyrics for the record. The album was released internationally in 1971 under the name Kingdom of Life, with English lyrics sung by Lešek Semelka, who had joined on keyboards and later became the band's vocalist.

In the middle of 1970, Vladimír Mišík was forced to leave the group. Hladík became the new bandleader and remained so until his death in 2016. Around this time, Blue Effect began to lean more towards instrumental jazz rock, for a number of reasons: the growing popularity of this genre, greater tolerance on the part of censors toward "music of oppressed American minorities", such as jazz, as well as the rigorous demands placed on rock bands to ensure "clean" lyrics. The same year, Blue Effect, together with the band Jazz Q, recorded the album Coniunctio, a blend of jazz and rock largely inspired by Ornette Coleman's album Free Jazz.

=== New name, new albums (1971–1977) ===
In 1971, Blue Effect, like many other groups, had to switch to using a Czech name—Modrý efekt—which they shortened to M. Efekt. They maintained their jazz-rock focus and joined forces with the Jazz Orchestra of Czechoslovak Radio, with whom they recorded the albums Nová syntéza (1971) and Nová syntéza 2 (1974), and also performed at the International Jazz Festival in 1971. The album Modrý efekt & Radim Hladík followed in 1975. Bassist Jiří Kozel had emigrated to Switzerland in 1972 and was not present on the previous two records. He was replaced by Josef Kůstka.

At the beginning of 1975, Semelka and Kůstka left Blue Effect and formed the group Bohemia. After about six months of unstable lineups, Hladík hired Brno singer and keyboardist Oldřich Veselý and renowned Bratislava bassist Fedor Frešo, who had previously performed in the groups Prúdy, The Soulmen, and Collegium Musicum. In this composition, the ensemble began to lean towards art rock. Frešo's presence in the band made it possible to work in the Slovak milieu, which placed fewer limitations on rock musicians. Nevertheless, M. Efekt continued to have problems with their lyrics and sought inspiration in folk music. In 1977, they recorded the album Svitanie at Opus Records in Slovakia. Shortly after, Frešo left the band due to creative differences.

=== Final albums, final years (1979–1990) ===
After Frešo's departure, Semelka returned to the group. The band's next album, Svět hledačů, was released in 1979. The same year, Veselý left and M. Efekt continued as a trio, recording the album 33 in 1981, which was to be their last. Semelka and Čech left the group shortly after.

In the 1980s, the band performed in various lineups and released only a few singles. A number of musicians took turns playing with Hladík, the sole remaining original member. This included vocalists Oldřich Kellner and Luboš Pospíšil, keyboardist Luboš Manda, bassist Radek Křemeňák, and drummers Josef Havlíček and David Koller (Jasná Páka, Lucie). Blue Effect ceased to perform in 1990.

=== Reunions and revivals (1992, 1999, 2004–2016) ===
In 1992 and 1999, Blue Effect performed several one-off shows with past members Semelka, Veselý, and Mišík. In 2004, the band was revived by Radim Hladík, who surrounded himself with younger musicians, such as singer and guitarist Jan Křížek, and began to perform regularly. Hladík died on 4 December 2016, aged 69, of pulmonary fibrosis. Křížek subsequently announced the termination of the band's activities.

== Band members ==
- Radim Hladík – guitar
- Jiří Kozel – bass
- Vladimír Mišík – vocals
- Vlado Čech – drums
- Miloš Svoboda – guitar
- Lešek Semelka – keyboards, vocals
- Josef Kůstka – bass
- Oldřich Veselý – keyboards
- Fedor Frešo – bass
- Oldřich Kellner – vocals
- Luboš Pospíšil – vocals
- Luboš Manda – keyboards
- Radek Křemenák – bass
- Josef Havlíček – drums
- David Koller – drums
- Jan Křížek – vocals, guitar
- Václav Zima – drums
- Vojtěch Říha – bass

== Discography ==
Studio albums

- Meditace (1970)
- Coniunctio with Jazz Q (1970)
- Kingdom of Life (English version of Meditace – 1971)
- Nová syntéza (1971)
- Nová syntéza 2 (1974)
- Modrý efekt & Radim Hladík (1975)
- Svitanie (1977)
- Svět hledačů (1979)
- 33 (1981)

EPs

- The Blue Effect (1969)

Live albums

- Live (2008)

Compilations

- Beatová síň slávy (2004)
