= The 100 Greatest Slovak Albums of All Time =

The 100 Greatest Slovak Albums of All Time is a list of the best album releases issued by Slovak recording artists. As the first such list presented in Slovakia, it was published by Nový čas daily on 22 September 2007.

The list is entirely composed of Slovak, or else of formerly Czechoslovak artists, featuring all albums published in the country of origin from the 1960s onwards. Some of nominated full-length records could have been performed also in a different language (occasionally in English but partially). Ranking itself was based on votes received from twenty-five selected native-born musicians, critics and/or industry figures. Each of them voted ten most significant Slovak LPs from the past four decades in the country.

While the winning album became Zvoňte, zvonky (1969) by Prúdy band, the most-represented musical act on the list is female vocalist Marika Gombitová, having six out of her nine studio albums in total present. The final list also included two original motion picture soundtracks by various artists such as Neberte nám princeznú (1980) at number No. 27 and Fontána pre Zuzanu (1986) ranked at No. 90, as well as one live recording Live (1973) by Collegium Musicum at number No. 89.

== Members of the Jury ==
Members of the Jury
Composers and/or musicians:	Music publishers and/or record producers:	Broadcasters and/or radio-hosts:	Music reviewers and/or critics:
Pavol Hammel; Marián Varga; Peter Nagy; Ladislav Lučenič; Tomáš Dohňanský; Roman Galvánek; Branislav Mojsej; Juraj Černý	Peter Riava; Lenka Slaná; Pavol Repa; Tomáš Zubák	Milan Urbaník; Miroslav Babják; Roman Bomboš; Eva Bacigálová; Juraj Čurný; Július Kuruc	Peter Bálik; Bibiana Bombošová; Marián Pavel; Felícia Boronkayová; Peter Derňár; Jozef Kollár; Denisa Vološčuková

== Statistics ==
=== Artists with the most albums ===
- 11 Marika Gombitová – with 6 solo albums including 1 double release, 2 with Modus, 1 soundtrack, and 2 with Miro Žbirka (as featured artist)
- 9 Pavol Hammel – with 1 solo, 3 with Prúdy, 2 with Marián Varga, 2 double sets with Collegium Musicum, and 1 with Marika Gombitová (as writer)
- 7 Janko Lehotský – with 3 by Modus, 3 with Marika Gombitová (as writer/featured artist), and 1 with Collegium Musicum (as featured artist)
- 6 Marián Varga – with 1 solo, 3 (including two double sets) with Collegium Musicum, 1 with Pavol Hammel, and 1 with Prúdy
- 6 Richard Müller – with 4 solo, and 2 with Banket
- 6 Miro Žbirka – with 3 solo, 2 with Modus, and 1 soundtrack (as featured artist)
- 6 Jaro Filip – with 2 solo, 1 with Milan Lasica & Július Satinský, and 3 with Richard Müller (as writer)
- 5 Dežo Ursiny – with 2 solo, 2 with Ivan Štrpka, and 1 compilation (as writer)

=== Number of albums from each decade ===
- 1960s – only 1 album (1.0%)
- 1970s – 13 albums (13.0%)
- 1980s – 35 albums (35.0%)
- 1990s – 27 albums (27.0%)
- 2000s – 24 albums (24.0%)

== Top 10 ==
=== Top 10 – Overall ===
#	Album	Artist	Release	Label
1	Zvoňte, zvonky	Prúdy	1969	Supraphon
2	Konvergencie	Collegium Musicum	1971	OPUS
3	Bioelektrovízia	Banket	1986	OPUS
4	Skúsime to cez vesmír	Tublatanka	1987	OPUS
5	Valec	IMT Smile	1998	Universal
6	Hodina slovenčiny	Elán	1984	OPUS
7	Bolo nás jedenásť	Milan Lasica, Julo Satinský & Jaro Filip	1981	OPUS
8	Deň medzi nedeľou a pondelkom	Peha	2005	B&M
9	Zelená pošta	Pavol Hammel & Marián Varga	1972	OPUS
10	Ôsmy svetadiel	Elán	1981	OPUS

=== Top 10 – Females ===
#	Album	Artist	Release	Label
1	V cudzom meste	Jana Kirschner	1999	Mercury
2	Dievča do dažďa	Marika Gombitová	1979	OPUS
3	Mince na dne fontán	Marika Gombitová	1983	OPUS
4	Pelikán	Jana Kirschner	2002	Universal
5	Ateliér duše	Marika Gombitová	1987	OPUS
6	Veci, čo sa dejú	Jana Kirschner	2003	Universal
7	Slnečný kalendár	Marika Gombitová	1982	OPUS
8	Shine	Jana Kirschner	2007	Universal
9	Voľné miesto v srdci	Marika Gombitová	1986	OPUS
10	Colors in My Life	Misha	2002	Sony/Bonton

=== Top 10 – Males ===
#	Album	Artist	Release	Label
1	Zelená pošta	Pavol Hammel & Marián Varga	1972	OPUS
2	Modrý vrch	Dežo Ursiny	1981	OPUS
3	Pevnina detstva	Dežo Ursiny	1978	OPUS
4	Doktor Sen	Miro Žbirka	1980	OPUS
5	Robo Grigorov – Midi	Robo Grigorov	1987	OPUS
6	Nočná optika	Richard Müller	1998	PolyGram
7	Nohy	Robo Grigorov	1987	OPUS
8	Sezónne lásky	Miro Žbirka	1982	OPUS
9	Chráň svoje bláznovstvá	Peter Nagy	1984	OPUS
10	33	Richard Müller	1994	BMG-Ariola

== See also ==
- Slovak popular music
- Slovakia in the Eurovision Song Contest
- ZAI Awards
- U.S. 500 Greatest Albums of All Time list by Rolling Stone
