= The Soulmen =

Slovak rock band

- L–R: Dežo Ursiny, Fedor Frešo, Vlado Mallý

Background information
- Origin: Bratislava, Czechoslovakia (now Slovakia)
- Genres: Blues rock; psychedelic rock; big beat
- Years active: 1967–1968
- Labels: Panton
- Spinoffs: The New Soulmen
- Past members: Dežo Ursiny; Fedor Frešo; Vlado Mallý; Dušan Hájek

The Soulmen were a Slovak rock band who sang in English, active between 1967 and 1968. Together with the Beatmen, they were one of the most prominent big beat groups in Slovakia; both bands were led by vocalist and guitarist Dežo Ursiny, who later had a solo career. A power trio, the Soulmen included bassist Fedor Frešo and drummer Vlado Mallý, both of whom were founding members of the group Prúdy. Frešo later also co-founded Collegium Musicum and played with Fermáta.

== History ==
"Sample of Happiness"
Sample of "Sample of Happiness"

"Baby Do Not Cry"
Sample of "Baby Do Not Cry"

In 1966, the rock group the Beatmen emigrated from Czechoslovakia to West Germany and subsequently split up. Their former frontman, Dežo Ursiny, who hadn't gone with them, started a new group called the Soulmen, together with bassist Fedor Frešo and drummer Dušan Hájek, who was soon replaced by Vlado Mallý. In December 1967, they performed at the first Czechoslovak Beat Festival, held at Lucerna, in Prague, winning first place in a contest of performers. In 1968, they toured around Czechoslovakia and Hungary and recorded an EP that contained the tracks "Sample of Happiness", "Wake Up", "I Wish I Were", and "Baby Do Not Cry", which they released in March.

In November 1968, Ursiny formed the New Soulmen, with Ján Lehotský on keyboards, Fedor Letňan on bass, and Peter Mráz on drums. They recorded two songs in November but broke up in early 1969, without releasing any material.

== Band members ==
- Dežo Ursiny – guitar, vocals (d. 1995)
- Fedor Frešo – bass, vocals (d. 2018)
- Vlado Mallý – drums, vocals
- Dušan Hájek – drums, vocals
