= Fermáta =

Slovak jazz-rock band

- Origin: Bratislava, Czechoslovakia (now Slovakia)
- Genres: Progressive rock, jazz-rock
- Years active: 1972–present
- Labels: Opus, Pavian, Belle Antique, Jupiter, Open Music, Bertelsmann Music Group
- Members: František Griglák; Tamás Belicza; Maxo Mikloš; Tomáš Berka
- Past members: Tomáš Berko; Anton Jaro; Pavol Kozma; Laco Lučenič; Fedor Frešo (deceased); Peter Szapu; Cyril Zeleňák; Karol Oláh; Ladislav Lučenič; Juraj Bartovič; Roman Chovanec; Dalibor Jenis; Martin Hanzel; Márius Bartoň; Jindřich Plánka; Peter Preložník; Martin Valihora; Jakub Hittrich; Igor Skovay
- Website: www.fermata.rocks

Fermáta are a Slovak progressive rock band formed by guitarist František Griglák and keyboardist Tomáš Berko in Bratislava in 1972. They are best known for their purely instrumental jazz-rock compositions and progressive rock roots, having sprung up from the ashes of the original big-beat craze in the Eastern Bloc and bearing similarities to other Czechoslovak jazz-rock groups of the time, including Blue Effect and Collegium Musicum, Griglák being a former member of the latter.

Notable musicians that have been members of Fermáta include Fedor Frešo, also formerly of Collegium Musicum, Karol Oláh, Juraj Bartovič, and others. Their 1978 studio album Huascaran, named after the eponymous Peruvian mountain, remains their most popular release among contemporary listeners.

== Discography ==
- 1975 - Fermáta
- 1977 - Pieseň z hôľ (Song From Ridges)
- 1978 - Huascaran
- 1980 - Dunajská legenda
- 1981 - Generation
- 1981 - Biela planéta (The White Planet)
- 1984 - Ad Libitum
- 1991 - Simile...
- 1994 - Real Time
- 1999 - X
- 2005 - Next
- 2019 - Blumental Blues
