= Jaroslav Filip =

Slovak musician, actor, and comedian (1949–2000)

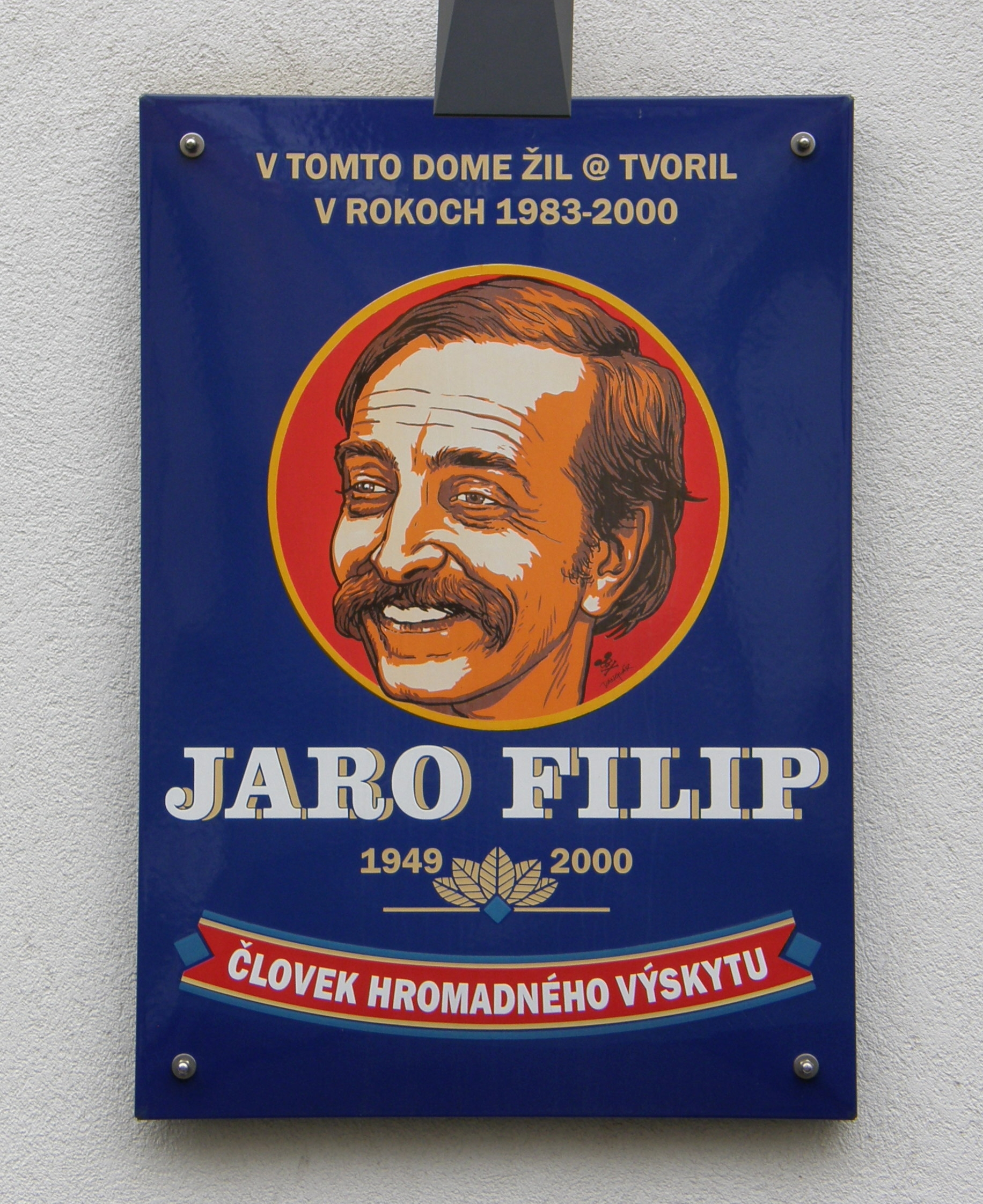
- Commemorative plaque of Jaroslav Filip in Bratislava
- Born: 22 June 1949; Hontianske Moravce, Czechoslovakia
- Died: 11 July 2000 (aged 51); Bratislava, Slovakia
- Resting place: Krematórium a urnový háj v Bratislave
- Other name: Jaro Filip
- Occupations: Musician; composer; actor; comedian
- Years active: 1968–2000
- Known for: Music, early promotion of internet in Slovakia
- Children: 4, including Dorota Nvotová
- Musical career
- Instrument: Piano
- Formerly of: Peter Lipa's Blues Five; Dežo Ursiny & Provisorium; Lasica, Satinský, Filip
- Website: jarofilip.sk

Jaroslav Filip (22 June 1949, Hontianske Moravce – 11 July 2000, Bratislava), known as Jaro Filip, was a Slovak musician, composer, humorist, dramaturge, actor, columnist, and early promoter of the internet in Slovakia. His work includes numerous pop hits in cooperation with the singer Richard Müller, including "Cigaretka na dva ťahy", "Milovanie v daždi", and "Daňový únik".

From the 1970s, Filip collaborated with comedians and musicians Milan Lasica and Július Satinský, recording a number of albums, including Bolo nás jedenásť, S vetrom o preteky, and My. In the 1990s, he was a member of a group of Slovak humorists (with Stano Radič, Rasťo Piško, and others) who appeared in several formats both on TV and radio, commenting on political and social life in the country.

Filip died on 11 July 2000 due to a massive heart attack.

== Life and career ==
Jaroslav Filip was born in the Slovak village of Hontianske Moravce to a family of teachers; he had three younger siblings. He played the piano from the age of seven and developed a love of radio early on.

In the 1960s, he studied at the Bratislava Conservatory and became an admirer of rock musician Dežo Ursiny and his Beatmen. He later went on to study in Žilina, and after graduating in 1968, he took a job with Slovenská televízia as a camera assistant, back in Bratislava. Around this time, he began getting involved in the music scene, playing with Peter Lipa's band Blues Five.

In the early 1970s, Filip studied dramaturgy and screenwriting at VŠMU, graduating in 1976, after which his career took off. He began playing with Ursiny, a collaboration that spanned close to 24 years and saw the recording of a dozen albums. He also got married, performed at Divadlo u Rolanda theatre, composed stage plays and film music, worked in radio, began hosting TV shows, and teamed up with longtime collaborators Milan Lasica and Július Satinský.

Following the Velvet Revolution in 1989, Filip became a prominent humorist, both through his radio and television shows, in collaboration with such personalities as Stano Radič, Rasťo Piško, Miroslav Noga, Štefan Skrúcaný, and Zuzana Tlučková. His content often included political satire, particularly targeting former prime minister Vladimír Mečiar. He was an eager promoter of new technologies, especially mobile phones and the internet, at a time when their penetration in Slovakia was still low. He actively participated in email forums, both national and foreign, and authored the first email drama. In 1997, together with Róbert Dyda, he founded the first Slovak internet magazine, titled Sieťovka. He was also an avid computer gamer and published computer game articles and reviews in Riki magazine since 1994.

In the 1990s, Filip worked with singer Richard Müller, helping him record five solo albums. Despite having a long musical career, Filip didn't release any original material until his 1996 debut, Cez okno, whose lyrics were written by Müller. The same year, he published Meditation for Piano and two years later, Ten čo hrával s Dežom, a tribute album to Ursiny recorded with Andrej Šeban on guitar, Oskar Rózsa on bass, and Marcel Buntaj on drums. Müller, again, wrote the lyrics.

== Personal life ==
Filip had three children with his wife, Eva. He also had a daughter, actress and musician Dorota Nvotová, with actress Anna Šišková. He died on 11 July 2000 due to a massive heart attack.

In 2002, author Marian Jaslovský published a biography of Filip, titled Človek hromadného výskytu. In 2008, a segment on the documentary series Radosť zo života showcased Filip.

== Awards and tributes ==
- 2000 Crystal Wing Award, in memoriam
- Prize of the Minister of Culture of the Slovak Republic, in memoriam
- Order of Ľudovít Štúr, 1st Class, in memoriam
- Müller spieva Lasicu, Lasica spieva Müllera, Müller a Lasica spievajú Filipa, 2008 tribute album by Richard Müller and Milan Lasica

== Selected recordings ==
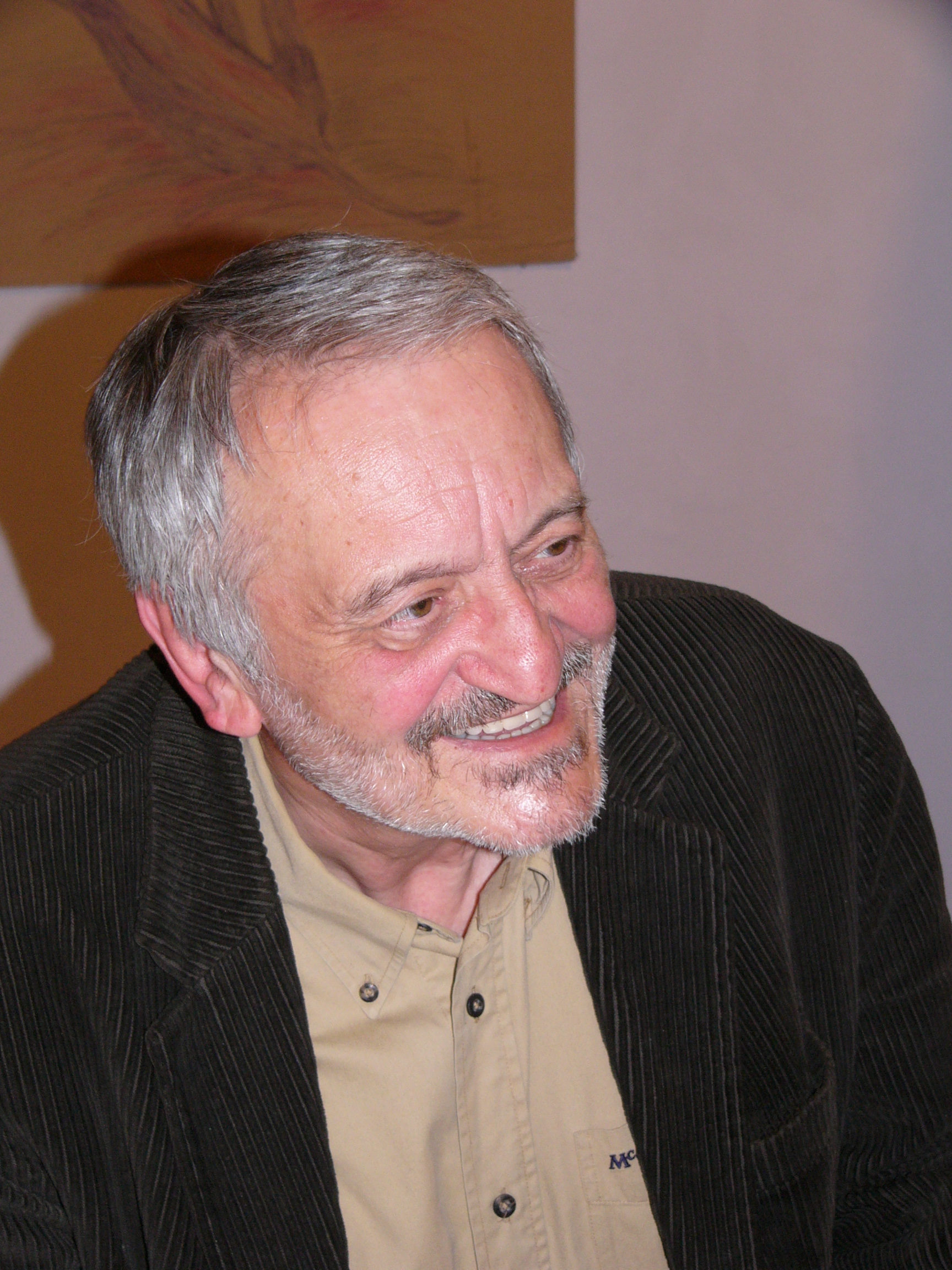
Milan Lasica, one part of the Lasica-Satinský-Filip trio (died on 18 July 2021)

=== Albums ===
==== Solo ====
- Cez okno (1996)
- Meditation for Piano (1996)
- Ten čo hrával s Dežom (1998)
- Človek Hromadného Výskytu (posthumous compilation, 2002)
- Najkrajšie Piesne Jara Filipa (posthumous compilation, 2007)

==== with Dežo Ursíny ====
- Dežo Ursíny & Provisorium (1973)
- Pevnina detstva (1978)

==== with Dežo Ursíny & Ivan Štrpka ====
- Nové mapy ticha (1979)
- Zelená (1986)
- Na ceste domov (1987)
- Momentky (1990)
- Do tla (1991)
- Ten istý tanec (1992)
- Príbeh (1994)

==== with Dežo Ursíny, Ivan Štrpka, Burčiak ====
- Modrý vrch (1981)

==== Milan Lasica and Július Satinský ====
- Pred popravou (1979)

==== Lasica, Satinský, Filip ====
- Bolo nás jedenásť (1981)
- S vetrom o preteky (1982)
- Deň Radosti (1990)

==== Lasica, Filip ====
- My (1987)
- Sťahovaví vtáci (1990)

==== with Richard Müller ====
- 33 (1994)
- LSD (1996)
- Nočná optika (1998)
- Koniec sveta (1999)
- ...a hosté (2000)

=== Film music ===
- Citová výchova jednej Dáše (1980)
- Čarbanice (1982)
- Času je málo a voda stúpa (documentary, 1997)
- Rivers of Babylon (1998)

== See also ==
- List of Slovak composers
- The 100 Greatest Slovak Albums of All Time
