= Collegium Musicum (band) =

Slovak progressive rock band

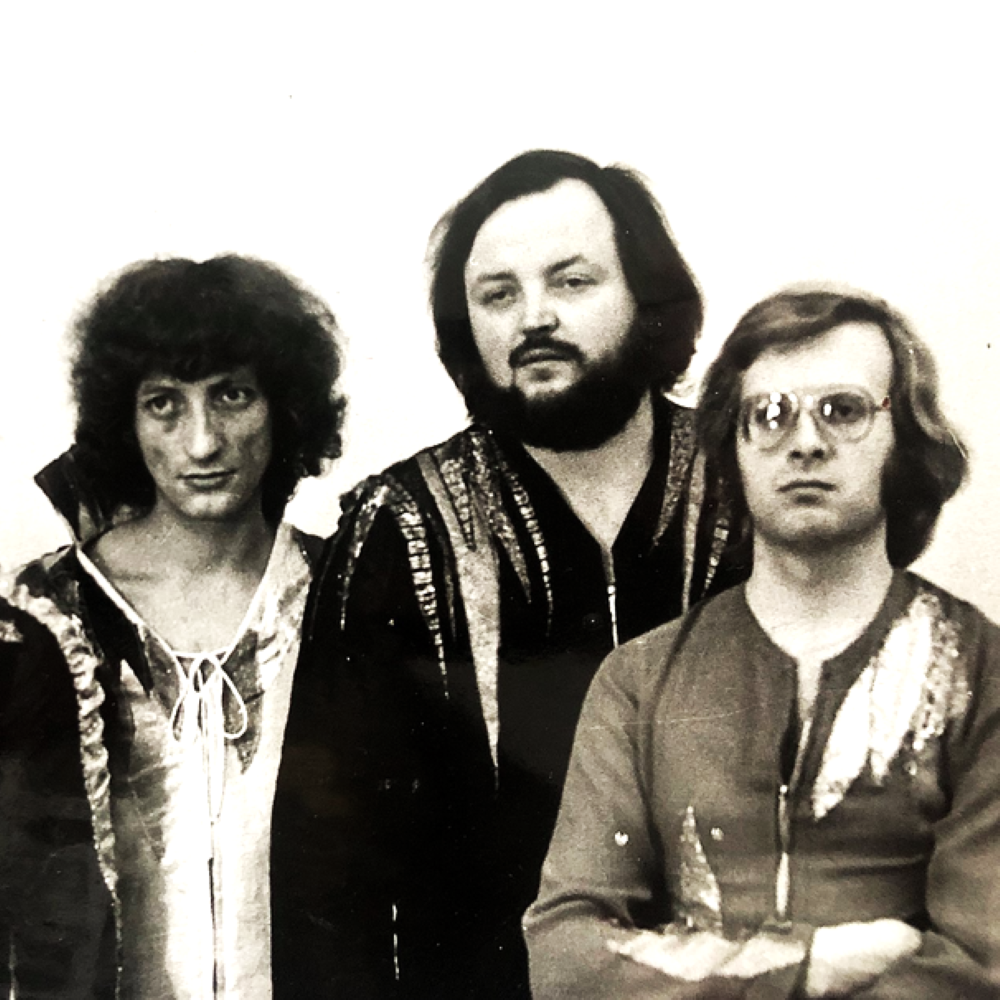
- Collegium Musicum as a trio in 1974. L–R: Marián Varga, Fedor Frešo, and Dušan Hájek.

Background information
- Origin: Bratislava, Czechoslovakia (now Slovakia)
- Genres: Progressive rock; symphonic rock; experimental rock; instrumental rock
- Works: Discography
- Years active: 1969–1981, 1997, 2009–2017
- Labels: Opus; Supraphon; Bonton
- Past members: Marián Varga; Fedor Frešo; Dušan Hájek; František Griglák; Pavol Hammel; Martin Valihora; see more...

Collegium Musicum was a Slovak progressive rock and symphonic rock band formed by keyboard virtuoso Marián Varga and bassist Fedor Frešo in Bratislava in late 1969. They are best known for their complex, predominantly instrumental compositions centered around Varga's Hammond organ, lengthy solos, and rock-tinged interpolations of classical works by Rimsky-Korsakov, Dvořák, Stravinsky, Bartók, and others in the Western classical canon.

While never achieving mainstream popularity and gaining little exposure outside the Iron Curtain, Collegium Musicum was among the most foundational pillars of the Czechoslovak big-beat scene in the 1970s, drawing frequent comparisons to English progressive rock counterparts Emerson, Lake & Palmer, with Varga himself being labelled the "Slovak Keith Emerson". The group throughout its life featured some of the foremost Slovak rock instrumentalists, who apart from Varga and Frešo included František Griglák, Pavol Hammel, Martin Valihora, and others. They gained notoriety among the Slovak youth counterculture for their unique and improvisational live performances, and the band would spend significantly more time touring the country than in the recording studio. Nonetheless, eight LPs (Note: This number includes Zelená Pošta (1972), which was initially released as a Varga/Hammel collaboration but contemporaneously rebranded as a Collegium Musicum record.) were released over the span of ten years, and Varga disbanded the group soon after recording their final studio record, Divergencie (1981).

Collegium Musicum enjoyed a revival through touring in the late 1990s and from 2009 onward, particularly among younger generations. The latter featured the so-called "classic" lineup of Varga, Frešo and Griglák, but with newcomer Valihora on drums, as Hájek had retired years prior. The group disbanded after the death of Varga in August 2017.

== History ==
=== From 1969 to 1974 ===
The first lineup of Collegium Musicum consisted of three former members of the then-dismantled rock band Prúdy — Marián Varga (keyboards), Fedor Frešo (bass/vocals) and Dušan Hájek (drums) — alongside guitarist Fedor Letňan. This lineup did not last long and no recordings of this era are known of. In early 1970, Letňan was replaced by Pavel Váně, guitarist of the Czech band The Progress Organisation, and the 1970 EP Hommage à J.S. Bach features Váně and the band playing two Varga compositions, the namesake homage to Baroque composer Johann Sebastian Bach, and "Ulica plná plášťov do dažďa" ("A Street Full of Raincoats"), the latter of which Frešo and Hájek would receive co-writing credits for. Váně was replaced by Rastislav "Rasťo" Vacho the same year as the band prepared to record their self-titled debut album. Collegium Musicum (1970) is divided into three compositions, with the final track "Concerto in D" being a reinterpretation of Joseph Haydn's "Rondo all'Ungarese" from his Keyboard Concerto No. 11, arranged by Varga. The musical style featured on the album would foreshadow the more progressive approach taken by the band on future records.

The group toured small clubs in and around Bratislava for the next half a year with this lineup of Vacho on guitar, until he quit after wishing to continue his architectural studies at university. He would return in 1972 for the album Zelená Pošta (1972), but in the meantime, Varga and the rest of Collegium Musicum sought out another guitarist to replace Vacho via mutual acquaintances in the Slovak music scene. Guitarist and songwriter also formerly of Prúdy Pavol Hammel was asked, but he declined, instead pointing to a protégé who appeared on a recent album of his, František "Fero" Griglák. Varga was skeptical, knowing Griglák was only seventeen years old at the time and had only the Hammel album to his name in terms of recorded material. Despite this, an audition to join the group was presented to Griglák, and he passed, allowing Collegium Musicum the opportunity to tour once again with a new lineup and to begin ironing out the compositions that would appear on their subsequent studio album, Konvergencie (1971).

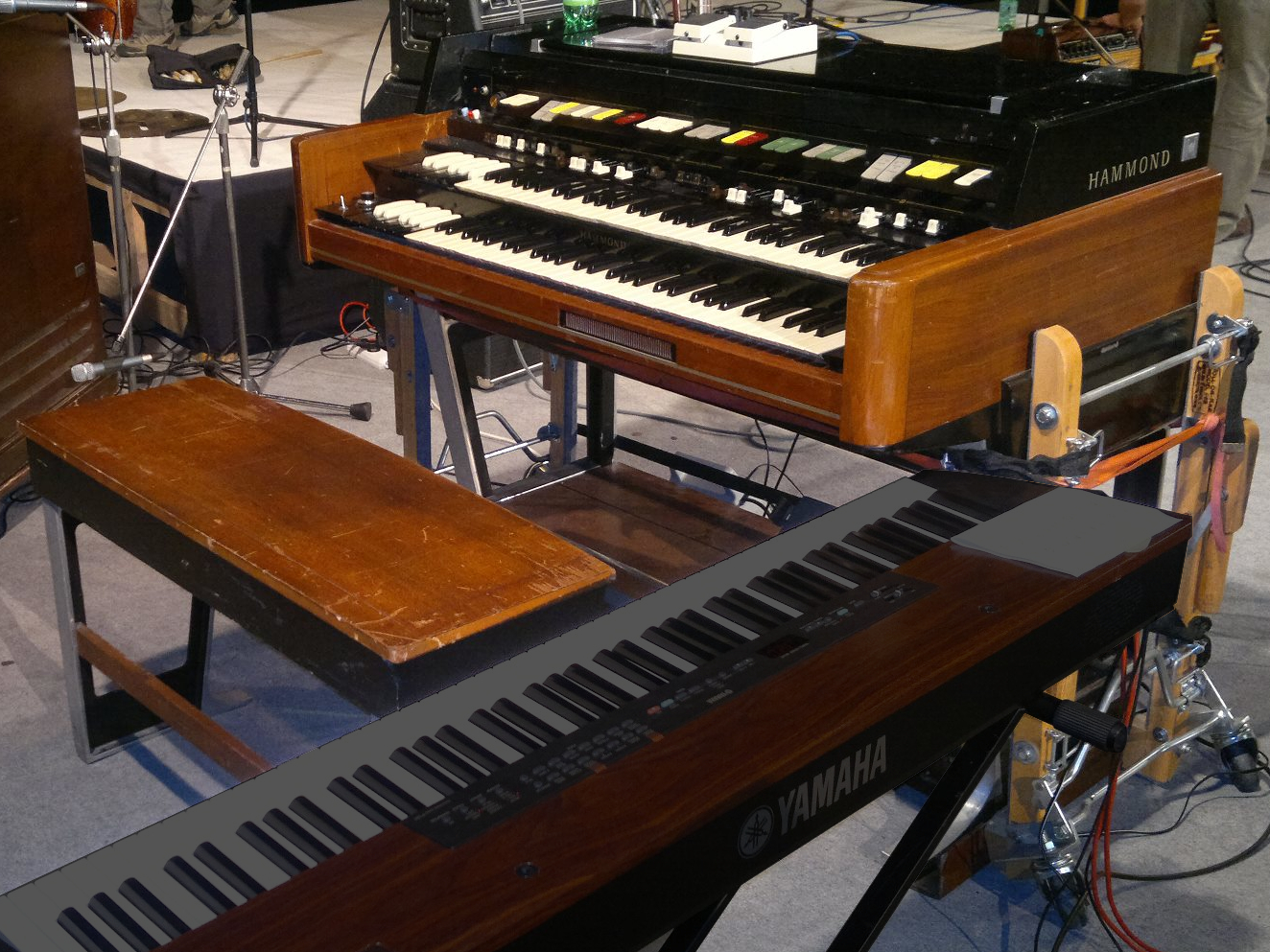
Marián Varga's organ of choice when performing live was the Hammond X-77 model (top), his pictured here alongside one of his Yamaha electric keyboards (bottom), in 2012.

Konvergencie was an immense project for the group to undertake. It is a double LP, the first in Slovak rock history, with each side containing a single song, nearly all over twenty minutes in length. The only time something of this magnitude had been done prior was with fellow English progressive rock group Soft Machine and their seminal album Third (1970), released only a year prior. The songs on Konvergencie range from a live recording of the epic multi-movement "Suita po tisíc a jednej noci" ("Suite After One Thousand and One Nights"), a reinterpretation of composer Nikolai Rimsky-Korsakov's 1888 piece Scheherazade, to "Eufónia" ("Euphony"), a rock jam in D mixolydian that abruptly morphs into a series of extended solo improvisations on Varga's Hammond, a grand piano, and church organ – complete with polytonality, drones, tape manipulations, and abrasive tone clusters. As it was intended to be released during the late winter of 1971, there contains on Konvergencie multiple themes relating to Christmas, New Year's Day, and snowy weather. This album was Collegium Musicum's greatest musical achievement financially, selling over 140,000 copies in Czechoslovakia and earning Varga a large amount in royalties. It would later be declared the second greatest Slovak album of all time by a jury of twenty-five members, including Varga, in 2007.

Griglák continued to tour with Collegium Musicum into the year 1972, but grew dissatisfied when he wished to have his own compositions performed, being sidelined by Varga. He left and formed the jazz-rock band Fermáta with keyboardist Tomáš Berko that same year. Rasťo Vacho would return but leave again soon after, at which point Varga, Frešo and Hájek made the decision to stay together as a trio and perform live without a guitarist. This was unique for a rock group at the time, yet drew even more similarity to Keith Emerson and his bands The Nice and Emerson, Lake & Palmer. The only album corresponding with this lineup was 1973's Live, recorded during a 21 July performance in the Slovak Radio Building (then called the Czechoslovak Radio Concert Hall). It featured more emphasis on Frešo's virtuosic bass lines, Hájek's heavy rhythmic interplay on drums (including a drum/percussion solo over seven minutes long on the track "Monumento"), and a more loud, raucous and distorted organ tone from Varga. This was also the last record to feature Frešo until Continuo (1978), with him having left in 1974.

=== From 1975 to 1981 ===
Frešo would be replaced by bassist Ivan Belák for the following studio record, Marián Varga & Collegium Musicum (1975). This LP saw the return of a guitarist to the group, this time a session musician by the name of Jozef Farkaš. It also contained compositions that would become live favorites for the group, most notably a rendition of Béla Bartók's modernist piano cycle Mikrokosmos, featuring a main groove in 7/8 time. As with "Mikrokosmos", the record makes frequent use of irregular time signatures, like with the Varga composition "Hudba k vodometu č. 1" ("Fountain Music No. 1"), where both the main and final motives are in 15/16 and 13/8 time, respectively.

Collegium Musicum went on hiatus for over a year and reconvened in December 1977, with Varga, Frešo, Hájek, and newly recruited singer Ľudovít Nosko and lead guitarist Karl Witz for their next album of recorded material, Continuo (1978). In 1979, a new, last line-up with drummer Pavel Cosma and guitarist Peter Peteraj was formed again. They released the album On a Ona (1979), this time with Varga as the only original member remaining in the group. Finally, after Divergencie (1981) was recorded, Varga split up the group to pursue a solo career in film scoring and other endeavors.

=== From 1997 to 2017 ===
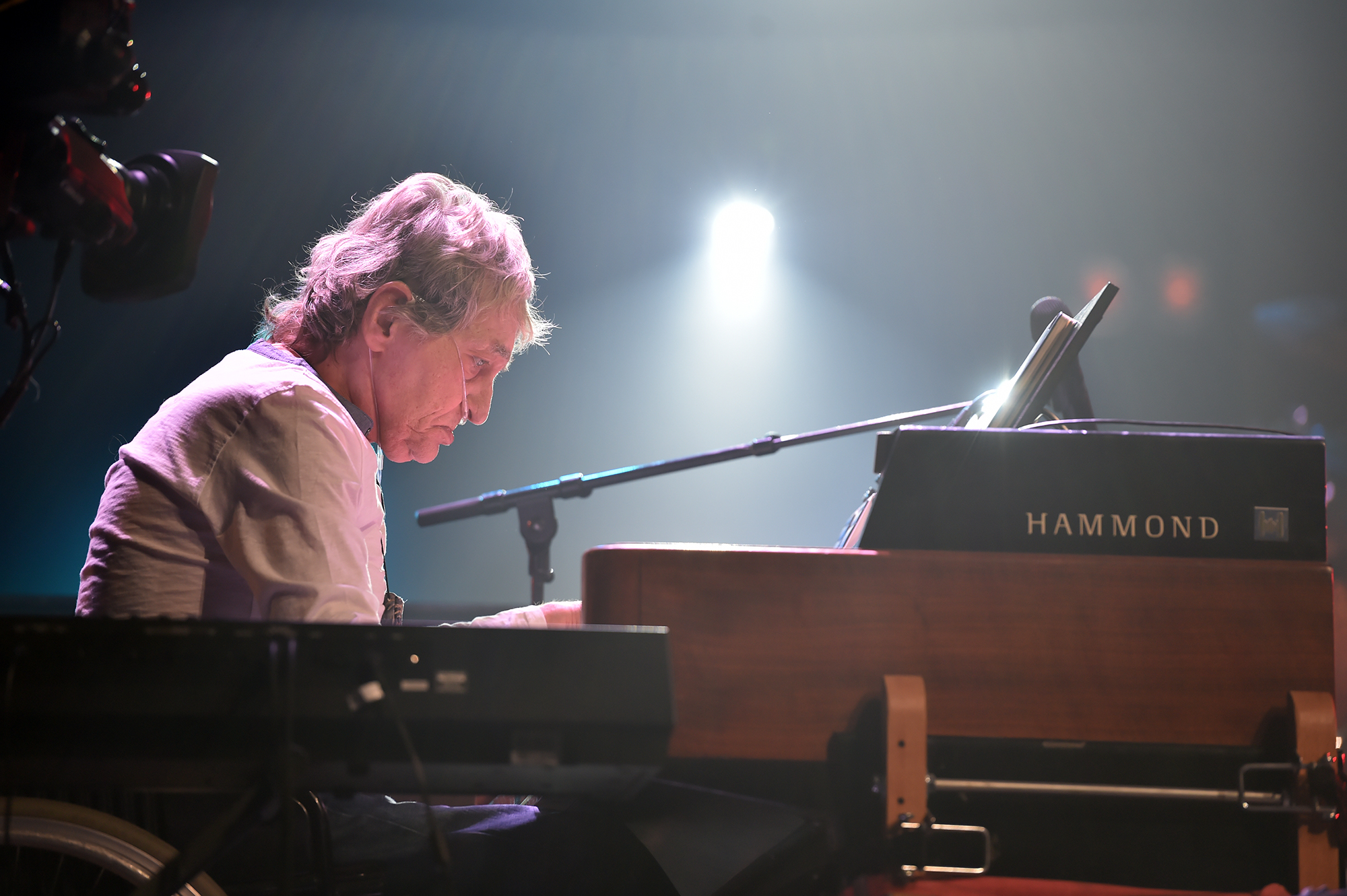
Bandleader Marián Varga performing with Collegium Musicum in the mid-2010s.

In 1997, Collegium Musicum reunited as a trio (with Varga, Frešo, and Hájek) for a single concert in Bratislava on the 8th of June, with the performance being taped for the album Collegium Musicum '97. This was their first record initially released on compact disc. Jazz fusion artist Andrej Šeban is featured on three tracks as a guest guitarist.

In March 2009, Slovak media reported the band had gotten back together to perform a nationwide tour, with stops in Trenčín, Košice, and Bratislava among other cities. Frešo said, "We wanted to get back on the podium, and we agreed to do so. One minute we figured it might not be bad, we'll be performing our tried and tested material." This time, Fero Griglák, who still had commitments to his band Fermáta, agreed to perform guitar on the tour. As Hájek had retired from the music industry in 2006, he was replaced by Martin Valihora, a young Slovak drummer who had previously studied percussion at the Berklee College of Music. The live album Speak, Memory (2010) corresponds to a performance at Bratislava's Arena Theatre on the 28th of November 2009.

== Musical style ==
The precise genre(s) of Collegium Musicum have been variously described as progressive rock, symphonic prog, art rock, jazz rock, avant-prog, instrumental rock, psychedelic rock, experimental rock, and others. In regard to the improvisational nature of their live shows, Varga stated, "I do not start creating as late as on the stage... I always have my dramaturgy programme which is quite precisely construed. I allow myself to improvise only within the composition's structure."

== Discography ==
=== Studio albums ===
- 1970 – Collegium Musicum
- 1971 – Konvergencie
- 1972 – Zelená Pošta (uncredited; with Pavol Hammel)
- 1975 – Marián Varga & Collegium Musicum
- 1978 – Continuo
- 1979 – On a Ona
- 1981 – Divergencie

=== Live albums ===
- 1973 – Live
- 1997 – Collegium Musicum '97
- 2010 – Speak, Memory

=== EPs ===
- 1970 – Hommage à J.S. Bach / Ulica plná plášťov do dažďa

== Band members ==
Name	Years active	Instruments	Release contributions
Marián Varga	1969–1981; 1997; 2009–2017 (died 2017)	organ; piano	all releases
Fedor Frešo	1969–1974; 1977–1979; 1997; 2009–2017 (died 2018)	bass guitar; vocals	Hommage à J.S. Bach (1970); Collegium Musicum (1970); Konvergencie (1971); Zelená Pošta (1972); Live (1973); Continuo (1978); Divergencie (1981); Collegium Musicum '97 (1997); Speak, Memory (2010)
Dušan Hájek	1969–1975; 1977–1979; 1997	drums; percussion	Hommage à J.S. Bach (1970); Collegium Musicum (1970); Konvergencie (1971); Zelená Pošta (1972); Live (1973); Marián Varga & Collegium Musicum (1975); Continuo (1978); Collegium Musicum '97 (1997)
František Griglák	1971–1972; 2009–2017	guitar	Konvergencie (1971); Speak, Memory (2010)
Pavel Váně	1970	guitar	Hommage à J.S. Bach (1970)
Rastislav "Rasťo" Vacho	1971; 1972–1973 (died 2018)	guitar	Collegium Musicum (1970); Zelená Pošta (1972)
Ivan Belák	1974–1975	bass guitar	Marián Varga & Collegium Musicum (1975)
Jozef Farkaš	1974–1975	guitar	Marián Varga & Collegium Musicum (1975)
Ľudovít Nosko	1977–1979	guitar; vocals	Continuo (1978)
Karel Witz	1977–1979	guitar	Continuo (1978)
Peter Peteraj	1979–1981	guitar	Divergencie (1981)
Anastasis Engonidis	1981	bass guitar	Divergencie (1981)
Martin Valihora	2008–2017	drums	Speak, Memory (2010)
