= Konvergencie =

Studio album by Collegium Musicum
- Released: 1971
- Recorded: Bratislava, Slovakia
- Genre: Art rock, Progressive rock, jazz fusion, symphonic rock, electroacoustic music
- Length: 82:32
- Label: OPUS
- Producer: Viliam Vaškovič, Marián Varga, Fedor Frešo

Collegium Musicum chronology
Collegium Musicum (1970)	Konvergencie (1971)	Collegium Musicum Live (1973)

Konvergencie (English: Convergences) is the second album by Collegium Musicum, released on OPUS in 1971. It was the first Slovak rock double album to be released.

It was recorded in Czech-Slovak Radio studio in Bratislava in September and October 1971, and was released for the Christmas market in the same year.

At the same time, it is the first album released by the newly founded Opus publishing house, which was created by separating from Supraphon. The album was a great success, around 140,000 copies were sold, Marián Varga received 250,000 CZK in royalties for it.

== Track listing - Original LP ==
=== LP 1 ===
Side A
No.	Title	Writer(s)	Length
1.	"PF 1972 (Happy New Year 1972)"	M.Varga/K.Peteraj	22:00

Side B
No.	Title	Writer(s)	Length
1.	"Suita po tisíc a jednej noci (Suite After One Thousand and One Nights)"	N. Rimsky-Korsakov/M.Varga, F.Frešo, D.Hájek, F.Griglák	22:33

=== LP 2 ===
Side C
No.	Title	Writer(s)	Length
1.	"Piesne z kolovrátku (Songs from Barrel-Organ)"	M.Varga/F.Frešo/D.Hájek/F.Griglák/P.Hammel	17:53

Side D
No.	Title	Writer(s)	Length
1.	"Eufónia (Euphony)"	M.Varga	20:06

== Credits and personnel ==
- Marián Varga - hammond organ, piano, subharchord, Glockenspiel
- Fedor Frešo - bass guitar, bass mandoline, vocal
- František Griglák - electric guitar, mandoline, vocal
- Dušan Hájek - drums
- Pavol Hammel - lead vocal
- Children's Choir under the direction of I. Klocháň
