= Run to the Sun (disambiguation) =

"Run to the Sun" is a song by Erasure.

Run to the Sun may also refer to:

- "Run to the Sun", a song by Lobby
- "Run to the Sun", a song by Massimo Brancaccio performing as Max Coveri
- "Run to the Sun", a song by N*E*R*D from In Search of...
- "Run to the Sun", a song by Scream from No More Censorship
- Run to the Sun, an annual Volkswagen-owners event in Newquay, Cornwall, England

== See also ==
- Run for the Sun, a 1956 film starring Trevor Howard and Richard Widmark
