= Radim Hladík =

Czech musician (1946–2016)

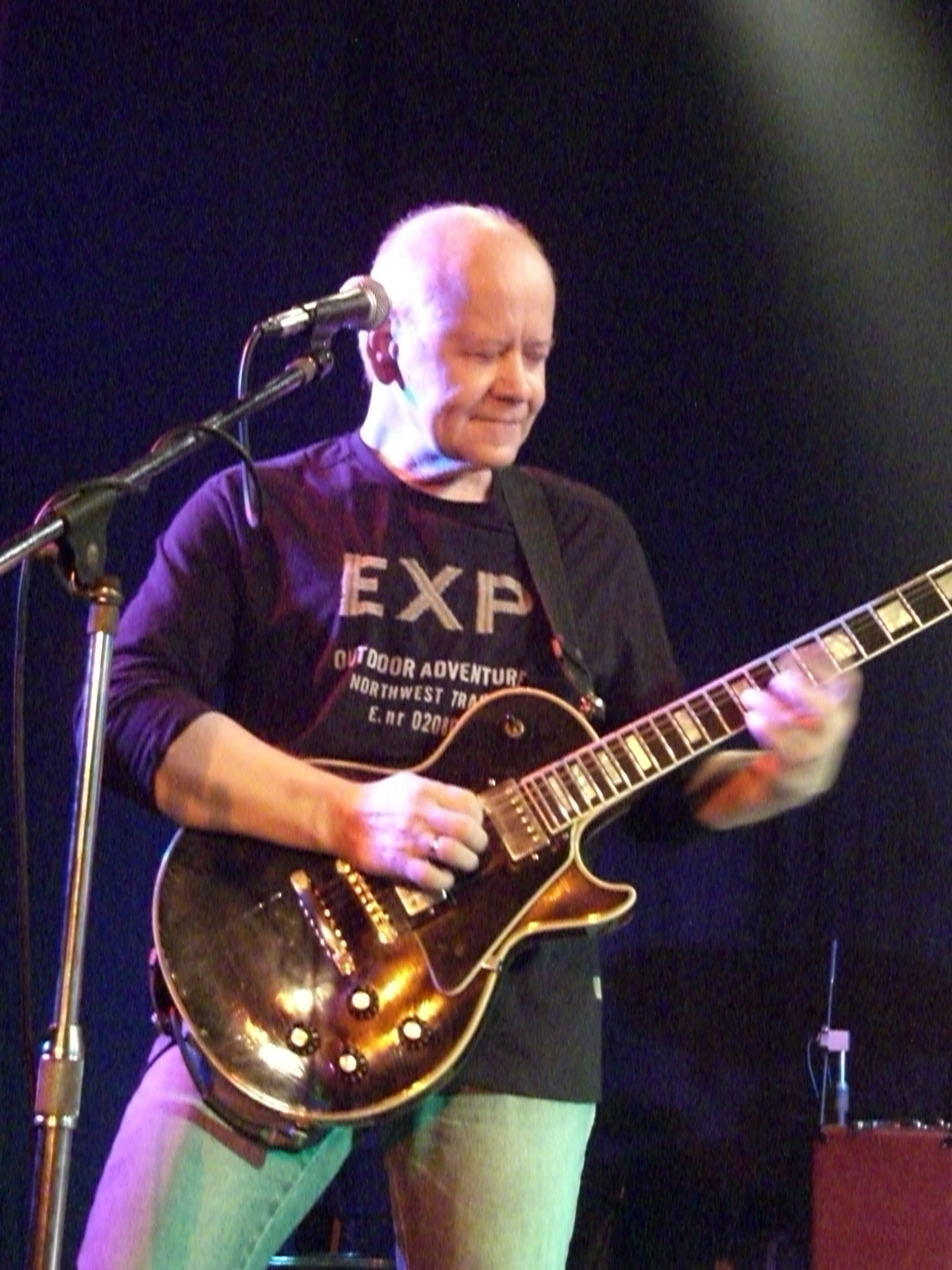
- Hladík performing with Blue Effect in 2007

Background information
- Born: 13 December 1946; Prague, Czechoslovakia
- Died: 4 December 2016 (aged 69)
- Genres: Rock, jazz fusion
- Instrument: Guitar
- Years active: 1964–2016
- Formerly of: Blue Effect

Radim Hladík (13 December 1946 – 4 December 2016) was a Czech guitarist, composer and producer. He was known primarily for his trademark rock and jazz-fusion electric sound, although his early style was more blues-oriented, and Hladík also played acoustic folk. Since the second half of the 1960s, he has been considered one of the best and most influential Czech guitarists, and has won awards in the "beat rock" category.

== Biography ==
Learning the piano as a child, Hladík later studied classical guitar at the Prague Conservatory for two years. At the age of 15 he began playing guitar in the rock group Komety, before joining The Matadors with his friend Vladimír Mišík. In 1968 Hladík and Mišík established the Blue Effect (later called Modrý Efekt and M. Efekt), which initially played more mainstream, blues-influenced "Beat" music, quickly gaining recognition as a dominant force on the rhythm-and-blues scene in Czechoslovakia. After Mišík left the band, Hladík became the band's leader, and steered it away from the spotlight into jazz fusion (yielding two jazz-orchestra accompanied albums Nova syntéza and Nova syntéza 2), and eventually into progressive rock territory through the 1970s. During that period, he also collaborated with some of the key protagonists of the Slovak music scene, Marián Varga and Pavol Hammel, contributing to their Na druhom programe sna and Zelená pošta albums, and worked with bass guitarist Fedor Frešo (album Svitanie, 1977). His jazz-rock playing was also featured on instrumental collaborations with the Jazz Q members, Martin Kratochvíl and Jiří Stivín.

Hladík's electric style is uniquely recognizable, and relies primarily on fast ascending and descending scales alternating with his signature bending, particularly at the ends of phrases, and frequent use of hammer-on and pull-off techniques. In the late 1960s, he was strongly influenced by the British Invasion and Jimi Hendrix, and became one of the pioneers of the electric blues-rock sound in Czechoslovakia, particularly the use of various effects. From the early 1970s his playing incorporated jazz phrasings, although Hladík's sound remained mostly rock-oriented, especially in his later years. The majority of Hladík's recordings and live performances feature his favourite Gibson Les Paul Custom 1959.

Hladík is probably best known for his instrumental composition "Tearoom" (Czech: Čajovna), originally intended as a "filler" on the 1975 album, Modrý efekt & Radim Hladík, but re-recorded in several variants (albums Czech Masters Of Rock Guitar, Na Kloboučku with Michal Pavlíček). In 1979, with singer Lešek Semelka and drummer Vlado Čech, Hladík recorded the winning song of the annual music contest Bratislavská lýra, "Šaty z šátků". He remained active in the studio and continued performing until shortly before his death in 2016 following a prolonged lung illness.
