= The Beatmen =

Slovak rock band

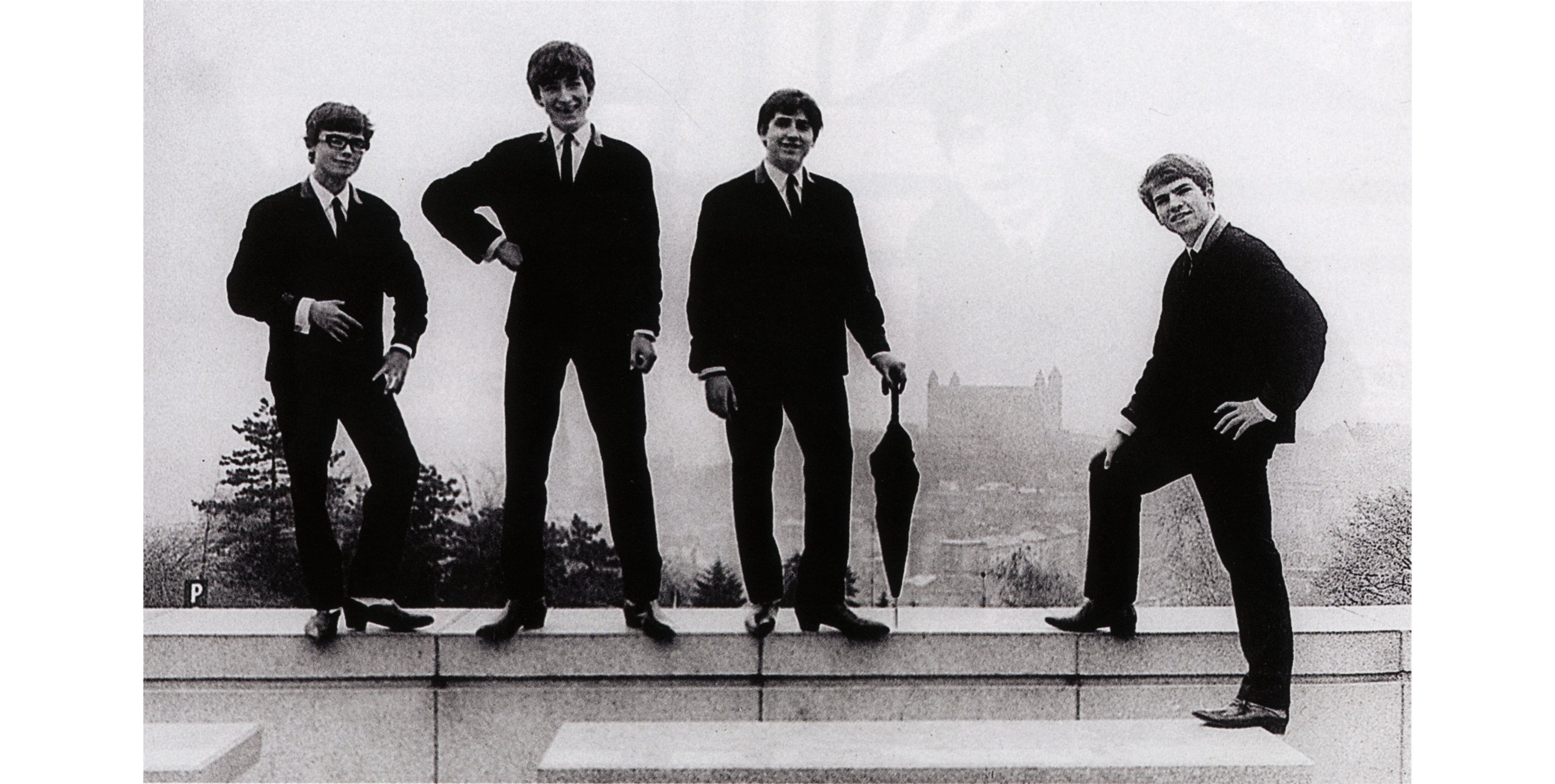
- The Beatmen

Background information
- Origin: Bratislava, Czechoslovakia (now Slovakia)
- Genres: Rock; big beat
- Years active: 1964–1966
- Labels: Supraphon
- Past members: Dežo Ursiny; Marián Bednár; Miroslav Bedrik; Peter Petro; Stano Herko

The Beatmen were a Slovak rock band active between 1964 and 1966, who primarily sang in English and were heavily influenced by the Beatles. They played a style of music called big beat in Eastern Europe, and throughout their career, they only released six songs. The Beatmen were led by singer and guitarist Dežo Ursiny, who later played with a similar group, called the Soulmen.

== History ==
The Beatmen were formed in 1964 by Peter Petro (drums), Miroslav Bedrik (guitar), and Marián Bednár (bass). They took on lead guitarist Stano Herko, who left after only a brief stint with the band. His replacement was Dežo Ursiny. In 1965, they released two singles, containing two songs each, which proved popular in Czechoslovakia.

In 1966, they were the first Eastern European band to play outside the Eastern Bloc, when they performed in Munich, West Germany. The same year, they opened for the English rock band Manfred Mann in Bratislava. The band members subsequently emigrated to West Germany, though Ursiny remained in Czechoslovakia and formed the Soulmen the following year.

Apart from their official singles, the Beatmen recorded at least five other songs. These remained unreleased until 1997 and 2000, when they were included on Dežo Ursiny's compilation albums Pevniny a vrchy and Pevniny a vrchy 2. They are "Walkin' Home", "Hey Mr. Jones", "Schôdzka" (Slovak name, English lyrics), "Mám ju rád" (cover of the Beatles' "She Loves You" with Slovak lyrics), and "Keby som bol Nór" (Slovak lyrics).

== Band members ==
- Dežo Ursiny – lead guitar, harmonica, vocals (1964–1966)
- Miroslav Bedrik – rhythm guitar, vocals (1964–1966)
- Marián Bednár – bass, vocals (1964–1966)
- Peter Petro – drums, vocals (1964–1966)
- Stano Herko – lead guitar (1964)
- Juraj Eperješi – guitar (1966)

== Discography ==
Albums

- Are Goin' On (live, 2017)

Singles

- "Safely Arrived" / "The Enchanted Lie" (1965)
- "Break It" / "Let's Make a Summer" (1965)
- "Stand Up and Go" / "As You Love Me" (1966)

== Song samples ==
Let's Make a Summer

Safely Arrived

Break It

The Enchanted Lie
