= On a Ona =

Studio album by Collegium Musicum
- Released: 1979
- Recorded: January/March 1979, Pezinok, Slovakia
- Genre: Symphonic rock; progressive rock
- Length: 43:57
- Label: OPUS (#9113 0727)
- Producer: Ján Lauko

Collegium Musicum chronology
Continuo (1977)	On a Ona (1979)	Divergencie (1981)

On a Ona (English: He and Herself) is the sixth studio album by Collegium Musicum, released on OPUS in 1979.

== Track listing ==
All tracks are written by Varga, Hammel and Filan, except for the track 4 (Varga) and the bonus track (Varga and Peteraj).

No.	Title	Featured artist(s)	Length
1.	"Rozhodnutia"	Ľudovít Nosko	3:50
2.	"Nobelova cena za lásku"	Pavol Hammel and Marika Gombitová	3:14
3.	"Osvetľovač"	Hammel	5:37
4.	"Amata nobis, Quantum amabitur nulla"		9:52
5.	"Amori"	Gombitová and Nosko	2:55
6.	"Končeky prstov"	Nosko	3:54
7.	"Smutnomodrá"	Hammel	4:27
8.	"Mášmarád"	Gombitová	6:18
9.	"Rozhodnutia II"	Gombitová and Nosko	3:50
Total length:			43:57

Bonus track (CD release)
No.	Title	Featured artist	Length
10.	"Piesočný dom (Live '73)"	Marie Rottrová	3:24
Total length:			47:21

== Official releases ==
- 1979: On a Ona, LP, MC, OPUS, #9113 0727
- 1997: On a Ona, re-release, CD, bonus track, #91 2614
- 2007: On a Ona, re-release, CD #91 2776

== Credits and personnel ==
- Marián Varga - music, piano, Wersi organ, synthesizer (Arp, Rolland, Polymoog)
- Pavol Hammel - music, lead vocal, acoustic guitar
- Marika Gombitová - lead vocal
- Ľudovít Nosko - lead vocal
- Fedor Frešo - guitar
- Pavol Kozma - drums, percussions
- Peter Peteraj - solo guitar
- František Griglák - solo guitar (guest)
- Boris Filan - lyrics
- Ján Lauko - producer
- Juraj Filo - sound director
- Ivan Minárik - technician
- Milan Vašica - responsible editor
- Tibor Borský - photography
- Ivan Popovič - design
- Marie Rottrová - lead vocal (bonus track)
- Kamil Peteraj - lyrics (bonus track)
- Marie Rottrová - lead vocal (bonus track)
