= Prúdy =

Slovak art rock band

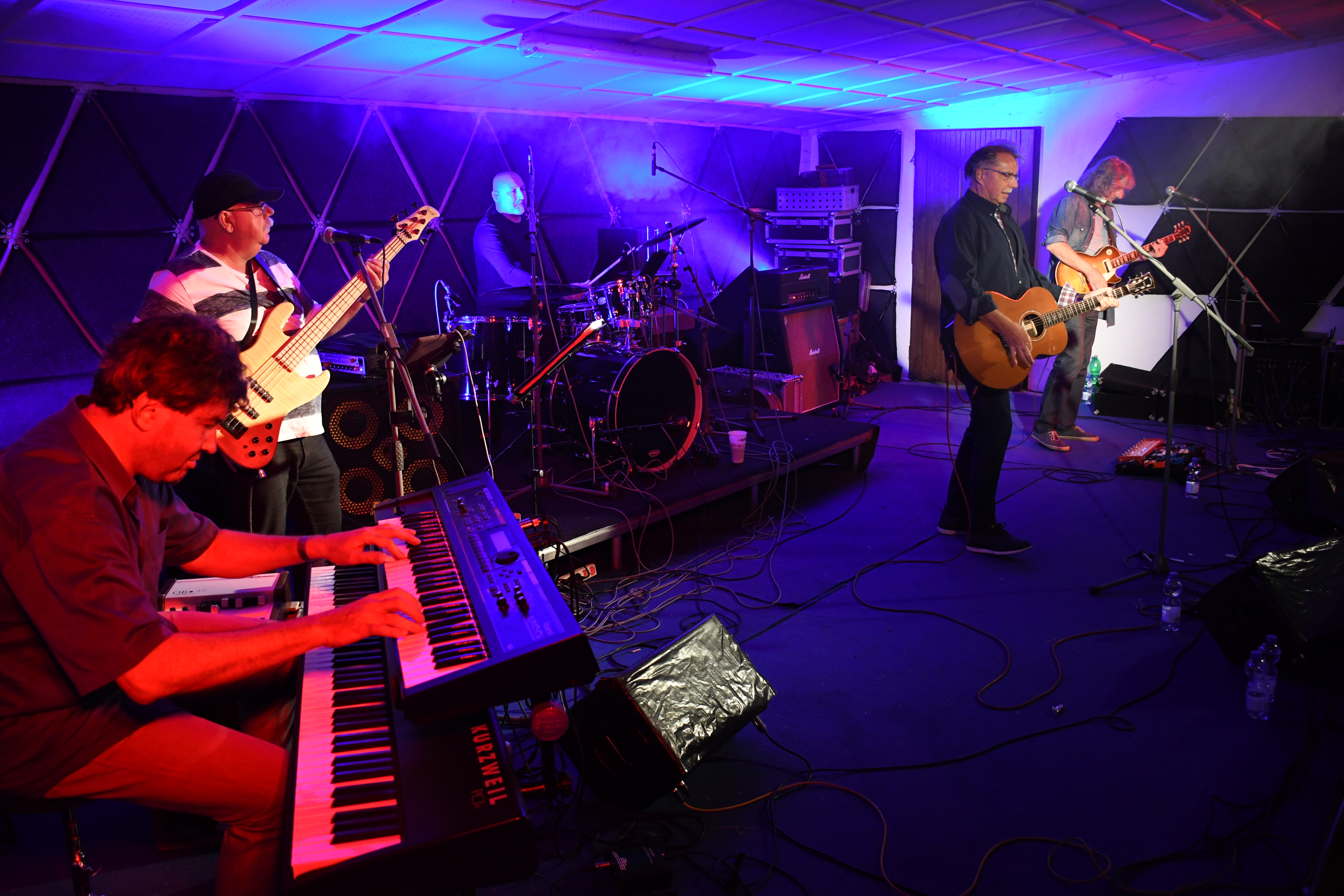
- Prúdy as seen live at a reunion concert in 2018

Background information
- Origin: Bratislava, Czechoslovakia
- Genres: Big-beat; rock & roll; art rock
- Works: Discography
- Years active: 1963-1969; 1970-1974
- Labels: Supraphon; Opus
- Past members: Pavol Hammel; Marián Varga; Fedor Frešo; Dušan Hájek; František Griglák; see more...

Prúdy (English: "The Jets") was a Slovak rock band formed by guitarist Pavol Hammel in the former Czechoslovakia in 1963. The original lineup of the band consisted of Hammel on rhythm guitar and vocals, Peter Saller on lead guitar, František Machats on drums, and Vladimír Kaššay on bass guitar. Various members came and went throughout the bands lifetime, including future big players in the Slovak big-beat scene like Marián Varga and Fedor Frešo, among others. Prúdy were a predominantly live band, and only released one studio album in their first incarnation, the now famous Zvoňte, zvonky (1969). After the group dismantled in 1969, it was reintegrated as a vehicle for Pavol Hammel's solo career the following year, recording under the name Pavol Hammel & Prúdy.

== Members ==
- Pavol Hammel (rhythm guitar, vocals; 1963-1969, 1970-1973)
- Peter Saller (lead guitar; 1963-1969)
- Vladimír Kaššay (bass guitar; 1963-1968)
- František Machats (drums; 1963-1967)
- Marián Varga (keyboards; 1967-1969)
- Peter Petro (drums; 1967-1968)
- Ľubor Dolinský (drums; 1968)
- Vlado Mallý (drums; 1968-1969)
- Fedor Frešo (bass guitar; 1968-1969)
- Dušan Hájek (drums; 1969)
- Peter Barica (bass guitar; 1970)
- Milan Čačaný (drums; 1970)
- František Griglák (guitar; 1970-1971)
- Alexander Filo (bass guitar; 1970-1971)
- Anton Kuruc (drums; 1970-1971)
- Ľubomír Plai (drums; 1971-1973)
- Jozef Farkaš (guitar; 1972-1974)
- Ivan Belák (bass guitar; 1972-1974)
- Peter Baran (cello; 1972-1974)
- Ján Lauko (keyboards; 1972-1974)
- Pavol Barna (drums; 1973-1974)
- Pavol Kozma (drums; 1974)

== Discography ==
=== as Prúdy ===
- Zvoňte, zvonky (1969)

=== as Pavol Hammel & Prúdy ===
- Pavol Hammel a Prúdy (1970)
- Som šťastný keď ste šťastní (1972)
- Šlehačková princezna (1973)

== See also ==
- The 100 Greatest Slovak Albums of All Time
