= Milan Lasica =

Slovak actor, comedian, and singer (1940–2021)

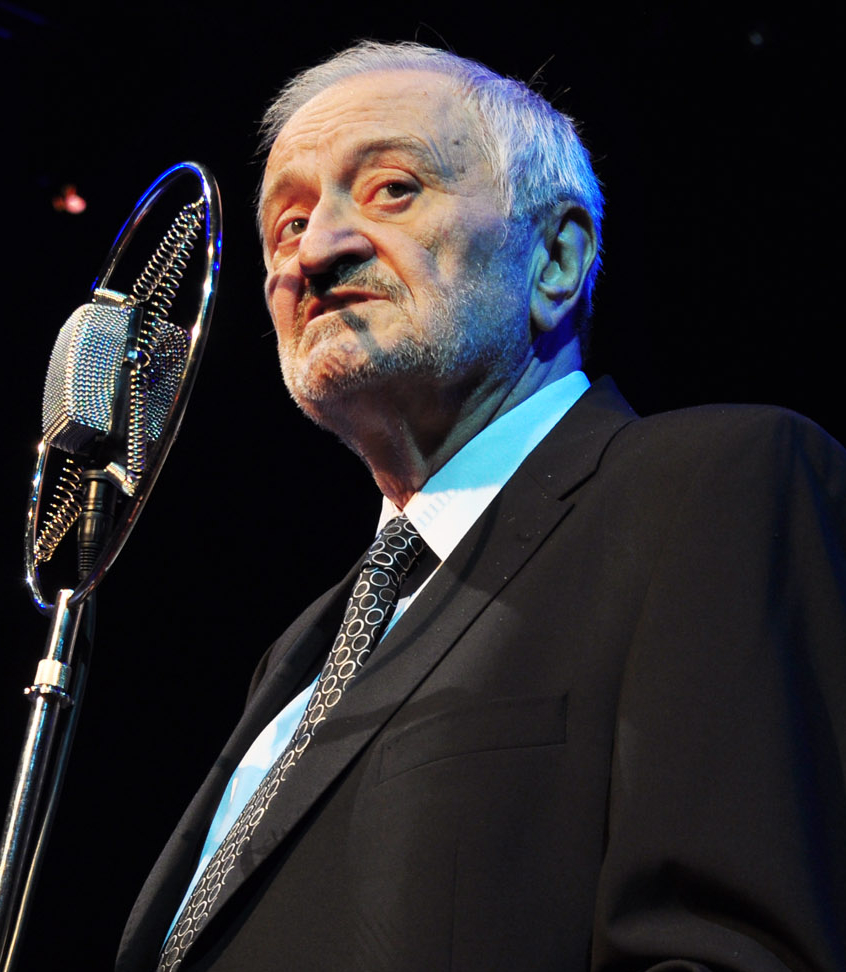
- Milan Lasica v roce 2012
- Born: 3 February 1940; Zvolen
- Died: 18 July 2021; Bratislava
- Occupations: Writer, playwright, actor, lyricist, stage actor, singer, television presenter
- Spouse(s): Magdaléna Vášáryová, Zora Kolínska
- Awards: Czech Medal of Merit, 1st class (President of the Czech Republic, 2003); Cross of Pribina class II (Ivan Gašparovič, President of Slovakia, 2005); Crystal Wing Awards (1997, 1998); Martin Porubjak Award (2021); Annual award ACFK (Association of Czech Film Clubs, 2019)

Milan Lasica (Slovak pronunciation: [ˈmilan ˈlasit͡sa]; 3 February 1940 – 18 July 2021) was a popular Slovak comedian, actor, singer, writer, lyricist and satirist.

Active from 1961 to his death, he was known from his double act with Július Satinský and their collaboration with musician Jaroslav Filip and other Slovak and Czech comedians and actors.

Lasica was born in Zvolen, Slovakia. He collaped and died aged 81 during his performance in Bratislava, just after he had given his last bow after a song from his last show called "I am an Optimist".

== Family ==
- Zora Kolínska – first wife (1962–1970)
- Magdaléna Vášáryová – second wife (from 1980 to his death)
