= Lobby (band) =

Slovak Eurodance band

- Origin: Slovakia
- Genres: Eurodance; pop rock
- Years active: 1995–2001
- Labels: ENA Records; Dance Pool; Ariola; Sony Music Bonton
- Past members: Martina Ostatníková; Andrej Dziak; Milan Michalík; Karol Bližnák; Miroslav Babják

Lobby was a Slovak Eurodance band active between 1995 and 2001. They released four studio albums and sang in Slovak, English, and Spanish. The band was made up of Martina Ostatníková, Andrej Dziak, Milan Michalík, Karol Bližnák and, until 1997, Miroslav Babják.

== Biography ==
Lobby's first album, Hi Dee Ho!, was released in 1995 on the independent label ENA Records. This was followed in 1996 by Power in Our Hands and Livin' Large (1997) on Sony's dance subsidiary Dance Pool. Their last album, Y2K, came out in 2000 on Ariola Records. The band broke up the following year.

== Band members ==
- Martina Ostatníková – vocals
- Andrej Dziak – keyboards, rap, backing vocals
- Milan Michalík – keyboards, rap, backing vocals
- Karol Bližnák – keyboards, rap, backing vocals
- Miroslav Babják – keyboards, rap, backing vocals

== Discography ==
- Hi Dee Ho! (1995)
- Power in Our Hands (1996)
- Livin' Large (1997)
- Y2K (2000)

== See also ==
- List of Eurodance artists
