= Lucerna Palace =

Entertainment and shopping complex in Prague, Czech Republic

- Palác Lucerna
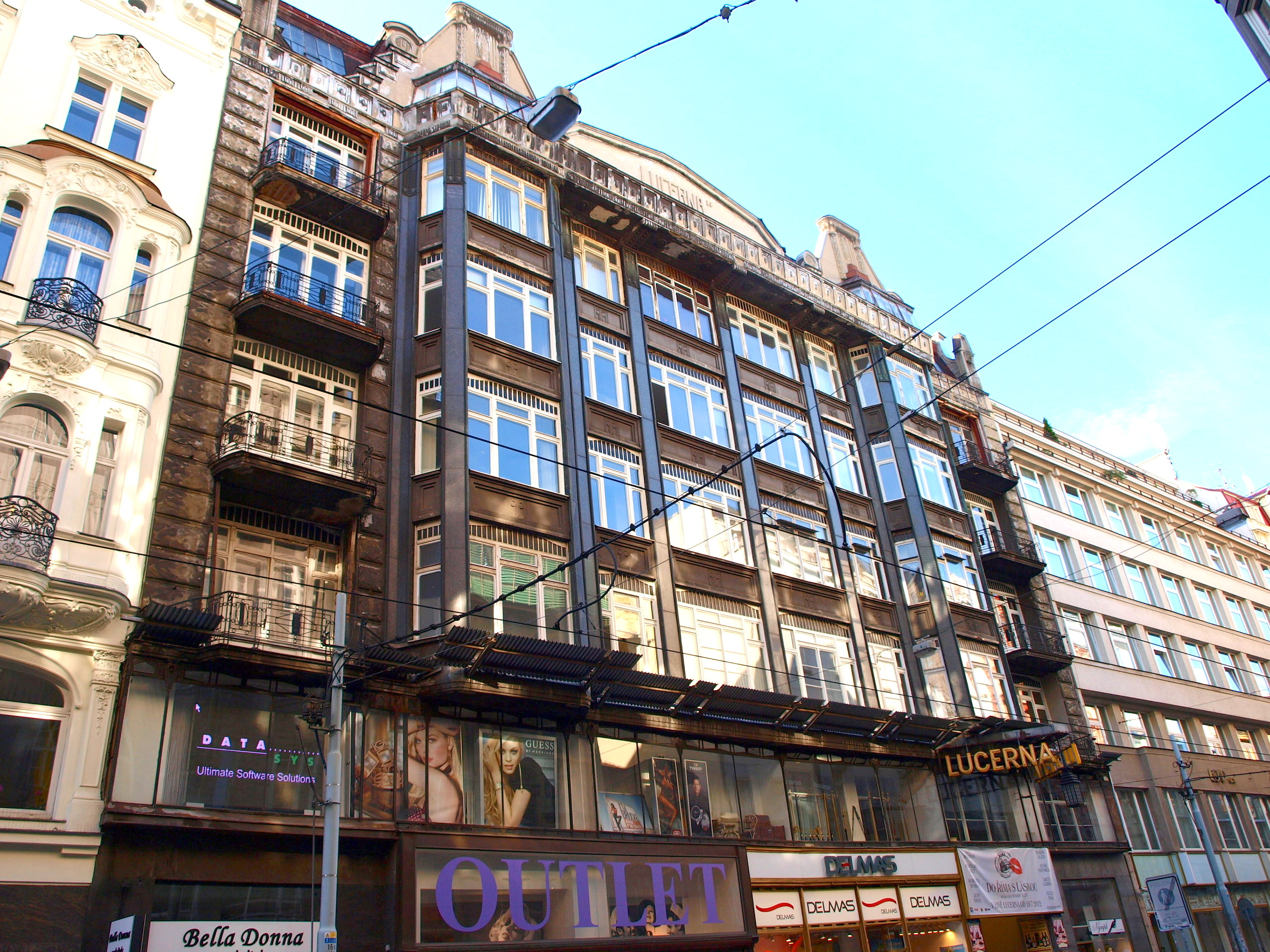
- Vodičkova street facade of the Lucerna Palace complex
- Interactive map of Lucerna Palace
- Address: Štěpánská 704/61 and Vodičkova 704/36, Nové Město; Prague; Czech Republic
- Coordinates: 50°4′52.07″N 14°25′32.95″E
- Owner: Dagmar Havlová
- Type: Entertainment

Construction
- Built: 1907–1921
- Years active: 1921–present
- Architect: Stanislav Bechyně
- Builder: Vácslav Havel

Website
- lucerna.cz

Lucerna Palace (Czech: Palác Lucerna) is an entertainment and shopping complex in the New Town quarter of Prague, Czech Republic. In 2017, it was named a national cultural monument.

== Design and construction ==
The building, nestled between Štěpánská and Vodičkova streets, was constructed between 1907 and 1921, based on a design by Stanislav Bechyně. The work was carried out by Vácslav Havel (grandfather of former President of the Czech Republic Václav Havel). Originally intended to serve as a hockey stadium, it was reworked into a large social hall as the dimensions were soon found to be unsuited for its initial planned purpose. At the time, it was unique due to being one of the first reinforced concrete buildings in Prague. The edifice bears significant features of the waning Art Nouveau style and the emerging Modernism. In addition to its Great Hall, the complex also houses the Marble Hall, the Lucerna Music Bar, a movie theatre, a café, and a prominent pedestrian walkway, or "passage", connecting Štěpánská to Vodičkova street. Lucerna is one of twenty-six buildings in Prague with a functional paternoster lift.

== Uses ==
From its inauguration until the present day, Lucerna has been an important cultural and social centre of the national capital, both in the former Czechoslovakia and the Czech Republic, hosting concerts, balls, conferences, fashion shows, and sporting events. Over time, some of the most prominent local and international artists have performed at the venue.

After the Velvet Revolution of 1989, Lucerna Palace was returned in restitution to the Havel family and is now part-owned by Ivan Havel's widow, Dagmar Havlová Ilkovičová.

== National cultural monument ==
The complex has been listed as a cultural monument since 1976. In 2017, it was named a national cultural monument.

== Gallery ==
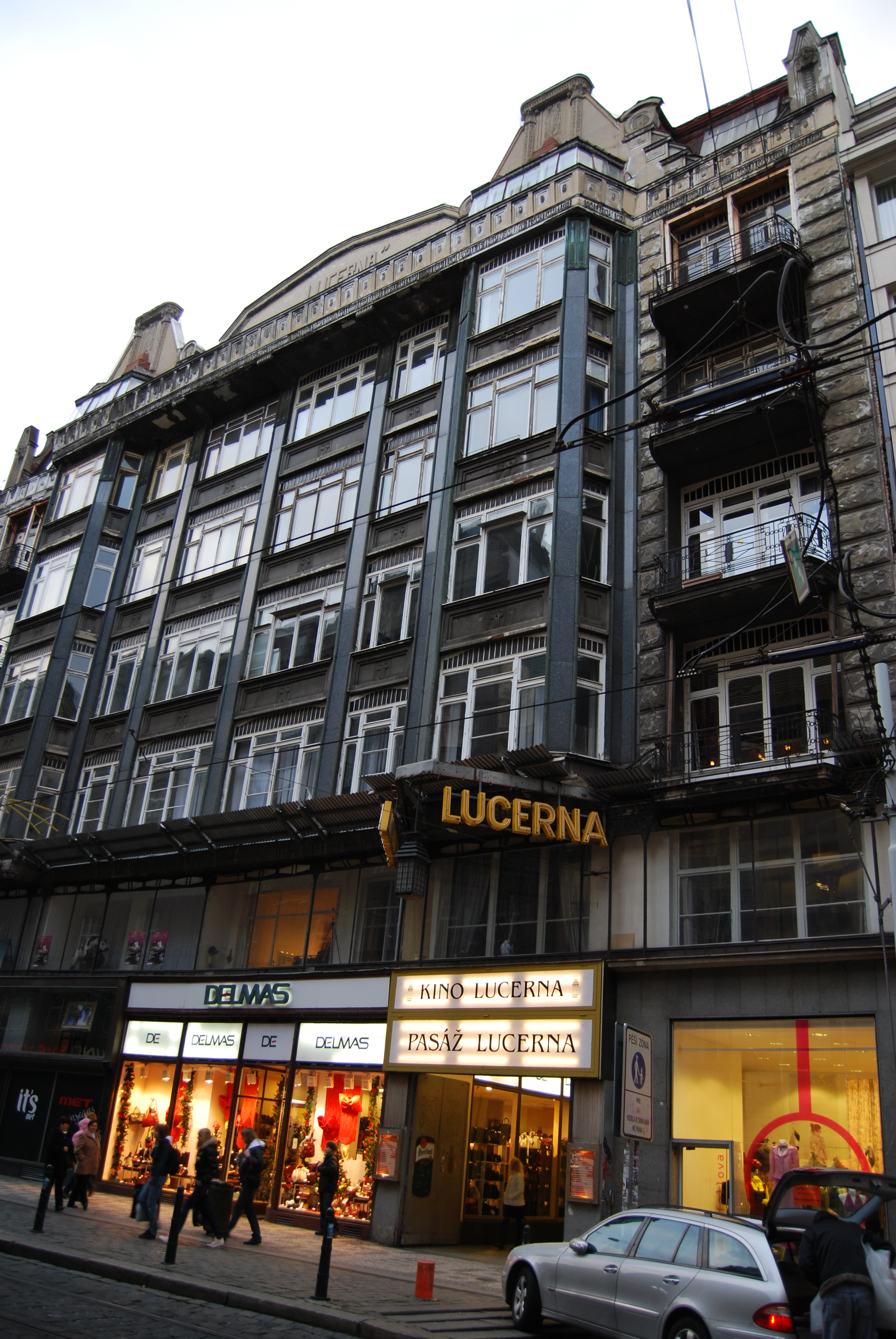
View from Vodičkova street

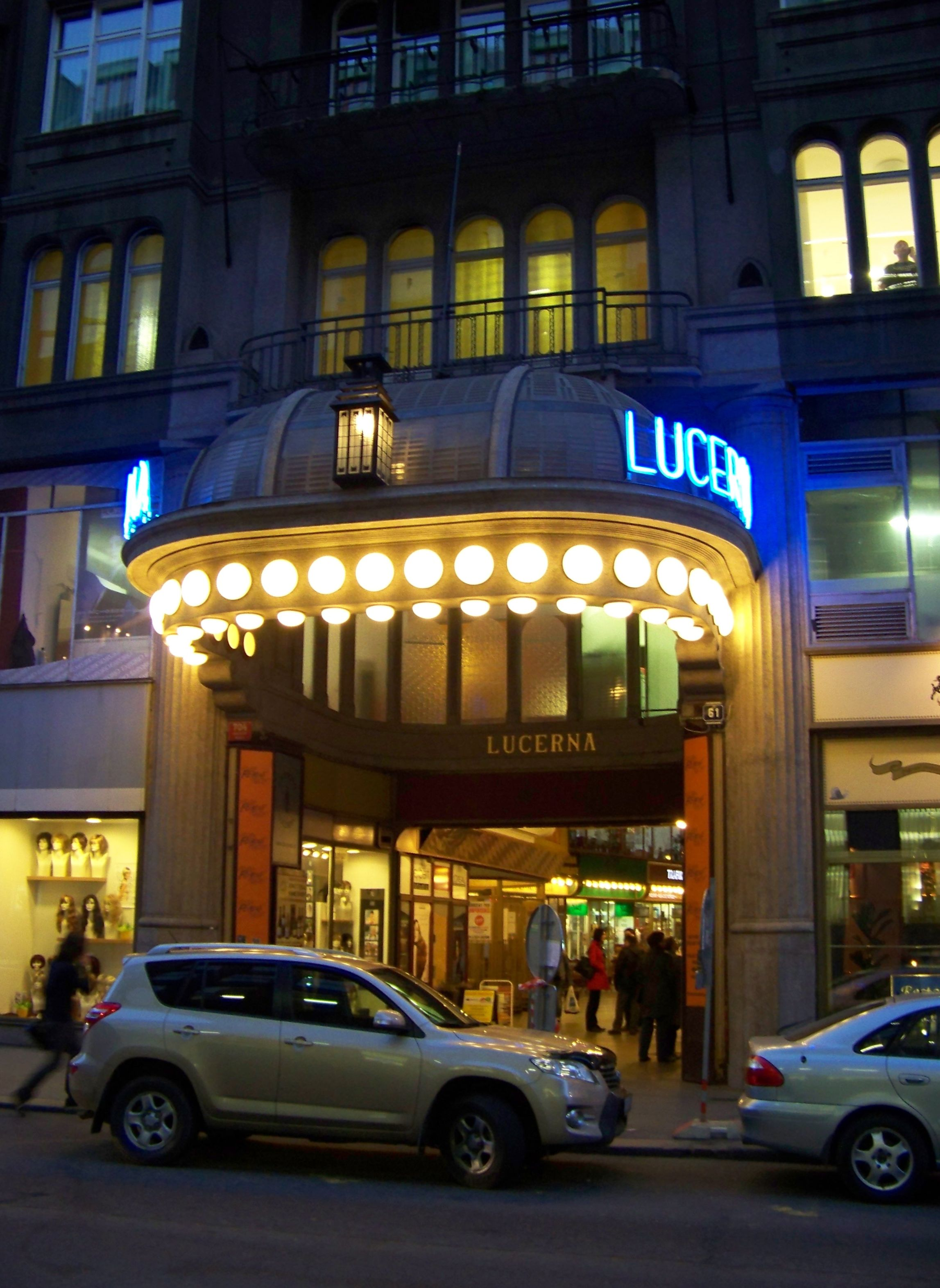
Entrance to Lucerna Music Bar from Štěpánská street

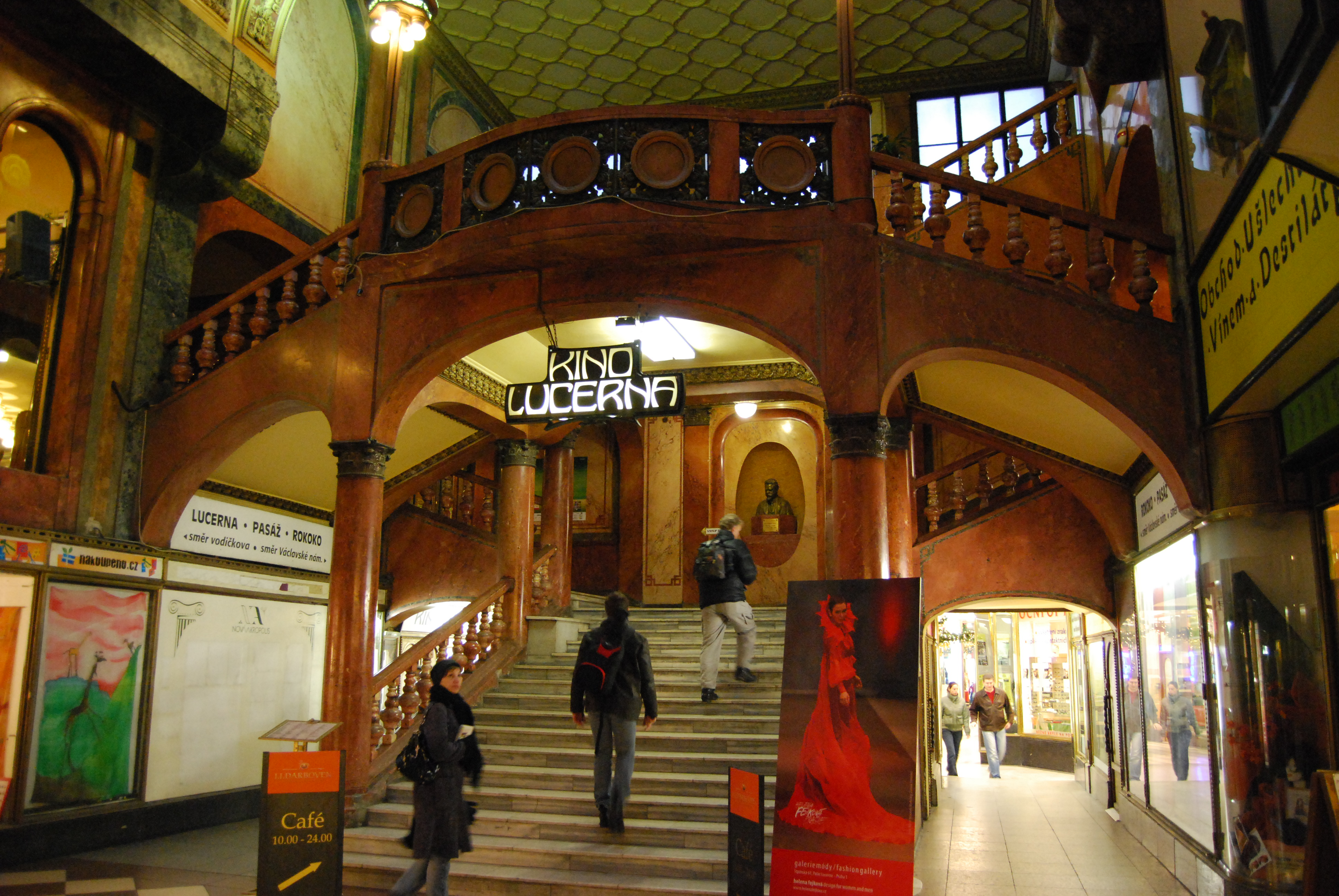
Cinema entrance

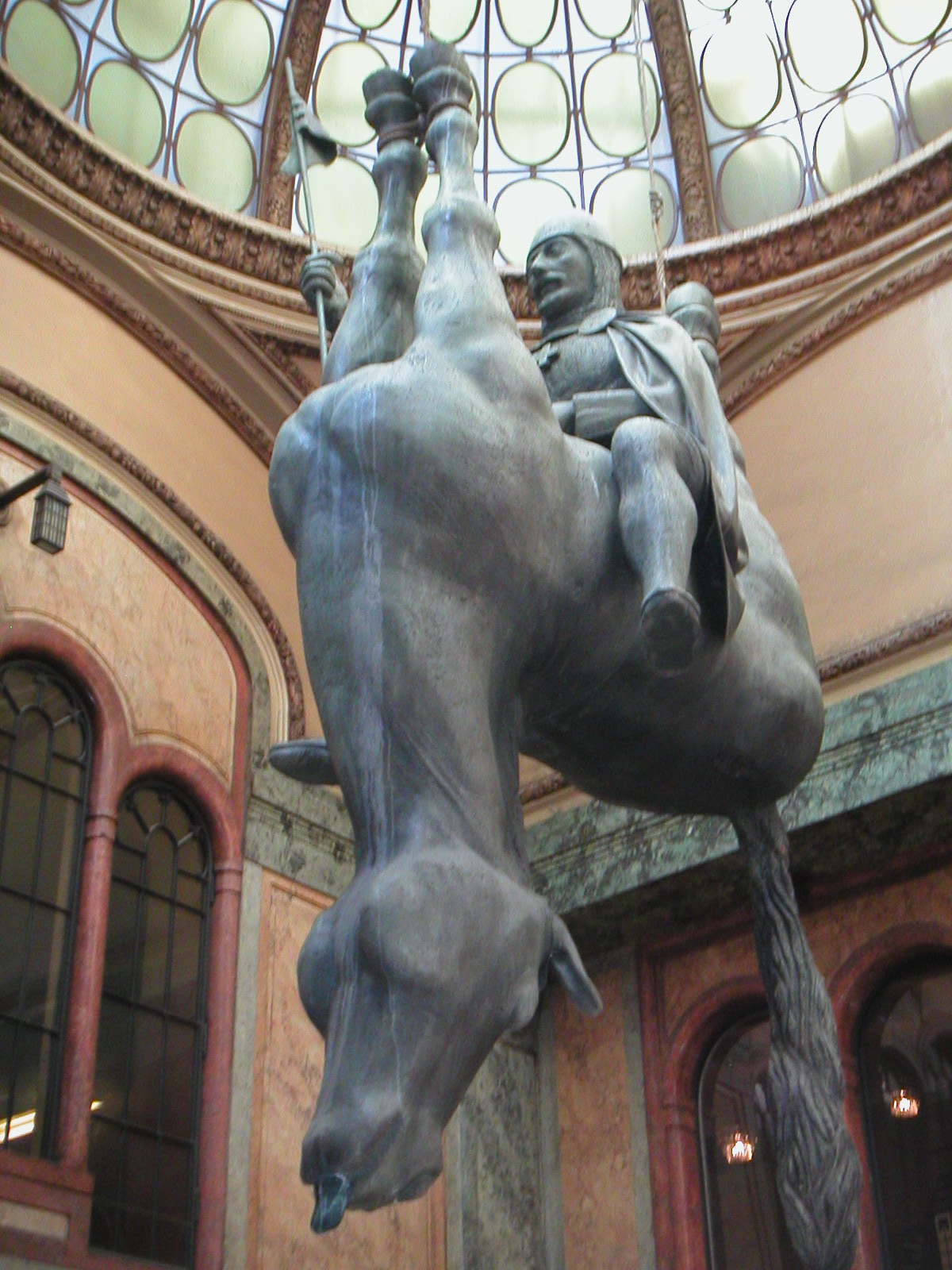
David Černý's statue Kůň

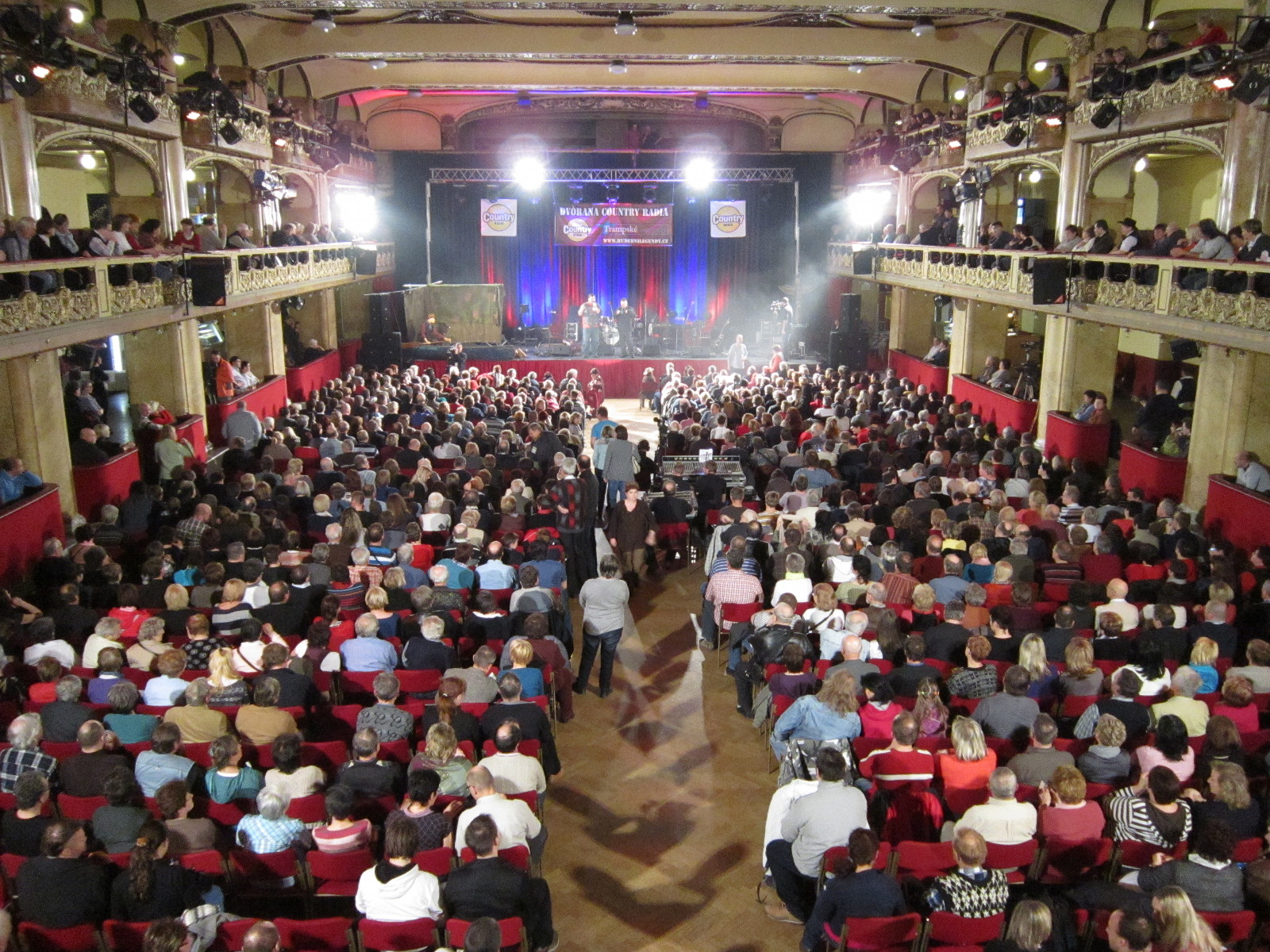
Great Hall

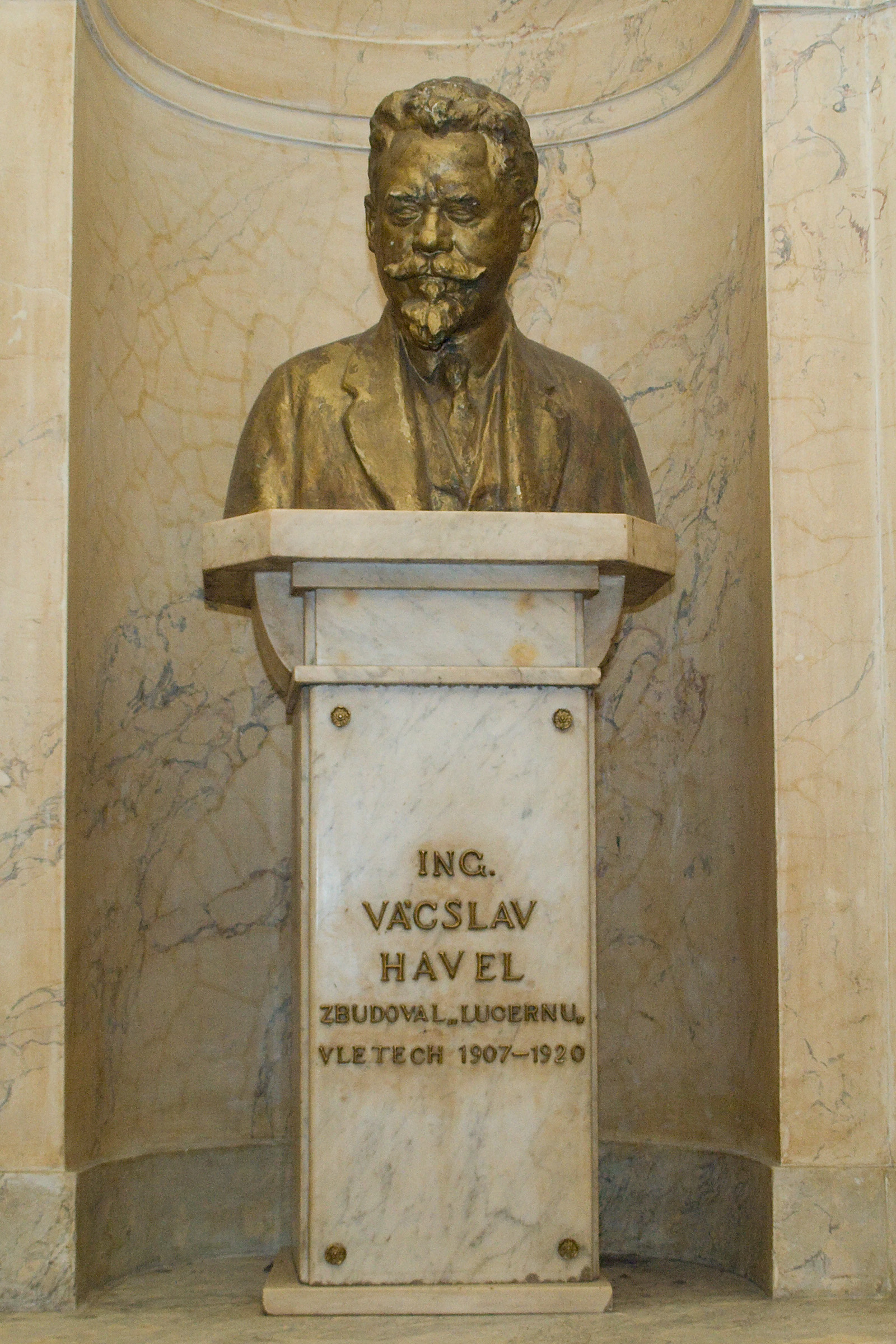
Bust of Lucerna founder Vácslav Havel by Jan Štursa
