= Marián Varga =

Slovak musician (1947–2017)

Marian Varga
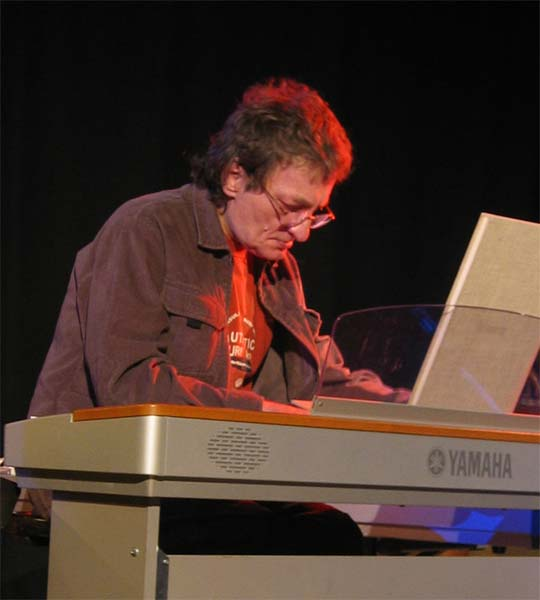
- Varga in 2004
- Born: 29 January 1947; Skalica, Czechoslovakia
- Died: 9 August 2017 (aged 70); Bratislava, Slovakia
- Occupations: Composer; organist
- Musical career
- Instruments: Hammond organ; piano; Moog synthesizer
- Website: www.marianvarga.sk

Marián Varga (29 January 1947 – 9 August 2017) was a Slovak musician, composer and organist. In the context of Czech-Slovak musical culture of the second half of the 20th century, Varga was a significant figure in the field of autonomous, modern classical music, rock music, as well as improvised or experimental music. In 1967, he became a member of the band Prúdy, with whom he recorded and co-wrote the legendary album Zvoňte, Zvonky. Influenced by Brian Auger and Keith Emerson, Marián Varga founded the progressive rock band Collegium Musicum in 1969, whose albums Konvergencie, Zelená pošta, Live and Divergencie represent the main pillars of Czech-Slovak rock music. He died on 9 August 2017 after several health problems, including cancer and lung disease.

== Discography ==
=== With Prúdy ===
- 1968: Zvoňte, zvonky

=== Collegium Musicum ===
- 1970: "Hommage à J.S.Bach / Ulica plná plášťov do dažďa" (SP)
- 1971: Collegium Musicum
- 1971: Konvergencie
- 1973: Collegium Musicum Live
- 1975: Marián Varga & Collegium Musicum
- 1978: Continuo
- 1979: On a Ona
- 1981: Divergencie
- 1997: Collegium Musicum '97 (Live)

=== With Pavol Hammel ===
- 1972: Zelená pošta
- 1976: Na II. programe sna (along with Radim Hladik)
- 1978: Cyrano z predmestia
- 1989: Všetko je inak
- 1993: Labutie piesne

=== With Vladimír Merta ===
- 1992: Cestou k ... Stabil - Instabil

=== Solo albums ===
- 1984: Stále tie dni
- 2003: Solo in Concert (Live)
- 2006: Marián Varga & Moyzesovo kvarteto

=== Anthology ===
- 2006: Hommage à Marián Varga

== Awards ==
- Hall of Fame ZAI Award – Grand Prix
- Aurel Award – Lifetime Achievement
- Pribina Cross – 2nd Class

== See also ==
- The 100 Greatest Slovak Albums of All Time
- 2003: Zostane to medzi nami
