= Fedor Frešo =

Slovak musician (1947–2018)

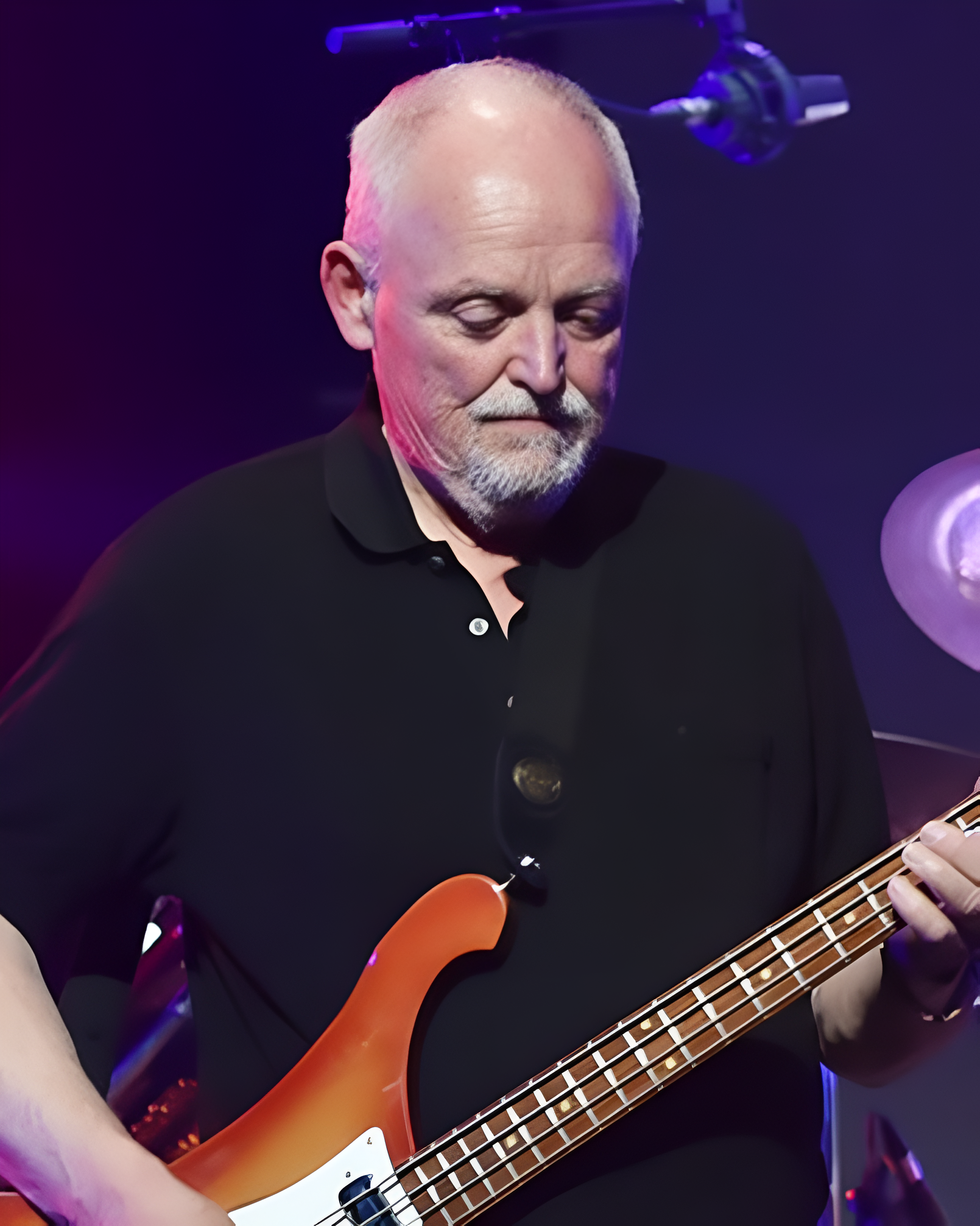
- Frešo performing in 2017

Background information
- Born: 6 January 1947; Bratislava, Czechoslovakia
- Died: 26 June 2018 (aged 71) Bratislava, Slovakia
- Genres: Rock; jazz
- Occupation: Musician
- Instruments: Bass guitar; vocals
- Years active: 1962–2018

Fedor Frešo (6 January 1947 – 26 June 2018) was a Slovak rock and jazz bassist and singer. He was the son of composer and Slovak National Theatre conductor Tibor Frešo. His mother was director and editor at the Czechoslovak radio in Bratislava.

Frešo studied double bass and bass guitar at a music conservatory. After finishing his studies, he became a radio producer and musical director. Up to 1989, he worked for Slovenský rozhlas.

Throughout his career, he played in several popular groups, including the Soulmen, Prúdy, Collegium Musicum, Fermata, T+R Band (with Peter Lipa), Traditional Club (with Ján Lehotský), and the Czechoslovak group Blue Effect.

In 2011, Frešo published the book Sideman, where he recounted his career, from his beginnings with the Soulmen to his latest concert with Marián Varga as a member of Collegium Musicum.

He died on 26 June 2018.
