= Pavol Hammel =

Slovak musician, singer and producer (born 1948)

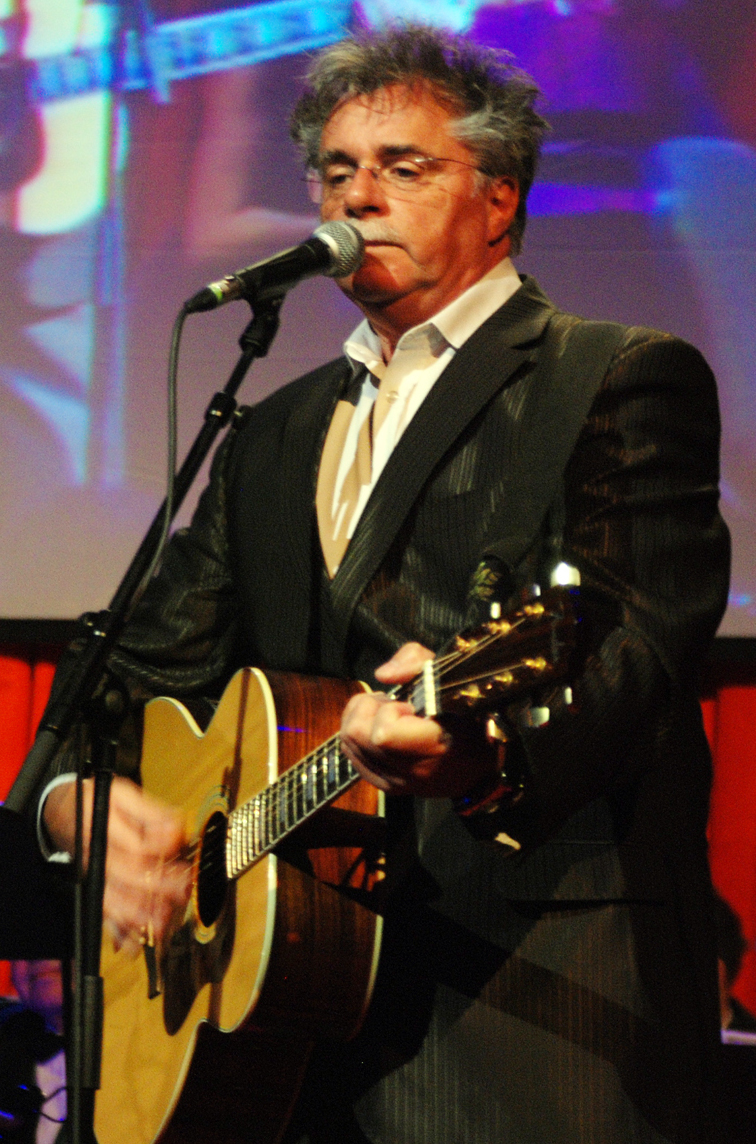

Background information
- Born: Pavol Hammel; 7 December 1948 (age 77); Bratislava, Czechoslovakia
- Origin: Bratislava, Slovakia
- Genres: psychedelic rock, baroque pop, pop, rock
- Occupations: Singer, composer, guitarist
- Instrument: Guitar
- Years active: 1965–present
- Website: www.pavolhammel.sk

Pavol Hammel (born 7 December 1948) is a Slovak musician, singer and producer.

Pavol Hammel was born on 7 December 1948 in Bratislava, to a family of musicians. His father played violin in the Slovak National Theatre, and influenced Pavol to become a promising violin player too.

He graduated from the Faculty of Law, Comenius University in Bratislava in 1976. He gained fame initially in the group Prúdy, which he founded in 1963, but has since established a successful solo career.

He is married and has two daughters.

== Discography ==
=== Studio albums ===
- Zvoňte zvonky (1969)
- Pokoj vám (1969)
- Pavol Hammel a Prúdy (1970)
- Som šťastný, keď ste šťastní (1971)
- Zelená pošta (1972)
- Šľahačková princezná (1973)
- Hráč (1975)
- Na II. programe sna (1976)
- Stretnutie s tichom (1978)
- On a Ona (1979)
- Vrabec vševed (1979)
- Faust a margréty (1980)
- Čas malín (1981)
- Now I Know (1982)
- Dnes už viem (1983)
- Všetko je inak (1989)
- Labutie piesne (1993)
- Život je... (1997)
- Prúdy 1999 (1999)
- Cyrano z predmestia (1999)
- Šálka čaju (2002)
- Starí kamoši (2002)
- Kreditka srdca (2004)
- Srdce bez anjela (2020)

== Prizes ==
- 1978 – Bratislava Golden Lyre for music to the song "Student Love"
- 1988 – Bratislava Bronze Lyre for music to the song "Today Love is an Anchor"
- 2009 – Paul Strauss Prize

== See also ==
- The 100 Greatest Slovak Albums of All Time
