= Big-beat (Eastern Bloc) =

Rock and pop music in Eastern European countries in the 1960s

Big-beat (also called big beat, or bigbit) was a 1960s music scene made up of rock and roll, jazz, and twist groups in Eastern Bloc countries. The term was coined as the name "rock and roll" was not approved by authorities in these nations.

== Background ==
Genres of American origin, such as jazz, twist, and especially rock and roll were banned or at least hardly tolerated in Eastern Bloc countries in the mid-20th century. Such music was considered to be an element of American imperialism. Despite the official attitude, a number of jazz bands formed in the Eastern Bloc. In the 1950s, these bands included rock and roll elements in their performances. The first Polish band that played rock and roll was Rhythm and Blues, formed in 1959, and they were forced by the authorities to disband a year later. The manager of Rhythm and Blues, Franciszek Walicki, to avoid the term rock and roll, coined the term "big-beat" to refer to the band's music. In Walicki's intention, it was a pure synonym of rock and roll, but the name became widely used in reference to any popular music with a strong rhythm and a simple melodic structure, such as rhythm and blues, madison, or twist.

Walicki went on to form new bands, including Czerwono-Czarni and Niebiesko-Czarni, and rock and roll under the name "big-beat" became popular in Poland from the early 1960s. In Czechoslovakia and Hungary, it happened in the middle of that decade. The first rock and roll concert in the Soviet Union was performed at the Ministry of Foreign Affairs in 1966. However, in the USSR, rock was performed without a specific genre name, and rock groups were called "vocal and instrumental bands" (VIA). In Poland and Czechoslovakia, the term "big beat" or "bigbit" was mostly used, while in Hungary, it was called "beat".

In 1970s Poland, rock became called "young generation music", and it changed as progressive rock or electronic music emerged. By the 1980s, the name "rock" was accepted by the authorities.

== Later uses of the term ==
After genre names such as rock and roll were finally allowed in the Eastern Bloc, the term "big-beat" fell into obscurity. However, it made a return in the 1990s, this time on the international sphere. Rather than referring to rock genres, it became the name for a new style of electronic dance music pioneered by artists such as the Prodigy and Fatboy Slim, among others.
