= Marika Gombitová discography =

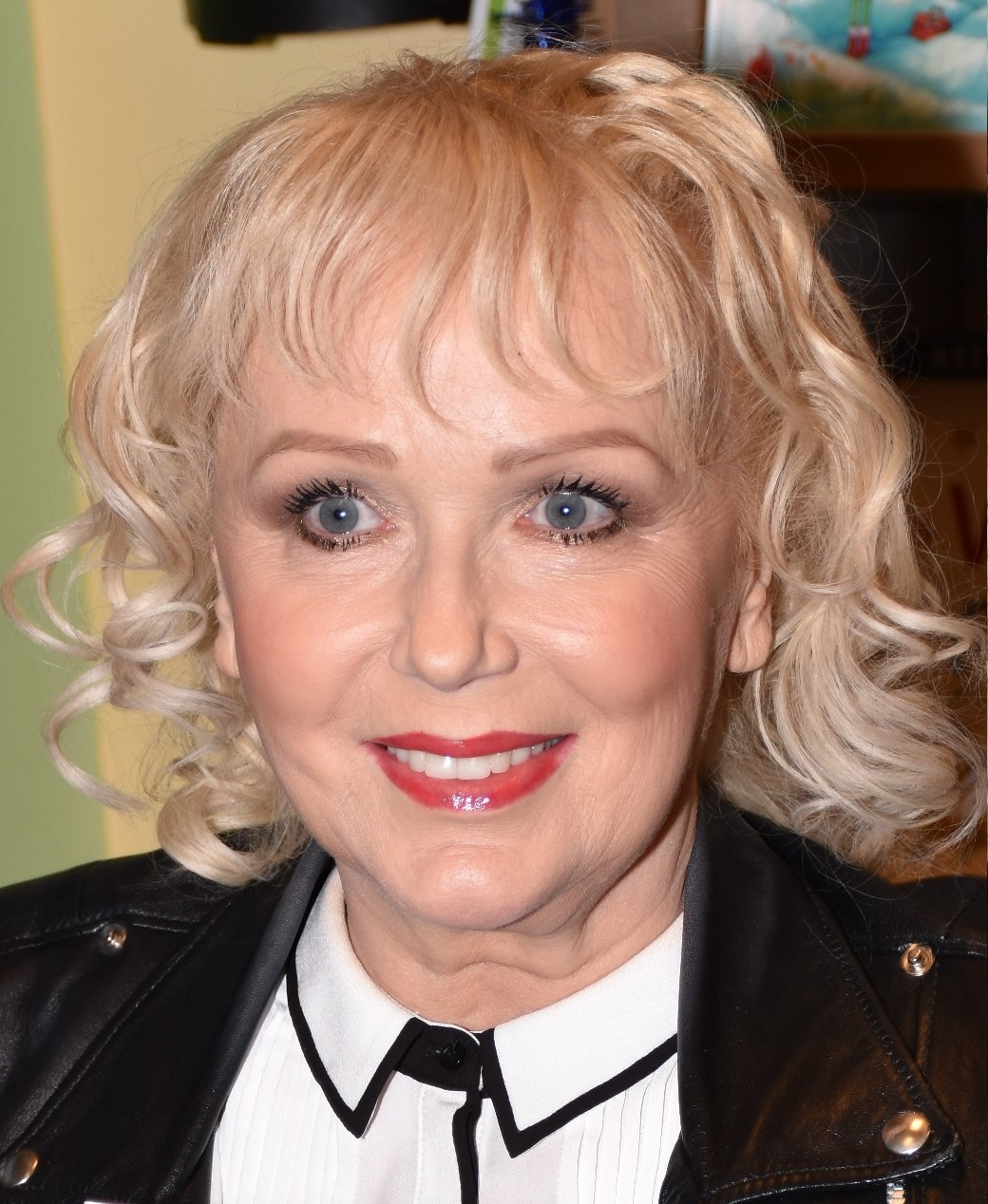

Releases:
Studio albums	14
Compilation albums	16
Soundtrack albums	3
Limited editions	1
Export albums	4
EPs	1
Singles	26
B-sides	10
Other appearances	26
Unreleased songs	28
Video albums	1
Music videos	42

Slovak recording artist Marika Gombitová entered the music industry in 1975 by recording promotional compositions entitled "Karta" and "Nájdem hviezdu" for SRo Košice. Prior to that, she performed with local bands such as Profily (1971–73) and the orchestras of Juraj Szabadoš, respectively of Július Olajoš (1974–75). Following an offer to become a member of Ján Lehotský's ensemble, she joined Modus in 1976 as their only female vocalist. Simultaneously with staging for the group, Gombitová recorded a number of tracks as soloist; among others also "Čo má rieka" and "Deň ako z pohľadnice". Eventually, "Boľavé námestie" was released as her own debut single issued on OPUS Records in 1977.

Her solo breakthrough came along with the second single release "Študentská láska." The song won two awards at the Bratislavská lýra, being classified as the most selling SP in Slovakia in July 1978. By the end of next year, Gombitová issued a debut album called Dievča do dažďa (1979), of which total sale surpassed 200,000 copies. In addition, the set would be ranked in a critics' survey published by Nový čas as the 20th Best Slovak Album of All Time. Furthermore, the album's lead single "Vyznanie," received several music awards, including a prize at the 4th Intervision Song Festival in Sopot, Poland in 1980. Regrettably on December 1, 1980, shortly before launching her second set Môj malý príbeh, singer sustained serious injuries upon her return from a concert. After her partial recovery, she successfully returned to the studios and continued in publishing a new material; though, as a physically disabled artist since 1981.

Until now, Gombitová released ten studio albums, including one double set — Dievča do dažďa (1979), Môj malý príbeh (1981), Slnečný kalendár (1982), Mince na dne fontán (1983), №5 (1984), Voľné miesto v srdci (1986), Ateliér duše (1987), Kam idú ľudia? (1990) and Zostaň (1994). Each of them on OPUS, with exception of her final record issued by H&V Jumbo Records. Along with Modus, Gombitová recorded four album releases — Modus (1979), Balíček snov (1980), 99 zápaliek (1981) and Záhradná kaviareň (1983). She also participated on the Collegium Musicum's art rock project On a Ona (1979), as well as contributed to three original soundtracks — Smoliari (1979), Neberte nám princeznú (1980) and Tisícročná včela (1983). Her retrospective compilations consist of ten collections, two of which are double sets — Moje najmilšie (1985), Polnočné otázky: 16 Naj 1984–1993 (1993), The Best of the Best (1998), Gold (2005), Vyznanie (2007), Na Bratislavskej Lýre (2008), Duetá (2010) and Single (2016). Apart from four export releases, her discography also features EP Slávnosť úprimných slov (1987), video album Ateliér duše (1987), and twenty-six singles in total.

"Rýchly spád"
One of the singer's earliest and unreleased songs by now, co-written by Peter Nagy.

According to ČNS IFPI, the International Federation of the Phonographic Industry for the Czech Republic and Slovakia, Marika Gombitová demonstrably sold at least one million vinyl albums.

== Albums ==
=== Studio albums ===
Year	Album details	Top positions			Sales	Certifications
Year	Album details	Charts		GSA	Sales	Certifications
Year	Album details	SK	CZ	GSA	Sales	Certifications
1979	Dievča do dažďa: Label: OPUS (#9116 0858); Format: LP; cassette; CD			20	SK: 200,000	—
1981	Môj malý príbeh: Label: OPUS (#9113 1149); Format: LP; cassette; CD			—		—
1982	Slnečný kalendár: Label: OPUS (#9113 1259); Format: LP; cassette; CD			49		—
1983	Mince na dne fontán: Label: OPUS (#9113 1354/5); Format: 2×LP; 2×cassette; 2×CD			30		Gold
1984	№5: Label: OPUS (#9113 1562); Format: LP; cassette; CD			75		—
1986	Voľné miesto v srdci: Label: OPUS (#9113 1731); Format: LP; cassette; CD			66		—
1987	Ateliér duše: Label: OPUS (#9313 1915); Format: LP; cassette; CD	8		43		—
1990	Kam idú ľudia?: Label: OPUS (#9353 2214); Format: LP; cassette; CD			—		—
1994	Zostaň: Label: Jumbo (#0025 2311); Format: cassette; CD	15		—		—
with Modus
1979	Modus^{[A]}: Label: OPUS (#9116 0856); Format: LP; cassette; CD			41		—
1980	Balíček snov^{[A]}: Label: OPUS (#9116 0999); Format: LP; cassette; CD			—		—
1981	99 zápaliek^{[A]}: Label: OPUS (#9113 1215); Format: LP; cassette; CD			37		—
1983	Záhradná kaviareň^{[A]}: Label: OPUS (#9113 1346); Format: LP; cassette; CD			—		—
"—" denotes an album that did not chart or was not released in that region.

=== Compilation albums ===
Year	Album details	Top positions			Sales	Certifications
Year	Album details	Charts		GSA	Sales	Certifications
Year	Album details	SK	CZ	GSA	Sales	Certifications
1985	Moje najmilšie: Label: OPUS (#9113 1599); Format: LP; cassette; CD			—		—
1993	Polnočné otázky: 16 Naj 1984–1993: Label: OPUS (#91 2410); Format: cassette; CD			—		—
1998	The Best of the Best: Label: Open (#0065-2312); Format: 2×CD			—		—
2005	Gold: Label: OPUS (#91 2701); Format: CD		15	—	SK: 28,000	Gold; 4× Platinum
2007	Vyznanie: Label: OPUS (#91 2784); Format: 2×CD		23	—	SK: 12,000	2× Platinum
2010	Duetá: Label: OPUS (#91 2825); Format: CD			—		—
2016	Single: Label: OPUS (#8584019004027); Format: download			—		—
with Modus
1987	Zrkadlo rokov: Label: OPUS (#9113 1867); Format: LP; cassette			—		—
1995	The Best of 1977–1988: Vol 1: Label: Open (#0033 2312); Format: 2×CD			—		—
1998	The Best of 1979–1988: Vol 2: Label: Open (#0064 2312); Format: 2×CD			—		—
1998	Úsmev: Label: Bonton (#49 1722); Format: CD			—		—
2005	Gold: Label: OPUS (#91 2708); Format: CD			—		—
"—" denotes an album that did not chart or was not released in that region.

=== Soundtrack albums ===
Year	Album details	Top positions			Sales	Certifications
Year	Album details	Charts		GSA	Sales	Certifications
Year	Album details	SK	CZ	GSA	Sales	Certifications
1979	Smoliari^{[B]}: Label: OPUS (#9116 0743); Format: LP, CD			—		—
2001	Neberte nám princeznú^{[B]}: Label: BMG (#74321 90447); Format: CD			27	SK: 9,000	Gold; Platinum
2003	V obrazech II by Petr Hapka: Label: B&M (#981 574–8); Format: CD		22	—		—
"—" denotes an album that did not chart or was not released in that region.

=== Limited editions ===
Year	Album details	Notes
2008	Na Bratislavskej Lýre: Label: OPUS (#91 0016); Format: CD	Ten track compilation issued at the occasion of the 1st anniversary of Žurnál weekly, featuring a live version of "Cukráreň na dlani námestia" from 1985.

=== Export albums ===
Year	Album details	Notes
1981	Rainy Day Girl: Label: OPUS (#9116 0973); Format: LP; cassette; CD; download	English version of her debut album from 1979, issued on CD in 2008 as a bonus disc of Dievča do dažďa: 2CD Collectors Edition (#91 2791).
1984	My Friend the Tree: Label: OPUS (#9113 1586); Format: LP; cassette; download	English version of her fourth studio album from 1983, available only on LP and CC. The original release consisted of two albums, though.
1985	№5: Label: OPUS (#9113 1624); Format: LP; cassette; download	English version of her fifth studio album of the same name from 1984. However, the export release is available only on LP and CC until now.
with Modus
1980	Modus^{[A]}: Label: OPUS (#9113 0974); Format: LP; cassette; CD	English version of the Modus' debut album. Songs featuring Gombitová were issued in 2008 on Slnečný kalendár: 2CD Collectors Edition (#91 2793).

Notes

- A All tracks released on Modus studio albums were later issued on a bonus CD of her own double set Slnečný kalendár: 2CD Collectors Edition (#91 2793) in 2008, including English versions of the Modus export release.
- B Gombitová's contributions to soundtracks Smoliari and Neberte nám princeznú were also released altogether on a bonus disc of her double set Môj malý príbeh: 2CD Collectors Edition (#91 2792) in 2007.

== Extended plays ==
Year	EP details	Notes
1987	Slávnosť úprimných slov^{[C]}: Label: OPUS (#9183 0305); Format: 7-inch	Five track Christmas EP, featuring also songs recorded in collaboration with V.Patejdl, J.Lehotský and R.Müller, plus a track by Detský zbor ČSRo.

Notes

- C Tracks performed by Gombitová were in addition available also on CD as bonus tracks of Ateliér duše 2004 re-release (#91 2561).

== Singles ==
=== As lead artist ===
Year	Single details	Catalogue	Charts		Album	Label
Year	Single details	Catalogue	SK	CZ	Album	Label
1977	"Boľavé námestie"	#9143 0446			non-album single	OPUS
1978	"Študentská láska"	#9143 0470	1		OPUS '78	OPUS
1978	"Študentská láska"	#S-308	1		OPUS '78	Tonpress
1979	"Vyznanie"	#9143 0500			Dievča do dažďa	OPUS
1980	"Kufor a šál" (featuring Ján Lehotský)	#9143 0521			Dievča do dažďa	OPUS
1980	"Domy na zbúranie"^{[D]} (featuring Modus)	#9143 0522			OPUS '79	OPUS
1980	"Svet stromov"	#9143 0528			Môj malý príbeh	OPUS
1980	"Cirkusový kôň"	#9143 0539			Môj malý príbeh	OPUS
1981	"Chcem sa s tebou deliť"	#9143 0545			Sopot 80	Wifon
1982	"Srdcia dievčat"	#9143 0561			Slnečný kalendár	OPUS
1986	"Nenápadná"^{[E]}	#9143 0664	3		non-album single	OPUS
1989	"Tváre pred zrkadlom"/"Ave Mária"	#9143 0739	2		non-album single	OPUS
1994	"Paradiso"	#0023 3331			Zostaň	Jumbo
2001	"Nespáľme to krásne v nás" (with Miroslav Žbirka)	—			Modrý album	Universal
2015	"Ten príbeh za náš sen stál"	#2564605390	—	—	non-album single	Monitor
"—" denotes a single that did not chart or was not released in that region.

=== As featured artist ===
Year	Single details	Catalogue	Charts		Album	Label
Year	Single details	Catalogue	SK	CZ	Album	Label
1977	"Veľký sen mora"^{[F]} (with Modus)	#9143 0438			non-album single	OPUS
1977	"Margaréta"^{[F]} (with Modus)	#9143 0439			non-album single	OPUS
1977	"Úsmev" (with Modus)	#9143 0440			OPUS '77	OPUS
1977	"Zažni"^{[F]} (with Miroslav Žbirka)	#9143 0441			non-album single	OPUS
1977	"Stará láska"^{[F]} (with Modus)	#9143 04			non-album single	OPUS
1977	"Letná láska"^{[F]} (with Modus and Miroslav Žbirka)	#9143 0450			OPUS '78	OPUS
1977	"Známy tón"^{[F]} (with Modus and Miroslav Žbirka)	#9143 0461			non-album single	OPUS
1978	"Dievčatá"^{[F]} (with Modus and Miroslav Žbirka)	#9143 0471			OPUS '78	OPUS
1980	"Mágovo číslo"^{[F]} (with Modus)	#9143 0540			non-album single	OPUS
1983	"Záhradná kaviareň" (with Modus)	#9143 0595			Záhradná kaviareň	OPUS
"—" denotes a single that did not chart or was not released in that region.

=== Other charted songs ===
Year	Single details	Charts				Album	Label
Year	Single details	SK		CZ		Album	Label
Year	Single details	50	100	50	100	Album	Label
2005	"Tajnosľubná" (with Miroslav Žbirka)	—	—	35	—	Dúhy^{[G]}	Universal
2007	"Tak som chcela všetkých milovať"^{[H]}	20	63	—	—	Vyznanie	OPUS
"—" denotes a single that did not chart or was not released in that region.

Notes

- D Initially, the work was credited to Gombitová herself on the VA compilation OPUS '79 (#9113 0816).
- E "Nenápadná" was classified as the fourth most selling SP on Top 5 of the Slovak Year End Chart in 1987.
- F Denotes a single with featuring only her background vocals.
- G Žbirka's album Dúhy charted in 2005 at #12 on the Czech Albums chart.
- H "Tak som chcela všetkých milovať" was issued only as a promotional single. In 2008, the composition was in addition remixed by Jarek Šimek.

== Other appearances ==
Year	Song	Notes
1976	"Zo všetkých slov" (with Modus)	Appears on CD 99 zápaliek: Komplet 4 by Modus (#45 5361) released in 2000 on Sony/Bonton, featuring only her background vocals.
1977	"S tou nádejou choď spať" (with Ján Lehotský)	Appears on CD compilation Duetá (#91 2825), released in 2010 on OPUS.
1978	"Deň" (with TOČR)	Appears only on VA vinyl album Mladá pieseň on OPUS (#9116 0579).
1978	"Luk a šíp" (with VV Systém)	A cover version of the Paris Sisters' hit (#5 on the US Billboard Hot 100) from 1961 appears only on VA vinyl album Diskotéka OPUSu 1 (OPUS #9113 0745).
1978	"Zimná pieseň" (with Taktici)	Both tracks appear on VA vinyl album Diskotéka OPUSu 2 (#9116 0667), on CD released in 2002 on the re-issue of Slnečný kalendár album (#50 7832) on Sony/Bonton.
1978	"Letná pieseň" (with Taktici)	Both tracks appear on VA vinyl album Diskotéka OPUSu 2 (#9116 0667), on CD released in 2002 on the re-issue of Slnečný kalendár album (#50 7832) on Sony/Bonton.
1978	"Studentenliebe"	German version of "Študentská láska". Appears on VA compilation Internationales Schlagerfestival Dresden '78 (#855 625), issued by Amiga in GDR.
1979	"Nobelova cena za lásku" (with Pavol Hammel)	Songs from the Gombitová's studio session with Collegium Musicum appears on their studio album On a Ona (#9113 0727) on OPUS.
1979	"Amori" (with Ľudovít Nosko)	Songs from the Gombitová's studio session with Collegium Musicum appears on their studio album On a Ona (#9113 0727) on OPUS.
1979	"Rozhodnutia II" (with Ľudovít Nosko)	Songs from the Gombitová's studio session with Collegium Musicum appears on their studio album On a Ona (#9113 0727) on OPUS.
1979	"Mášmarád"	Songs from the Gombitová's studio session with Collegium Musicum appears on their studio album On a Ona (#9113 0727) on OPUS.
1979	"Prstienky z trávy"	Appears on VA vinyl album Diskotéka OPUSu 3 (#9113 0873). On CD issued on the 2002 re-release of Slnečný kalendár (#50 7832) on Sony/Bonton, respectively on her 2CD Vyznanie in 2007.
1979	"Študentská láska" (Big beat version) (with Vivat)	Appears exclusively on VA vinyl compilation Technoexport Bratislava: 10.výročie (#9113 0926), released by OPUS.
1979	"Ružový smútok"	Appears on VA vinyl Diskotéka OPUSu 4 (#9116 0935), on CD issued in 2002 on the re-release of Slnečný kalendár (#50 7832) on Sony/Bonton.
1980	"Včielka" (with VV Systém)	A cover version of the Gloria Gaynor's UK hit (#44 from August 1975) appears only on VA vinyl compilation Diskotéka OPUSu 5 (#9113 0959).
1980	"Chcem sa s tebou deliť" (Live)	A live version of the song taken from the 4th Intervision Song Contest was released in Poland on the VA compilation Sopot 80 by Wifon (#MC-0137).
1983	"Čas zelených zrkadiel"	Appears as a bonus track on the 2004 re-issue of Voľné miesto v srdci (#91 1731).
1990	"Zem menom láska" (Live)	Appears on double album Nežná revolúcia (OPUS #9017 2240/41), recorded live on November 24, 1989.
1990	"Ži a nechaj žiť" (Live)	Appears on double album Nežná revolúcia (OPUS #9017 2240/41), recorded live on November 24, 1989.
1997	"Domy na zbúranie" (Vital Remix)	Appears on CD Good Vibes: Remixes by Double L & Vinyl Culture (PolyGram #539 531)
1997	"V období dažďa" (Drumatic Remix)	Appears on CD Good Vibes: Remixes by Double L & Vinyl Culture (PolyGram #539 531)
2000	"Prosba"	Appears on CD compilation 100 let české a slovenské písničky 3, released by Sony/Bonton in 2001 (#50 2371) as the first track written solely by herself.
2008	"Chlapci v pasci" (Jarek Šimek Remix)	Both songs remixed by Jaroslav Šimek were released as free-download singles. (In addition, Šimek also remixed "Tak som chcela všetkých milovať").
2008	"V období dažďa" (Jarek Šimek Remix)	Both songs remixed by Jaroslav Šimek were released as free-download singles. (In addition, Šimek also remixed "Tak som chcela všetkých milovať").
2011	"Tak si so mnou opakuj" (Shino Vano Remix)	A download single remixed by Shino Vano, featuring on his project Risk Of Deafness Vol.7
2012	"Vianočný popevok" (Saluberrimae Remix)	A DJ single remixed by Saluberrimae.
B-sides
1976	"Ty vieš, mama"	B-side of "Boľavé námestie" single from 1977, issued on CD on the 2000 re-issue of Dievča do dažďa album (#49 7691).
1976	"Záhadná" (with Modus and Miroslav Žbirka)	B-side of "Margaréta" single from 1977, featuring only her background vocals.
1977	"Preteky s láskou" (with Modus)	B-side of "Veľký sen mora" single, featuring only her background vocals.
1977	"Správa o ľuďoch" (with Modus and Miroslav Žbirka)	B-side of "Zažni" single, featuring only her background vocals.
1977	"Deň ako z pohľadnice"	B-side of Modus' single "Úsmev". In 1978, both songs were released on a VA compilation OPUS '77 (#9113 0605). Gombitová's track was issued on CD on the re-release of Dievča do dažďa (#49 7691) in 2000, respectively in 2007 on her 2CD Vyznanie.
1977	"Drahá" (with Modus and Miroslav Žbirka)	B-side of "Známy tón" single. In 1979, issued on VA vinyl compilation OPUS '78 (OPUS #9113 0692).
1978	"Čím viac máš" (with Modus and Miroslav Žbirka)	B-side of "Dievčatá" single, featuring only her background vocals.
1979	"V slepých uličkách" (with Miroslav Žbirka)	B-side on Žbirka's single "Klaun z domu č. 6" as well issued on his album Doktor Sen (OPUS #9116 1000). In 2007, the song was attached to Gombitová's 2CD compilation Vyznanie.
1981	"Výmeny"	B-side of "Chcem sa s tebou deliť" single. In 2001, both sides were released on CD on a re-issue of Môj malý príbeh album (#50 4534) by Sony/Bonton.
1986	"Mami, mami"	B-side of "Nenápadná" single, on CD initially released on her 1993's compilation Polnočné otázky: 16 Naj 1984–1993.

Notes

- H Modrý album by Žbirka peaked at number #11 on the Czech Albums Chart.

=== Unreleased songs ===
Year	Song	Notes
1975	"Karta"	Compositions by unknown writers recorded for the SRo Košice archive
1975	"Nájdem hviezdu"	Compositions by unknown writers recorded for the SRo Košice archive
1976	"Lúčenie"	A song by Ján Lehotský and Ľuboš Zeman recorded live for STV's Chvíľa pre pesničku.
1976	"Túto pieseň spievam vám"	A song by Lehotský and Alexander Karšay also recorded live for Chvíľa pre pesničku.
1976	"Skúšam nájsť"	A song by unknown writers recorded for SRo.
1977	"Nebuď sám" (with TOČR)	A song by Igor Bázlik and Ján Štrasser recorded for SRo.
1977	"Vdýchni lásku písmenám"	A song by František Slavkovský and Vlasta Brezovská recorded for SRo.
1977	"Čo má rieka"	A song by Lehotský and Karšay recorded for STV's Kde lúčne ticho nájsť.
1977	"Ostrov v prúde"	Compositions by Karol Witz and Peter Nagy recorded for SRo Košice.
1977	"Rýchly spád"	Compositions by Karol Witz and Peter Nagy recorded for SRo Košice.
1978	"A ja, taká dzivočka" (with Bezinky)	A Folk song recorded for STV's Takú nám, hudba, zahraj.
1978	"Každá žena klame svojho manžela"	A song by Bázlik and Tomáš Janovic recorded for STV's Móda nevyjde z módy.
1978	"Mozartov koncert"	A song by W.A.Mozart and Ľubomír Feldek also recorded for Móda nevyjde z módy.
1978	"Žena je váza"	Ali Brezovský and Štrasser also recorded for Móda nevyjde z módy.
1978	"Náhodou"^{[I]}	A song by Ivan Horváth and Alojz Čobej recorded for SRo.
1978	"Trojka"	A Russian folk song, co-written by Ladislav Luknár, also recorded for SRo.
1979	"Každej sa ten vlastný páči" (with Zora Kolínska and Marcela Laiferová)	A song by Karol Elbert and Ivan Krajíček recorded for STV's Kytica k sviatku.
1979	"Mám čas"	A song co-written by Krajíček also for Kytica k sviatku.
1980	"Klietka so zlatom"	A song co-written by Kamil Peteraj.
1983	"Píseň" (Film version)	A song written by Hapka and Feldek for Tisícročná včela.
1983	"Bosá láska"	Compositions co-written by Peteraj, probably from 1983.
1983	"September"	Compositions co-written by Peteraj, probably from 1983.
1985	"Koncert našej lásky" (with Fermáta and Róbert Grigorov)	A song written by herself and Peteraj for STV's movie Obyčajný deň.
1987	"Hrajme píseň" (with Karel Gott, Josef Laufer and Věra Galatíková)	A cover of Milk and Honey's "Hallelujah", written by Kobi Oshrat. Czech lyrics supplied Zdeněk Borovec for ČT's Abeceda G+L.
1987	"Pa a Pi"	Compositions written by Karel Svoboda along with Peteraj for the STV's miniseries Pa a Pi.
1987	"Líška"	Compositions written by Karel Svoboda along with Peteraj for the STV's miniseries Pa a Pi.
1987	"Pani Ježková"	Compositions written by Karel Svoboda along with Peteraj for the STV's miniseries Pa a Pi.
1992	"Tichá noc" (with Peter Dvorský)	A christmas carol performed live on the VA concert Úsmev ako dar, featuring piano by Marián Lapšanský. Broadcast by STV.

Notes

- I While authors of her Czech biography from 2008 credited "Náhodou" to be written by Ivan Horváth and Alojz Čobej, according to the Oskar Lehotský study the song was composed by his namesake Ján Lehotský.

== Videos ==
=== Video albums ===
Year	Video album details	Notes
1987	Ateliér duše: Label: Videofilm SFT Koliba; Format: VHS	A collection of thirteen music videos, chronicling the Adresa ja, adresa ty Tour, plus an edited version of a TV portrait of the same name from 1986.

=== Music videos ===
Year	Song	Director	Album
1976	"Túto pieseň spievam vám"	—	non-album song
1976	"Lúčenie"	—	non-album song
1976	"Ty vieš, mama"	—	non-album song
1976	"Veľký sen mora" (with Modus)	Karol Strážnický	non-album song
1976	"Záhadná" (with Modus and Miroslav Žbirka)	Ján Roháč	non-album song
1977	"Zažni"^{[J]} (with Modus and Miroslav Žbirka)	Ján Roháč	non-album song
1978	"Letná pieseň"	—	Diskotéka OPUSu 2
1978	"S tou nádejou choď spať" (with Ján Lehotský)	Roháč	non-album song
1980	"Vyznanie"	—	Dievča do dažďa
1980	"Neprichádzaš" (with Ján Lehotský)	Jozef Novan	Balíček snov
1980	"V slepých uličkách" (with Miroslav Žbirka)	—	Doktor Sen
1982	"Tridsať stupňov v tieni"	Pavol Povoda	Slnečný kalendár
1982	"Prelietavý"	Pavol Povoda	Slnečný kalendár
1982	"Tichá dohoda" (with Ján Lehotský)	Pavol Povoda	Slnečný kalendár
1982	"Územie zázrakov"	Ervín Očenáš	Slnečný kalendár
1982	"Deň veľkých nádejí"	—	Slnečný kalendár
1983	"Muž Nula"	Jozef Kaiser	Mince na dne fontán
1983	"Školská lavica"	Jozef Kaiser	Mince na dne fontán
1984	"Zem menom láska"	Jozef Kaiser	№5
1985	"Zem menom láska" (Live)	Juraj Lihosit	№5
1985	"Crazy" (Live)	Juraj Lihosit	№5
1985	"Príbeh obrazovky" (Live)	Juraj Lihosit	№5
1985	"Vernisáž" (Live)	Juraj Lihosit	№5
1985	"Správne dievčatá" (Live)	Juraj Lihosit	Voľné miesto v srdci
1985	"Adresa ja, adresa ty" (Live)	Juraj Lihosit	Voľné miesto v srdci
1985	"Správne dievčatá"	Juraj Takáč	Voľné miesto v srdci
1986	"Prípad pre rodičov"	Kaiser	Voľné miesto v srdci
1986	"Chlapci v pasci"	Martin Valent	Voľné miesto v srdci
1986	"Voľné miesto v srdci"	Martin Valent	Voľné miesto v srdci
1986	"Konkurz na najkrajšiu dvojicu"	—	Voľné miesto v srdci
1986	"Koncert našej lásky" (with Róbert Grigorov)	Ľubomír Kocka	non-album song
1987	"Nenápadná"	Kaiser	non-album song
1987	"Ateliér duše"	Ladislav Kaboš	Ateliér duše
1987	"Malá smutná baletka"	Ladislav Kaboš	Ateliér duše
1987	"Mačací flám"	Ladislav Kaboš	Ateliér duše
1987	"V období dažďa"	Ladislav Kaboš	Ateliér duše
1987	"Koloseum"	Ladislav Kaboš	Ateliér duše
1987	"Tak si so mnou opakuj"	Ladislav Kaboš	Ateliér duše
1987	"Cirkusový kôň"	Ladislav Kaboš	Môj malý príbeh
1988	"The Carnival of Burning Dolls"	—	№5 (Export)
1990	"Babylónia"	Peter Sedlák	Kam idú ľudia?
1995	"Paradiso"	Katarína Ďurovičová	Zostaň

Notes

J Denotes a music video with featuring only her background vocals.

== See also ==
- Slovak popular music
- The 100 Greatest Slovak Albums of All Time
- List of awards and nominations received by Marika Gombitová

== Bibliography ==
- Graclík, Miroslav; Nekvapil, Václav (2008). Marika Gombitová: neautorizovaný životní příběh legendy československé pop music [Marika Gombitová: An Unauthorized Life Story of the Legend of Czechoslovak Pop Music] (in Czech). Prague, Czech Republic: XYZ. p. 446. ISBN 978-80-7388-115-3. OCLC 294939865.
- Lehotský, Oskar (April 23, 2008a). Slovak Popular Music in the Years 1977–1989 – Marika Gombitová (PDF) (in Slovak). Bratislava, Slovakia. Archived from the original (PDF) on 2014-07-14.
- Lehotský, Oskar (April 23, 2008b). Slovak Popular Music in the Years 1977–1989 – Modus (PDF) (in Slovak). Bratislava, Slovakia. Archived from the original (PDF) on 2011-08-19.
