= Miroslav Žbirka discography =

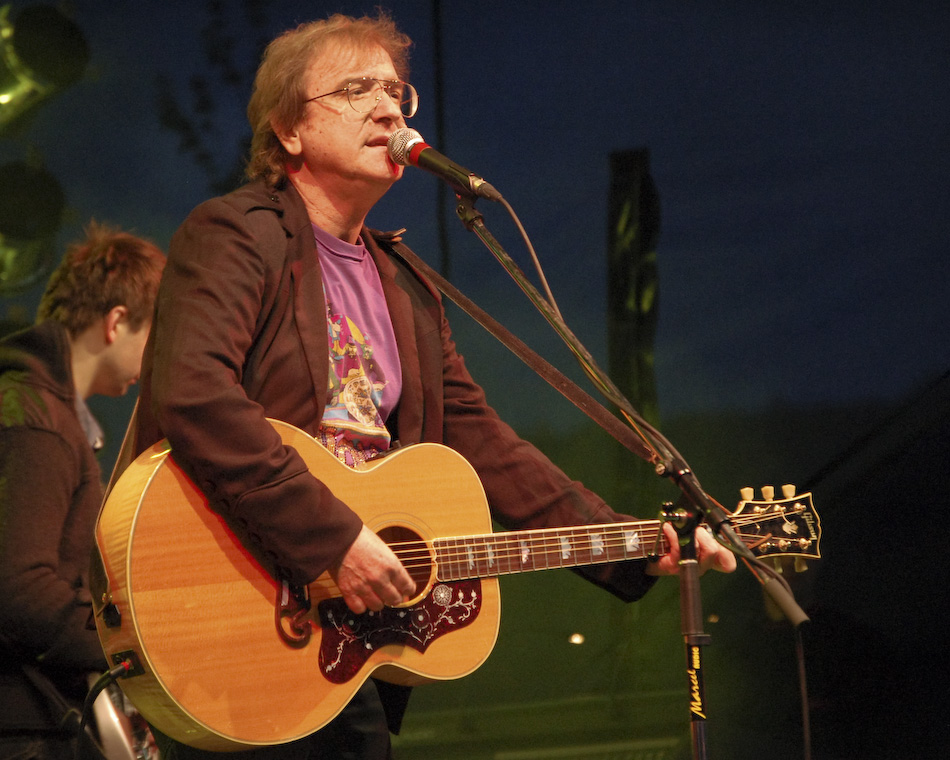
- Žbirka performing live in Czech Brno in June 2009.
- Studio albums: 16
- Extended plays: 1
- Live albums: 1
- Compilation albums: 13
- Singles: 12
- Export albums: 6

The solo discography of Slovak recording artist Miroslav Žbirka consists of fourteen studio albums, five export releases, eight compilations, one live recording, one extended play and twelve official singles. As a member of Modus, Žbirka contributed to two albums of the group, as well as a number of singles issued from 1967 until 1980.

== Albums ==
=== Studio albums ===
Year	Album	Peak positions			Certifications
Year	Album	Charts		GSA	Certifications
Year	Album	SK	CZ	GSA	Certifications
1980	Doktor Sen: Label: OPUS (#9116 1000); Format: LP, CS			19	—N/a
1982	Sezónne lásky: Label: OPUS (#9113 1258); Format: LP, CS			—	—N/a
1983	Roky a dni: Label: OPUS (#9113 1447); Format: LP, CS			—	—N/a
1984	Nemoderný chalan: Label: OPUS (#9113 1608); Format: LP, CS			—	—N/a
1986	Chlapec z ulice: Label: OPUS (#9113 1730); Format: LP, CS			—	—N/a
1988	Zlomky poznania: Label: OPUS (#9313 2048); Format: LP, CS			—	—N/a
1990	K.O.: Label: OPUS (#91 2313–1331); Format: LP, CD			—	—N/a
1993	Songs for Children: Label: Popron (#067 206); Format: CD			—	—N/a
1994	Samozrejmý svet: Label: Popron (#54 046); Format: CD			—	—N/a
1997	Meky: Label: PolyGram (#539 200); Format: CD			—	—N/a
1999	Songs for Boys & Girls: Label: Bonton (#); Format: CD			—	—N/a
2001	Modrý album: Label: Universal (#013 754); Format: CD		11	86	—N/a
2005	Dúhy: Label: Universal (#987 373–5); Format: CD, DVD		12	—	—N/a
2009	Empatia: Label: Universal (#); Format: CD		2	—	—N/a
with Modus
1979	Modus: Label: OPUS (#9116 0856); Format: LP, CS			41	—N/a
1980	Balíček snov: Label: OPUS (#9116 0999); Format: LP, CS			—	—N/a
"—" denotes an album that did not chart or was not released in that region.

=== Compilations ===
Year	Album	Peak positions		Certifications
Year	Album	Charts		Certifications
Year	Album	SK	CZ	Certifications
1985	12 naj: Label: OPUS (#9113 1598); Format: LP, CS			—N/a
1992	20 naj: Label: OPUS (#91 2346); Format:			—N/a
1995	22 dní: The Best Of: Label: Popron (#}; Format: CD			—N/a
1999	The Best Of 2: Label: Bonton (#494 193); Format: CD			—N/a
2003	The Best of 93–03: Label: Universal (#}; Format:			—N/a
2006	Gold: Label: OPUS (#91 2700); Format: CD		27	—N/a
2007	22x2: The Best Of: Label: Universal (#174 813); Format: 2CD		8	—N/a
2011	Symphonic Album: Label: Universal (#}; Format: CD		2	Platinum
with Modus
1987	Zrkadlo rokov: Label: OPUS (#9113 1867); Format: LP, CS			—N/a
1995	The Best of 1977-1988: Vol 1: Label: Open Music (#033 2312); Format: 2CD, 2CS			—N/a
1998	The Best of 1979-1988: Vol 2: Label: Open Music (#064 2312); Format: 2CD			—N/a
1998	Úsmev: Label: Bonton (#491 722); Format: CD			—N/a
2005	Gold: Label: OPUS (#91 2708); Format: CD			—N/a
"—" denotes an album that did not chart or was not released in that region.

=== Live albums ===
Year	Album
2004	Live: Label: Universal (#986 841–7); Format: CD

=== Export albums ===
Year	Album
1981	Doctor Dream: Label: OPUS (#9113 1148); Format: LP, CS
1982	Light of My Life: Label: OPUS (#9113 1344); Format: LP, CS
1983	Giant Step (aka Dear Boy, 1984): Label: OPUS (#9113 1556); Format: LP, CS
1989	Step by Step: Label: OPUS (#9313 2126); Format: LP
2008	Like a Hero: The Best of Miro: Label: Universal (#); Format: CD
with Modus
1980	Modus: Label: OPUS (#9113 0974); Format: LP, CS

=== Extended plays ===
Year	Song	Charts				Notes
Year	Song	SK		CZ		Notes
Year	Song	50	100	50	100	Notes
2008	"Vieš byť zlá": Label: Universal (#179 053)	4	11	10	49	4 track EP featuring also "Mám ťa viac", "Náladový Song" with Martha & Laco Deczi, and "Je mi fajn" with Bradley Stratton.

=== Singles ===
==== As lead artist ====
Year	Song	Album
1980	"Klaun z domu číslo 6"	Doktor Sen
1982	"The Love Song"	Doctor Dream (aka Miro)
1983	"Biely kvet"	Sezónne lásky
1983	"Nechodí"	Roky a dni
1983	"Ginny"	Giant Step (aka Dear Boy)
1983	"Dear Boy"	Giant Step (aka Dear Boy)
1986	"Katka"	Chlapec z ulice
1987	"Sunshine Lady"	
1994	"Zima, Zima"	Samozrejmý svet
1997	"Letím tmou"	Meky
2009	"Múr našich lások (Live)"	
2009	"Like a Hero"	Like a Hero: The Best of Miro
2024	"Perfektná"	

==== Other charted songs ====
Year	Song	Charts				Album
Year	Song	SK		CZ		Album
Year	Song	50	100	50	100	Album
Airplay singles
2006	"Někdy stačí dát jen dech" with Iva Frühlingová ^{[A]}	—	—	8	37	Dúhy
2006	"Kráľovná rannej krásy"	16	38	8	57	Dúhy
2006	"Láskoliek"	—	—	15	65	Dúhy
2006	"Mám ťa viac"	4	11	—	—	
2006	"Domino"	47	—	—	—	Dúhy
2007	"Dúhy"	—	—	—	53	Dúhy
2007	"Tajnosľubná" with Marika Gombitová	—	—	35	—	Dúhy
2007	"Náladový song" with Martha feat. Laco Deczi	—	—	22	72	
2007	"Tento svet je môj" with Iva Frühlingová	14	47	—	—	
2007	"Daj mi"	11	28	27	—	22x2: The Best Of
2009	"22 dní (Robert Burian Remix)"	13	27	—	—	
2009	"Tento song" with Magdaléna Šalamounová	5	13	2	18	Empatia
2009	"Strom"	11	27	—	57	Empatia
2010	"Empatia"	42	—	—	—	Empatia
2010	"Tadam dám si dám" with Martha	10	67	—	—	
2011	"Naj"	21	92	5	31	Empatia
2011	"Jesenná láska"	37	—	7	26	Symphonic Album
"—" denotes a single that did not chart or was not released in that region.

Notes

- A The song also reached at number #23 on the Czech Mobile Music Chart.
