= The Best of 1979–1988: Vol 2 =

Compilation album by Modus
- Released: 1998
- Genre: Big beat; pop
- Length: 72:10 (Disc 1); 73:32 (Disc 2)
- Label: Open (#0064 2312)
- Producer: Ján Lauko

Modus chronology
The Best of 1977–1988: Vol 1 (1995)	The Best of 1979–1988: Vol 2 (1998)	Úsmev (1998)

The Best of 1979–1988: Vol 2 is the third compilation, and the second double set of greatest hits by Modus, released on Open Music in 1998.

== Track listing ==
All tracks are written by Lehotský and Peteraj, except for the tracks 2 and 6 (Lehotský and Filan).

One
No.	Title	Featured artist(s)	Length
1.	"Modus" (taken from Modus)	Ján Lehotský, Miroslav Žbirka and Marika Gombitová	2:47
2.	"Prázdny rám" (taken from Modus)	Lehotský	4:59
3.	"Pripútaná" (taken from Modus)	Gombitová	4:58
4.	"Vieš byť zlá" (taken from Modus)	Žbirka	4:17
5.	"Slávnosť kvetín" (taken from Modus)	Gombitová	3:39
6.	"Ja a ty" (taken from Balíček snov)	Lehotský	4:36
7.	"Pacient" (taken from Balíček snov)	Lehotský	5:20
8.	"Ruleta" (taken from Balíček snov)	Gombitová	3:06
9.	"Báječní muži na lietajúcich strojoch" (taken from Balíček snov)	Gombitová	3:23
10.	"Naposledy" (taken from Balíček snov)	Lehotský	3:39
11.	"Dotyk" (taken from 99 zápaliek)	Gombitová	5:10
12.	"Zmrzlinár s bielou čapicou" (taken from 99 zápaliek)	Lehotský	3:54
13.	"Zimný park" (taken from 99 zápaliek)	Lehotský and Gombitová	3:39
14.	"Keď nastúpia veteráni" (taken from Záhradná kaviareň)	Lehotský	2:12
15.	"Záhradná kaviareň" (taken from Záhradná kaviareň)	Gombitová	3:53
16.	"Sťahovák" (taken from Záhradná kaviareň)	Lehotský	4:05
17.	"Haliere" (taken from Záhradná kaviareň)	Lehotský and Gombitová	4:45
18.	"Medové srdce" (taken from Záhradná kaviareň)	Lehotský	3:48
Total length:			72:10

Two
No.	Title	Featured artist(s)	Length
19.	"Inferno" (taken from 99 zápaliek)	Ján Hangoni	3:34
20.	"Opustená loď" (taken from Najlepšie dievčatá)	Lehotský	3:37
21.	"Predajňa strateného času" (taken from Najlepšie dievčatá)	Lehotský and Marián Greksa	4:11
22.	"Hudobníčka" (taken from Najlepšie dievčatá)	Lehotský and Ľuboš Stankovský	4:16
23.	"Má iba 16 a 1 deň" (taken from Každý niečo hrá)	Milan Vyskočáni	4:08
24.	"Cirkusanti" (taken from Každý niečo hrá)	Lehotský and Stankovský	4:20
25.	"Tichá voda" (taken from Každý niečo hrá)	Greksa	3:14
26.	"Slepé balady" (taken from Každý niečo hrá)	Greksa and Stankovský	3:57
27.	"Klubový lev" (taken from Každý niečo hrá)	Lehotský and Greksa	4:20
28.	"Lepšie je žiť" (taken from Vlaky s rokmi)	Lehotský and Ivona Novotná	3:47
29.	"Skrotený" (taken from Vlaky s rokmi)	Lehotský	4:44
30.	"Kniha tajných želaní" (taken from Vlaky s rokmi)	Lehotský and Novotná	3:59
31.	"Vlaky s rokmi" (taken from Vlaky s rokmi)	Lehotský and Novotná	3:36
32.	"Kamarátka do prehraných polčasov" (taken from Keď sa raz oči dohodnú)	Lehotský	3:40
33.	"Smútok sobotňajších internátov" (taken from Keď sa raz oči dohodnú)	Jozef Paulíny	3:44
34.	"Stereo podraz" (taken from Keď sa raz oči dohodnú)	Lehotský	5:25
35.	"Deň slávy s príchuťou prachov" (taken from Keď sa raz oči dohodnú)	Paulíny	5:11
36.	"Spakovaný muž" (taken from Keď sa raz oči dohodnú)	Paulíny	3:57
Total length:			73:32

== Official releases ==
- 1998: Modus, 2CD, Open, #0064 2312

== Credits and personnel ==
- Ján Lehotský – lead vocal, writer, keyboards
- Marika Gombitová – lead vocal, back vocal
- Miroslav Žbirka – lead vocal, chorus, electric and acoustic guitar
- Kamil Peteraj – lyrics
- Boris Filan – lyrics
- Ján Lauko – producer
- Ján Hangoni – lead vocal
- Marián Greksa – lead vocal
- Ľuboš Stankovský – lead vocal
- Milan Vyskočáni
- Ivona Novotná – lead vocal
- Jozef Paulíny – lead vocal
