= The Best of the Best =

Compilation album by Marika Gombitová
- Released: 1998
- Recorded: 1979–90
- Genre: Beat; pop rock
- Length: 76:10 (Disc 1); 78:18 (Disc 2)
- Label: Open Music (#0065 2312)
- Producer: Ján Lauko; Milan Vašica; Peter Breiner; Peter Smolinský

Marika Gombitová chronology
The Best of 1979–1988: Vol 2 (1998)	The Best of the Best (1998)	Úsmev (1998)

The Best of the Best is the third compilation album by Slovak singer-songwriter Marika Gombitová and her first featuring two compact discs, released on OPUS in 1998.

== Track listing ==
All tracks are written by Gombitová and Peteraj, unless stated otherwise.

One
No.	Title	Writer(s)	Length
1.	"V období dažďa" (taken from Ateliér duše)		3:19
2.	"Mačací flám" (taken from Ateliér duše)	Patejdl; Peteraj	3:41
3.	"Prázdninové tričko" (taken from №5)		3:06
4.	"Prekážky dní" (taken from №5)		3:11
5.	"Cena priateľov" (taken from Mince na dne fontán)		3:41
6.	"Dvaja" (taken from Kam idú ľudia?)	Šeban; Peteraj	3:39
7.	"Babylónia" (taken from Kam idú ľudia?)		5:15
8.	"Zámená" (taken from Ateliér duše)	Patejdl; Peteraj	3:16
9.	"Štúdie žien" (taken from Ateliér duše)		3:11
10.	"Máš v rukáve máj" (taken from Slnečný kalendár)	Lehotský; Peteraj	2:25
11.	"Výpredaj" (taken from Dievča do dažďa)	Hammel; Peteraj	3:25
12.	"Napíš" (taken from Dievča do dažďa)	Hammel; Peteraj	2:45
13.	"Môj brat strom" (taken from Mince na dne fontán)		2:40
14.	"Skúška prvých šiat" (taken from Mince na dne fontán)		3:30
15.	"Zelenáč máj" (taken from Mince na dne fontán)	Lehotský; Peteraj	4:43
16.	"Cena pokladov" (taken from Mince na dne fontán)	Lehotský; Peteraj	5:30
17.	"Slnečný kalendár" (taken from Slnečný kalendár)		2:43
18.	"Rád si menil popol na hviezdy" (taken from Kam idú ľudia?)		4:20
19.	"Beh do slnka" (taken from Mince na dne fontán)		4:38
20.	"Kam idú ľudia?" (dedicated to Stevie Wonder, taken from Kam idú ľudia?)		6:07
Total length:			76:10

Two
No.	Title	Writer(s)	Length
21.	"Dievča s krásnou tvárou" (taken from Mince na dne fontán)	Lehotský; Peteraj	4:29
22.	"Vyznanie" (taken from Dievča do dažďa)	Lehotský; Peteraj	4:43
23.	"Koloseum" (taken from Ateliér duše)		4:20
24.	"Neznámy pár" (duet with Karel Gott, taken from Ateliér duše)		4:10
25.	"Kríž" (taken from Kam idú ľudia?)	Šeban; Peteraj	4:53
26.	"Cirkusový kôň" (taken from Môj malý príbeh)	Lauko; Peteraj	4:52
27.	"Pieseň na tisíc a jednu noc" (taken from Môj malý príbeh)	Hammel; Peteraj	3:14
28.	"Ateliér duše" (taken from Ateliér duše)	Patejdl; Peteraj	3:51
29.	"Zem menom láska" (taken from №5)		3:20
30.	"Malá smutná baletka" (taken from Ateliér duše)	Patejdl; Peteraj	4:42
31.	"Keď svitá pod srdcom žien" (taken from Mince na dne fontán)		7:10
32.	"Deti z domovov" (taken from Mince na dne fontán)		5:25
33.	"Cukráreň na dlani námestia" (taken from Slnečný kalendár)	Lauko; Peteraj	4:45
34.	"Územie zázrakov" (taken from Slnečný kalendár)		3:35
35.	"Rozhovor s neznámou" (taken from Slnečný kalendár)	Lauko; Peteraj	4:54
36.	"Deň veľkých nádejí" (taken from Slnečný kalendár)	Lehotský; Peteraj	4:04
37.	"Epilóg" (taken from Dievča do dažďa)	Lehotský; Peteraj	3:47
Total length:			78:18

== Official releases ==
- 1998: The Best of the Best, 2CD, Open Music #0065 2312

== Credits and personnel ==
- Marika Gombitová - lead vocal, writer
- Václav Patejdl - music
- Ján Lehotský - music
- Ján Lauko - music, producer
- Pavol Hammel - music
- Andrej Šeban - music
- Kamil Peteraj - lyrics
- Karel Gott - lead vocal
- Milan Vašica - producer
- Peter Breiner - producer
- Peter Smolinský - producer
- Július Kinček - notes
