= Zrkadlo rokov =

Compilation album by Modus
- Released: 1987
- Recorded: 1970–84
- Genre: Big beat; pop
- Length: 43:04
- Label: OPUS (#9113 1867)
- Producer: Ján Lauko

Modus chronology
Vlaky s rokmi (1986)	Zrkadlo rokov (1987)	Keď sa raz oči dohodnú (1988)

Zrkadlo rokov is the first compilation by the Modus band, released on OPUS Records in 1987.

== Track listing ==
All tracks are written by Lehotský and Peteraj, except for the track 1 (Lehotský and Filan).

No.	Title	Featured artist(s)	Length
1.	"Veľký sen mora"	Ján Lehotský	4:51
2.	"Dievčatá" (taken from OPUS '78)	Miroslav Žbirka	2:23
3.	"Skús za mnou prísť"
4.	"Cesta so psom"		3:42
5.	"Keď zametú" (taken from Môj malý príbeh)	Lehotský and Marika Gombitová	4:12
6.	"Nevolaj viac" (taken from SP "Cesta so psom")		4:11
7.	"Zrkadlo rokov" (taken from Záhradná kaviareň)	Lehotský	4:13
8.	"Ty, ja a môj brat" (taken from Najlepšie dievčatá)	Ľuboš Stankovský	4:02
9.	"Vieš byť zlá" (taken from Modus)	Žbirka	4:17
10.	"Pozhasínané" (taken from 99 zápaliek)	Lehotský and Karol Morvay	4:15
11.	"Úsmev" (taken from OPUS '77)	Lehotský, Žbirka, Gombitová and Miroslav Jevčák	3:29
12.	"Spoluhráčka" (taken from 99 zápaliek)	Lehotský	3:25
Total length:			43:04

== Official releases ==
- 1987: Zrkadlo rokov, LP, MC, OPUS, #9113 1867

== Credits and personnel ==
- Ján Lehotský – lead vocal, writer, keyboards
- Marika Gombitová – lead vocal, back vocal
- Miroslav Žbirka – lead vocal, chorus, guitar
- Ľuboš Stankovský – lead vocal
- Karol Morvay – lead vocal
- Miroslav Jevčák – lead vocal
- Kamil Peteraj – lyrics
- Boris Filan – lyrics
- Ján Lauko – producer
