= The Best of 1977–1988: Vol 1 =

Compilation album by Modus
- Released: 1995
- Recorded: 1977–88
- Genre: Big beat; pop
- Length: 70:29 (Disc 1); 71:21 (Disc 2)
- Label: Open (#0033 2312)

Modus chronology
Keď sa raz oči dohodnú (1988)	The Best of 1977–1988: Vol 1 (1995)	The Best of 1979–1988: Vol 2 (1998)

Back cover

The Best of 1977–1988: Vol 1 is the second compilation and the first double set of greatest hits by Modus, released on Open Music in 1995.

== Track listing ==
All tracks are written by Lehotský and Peteraj, except for the tracks 3 (Lehotský and Karšay), 4 (Lehotský and Filan), 5 (Lehotský and Zeman) and 12 (Lehotský).

One
No.	Title	Featured artist(s)	Length
1.	"Zrkadlo rokov" (taken from Záhradná kaviareň)	Ján Lehotský	4:16
2.	"Dievčatá" (taken from OPUS '78)	Miroslav Žbirka	2:24
3.	"Sen o tebe" (taken from SP "Formula 1")	Lehotský and Ľudovít Nosko	4:01
4.	"Veľký sen mora"	Lehotský	4:37
5.	"Formula 1"	Nosko	3:28
6.	"Úsmev" (taken from OPUS '77)	Lehotský, Žbirka, Marika Gombitová and Miroslav Jevčák	3:29
7.	"Balíček snov" (taken from Balíček snov)	Lehotský and Gombitová	5:19
8.	"Mágovo číslo" (taken from Balíček snov)	Lehotský	4:13
9.	"Blúdim" (taken from Balíček snov)	Gombitová	3:30
10.	"Lásky idú" (taken from Balíček snov)	Lehotský	3:52
11.	"Neprichádzaš" (taken from Balíček snov)	Lehotský and Gombitová	4:42
12.	"Stratený sen" (taken from Balíček snov)	Žbirka	3:36
13.	"99 zápaliek" (taken from 99 zápaliek)	Lehotský	3:36
14.	"Stará kára" (taken from 99 zápaliek)	Lehotský	3:33
15.	"Spoluhráčka" (taken from 99 zápaliek)	Lehotský	3:25
16.	"Čierny drozd" (taken from 99 zápaliek)	Lehotský	4:19
17.	"Stanica srdce" (taken from 99 zápaliek)	Lehotský	3:54
18.	"Pozhasínané" (taken from 99 zápaliek)	Lehotský and Karol Morvay	4:15
Total length:			70:29

Two
No.	Title	Featured artist(s)	Length
19.	"Tajomstvo hier" (taken from Záhradná kaviareň)	Lehotský and Gombitová	4:43
20.	"Sveták" (taken from Záhradná kaviareň)	Lehotský	4:39
21.	"Spomínanie" (taken from Záhradná kaviareň)	Lehotský	4:40
22.	"Otec a syn" (taken from Najlepšie dievčatá)	Lehotský and Ľuboš Stankovský	4:58
23.	"Ty, ja a môj brat" (taken from Najlepšie dievčatá)	Stankovský	4:02
24.	"Kamoš z dvora" (taken from Najlepšie dievčatá)	Lehotský	4:23
25.	"Z pleca na plece" (taken from Najlepšie dievčatá)	Marián Greksa	2:51
26.	"Najlepšie dievčatá" (taken from Najlepšie dievčatá)	Greksa	3:14
27.	"Domov kráča trieda" (taken from Každý niečo hrá)	Lehotský	3:39
28.	"Kapely starnú" (taken from Vlaky s rokmi)	Lehotský and Pavol Hammel	3:27
29.	"Karty sú už rozdané" (taken from Vlaky s rokmi)	Lehotský and Ivona Novotná	4:19
30.	"Keď vrelo véčko" (taken from Vlaky s rokmi)	Lehotský, Hammel a Peter Lipa	3:43
31.	"Hop, hop malí žiaci" (taken from Vlaky s rokmi)	Lehotský and Novotná	3:43
32.	"Keď sa raz oči dohodnú" (taken from Keď sa raz oči dohodnú)	Novotná and Jozef Paulíny	4:02
33.	"Roberta" (taken from Keď sa raz oči dohodnú)	Paulíny	4:22
34.	"Snívaj, lietaj, bež a skáč" (taken from Keď sa raz oči dohodnú)	Lehotský, Novotná and Paulíny	3:50
35.	"Skús" (taken from Keď sa raz oči dohodnú)	Novotná and Paulíny	3:42
36.	"Šesť minút" (taken from Keď sa raz oči dohodnú)	Paulíny	3:06
Total length:			71:21

== Official releases ==
- 1995: Modus, 2CD, 2MC, Open Music, #0033 2312

== Credits and personnel ==
- Ján Lehotský – lead vocal, writer, keyboards
- Marika Gombitová – lead vocal, back vocal
- Miroslav Žbirka – writer, lead vocal, chorus, electric and acoustic guitar
- Ľudovít Nosko – lead vocal
- Miro Jevčák – lead vocal
- Karol Morvay – lead vocal
- Ľuboš Stankovský – lead vocal
- Marián Greksa – lead vocal
- Pavol Hammel – lead vocal
- Ivona Novotná – lead vocal
- Peter Lipa – lead vocal
- Jozef Paulíny – lead vocal
- Kamil Peteraj – lyrics
- Alexander Karšay – lyrics
- Boris Filan – lyrics
- Ľuboš Zeman – lyrics
- Juraj Štubniak – remastering
- Juraj Lehotský – photography, design
- Lukáš Minárik – design
