= Slnečný kalendár =

Studio album by Marika Gombitová
- Released: 1982
- Recorded: 1982
- Genre: Big beat; pop
- Length: 40:15
- Label: OPUS (#9113 1259)
- Producer: Ján Lauko

Marika Gombitová chronology
99 zápaliek (1981)	Slnečný kalendár (1982)	Záhradná kaviareň (1983)

Singles from Môj malý príbeh
- 1. "Srdcia dievčat"/"Slnečný kalendár"

Slnečný kalendár (English: Sunny Calendar) is the third solo album by Slovak recording artist Marika Gombitová released on OPUS in 1982.

== Track listing ==
All tracks are written by Lehotský and Peteraj, unless stated otherwise

No.	Title	Writer(s)	Length
1.	"Máš v rukáve máj"		2:25
2.	"Cukráreň na dlani námestia"	Lauko; Peteraj	4:45
3.	"Srdcia dievčat"	Lauko; Peteraj	4:03
4.	"Rozhovor s neznámou"	Lauko; Peteraj	4:54
5.	"Tichá dohoda" (duet with Ján Lehotský)		4:52
6.	"Prelietavý"		5:28
7.	"Územie zázrakov"	Gombitová; Peteraj	3:35
8.	"Tridsať stupňov v tieni"		3:26
9.	"Slnečný kalendár"	Gombitová; Peteraj	2:43
10.	"Deň veľkých nádejí"		4:04
Total length:			40:15

Slnečný kalendár: Komplet 3 (Bonus Tracks)
No.	Title	Writer(s)	Length
11.	"Zimná pieseň" (taken from Diskotéka OPUSu 2)	Brezovský; Peteraj	3:27
12.	"Letná pieseň" (taken from Diskotéka OPUSu 2)	Kolenič; Zeman	3:01
13.	"Prstienky z trávy" (taken from Diskotéka OPUSu 3)	Gombitová; Guldan	3:20
14.	"Ružový smútok" (taken from Diskotéka OPUSu 4)	Lauko; Okoličány	2:55
Total length:			52:58

Slnečný kalendár: Collectors Edition (Bonus CD)
No.	Title	Featured artist(s)	Length
11.	"Modus" (taken from Modus)	Ján Lehotský and Miroslav Žbirka	2:47
12.	"Slávnosť kvetín" (taken from Modus)		3:39
13.	"Jedenásť poschodí" (taken from Modus)		3:15
14.	"Pripútaná" (taken from Modus)		4:58
15.	"Domy na zbúranie" (taken from Modus)		5:27
16.	"Balíček snov" (taken from Balíček snov)	Lehotský	5:20
17.	"Neprichádzaš" (taken from Balíček snov)	Lehotský	4:47
18.	"Báječní muži na lietajúcich strojoch" (taken from Balíček snov)		3:23
19.	"Blúdim" (taken from Balíček snov)		3:32
20.	"Dotyk" (taken from 99 zápaliek)		5:10
21.	"Zimný park" (taken from 99 zápaliek)	Lehotský	3:09
22.	"Záhradná kaviareň" (taken from Záhradná kaviareň)		4:00
23.	"Tajomstvo hier" (taken from Záhradná kaviareň)	Lehotský	4:40
24.	"Haliere" (taken from Záhradná kaviareň)	Lehotský	4:53
25.	"Rock Is Not Dead" (taken from Modus)	Lehotský and Žbirka	2:47
26.	"My Train to Eden" (taken from Modus)		3:39
27.	"Take Me to the Moonlight" (taken from Modus)		3:15
28.	"You Went Away" (taken from Modus)		4:58
29.	"Lonely Night" (taken from Modus)		5:27
Total length:			79:07

== Official releases ==
- 1982: Slnečný kalendár, LP, MC, OPUS, #9113 1259
- 1995: Slnečný kalendár, CD, re-release, Open Music #0026 2331
- 2002: Slnečný kalendár: Komplet 3, 4 bonus tracks, CD, Sony Music/Bonton, #50 7832
- 2004: Slnečný kalendár: Komplet 3, 4 bonus tracks, CD, OPUS, #91 1259
- 2008: Slnečný kalendár: 2CD Collectors Edition, bonus CD, OPUS, #91 2792

== Credits and personnel ==
- Marika Gombitová - lead vocal
- Ján Lehotský - lead vocal, chorus, keyboards, writer
- Anastasios Engonidis - bass, chorus
- Ján Hangoni - solo guitar, chorus
- Karol Morvay - drum, chorus
- Ján Lauko - acoustic piano, vocoder, writer, producer
- Kamil Peteraj - lyrics
- Jozef Hanák - sound direction
- Karol Kállay - photography
- Ali Brezovský - writer (bonus track 11, Komplet 3)
- Vlado Kolenič - writer (bonus track 12, Komplet 3)
- Ľuboš Zeman - writer (bonus track 12, Komplet 3)
- Peter Guldan - writer (bonus track 13, Komplet 3)
- J. Okoličány - writer (bonus track 14, Komplet 3)

== Accolades ==
In 2007, Slnečný kalendár placed at number 49 on the Nový čas list of the 100 Greatest Slovak Albums of All Time.
