= Gold (Modus album) =

Compilation album by Modus
- Released: 2005
- Recorded: 1977–1988
- Genre: Big beat; pop
- Length: 57:52
- Label: OPUS (#91 2708)

Modus chronology
Úsmev (1998)	Gold (2005)

Gold is the fifth compilation by the Modus band, released on OPUS Records in 2005.

== Track listing ==
All tracks are written by Lehotský and Peteraj, except for the tracks 14 and 15 (Lehotský and Filan)

No.	Title	Featured artist(s)	Length
1.	"Úsmev" (taken from OPUS '77)	Ján Lehotský, Miroslav Žbirka, Marika Gombitová and Miroslav Jevčák	3:29
2.	"Dievčatá" (taken from OPUS '78)	Žbirka	2:23
3.	"Malý veľký vlak" (taken from Modus)	Žbirka	3:39
4.	"Stará kára" (taken from 99 zápaliek)	Lehotský	3:33
5.	"Pozhasínané" (taken from 99 zápaliek)	Lehotský and Karol Morvay	4:15
6.	"Spoluhráčka" (taken from 99 zápaliek)	Lehotský	3:25
7.	"Róberta" (taken from Keď sa raz oči dohodnú)	Jozef Paulíny	4:22
8.	"Mágovo číslo" (taken from Balíček snov)	Lehotský	4:18
9.	"Karty sú už rozdané" (taken from Vlaky s rokmi)	Lehotský and Ivona Novotná	4:19
10.	"Ty, ja a môj brat" (taken from Najlepšie dievčatá)	Ľuboš Stankovský	4:02
11.	"Keď sa raz oči dohodnú" (taken from Keď sa raz oči dohodnú)	Novotná and Paulíny	4:02
12.	"Kapely starnú" (taken from Vlaky s rokmi)	Lehotský and Pavol Hammel	3:27
13.	"Naposledy" (taken from Balíček snov)	Lehotský	3:39
14.	"Sladký hlas" (taken from Modus)	Lehotský	3:46
15.	"Veľký sen mora"	Lehotský	4:51
Total length:			57:52

== Official releases ==
- 2005: Gold, CD, OPUS, No. 91 2708

== Credits and personnel ==
- Ján Lehotský – lead vocal, writer, keyboards
- Marika Gombitová – lead vocal, back vocal
- Miroslav Žbirka – lead vocal, chorus, guitar
- Kamil Peteraj – lyrics
- Boris Filan – lyrics
- Miroslav Jevčák – lead vocal
- Karol Morvay – lead vocal
- Jozef Paulíny – lead vocal
- Ivona Novotná – lead vocal
- Ľuboš Stankovský – lead vocal
- Pavol Hammel – lead vocal
- Ján Červenka – mastering
- Tibor Borský – photo

== See also ==
- The 100 Greatest Slovak Albums of All Time
