= Good Vibes: Remixes =

Remix album by Double L & Vinyl Culture
- Released: Fall 1997
- Recorded: 1997
- Genre: Dance-pop
- Label: PolyGram Slovakia (#539 531)

Ladislav Lučenič chronology
Svetlo (...a pocit bezpečia) (1996)	Good Vibes: Remixes (1997)	Proudy: Tribute to Prúdy (2000)

Marika Gombitová chronology
The Best of 1977–1988: Vol 1 (1995)	Good Vibes: Remixes (1997)	The Best of 1979–1988: Vol 2 (1998)

Alternative cover
- Back cover of the release

Good Vibes: Remixes is a Ladislav Lučenič (also known as Double L) project that featured fourteen compositions by major Slovak artists, such as Marika Gombitová ("Domy na zbúranie", "V období dažďa"), Elán ("Poďme sa báť"), Pavol Habera and TEAM ("Som v tom", "Výsluch svedomia") and Prúdy ("Poď so mnou"). The set was released on PolyGram Slovakia in 1997.

For the production of the album, Lučenič received the ZAI Award '97 as the Best Producer His additional productions included "Klik-klak" by I.M.T. Smile, and "Tomorrow"/The Same Mist Here by Karol Mikloš.

== Track listing ==
No.	Title	Writer(s)	Performer	Length
1.	"Good Vibes: Classy (Original Mix)"	Lučenič	Ladislav Lučenič	4:12
2.	"Som v tom (Soft Remix)"	Antalík; Jursa	TEAM	4:10
3.	"Domy na zbúranie (Vital Remix)"	Lehotský; Peteraj	Modus and Marika Gombitová	4:30
4.	"Jungle Song (Radio Edit)"	Maiga	Ibrahim Maiga	3:33
5.	"V období dažďa (Drumatic Remix)"	Gombitová; Peteraj	Gombitová	3:45
6.	"Poď so mnou (Orig. Flowery-Powery Remix)"	Varga; Skukálek	Prúdy	3:43
7.	"Malá horká čokoláda (Swingin' Radio Edit)"	Patejdl	Beáta Dubasová	4:00
8.	"Poďme sa báť (Phat Remix)"	Patejdl; Filan	Elán	4:13
9.	"Výsluch svedomia (Rough Power Mix)"	Habera; Uličný	Pavol Habera	4:24

Bonus Tracks
No.	Title	Writer(s)	Performer	Length
10.	"Za dverami mojej izby (Hothouse Remix)"	Patejdl; Spiiak	Dubasová	4:32
11.	"Som v tom (Raw Power Mix)"	Antalík; Jursa	TEAM	5:44
12.	"Poď so mnou (Revised Single Edit)"	Varga; Skukálek	Prúdy	3:39
13.	"Výsluch svedomia (Pres-Sure-Mix)"	Habera; Uličný	Pavol Habera	6:35
14.	"Poďme sa báť (Groovy Remix)"	Patejdl; Filan	Elán	3:57

== Official releases ==
- 1997: Good Vibes: Remixes, CD, PolyGram Slovakia, #539 531

== Credits and personnel ==
- Laco Lučenič - writer, remix
- TEAM - performer
- Modus - performer
- Marika Gombitová - writer, lead vocal
- Ibrahim Maiga - writer, lead vocal
- Prúdy - performer
- Beáta Dubasová - lead vocal
- Elán - performer
- Pavol Habera - writer, lead vocal
- Dušan Antalík - writer
- Ján Lehotský - writer, performer
- Marián Varga - writer
- Václav Patejdl - writer
- Pavol Jursa - lyrics
- Kamil Peteraj - lyrics
- Rudolf Skukálek - lyrics
- Boris Filan - lyrics
- Peter Uličný - lyrics

== See also ==
- Marika Gombitová discography
- Marika Gombitová awards
- The 100 Greatest Slovak Albums of All Time
