= Moje najmilšie =

Compilation album by Marika Gombitová
- Released: 1985
- Recorded: 1979–84
- Genre: Big beat; pop
- Length: 46:16
- Label: OPUS (#9113 1599)
- Producer: Ján Lauko; Milan Vašica

Marika Gombitová chronology
№5 (1984)	Moje najmilšie (1985)	Voľné miesto v srdci (1986)

Compact disc
- Front cover of the CD release

Moje najmilšie (English: My Bonniest) is the first compilation album by Marika Gombitová, released on OPUS in 1985.

== Track listing ==
All tracks are written by Lehotský and Peteraj, unless stated otherwise

No.	Title	Writer(s)	Length
1.	"Tridsať stupňov v tieni" (taken from Slnečný kalendár)		3:26
2.	"Deň letí" (taken from Môj malý príbeh)	Gombitová; Peteraj	2:40
3.	"Vyznanie" (taken from Dievča do dažďa)		4:43
4.	"Dievča s krásnou tvárou" (taken from Mince na dne fontán)		4:29
5.	"Deň veľkých nádejí" (taken from Slnečný kalendár)		4:04
6.	"Cirkusový kôň" (taken from Môj malý príbeh)	Lauko; Peteraj	4:52
7.	"Územie zázrakov" (taken from Slnečný kalendár)	Gombitová; Peteraj	3:35
8.	"Pripútaná" (taken from Modus)		4:58
9.	"Môj brat strom" (taken from Mince na dne fontán)	Gombitová; Peteraj	2:40
10.	"Smetiarsky kráľ" (taken from Mince na dne fontán)		4:04
11.	"Kúsok šťastia" (taken from Mince na dne fontán)	Gombitová; Peteraj	3:23
12.	"Na rozlúčku" (taken from Môj malý príbeh)	Gombitová; Peteraj	3:22
Total length:			46:16

== Official releases ==
- 1985: Moje najmilšie, LP, MC, OPUS, #9113 1599
- 1996: Moje najmilšie, re-release, CD, OPUS #91 2491

== Credits and personnel ==
- Marika Gombitová - lead vocal, writer
- Ján Lehotský - writer
- Ján Lauko - writer, producer
- Kamil Peteraj - lyrics
- Milan Vašica - producer
- Štefan Danko - responsible editor
- Juraj Filo - sound director
- Zuzana Mináčová - photography
