= Marika No. 5 =

1984 studio album by Marika Gombitová

Studio album by Marika Gombitová
- Released: 1984
- Recorded: 1984
- Genre: Pop; electronic
- Length: 37:34
- Label: OPUS (#9113 1562)
- Producer: Peter Breiner

Marika Gombitová chronology
Mince na dne fontán (1983)	Marika No. 5 (1984)	Moje najmilšie (1985)

Marika No. 5 is the fifth solo album by Marika Gombitová released on OPUS in 1984.

== Track listing ==
All tracks are written by Gombitová and Peteraj, unless stated otherwise.

No.	Title	Length
1.	"Prázdninové tričko"	3:06
2.	"Vernisáž"	4:46
3.	"Crazy"	4:02
4.	"Karneval horiacich bábik"	4:14
5.	"Moja planéta"	3:49
6.	"Monológ zhasnutej hviezdy"	3:15
7.	"Príbeh obrazovky"	3:32
8.	"Prekážky dní"	3:11
9.	"Korzo chlapčenských myšlienok"	3:45
10.	"Zem menom láska"	3:20
Total length:		37:34

№5: Komplet 5 (Bonus Tracks)
No.	Title	Writer(s)	Length
11.	"Báječní muži na lietajúcich strojoch" (taken from Balíček snov)	Lehotský; Peteraj	3:23
12.	"Neprichádzaš" (duet with Ján Lehotský, taken from Balíček snov)	Lehotský; Peteraj	4:47
13.	"Keď svitá pod srdcom žien" (taken from Mince na dne fontán)
Total length:			52:58

== Official releases ==
- 1984: №5, LP, OPUS, #9113 1562 (repress in 1985)
- 1984: № 5, MC, OPUS, #9913 0218
- 1996: №5, CD, OPUS, #9353 1562
- 1996: №5, CD, Open Music, #0051 2311 (re-release)
- 2004: No. 5, 3 bonus tracks, CD, OPUS, #91 1562 (Komplet 5 series)
- 2007: №5, CD, SME, #91 0014-2 (Slovenské legendárne albumy series)
- 2007: №5, Download, OPUS, #8584019156221

== Personnel ==
- Marika Gombitová – lead vocal, writer
- Peter Breiner – producer, piano, Fender Rhodes, SCI Pro-One, Roland Juno 60, Roland Vocoder, Yamaha DX7, strings conductor, arranger
- Ladislav Lučenič – bass electric guitar, Juno 60, ARP Oddysey, arranger
- Kamil Peteraj – lyrics
- Juraj Lehotský – trumpets
- Ľudovít Horský – trumpets
- Pavel Zajaček – trombone
- Tibor Mrázik – trombone
- Ľubomír Stankovský – Simmons drums
- Viliam Vaškovič programmer Roland Drums Computer TR 808,
- Ivan Minárik – keyboards, programmer ARP Oddysey, SCI Pro-One, Roland Juno 60, Roland Vocoder, sound director, technical collaboration,
- Štefan Danko – responsible editor
- Juraj Filo – sound director
- Zuzana Mináčová – photography
- Ján Lehotský – writer (bonus tracks 11–12)

== Charts ==
=== Year-end charts ===
Chart (2007)	Peak position
The 100 Greatest Slovak Albums of All Time	75

== Export release ==
№5

Studio album by Marika Gombitová
- Released: 1985
- Recorded: 1984
- Genre: Pop; electronic
- Length: 37:34
- Label: OPUS (#9113 1624)
- Producer: Peter Breiner

Marika Gombitová chronology
My Friend the Tree (1984)	№5 (1985)

The export version of the album, entitled №5, was issued in 1985.

=== Track listing ===
All tracks are written by Gombitová and Peteraj.

No.	Title	Length
1.	"The End of Summer"	3:06
2.	"The Private View"	4:46
3.	"Crazy"	4:02
4.	"The Carnival of Burning Dolls"	4:14
5.	"Memories"	3:49
6.	"The Starry Evening"	3:15
7.	"I Want to Be Free"	3:32
8.	"Your Vital Race"	3:11
9.	"Where to Go"	3:45
10.	"The Land with a Name Love"	3:20
Total length:		37:34

=== Official releases ===
- 1985: №5, LP, MC, OPUS, #9113 1624

=== Additional personnel ===
- Katarína Karovičová-Rybková – English transcription
- Miroslav Brocko – design
