= Invalid (film) =

2023 film

- Release poster
- Directed by: Jonáš Karásek
- Story by: Tomáš Dušička
- Produced by: Maroš Hečko; Peter Veverka
- Starring: Gregor Hološka; Zdeněk Godla
- Edited by: Matej Beneš
- Music by: Viktor Krivosudský
- Production company: Azyl production
- Release date: 9 February 2023
- Running time: 108 minutes
- Country: Slovakia
- Languages: Slovak, Romani, Czech
- Budget: € 1.1 million

Invalid is a Slovak dark comedy directed by Jonáš Karásek on the original screenplay by Tomáš Dušička. The film, situated in the 1990s post-Communist Slovakia, tells a story of a working-class man Lacko, who becomes disabled due to being attacked by mafia thugs. Together with a newly found friend Gabo, a Romani, he decides to take a stand against the mob.

== Plot ==
The story unfolds in a small Slovak town during the "wild 90s". The backdrop features tracksuits, colorful jackets, video rental stores, VCRs, boomboxes, and kitschy music. The characters are a grotesque bunch centered around the protagonist, Laco.

Laco, a museum caretaker with a short fuse, kicks off the film with a fit of rage, tossing his son's noisy cassette player out the window. His son, fed up, leaves home. In an attempt to make amends with his son and wife, who's tired of his outbursts, Laco gets tangled up with the mafia while trying to replace the cassette player. They rob him and leave him for dead in a ditch.

He's saved by a kind Roma man named Gabo, and they become friends. Laco, now using a wheelchair, plots revenge against the mafia. The corrupt mayor, who stole the cap of Slovak national hero Milan Rastislav Štefánik from the museum, gets involved in the scheme. The film culminates in a bloodbath at the museum, with only Laco and Gabo surviving.

The story is told in retrospect by Gabo, dressed in a Nazi uniform, during a police interrogation. He's the sole survivor found amidst the carnage at the museum.

Gabo, inspired by Švejk, has a gentle, almost naive demeanor. His rambling focuses on details the police deem irrelevant, much to the frustration of the detectives, nicknamed Dempsey and Makepeace. Gradually, the pieces of the puzzle fall into place, revealing Gabo's motive for his elaborate storytelling: to prove his friend's innocence.

== Cast ==
- Gregor Hološka – Laco Hunder
- Zdeněk Godla – Gabo
- Ivo Gogál and Daniel Fischer – detectives Kaiser and Fin
- Helena Krajčiová – Laco's wife Zdena
- Sväťo Malachovský – corrupt mayor
- Sáva Popovič – head mobster

== Soundtrack ==
The rapper Rytmus, who appears in a small role of a mob member in the movie, and the singer Igor Kmeťo of Kmetoband recorded a cover version of the 1977 hit single Úsmev by the rock band Modus to serve as the theme song of the movie.

== Box office ==
The movie premiered in Slovak cinemas on 9 February 2023. In the first two weeks, movie was seen by over 87,000 spectators, earning over €650,000. On 20 April 2023, the film premiered in Czechia to a lukewarm response, attracting only about 20,000 spectators. The movie was a hit among both Slovak and Czech Netflix audience. Overall, Invalid became the fourth best-earning movie in the history of the Slovak cinema since independence.

== Accolades ==
The movie was awarded seven Slovak Academy Sun in a Net Awards, including the "Audience Award","Best Director","Best Actor" and "Best Film".
