= Slávnosť úprimných slov =

1987 EP by Marika Gombitová, Václav Patejdl, Ján Lehotský, and Richard Müller

EP by Marika Gombitová, Václav Patejdl, Ján Lehotský, Richard Müller
- Released: 1987
- Genre: Pop
- Length: 15:41
- Label: OPUS (#9183 0305)
- Producer: Július Kinček

Marika Gombitová chronology
Ateliér duše (1987)	Slávnosť úprimných slov (1987)	Kam idú ľudia? (1990)

Slávnosť úprimných slov (English: Celebration of Sincere Words) is a five-track Slovak EP of Christmas compositions by Marika Gombitová, Václav Patejdl, Ján Lehotský, and Richard Müller. The compilation was issued on OPUS in 1987.

== Track listing ==
All tracks are written by Patejdl and Peteraj, except for track 5 (Gombitová, Patejdl, Peteraj)

No.	Title	Featured artist(s)	Length
1.	"Vianočný popevok"	Gombitová	2:43
2.	"To, čo je v nás"	Gombitová and Patejdl	2:55
3.	"Prskavky"	Children's Choir of Czechoslovak Radio	2:41
4.	"Snehové sypané"	Gombitová, Patejdl, Lehotský, Müller	4:05
5.	"Slávnosť úprimných slov"	Gombitová, Patejdl, Lehotský	3:17
Total length:			15:41

== Personnel ==
- Marika Gombitová – lead vocals, songwriting
- Václav Patejdl – lead vocals, songwriting
- Ján Lehotský – lead vocals, songwriting
- Richard Müller – lead vocals
- Children's Choir of Czechoslovak Radio – backing vocals
- Július Kinček – producer
