= Vlaky s rokmi =

Studio album by Modus
- Released: 1986
- Recorded: 1986
- Genre: Pop
- Length: 45:46
- Label: OPUS (#9113 1632)
- Producer: Ján Lauko

Modus chronology
Každý niečo hrá (1985)	Vlaky s rokmi (1986)	Zrkadlo rokov (1987)

Singles from Vlaky s rokmi
- 1. "Kapely starnú"

Vlaky s rokmi (in English transcribed as Friends) is the seventh studio album by Modus, released on OPUS in 1986.

== Track listing ==
All tracks are written by Lehotský and Peteraj.

No.	Title	Featured artist(s)	Length
1.	"Kapely starnú"	Ján Lehotský and Pavol Hammel	3:27
2.	"Hop, hop malí žiaci"	Lehotský and Ivona Novotná	3:43
3.	"Skrotený"	Lehotský	4:44
4.	"Lepšie je žiť"	Lehotský and Novotná	3:47
5.	"Od tretej do piatej"	Lehotský	4:29
6.	"Computer"	Lehotský and Novotná	3:10
7.	"Náš tep"	Lehotský	3:27
8.	"Keď vrelo véčko"	Lehotský, Hammel and Peter Lipa	3:43
9.	"Kniha tajných želaní"	Lehotský and Novotná	3:59
10.	"Karty sú už rozdané"	Lehotský and Novotná	4:19
11.	"Detičky z jaslí"	Ľuboš Stankovský	3:42
12.	"Vlaky s rokmi"	Lehotský and Novotná	3:36
Total length:			45:46

== Official releases ==
- 1986 Vlaky s rokmi, LP, MC, CD, OPUS, #9113 1632
- 1987 Friends, LP, MC, OPUS, #9113 1776

== Credits and personnel ==
- Ján Lehotský – lead vocal, chorus, writer, keyboards
- Pavol Hammel - lead vocal
- Ivona Novotná - lead vocal
- Peter Lipa - lead vocal
- Ľuboš Stankovský - lead vocal
- Kamil Peteraj – lyrics
