= Dúhy =

Studio album by Miroslav Žbirka
- Released: 2005
- Genre: Pop
- Length: 61:49
- Label: Universal (#987 373-5)
- Producer: Aleš Zenkl; Honza Horáček; David Koller; Jan P. Muchow

Miroslav Žbirka chronology
Live (2004)	Dúhy (2005)	Gold (2005)

Marika Gombitová chronology
Gold (2005)	Dúhy (2005)	Gold (2005)

Dúhy (Rainbows) is the thirteenth studio album by Slovak singer Miroslav Žbirka, released on Universal Music in 2005.

== Track listing ==
All tracks are written by Miro Žbirka

No.	Title	Featured artist	Length
1.	"Niečo vymyslím"		3:32
2.	"Kráľovná rannej krásy"		4:29
3.	"Někdy stačí dát jen dech"	Iva Frühlingová	2:42
4.	"Smútok"		3:35
5.	"Už viem"		3:04
6.	"Láskoliek"		3:26
7.	"Mne sa páči"		3:26
8.	"Domino"		3:08
9.	"Čaj o piatej"		3:08
10.	"Dúhy"		3:50
11.	"Watch You Sleep"		2:39
12.	"Stále idem za tebou"		3:23
13.	"Dievča mojich snov"		3:15
14.	"Popolavá"		3:19
15.	"Tajnosľubná"	Marika Gombitová	3:09
16.	"You're Not Around"	David Koller	5:18
Total length:			55:23

Bonus Tracks
No.	Title	Featured artist	Length
17.	"Někdy stačí dát jen dech (TV Version)"	Frühlingová	2:45
18.	"Kráľovná rannej krásy (Radio Edit)"		3:39
Total length:			61:49

The Best of Tour, DVD
No.	Title	Featured artist(s)	Length
19.	"22 dní"
20.	"Denisa"
21.	"Dr. Jekyll a Mr. Hyde"
22.	"Bezchybná"
23.	"Múr našich lások"
24.	"Možno sa ti zdá"
25.	"Milonkrát"
26.	"Zima, zima"
27.	"Cesta zakázanou rýchlosťou"
28.	"Ako obrázok"
29.	"Balada o poľných vtákoch"
30.	"Veľký sen mora"	Ján Lehotský
31.	"Co bolí to přebolí"	Martha
32.	"Biely kvet"
33.	"Atlantída"
34.	"Mám rád"
35.	"VIDEO: "Někdy stačí dát jen dech"	Linda Rybová
36.	"VIDEO: "Láskoliek"
37.	"VIDEO: "Domino"
38.	"VIDEO: "Kráľovná rannej krásy"
39.	"VIDEO: "Mám ťa viac" (New track)
40.	"VIDEO: "Cesta zakázanou rýchlosťou"	David Žbirka
41.	"VIDEO: "Balada o poľných vtákoch (Meky Revival)"
42.	"PHOTOGALLERY: "Medley ("V slepých uličkách", "Katka", "Prvá)"
43.	"EXTRAS: "Náladový song" (New track)	Martha and Laco Deczi
Total length:			61:49

== Official releases ==
- 2005: Dúhy, CD, Universal Music, No. 987 373-5
- 2006: Dúhy: The Best of Tour, CD/DVD, Universal Music, #170 824-4

== Credits and personnel ==
- Miroslav Žbirka – lead vocal, writer, acoustic guitar, co-producer
- Marika Gombitová – lead vocal
- Iva Frühlingová – lead vocal
- Aleš Zenkl – producer
- Honza Horáček – producer
- David Koller – back vocal, producer
- Jan P. Muchow – producer
- Jiří Charypar – mastered-by

== Charts ==
Chart (2005)	Peak position
Czech Albums Chart	12
