= Každý niečo hrá =

Studio album by Modus
- Released: 1985
- Recorded: 1985
- Genre: Pop
- Length: 42:52
- Label: OPUS (#9113 1632)
- Producer: Ján Lauko

Modus chronology
Najlepšie dievčatá (1984)	Každý niečo hrá (1985)	Vlaky s rokmi (1986)

Singles from Každý niečo hrá
- 1. "Domov kráča trieda"

Každý niečo hrá (English: Everybordy Plays) is the sixth studio album by Modus, released on OPUS in 1985.

== Track listing ==
All tracks are written by Lehotský and Peteraj.

No.	Title	Featured artist(s)	Length
1.	"Má iba 16 a 1 deň"	Milan Vyskočáni	4:08
2.	"Domov kráča trieda"	Ján Lehotský	3:39
3.	"Tichá voda"	Marián Greksa	3:14
4.	"K.O."	Vyskočáni	3:34
5.	"Každý niečo hrá"		3:54
6.	"Cirkusanti"	Lehotský and Ľuboš Stankovský	4:20
7.	"Blesk na perách"	Greksa	3:37
8.	"Udržujte čistotu"	Greksa	3:31
9.	"Klubový lev"	Lehotský and Greksa	4:20
10.	"Slepé balady"	Greksa and Stankovský	3:57
11.	"Prepadák"	Lehotský	4:38
Total length:			42:52

== Official releases ==
- 1985 Najlepšie dievčatá, LP, MC, CD, OPUS, #9113 1632
- 1985 Everybody Plays, LP, MC, OPUS, #9113 1648

== Credits and personnel ==
- Ján Lehotský – lead vocal, chorus, writer, keyboards
- Milan Vyskočáni – lead vocal
- Marián Greksa – lead vocal
- Ľuboš Stankovský – lead vocal
- Kamil Peteraj – lyrics
- Ján Lauko – producer
- Štefan Danko – responsible editor
- Vladimír Kaššay – bass
- Jiří Vana – electric guitar, acoustic guitar
- Juraj Filo – sound engineer
- Igor Adamec – technician
- Imrich Diskantini – tenox saxophone
- Michaela Kordová-Šimková – design

== See also ==
- The 100 Greatest Slovak Albums of All Time
