= Modus (band) =

Slovak pop rock band

- Origin: Bratislava, Czechoslovakia
- Genres: Rock, pop
- Years active: 1967–1972, 1973–1989; 2002–2003 (Reunion)
- Labels: Opus Records

Modus was a Slovak pop band, originally established in 1967 by Stanislav Hrda, Ján Baláž, Peter Krutek, Juraj Czinege, Tomáš Bery Psota, Ľubomír Stankovský, Gabriel Wertlen and Miroslav Žbirka in the former Czechoslovakia. The formation (identified nowadays as Modus 0) initially played cover versions of the 60's hits. A major change followed after the arrival of Ján Lehotský who joined the ensemble in 1972, and became their leader. The years 1976-80, which included albums Modus (1979) and Balíček snov (1980), referred to as Modusmania, denoted the band's stardom era.

== Past members ==
- Stanislav Hrda - piano, keyboards (1967–68)
- Ján Baláž - solo guitar (1967–72, 74-75)
- Miro Žbirka - lead vocal, guitar (1967–72, 76-81)
- Gabriel Wertlen - bass (1967–70)
- Ľubo Stankovský - drum (67-72,74), lead vocal (83-86)
- Peter Krutek - vocals, trumpet (1967–70)
- Juraj Czinege - vocals, saxophone, clarinet (1967)
- Tomáš "Bery" Psota - vocals, trombone (1967)
- Tomáš Berka - vocals, keyboards (1968)
- Eugen Kratochvíla - piano, keyboards (1969–70)
- Mikuláš Gürtler - vocals, others (1970)
- Vladimír Kaššay - bass (1970–72, 83-86)
- Ján Lehotský - lead vocal, piano, keyboards (1972–89)
- Ľudovít Nosko - lead vocal, bass (1974)
- Ladislav Severa - solo guitar (1975)
- Ladislav Lučenič - bass (1975, 77)
- Cyril Zeleňák - drum (1975)
- Karel Witz - solo guitar (1976) (as guest in 80)
- Štefan Havaši - bass (1976)
- Miroslav Jevčák - drum (1976–78)
- Marika Gombitová - lead vocal, others (1976–83)
- Viliam Pobjecký - solo guitar (1977–79)
- Dušan Hájek - drums (1979–80)
- Ján Hangóni - lead vocal, solo guitar (1981–83)
- Anastasios Engonidis - bass (1981–83)
- Karol Morvay - lead vocal, drum (1981–83)
- Jiří Vana - solo guitar (1983–86)
- Marián Greksa - lead vocal, others (1984–85)
- Milan Vyskočáni - lead vocal, others (1985)
- Ivona Novotná - lead vocal, others (1985–88)
- Miroslav Šulc - solo guitar (1987–89)
- Miroslav Valenta - solo guitar, keyboards (1987–89)
- Peter Palkovič - bass (1987–89)
- Ivan Marček - drum (1987)
- Jozef Paulíni - lead vocal (1987–88)
- Peter Szapu - drum (1988)
- Peter Beláni - drum (1988–89)
- Iveta Sedláková - lead vocal, others (1988–89)
- Marcela Březinová - lead vocal, vocals (1989)
- Lešek Semelka - lead vocal, others (1989)

Guest performances

- Imrich Diskantíni - tenor saxophone (1985)
- Ján Fabrický - drum (1988)

== Discography ==
=== Albums ===
==== Studio albums ====
Year	Album details	GSA
1979	Modus: Label: OPUS (#9116 0856); Format: LP, CD, CC	41
1980	Balíček snov: Label: OPUS (#9116 0999); Format: LP, CD, CC	—
1981	99 zápaliek: Label: OPUS (#9113 1215); Format: LP, CD, CC	37
1983	Záhradná kaviareň: Label: OPUS (#9113 1346); Format: LP, CC	—
1984	Najlepšie dievčatá: Label: OPUS (#9113 1549); Format: LP, CC	—
1985	Každý niečo hrá: Label: OPUS (#9113 1632); Format: LP, CC	—
1986	Vlaky s rokmi: Label: OPUS (#9113 1776); Format: LP, CC	—
1988	Keď sa raz oči dohodnú: Label: OPUS (#9313 1989); Format: LP, CD, CC	—
"—" denotes an album that did not enter the GSA list.

==== Export albums ====
Year	Album details
1980	Modus: Label: OPUS (#9116 0974); Format: LP, CD, CC
1985	The Best Girls: Label: OPUS (#9113 1587); Format: LP, CC
1985	Everybody Plays: Label: OPUS (#9113 1648); Format: LP, CC
1987	Friends: Label: OPUS (#9113 1776); Format: LP, CC

==== Compilations ====
Year	Album details
1987	Zrkadlo rokov: Label: OPUS (#9113 1867); Format: LP, CC
1995	The Best of 1977–1988: Vol 1: Label: Open Music (#0033 2312); Format: 2CD
1998	The Best of 1979–1988: Vol 2: Label: Open Music (#0064 2312); Format: 2CD
1998	Úsmev: Label: Bonton Music (#49 1722); Format: CD
2005	Gold: Label: OPUS (#91 2708-2); Format: CD

=== Singles ===
==== As lead artist ====
Year	Single details		Label	Catalogue
Year	A-side	B-side	Label	Catalogue
1972	"Suzi"	"Starý pán"	OPUS	#9043 0166
1973	"Cesta so psom"	"Nevolaj viac"	OPUS	#9043 0260
1974	"Formula 1"	"Sen o tebe"	OPUS	#9143 0361
1977	"Veľký sen mora"	"Preteky s láskou"	OPUS	#9143 0438
1977	"Margaréta"	"Záhadná"^{[A]}	OPUS	#9143 0439
1977	"Úsmev"	"Deň ako z pohľadnice"^{[B]}	OPUS	#9143 0440
1977	"Stará láska"	Unknown	OPUS	#9143 0???
1980	"Mágovo číslo"	"Naposledy"	OPUS	#9143 0540
1981	"Spoluhráčka"	"Stará kára"	OPUS	#9143 0558
1982	"Zrkadlo rokov"	"Dnes už viem"^{[C]}	OPUS	#9143 0573
1984	"Otec a syn"	Unknown	OPUS	#9143 0260
1985	"(Domov kráča) Trieda"	"Má iba 16+1 deň"	OPUS	#9143 0635
1986	"Kapely starnú"	"Lepšie je žiť"	OPUS	#9143 0654
1990	"Plátené dievča"	Unknown	OPUS	#9143 0748

==== As featured artist ====
Year	Single details		Label	Catalogue
Year	A-side	B-side	Label	Catalogue
1977	"Zažni"^{[A]}	"Správa o ľuďoch"^{[A]}	OPUS	#9143 0441
1977	"Boľavé námestie"^{[B]}	"Ty vieš, mama"^{[B]}	OPUS	#9143 0446
1977	"Letná láska"^{[A]}	"Kráľ detských ciest"	OPUS	#9143 0450
1977	"Známy tón"^{[A]}	"Drahá"^{[A]}	OPUS	#9143 0461
1978	"Dievčatá"^{[A]}	"Čím viac máš"^{[A]}	OPUS	#9143 0471
1979	"Vyznanie"^{[B]}	"Malý veľký vlak"^{[A]}	OPUS	#9143 0500
1980	"Kufor a šál"^{[B]}	"Nostalgia"^{[B]}	OPUS	#9143 0521
1980	"Domy na zbúranie"^{[B]}	"Vieš byť zlá"^{[A]}	OPUS	#9143 0522
1980	"Svet stromov"^{[B]}	"Tajomstvo hier"^{[E]}	OPUS	#9143 0528
1980	"Klaun z domu č. 6"^{[A]}	"V slepých uličkách"^{[D]}	OPUS	#9143 0538
1980	"Cirkusový kôň"^{[B]}	"Deň letí"^{[B]}	OPUS	#9143 0539
1982	"Srdcia dievčat"^{[B]}	"Slnečný kalendár"^{[B]}	OPUS	#9143 0561
1983	"Záhradná kaviareň"^{[B]}	"Aký som"	OPUS	#9143 0595

Notes

- A Denotes a solo single by Miro Žbirka.
- B Denotes a solo single by Marika Gombitová.
- C Denotes a solo single by Pavol Hammel, no contribution.
- D Denotes a solo single by Žbirka featuring Gombitová.
- E Denotes a single by Lehotský and Gombitová

== See also ==
- Marika Gombitová discography
- Marika Gombitová awards
- Car accident of Marika Gombitová
- The 100 Greatest Slovak Albums of All Time
