= Keď sa raz oči dohodnú =

Studio album by Modus
- Released: 1988
- Recorded: 1988
- Genre: Pop
- Length: 49:14
- Label: OPUS (#9313 1989)

Modus chronology
Zrkadlo rokov (1987)	Keď sa raz oči dohodnú (1988)	The Best of 1977–1988: Vol 1 (1995)

Keď sa raz oči dohodnú is the eight studio album by the Modus band, released on OPUS Records in 1988.

== Track listing ==
All tracks are written by Lehotský and Peteraj

No.	Title	Featured artist(s)	Length
1.	"Keď sa raz oči dohodnú"	Ivona Novotná and Jozef Paulíny	4:02
2.	"Snívaj, lietaj, bež a skáč"	Ján Lehotský, Novotná and Paulíny	3:50
3.	"Dueto alebo správna rana do srdca"	Novotná and Paulíny	4:34
4.	"Stereo podraz"	Lehotský	5:25
5.	"V rozopnutej bunde"	Novotná	3:40
6.	"Deň slávy s príchuťou prachov"	Paulíny	5:11
7.	"Roberta"	Paulíny	4:22
8.	"Smútok sobotňajších internátov"	Paulíny	3:44
9.	"Kamarátka do prehraných polčasov"	Lehotský	3:40
10.	"Spakovaný muž"	Paulíny	3:57
11.	"Skús"	Novotná and Paulíny	3:42
12.	"Šesť minút"	Paulíny	3:06
Total length:			49:14

== Official releases ==
- 1988: Keď sa raz oči dohodnú, LP, MC, CD, OPUS, #9313 1989

== Credits and personnel ==
- Ján Lehotský – lead vocal, writer, keyboards
- Kamil Peteraj – lyrics
- Ivona Novotná – lead vocal
- Jozef Paulíny – lead vocal
