= Môj malý príbeh =

Studio album by Marika Gombitová
- Released: 1981
- Recorded: 1980
- Genre: Big beat; pop
- Length: 41:28
- Label: OPUS (#9113 1149)
- Producer: Ján Lauko

Marika Gombitová chronology
Doktor Sen (1980)	Môj malý príbeh (1981)	99 zápaliek (1981)

Singles from Môj malý príbeh
- 1. "Svet stromov" 2. "Cirkusový kôň"/"Deň letí"

Môj malý príbeh (English: My Little Story) is the second solo album by Marika Gombitová released on OPUS in 1981.

== Track listing ==
All tracks are written by Lehotský and Peteraj, unless stated otherwise.

No.	Title	Writer(s)	Length
1.	"Planéta nádej"		3:46
2.	"Cirkusový kôň"	Lauko; Peteraj	4:52
3.	"Pomätená"		4:53
4.	"Hviezdy od konca sveta"	Gombitová; Peteraj	3:53
5.	"Svet stromov"		5:12
6.	"Pieseň na 1000 a 1 noc"	Hammel; Peteraj	3:14
7.	"Malinový dáždnik"	Lauko; Peteraj	2:49
8.	"Deň letí"	Gombitová; Peteraj	2:40
9.	"Keď zametú" (duet with Ján Lehotský)		4:12
10.	"Môj milý"		4:58
11.	"Na rozlúčku"	Gombitová; Peteraj	3:22
Total length:			43:51

Môj malý príbeh: Komplet 2 (Bonus Tracks)
No.	Title	Writer(s)	Length
12.	"Tajomstvo hier" (duet with Lehotský, taken from Záhradná kaviareň)		4:40
13.	"Výmeny" (previously unreleased)	Hammel; Peteraj	3:18
14.	"Chcem sa s tebou deliť" (previously unreleased)	Hammel; Peteraj	3:27
Total length:			55:16

Môj malý príbeh: Collectors Edition (Bonus CD)
No.	Title	Writer(s)	Length
12.	"Máme svoje tajné plány" (taken from Smoliari)	Brezovský; Peteraj	2:38
13.	"Správne dievča" (taken from Smoliari)	Brezovský; Peteraj	3:00
14.	"Keby sa len trochu o mňa bál" (taken from Smoliari)	Brezovský; Peteraj	3:24
15.	"Tajná šťastná hviezda" (duet with Miroslav Žbirka, taken from Smoliari)	Brezovský; Peteraj	3:05
16.	"Dieťa z dobrej rodiny I" (taken from Neberte nám princeznú)	Ursiny; Štrasser	2:42
17.	"Dieťa z dobrej rodiny II" (duet with Žbirka, taken from Neberte nám princeznú)	Ursiny; Štrasser	1:35
18.	"Šaty" (taken from Neberte nám princeznú)	Ursiny; Štrasser	3:07
19.	"Svitá" (taken from Neberte nám princeznú)	Ursiny; Štrasser	2:24
20.	"Budem tu s vami" (taken from Neberte nám princeznú)	Ursiny; Štrasser	2:32
21.	"Trochu tuším, trochu viem" (taken from Neberte nám princeznú)	Ursiny; Štrasser	2:29
22.	"Tri slová" (trio with Žbirka and Marie Rottrová, taken from Neberte nám princeznú)	Ursiny; Štrasser	3:02
Total length:			71:26

== Official releases ==
- 1981: Môj malý príbeh, LP, MC, OPUS, #9113 1149
- 1995: Môj malý príbeh, CD, re-release, Open Music #0025 2331
- 2001: Môj malý príbeh: Komplet 2, 3 bonus tracks, CD, Sony Music Bonton, #50 4534
- 2004: Môj malý príbeh: Komplet 2, 3 bonus tracks, CD, OPUS, #91 1149
- 2008: Môj malý príbeh: 2CD Collectors Edition, bonus CD, OPUS, #91 2792

== Credits and personnel ==
- Marika Gombitová - lead vocal, writer
- Ján Lehotský - lead vocal, writer
- Ján Lauko - writer, producer
- Pavol Hammel - writer
- Kamil Peteraj - lyrics
- Jozef Hanák - sound direction
- Peter Procházka - photography
- Ali Brezovský - writer (bonus tracks 12–15, Bonus CD)
- Dežo Ursiny - writer (bonus tracks 16–22, Bonus CD)
- Ján Štrasser - lyrics (bonus tracks 16–22, Bonus CD)
