= Tak som chcela všetkých milovať =

Song by Marika Gombitová

from the album Vyznanie
- Language: Slovak
- Released: 2007
- Genre: Pop rock
- Length: 4:00
- Label: OPUS
- Songwriters: Vašo Patejdl; Kamil Peteraj
- Producer: Vašo Patejdl

Audio sample
- "Tak som chcela všetkých milovať (Remix)": file; help

"Tak som chcela všetkých milovať" (So Much I Meant to Love You All) is a song by Marika Gombitová released on OPUS in 2007.

The composition was originally written by Vašo Patejdl and Kamil Peteraj for the 2003 musical Adam Šangala (based on Ladislav Nádaši-Jégé's novel). Gombitová recorded the song as the only new track to promote her retrospective compilation entitled Vyznanie, reaching at number twenty on the Slovak Airplay Chart.

In addition, the single was remixed by Jaroslav Šimek, and released as a free download single in 2008.

== Official versions ==
1. "Tak som chcela všetkých milovať" – Original version, 2007
2. "Tak som chcela všetkých milovať (Jarek Šimek Remix)" – Remixed version, 2008

== Credits and personnel ==
- Marika Gombitová – lead vocal
- Vašo Patejdl – writer
- Kamil Peteraj – lyrics

== Charts ==
Chart (2007)	Peak position
Rádio Top 100 Oficiálna	63
Rádio SK 50 Oficiálna	20
