= Ladislav Lučenič =

Slovak musician and producer (born 1952)

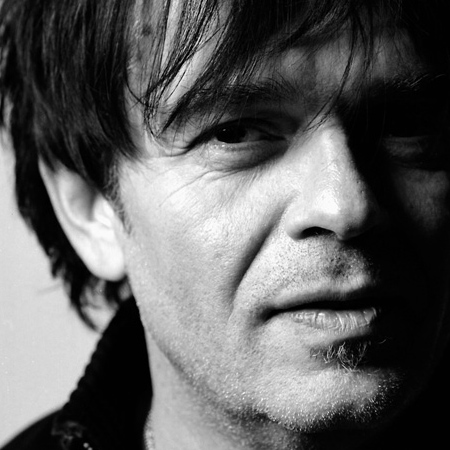

Laco Lučenič (born 23 November 1952) is a Slovak musician and music producer. He is known as a former member of such Slovak bands as Fermáta, Prúdy, Modus, and Limit. He became popular for his role as a judge on the Slovak Pop Idol (Slovensko hľadá SuperStar).

Growing up in the 1960s, he became fascinated by the "electrifying" music of the Beatles, Kinks, Rolling Stones, and others. In his project called "Satisfactory", he plays music from the 1960s. In November 2006, the show was released on DVD Satisfactory Live In Concert on the Lučenič's own label doubleL. Lučenič is also the author of a 1960s encyclopaedia.

As a guitarist, he has played with other musicians (Pavol Hammel, Marián Varga, Miro Žbirka), along with producing albums (HEX, IMT Smile, Peha, Slobodná Európa, and also Marika Gombitová). His own albums "Bodliak na plavkách", "Zastávky na znamenie" and "Svetlo (...a pocit bezpečia)" have been released as a 2-CD set called Laco Lučenič Komplet.

== Discography ==
Studio albums

- 1985: Bodliak na plavkách, OPUS
- 1987: Zastávky na znamenie, OPUS
- 1995: Svetlo (...a pocit bezpečia), BMG
- 1996: Išla myška briežkom with Beáta Dubasová & Kopytovci, Musica
- 1997: Good Vibes: Remixes as Double L & Vinyl Culture, PolyGram
- 2000: Proudy (Tribute to Prúdy), Warner
- 2007: XLL, doubleL records

Other appearances

- 1979: Modus by Modus
- 1979: Dievča do dažďa by Marika Gombitová
- 1980: Balíček snov by Modus
- 1983: Mince na dne fontán by Marika Gombitová
- 1984: №5 by Marika Gombitová
