= Svet stromov =

Single by Marika Gombitová

from the album Môj malý príbeh
- B-side: "Tajomstvo hier" (with Lehotský)
- Released: 1980
- Recorded: 1979/80
- Genre: Pop rock
- Length: 5:12
- Label: OPUS (#9143 0528)
- Songwriters: Janko Lehotský; Kamil Peteraj
- Producer: Ján Lauko

Marika Gombitová singles chronology
"Domy na zbúranie" (1980)	"Svet stromov" (1980)	"Cirkusový kôň" (1980)

Audio sample
- "Svet stromov": file; help

Music video
- "Svet stromov" on YouTube

"Svet stromov" (The World of Trees) is a song by Marika Gombitová, released as a single by OPUS in 1980.

The composition was written by Janko Lehotský and Kamil Peteraj, being released with "Tajomstvo hier" (duet with Lehotský) on B-side .

== Official versions ==
1. "Svet stromov" – Studio version, 1980

== Credits and personnel ==
- Marika Gombitová – lead vocal
- Janko Lehotský – lead vocal, music
- Kamil Peteraj – lyrics
- OPUS Records – copyright
