= Úsmev =

1977 single by Modus

Single by Modus featuring Janko Lehotský, Miroslav Žbirka, Marika Gombitová and Miroslav Jevčák

from the album OPUS '77
- B-side: "Deň ako z pohľadnice" by Marika Gombitová
- Released: 1977
- Recorded: 1977
- Genre: Big beat
- Length: 3:27
- Label: OPUS (#9143 0440)
- Songwriters: Janko Lehotský; Kamil Peteraj

Marika Gombitová singles chronology
"Úsmev" (1977)	"Boľavé námestie" (1977)

Audio sample
- "Úsmev": file; help

"Úsmev" (English: Smile) is a song by the band Modus released on OPUS in 1977.

The composition that featured lead vocals by Janko Lehotský, Miroslav Žbirka, Marika Gombitová and Miroslav Jevčák won the Golden award at the Bratislavská lýra '77 in the contest of the Czechoslovak authors. It also received the Audience Choice award.

Originally, the song was released on the vinyl compilation OPUS '77. To B-side of the single was attached a solo track by Gombitová, "Deň ako z pohľadnice" (written by Lehotský with Zoro Laurinc (Note: Liner notes of Modus Úsmev compilation denote "Deň ako z pohľadnice" to be written by Igor Bázlik and Zoro Laurinc, which is mistaken.Likely due to Gombitová's another song with a similar title — "Deň" from 1978 (released on VA Mladá pieseň).)).

== Official versions ==
1. "Úsmev" - Studio version, Bratislavská lýra, 1978

== Credits and personnel ==
- Janko Lehotský - lead vocal, music
- Miroslav Žbirka - lead vocal
- Marika Gombitová - lead vocal
- Miroslav Jevčák - lead vocal
- Kamil Peteraj - lyrics
- OPUS Records - copyright

== Awards ==
=== Bratislavská lýra ===
Bratislavská lýra (English: Bratislava Lyre) was an annual festival of popular songs in former Czechoslovakia, established in 1966 in Bratislava. Two competitions were held; the category of Czechoslovak songwriters and the international contest. Winners were awarded by a golden, silver and/or bronze Lyre (depending on a position). Special prizes included Audience Choice, Journalists Choice, and Lifetime Achievement award. Gombitová won seven awards in total - three golden lyres (1977–78), one of silver (1979) and bronze (1980), plus an Audience Choice award (1977).

Year	Nominated work	Category	Result
1977	"Úsmev"	Czechoslovak Authors	Gold
1977	"Úsmev"	Audience Choice	Won

== Cover versions ==
The rapper Rytmus and the singer Igor Kmeťo of Kmetoband recorded a cover version of the song to serve as the theme song of the movie Invalid.
