= Ľubomír Stankovský =

Slovak musician (1951–2024)

- Also known as: Ľuboš Stankovský, Kyslík, Sklíčko
- Born: 23 August 1951; Bratislava, Czechoslovakia
- Died: 8 March 2024 (aged 72) Bratislava, Slovakia
- Genres: Pop rock
- Instruments: Voice, drums
- Years active: 1967–2024
- Member of: Modus

Ľubomír Stankovský (23 August 1951 – 8 March 2024) was a Slovak pop rock musician. He was well known for the hit song Ty, ja a môj brat.

== Career ==
Ľubomír Stankovský was born on 23 August 1951 in Bratislava, where he lived until his death. In 1967, he co-founded the rock band Modus together with Ján Baláž and Miroslav Žbirka. Stankovský remained a member of Modus, playing drums, until 1973.

Following his departure from Modus, Stankovský continued his career as a rock and pop drummer through collaborations with a variety of artists. He recorded six albums with Vladimír Hronec, Dežo Ursiny, Milan Lasica, Jaroslav Filip as well as the bands Elán, Prognóza, Burčiak and Provisorium.

In 1980s, Stankovský started to play with Modus again. In 1984, the song Ty, ja a môj brat, better known by the refrain lyric Odrazové sklíčka dotykov became a huge hit. The song, composed by Ján Lehotský with lyrics written by Kamil Peteraj, was performed by Stankovský in an untraditional role of a lead singer. It was originally not intended as a hit single. In fact, it did not even get a music video until 2023. Nonetheless, it became one of the biggest hits of the 1980s popular music in Czechoslovakia and remained among the most recognized Slovak songs even 40 years after it came out.

In 2018 Stankovský and Beláž revived Modus to record its last album ReGenerácia.

== Death ==
Stankovský died in Bratislava on 8 March 2024, at the age of 72. His death was announced by Modus on the band's social media.
