= Záhradná kaviareň (song) =

Single by Marika Gombitová

from the album Záhradná kaviareň
- B-side: "Aký som" (by Modus)
- Released: 1983
- Recorded: 1983
- Genre: Pop
- Length: 4:03
- Label: OPUS (#9143 0595)
- Songwriters: Janko Lehotský; Kamil Peteraj

Marika Gombitová singles chronology
"Srdcia dievčat" (1982)	"Záhradná kaviareň" (1983)	"Nenápadná" (1986)

Audio sample
- "Záhradná kaviareň": file; help

"Záhradná kaviareň" (Garden Café) is a song by Marika Gombitová released on OPUS in 1983.

The composition, written by Lehotský along with Kamil Peteraj, was promoted as the third single taken from the album of the same name Záhradná kaviareň by Modus (1983).

== Official versions ==
1. "Záhradná kaviareň" – Studio version, 1983

== Credits and personnel ==
- Marika Gombitová – lead vocal
- Janko Lehotský – music, lead vocal
- Kamil Peteraj – lyrics
- OPUS – copyright
