= V obrazech II =

Soundtrack album by Petr Hapka
- Released: 2003
- Length: 70:16
- Label: B&M/Universal (#981 574-8)
- Producer: Richard Liegert

Petr Hapka chronology
V obrazech (2003)	V obrazech II (2003)	V obrazech III (2004)

Marika Gombitová chronology
Modrý album (2001)	V obrazech II (2003)	Gold (2005)

The back cover of the release

V obrazech (English: In Pictures) is the second set of the original motion pictures scores by Petr Hapka, which was released in 2003.

The forty tracks collection compiles his music written for the movies Upír z Feratu (English: Ferat Vampire, directed by Juraj Herz, 1982) Tisícročná včela (English: A Thousand-year-old Bee, directed by Juraj Jakubisko, 1983), Perinbaba (English: The Feather Fairy, also directed by Jakubisko, 1985).

Apart from others, the album also features vocal performances by Marika Gombitová on three tracks in total ("Jaro, léto, podzim, zima", "Píseň", and "Běh času").

== Track listing ==
All tracks are written by Hapka, except for the tracks 21 and 25 (Hapka and Feldek).

No.	Title	Performer	Length
1.	"Zámek Perinbaby" (taken from Perinbaba)		1:57
2.	"Motiv lásky" (taken from Perinbaba)		1:54
3.	"Komedianti" (taken from Perinbaba)		1:03
4.	"Smrt opuštěna bloudí polem" (taken from Perinbaba)		1:45
5.	"Motiv osudové věčnosti" (taken from Perinbaba)		1:51
6.	"Něžné harfy vzpomínek" (taken from Perinbaba)		1:45
7.	"Smutná láska" (taken from Perinbaba)		1:54
8.	"Cigáni jedou" (taken from Perinbaba)		1:53
9.	"Opět komedianti" (taken from Perinbaba)		1:34
10.	"Naděje" (taken from Perinbaba)		1:07
11.	"Smrt zemřela" (taken from Perinbaba)		1:02
12.	"Krásná celistka" (taken from Perinbaba)		1:00
13.	"Vzpomínka" (taken from Perinbaba)		0:55
14.	"V zámku Perinbaby" (taken from Perinbaba)		1:51
15.	"Zase jedou cikáni" (taken from Perinbaba)		1:05
16.	"Vítězná láska" (taken from Perinbaba)		1:49
17.	"Motiv včely" (taken from Tisícročná včela)		1:45
18.	"Jaro, léto, podzim, zima" (taken from Tisícročná včela)	Marika Gombitová	2:50
19.	"Velký svět" (taken from Tisícročná včela)		1:35
20.	"Tisícročná včela" (taken from Tisícročná včela)		3:15
21.	"Píseň" (taken from Tisícročná včela)	Gombitová	3:20
22.	"Válka" (taken from Tisícročná včela)		1:12
23.	"Odborová variace na E. M." (taken from Tisícročná včela)		3:50
24.	"Zahradní slavnost" (taken from Tisícročná včela)		1:00
25.	"Běh času" (taken from Tisícročná včela)	Gombitová	2:50
26.	"Opět velký svět" (taken from Tisícročná včela)		1:20
27.	"Běh života" (taken from Tisícročná včela)		2:39
28.	"Svítalo celou noc (Main theme)" (taken from Svítalo celou noc)		4:08
29.	"Od vraždy jenom... (Main theme)" (taken from Od vraždy jenom krok ke lži)		3:32
30.	"Motiv vnitřního hlasu"		1:03
31.	"Úřednický svět"		1:27
32.	"Opuštěnost"		1:00
33.	"Barovka"		1:47
34.	"Klid před bouří"		1:27
35.	"První variace"		1:40
36.	"Marná snaha"		2:12
37.	"Koncert kohosi v představách"		1:17
38.	"Závod"		0:31
39.	"Odevzdání"	Libuše Márová	1:07
40.	"Návrat Perinbaby"		1:53
Total length:			70:16

== Official releases ==
- 2003: V obrazech II, B&M Music, CD, #981 574-8

== Credits and personnel ==
- Petr Hapka – writer, piano
- Marika Gombitová – lead vocal (tracks 18, 21, 25)
- Libuše Márová – lead vocal (track 40)
- Symfonický orchester bratislavského rozhlasu – performer
- Mario Klemens – conductor (tracks 18, 21, 25)
- Ľubomír Feldek – lyrics (tracks 21, 25)
- Richard Liegert – producer
- Jakub Ludvík – photography
- Antalovských – design

== Charts ==
Chart (2004)	Peak position
Czech Albums Chart	22
