= Domy na zbúranie =

Single by Marika Gombitová

from the album Modus
- B-side: "Vieš byť zlá" by Miro Žbirka
- Released: 1980
- Recorded: 1979
- Genre: Pop rock
- Length: 5:27
- Label: OPUS (#9143 0522)
- Songwriters: Janko Lehotský; Kamil Peteraj
- Producer: Ján Lauko

Marika Gombitová singles chronology
"Kufor a šál" (1980)	"Domy na zbúranie" (1980)	"Svet stromov" (1980)

Audio sample
- "Domy na zbúranie": file; help

"Domy na zbúranie" (Houses to be Demolished) is a song by Marika Gombitová released by OPUS Records in 1980.

The single was written by Janko Lehotský and Kamil Peteraj, and issued initially on the various artists' compilation OPUS '79. An international version of the song was entitled "Lonely Night" in English, and attached to the Modus first export album. In 1997, the composition was remixed by Laco Lučenič to be released on the remix compilation Good Vibes: Remixes.

== Official versions ==
1. "Domy na zbúranie" – Original version, 1979
2. "Lonely Night" – International version, 1980
3. "Domy na zbúranie (Vital Remix) – Remixed version, 1997

== Credits and personnel ==
- Marika Gombitová – lead vocal
- Janko Lehotský – writer
- Kamil Peteraj – lyrics
- Ján Lauko – producer
- OPUS – copyright
