= Tajomstvo hier =

Song by Modus

from the album Záhradná kaviareň
- Language: Slovak
- Released: 1980
- Genre: Pop rock
- Length: 4:55
- Label: OPUS
- Songwriters: Janko Lehotský; Kamil Peteraj
- Producer: Ján Lauko

Audio sample
- "Tajomstvo hier": file; help

"Tajomstvo hier" (English: The Secret of the Games) is a song by the band Modus with lead vocals by Janko Lehotský and Marika Gombitová. released on OPUS in 1980.

The single, written by Janko Lehotský and Kamil Peteraj, won the Bronze award at the Bratislavská lýra '80 in the contest of the Czechoslovak authors.

However, the song was initially released as B-side of Gombitová's solo single "Svet stromov" in 1980, also on the Modus fourth set Záhradná kaviareň (1983).

== Official versions ==
1. "Tajomstvo hier" - Studio version, 1980

== Credits and personnel ==
- Janko Lehotský - lead vocal, music
- Marika Gombitová - lead vocal
- Kamil Peteraj - lyrics
- OPUS Records - copyright

== Awards ==
=== Bratislavská lýra ===
Bratislavská lýra (English: Bratislava Lyre) was an annual festival of popular songs in former Czechoslovakia, established in 1966 in Bratislava. Two competitions were held; the category of Czechoslovak songwriters and the international contest. Winners were awarded by a golden, silver and/or bronze Lyre (depending on a position). Special prizes included Audience Choice, Journalists Choice, and Lifetime Achievement award. Gombitová won seven awards in total - three golden lyres (1977–78), one of silver (1979) and bronze (1980), plus an Audience Choice award (1977).

| Year | Nominated work | Category | Result |
|---|---|---|---|
| 1980 | "Tajomstvo hier" | Czechoslovak Authors | Bronze |
