= Úsmev (album) =

Compilation album by Modus
- Released: 1998
- Recorded: 1970–78
- Genre: Big beat; pop
- Length: 65:50
- Label: Bonton (#491 722)

Modus chronology
The Best of 1979–1988: Vol 2 (1998)	Úsmev (1998)	Gold (2005)

Ján Lehotský chronology
The Best of 1979–1988: Vol 2 (1998)	Úsmev (1998)	Poslední a prví (2000)

Marika Gombitová chronology
The Best of the Best (1998)	Úsmev (1998)	Neberte nám princeznú (2001)

Miroslav Žbirka chronology
Meky (1997)	Úsmev (1998)	The Best Of 2 (1999)

The back cover of the release

Úsmev (The Smile) is the fourth compilation of greatest hits by Modus, released on Bonton in 1998.

== Track listing ==
All tracks are written by Lehotský and Peteraj, unless stated otherwise

One
No.	Title	Writer(s)	Featured artist(s)	Length
1.	"Smútok" (1970)	Kratochvíla; Hivešová	Miroslav Žbirka	2:56
2.	"Suzi"		Žbirka	2:27
3.	"Starý pán"	Lehotský; Filan		2:58
4.	"Cesta so psom"			3:42
5.	"Nevolaj viac"			4:11
6.	"Formula 1"	Lehotský; Zeman	Ľudovít Nosko	3:35
7.	"Sen o tebe"	Lehotský; Karšay	Ján Lehotský and Nosko	4:02
8.	"Úsmev"		Lehotský, Žbirka, Marika Gombitová and Miroslav Jevčák	3:29
9.	"Deň ako z pohľadnice"	Lehotský; Laurinc (Note: Liner notes of Modus Úsmev compilation denote "Deň ako z pohľadnice" to be written by Igor Bázlik and Zoro Laurinc, which is mistaken. Likely due to Gombitová's another song with a similar title — "Deň" from 1978 (released on VA Mladá pieseň).)	Gombitová	2:49
10.	"Zažni"	Žbirka; Štrasser	Žbirka	3:34
11.	"Správa o ľuďoch"	Lehotský; Filan	Žbirka	2:41
12.	"Veľký sen mora"	Lehotský; Filan	Lehotský	4:51
13.	"Preteky s láskou"	Lehotský; Karšay		4:29
14.	"Margaréta"	Lehotský; Karšay		2:26
15.	"Záhadná"	Lehotský; Karšay	Žbirka	4:42
16.	"Letná láska"	Lehotský; Filan	Žbirka	2:55
17.	"Známy tón"	Žbirka; Štrasser	Žbirka	3:26
18.	"Drahá"	Lehotský; Zeman	Žbirka	4:17
19.	"Dievčatá"		Žbirka	2:23
Total length:				65:50

== Official releases ==
- 1998: Úsmev, CD, Bonton, No. 491 722

== Credits and personnel ==
- Ján Lehotský – lead vocal, writer, keyboards
- Marika Gombitová – lead vocal, back vocal
- Miroslav Žbirka – writer, lead vocal, chorus, guitar
- Ľudovít Nosko – lead vocal
- Miroslav Jevčák – lead vocal
- Eugen Kratochvíla – writer
- Daniela Hivešová – lyrics
- Kamil Peteraj – lyrics
- Boris Filan – lyrics
- Ľuboš Zeman – lyrics
- Alexander Karšay – lyrics
- Ján Štrasser – lyrics

== See also ==
- The 100 Greatest Slovak Albums of All Time
