= Najlepšie dievčatá =

Studio album by Modus
- Released: 1984
- Recorded: 1984
- Genre: Pop
- Length: 39:18
- Label: OPUS (#9113 1549)

Modus chronology
Záhradná kaviareň (1983)	Najlepšie dievčatá (1984)	Každý niečo hrá (1985)

Singles from Najlepšie dievčatá
- 1. "Otec a syn"

Najlepšie dievčatá (English: The Best Girls) is the fifth studio album by Modus, released on OPUS in 1984.

== Track listing ==
All tracks are written by Lehotský and Peteraj.

No.	Title	Featured artist(s)	Length
1.	"Z pleca na plece"	Marián Greksa	2:51
2.	"Ale vyzerám"	Greksa	4:00
3.	"Otec a syn"	Ján Lehotský and Ľubomír Stankovský	4:58
4.	"Ty, ja a môj brat"	Stankovský	4:02
5.	"Kamoš z dvora"	Lehotský	4:23
6.	"Najlepšie dievčatá"	Greksa	3:14
7.	"Prenasledovateľ"	Greksa	3:36
8.	"Hudobníčka"	Lehotský and Stankovský	4:16
9.	"Opustená loď"	Lehotský	3:37
10.	"Predajňa strateného času"	Greksa and Lehotský	4:11
Total length:			39:18

== Official releases ==
- 1984: Najlepšie dievčatá, LP, MC, CD, OPUS, #9113 1549
- 1985: The Best Girls, LP, MC, OPUS, #9113 1587

== Credits and personnel ==
- Ján Lehotský – lead vocal, chorus, writer, keyboards
- Marián Greksa - lead vocal
- Ľuboš Stankovský - lead vocal
- Kamil Peteraj – lyrics

== See also ==
- The 100 Greatest Slovak Albums of All Time
