= Kmetoband =

Slovak musical band

Kmetoband (more properly "Kmeťoband") is a Slovak band which draws its inspiration from Romany music, playing self-described "rompop". As of 2008 they had released three albums, and had signed with EMI to release a fourth.
