= Beáta Dubasová =

Slovak singer (born 1963)

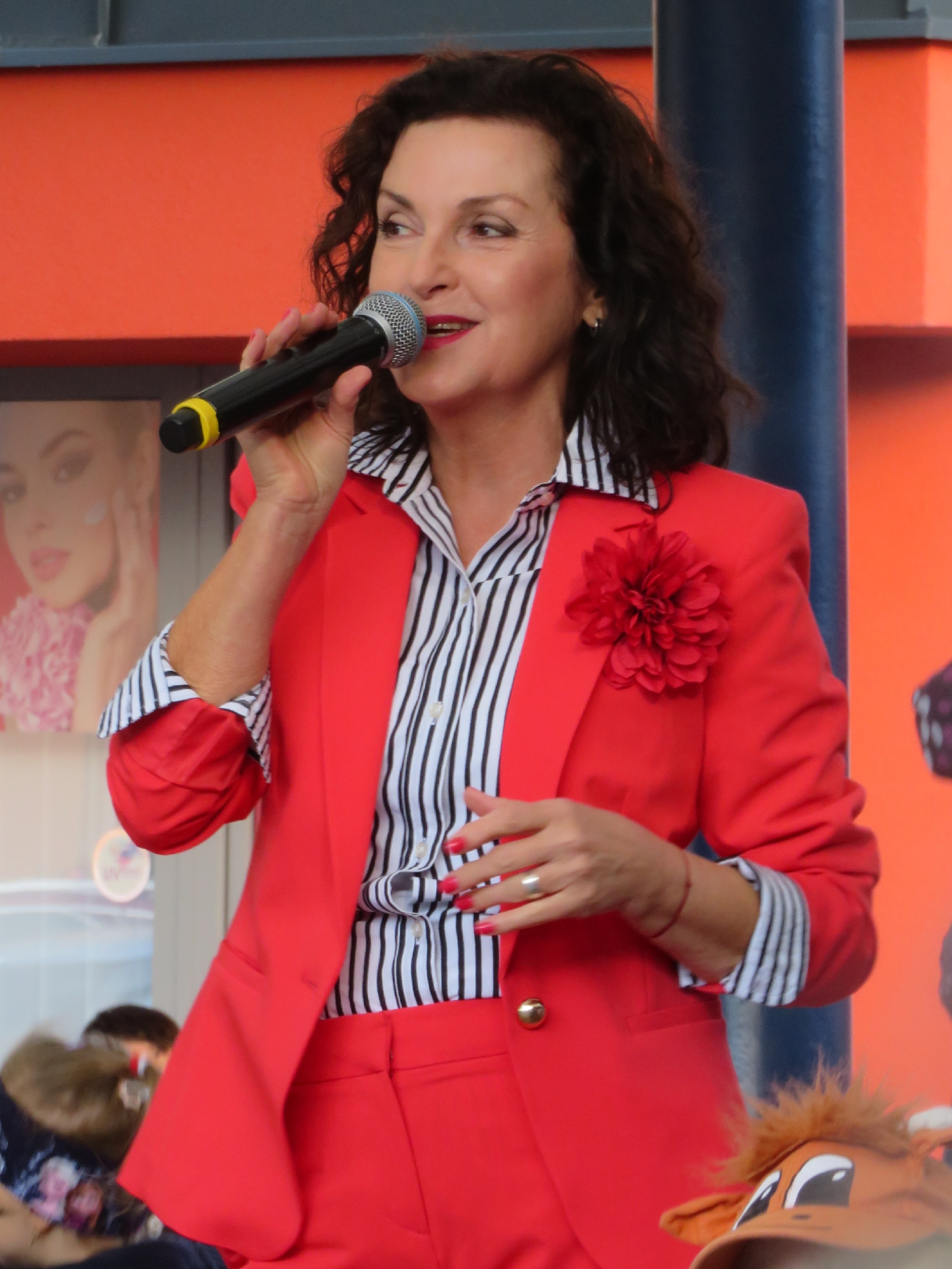
- Dubasová in 2023

Background information
- Born: 14 May 1963 (age 62); Stropkov, Czechoslovakia
- Genres: Pop
- Occupation: Singer
- Instrument: Vocals
- Years active: 1984–present
- Labels: Opus, Bonton Music
- Website: beatadubasova.sk

Beáta Dubasová (born 14 May 1963) is a Slovak pop singer who had an impact on the domestic music scene in the second half of the 1980s. She scored a number of hits, becoming a teen idol and maintaining her popularity into the 1990s. As of 2023, she has released six studio albums, two children's albums, and two compilations.

== Life and career ==
=== Beginnings ===
Beáta Dubasová was inclined towards music as a child, which led her to perform in various singing competitions in elementary school. When she was fourteen, she began to sing with her brother's band at village entertainment performances. Dubasová moved to Prešov to attend high school, where she began singing solo. This is where she met up-and-coming singer Peter Nagy, who wrote several songs for her after he saw her performing. Most of Dubasová's material at this point consisted of covers, including songs by one of her biggest inspirations, Suzi Quatro.

She soon began taking part in amateur singing competitions around Prešov and Košice, winning several audience prizes.

After graduating in 1982, Dubasová moved to Bratislava for work and continued to sing in the evenings. The same year, she received a call from singer Magda Medveďová, who invited her to perform one of her songs at the Košice Golden Treasure competition. Dubasová agreed and went on to win second place as well as the audience award. The jury at the competition included Pavol Danišovič and Ľuboš Zeman, two editors at Slovenský rozhlas, who subsequently offered to write songs for Dubasová.

=== Professional career ===
Dubasová started her professional singing career in 1984, with her backing band Kamene, when she hit domestic airwaves with the singles "Maznáčik" and "Účesy". In 1986, she performed at the Bratislavská lýra award ceremony. Her debut album, Beáta, released in 1987, included vocal and keyboard contributions from renowned musician Vašo Patejdl, of the pop-rock band Elán. Later that year, she recorded a children's album with Nagy and Patejdl, titled Peter, Vašo a Beáta deťom.

In 1988, the singer re-released her debut album in English and followed it with her next original record, Úschovňa pohľadov. In 1990, she published Za dverami mojej izby, which became her biggest success to date.

Modrý album was released in 1993 and included the hits "Vráť mi tie hviezdy" and "Ten príbeh je preč". In the latter half of the decade, Dubasová worked on her second children's album, titled Išla myška briežkom, which she published in 1996.

In 2000, the singer released the album 7 dní and followed it a year later with the compilation Beáta – to najlepšie. After a five-year break, she returned in 2006 with Ako chutí ráno and followed again a year later with the compilation Best Of.

== Personal life ==
Dubasová has been married since 1991 to Andrej Andrašovan, a sound engineer and son of composer and conductor Tibor Andrašovan. They have a son, Adam (born 1994), and live in Bratislava. According to her social media posts, Dubasová adheres to Roman Catholicism.

== Awards ==
- Journalists' Prize at Bratislavská lýra for "Muzikantské byty", a duet with Vašo Patejdl (1989)

== Discography ==
Studio albums

- Beáta (1987)
- Beáta – anglická verzia (1988)
- Úschovňa pohľadov (1988)
- Za dverami mojej izby (1990)
- Modrý album (1993)
- 7 dní (2000)
- Ako chutí ráno (2006)

Children's albums

- Peter, Vašo a Beáta deťom (1987)
- Išla myška briežkom (1996)

Compilations

- Beáta – to najlepšie (2001)
- Best Of (2007)

== See also ==
- The 100 Greatest Slovak Albums of All Time
