= Modus (album) =

1979 self-titled debut studio album by Modus

Studio album by Modus
- Released: 1979
- Recorded: February/March 1979
- Genre: Big beat; pop
- Length: 47:20
- Label: OPUS (#9116 0856)
- Producer: Ján Lauko

Modus chronology
Modus (1979)	Balíček snov (1980)

Singles from Modus
- 1. "Malý veľký vlak" 2. "Domy na zbúranie"/"Vieš byť zlá"

The back cover of the release

Modus is the debut album by Modus, released on OPUS in 1979.

== Track listing ==
All tracks are written by Lehotský and Peteraj, except tracks 4 and 12 (Lehotský and Filan), and 6, 9 and 13 (Žbirka and Peteraj)

No.	Title	Featured artist(s)	Length
1.	"Modus"	Ján Lehotský, Miroslav Žbirka and Marika Gombitová	2:47
2.	"Vieš byť zlá"	Žbirka	4:17
3.	"Slávnosť kvetín"	Gombitová	3:39
4.	"Prázdny rám"	Lehotský	4:59
5.	"Jedenásť poschodí"	Gombitová	3:15
6.	"Láska nám dvom všetko odpustí"	Žbirka	3:34
7.	"Malý veľký vlak"	Žbirka	3:39
8.	"Pripútaná"	Gombitová	4:58
9.	"Mám svoj vek"	Žbirka	3:07
10.	"Pieseň pre skrehnutých"	Lehotský	3:52
11.	"Domy na zbúranie"	Gombitová	5:27
12.	"Sladký hlas"	Lehotský	3:46
Total length:			47:20

Modus: Komplet 2 (Bonus Tracks)
No.	Title	Featured artist(s)	Length
13.	"Čím viac máš"	Žbirka	3:39
14.	"Vyznanie" (taken from Dievča do dažďa)	Gombitová	4:43
15.	"Svet stromov" (taken from Môj malý príbeh)	Gombitová	5:12
Total length:			60:54

== Official releases ==
- 1979: Modus, LP, MC, OPUS, #9116 0856
- 1995: Modus, CD, re-release, Open Music #0017 2331
- 2000: Modus: Komplet 2, 3 bonus tracks, CD, Bonton Music Slovakia, #9849 1722
- 2008: Modus: Slovenské legendárne albumy II, CD, SME, #91 0023

== Personnel ==
- Ján Lehotský - lead vocal, chorus, keyboards
- Marika Gombitová - lead vocal, chorus
- Miroslav Žbirka - lead vocal, chorus, electric and acoustic guitar
- Ladislav Lučenič - bass, electric and acoustic guitar, chorus
- Viliam Pobjecký - solo guitar
- Kamil Peteraj - notes
- Tibor Borský - photography
- Ján Lauko - producer
- Juraj Filo - sound director
- Štefan Danko - responsible editor

== Accolades ==
In 2007, Modus was ranked 41st on the list of the 100 Greatest Slovak Albums of All Time.

== Export release ==
Modus

Studio album by Modus
- Released: 1980
- Recorded: 1979
- Genre: Big beat; pop
- Length: 47:20
- Label: OPUS (#9113 0974)
- Producer: Ján Lauko

Modus chronology
Modus (1980)	The Best Girls (1985)

Back cover of the export release

The export version of the album, also entitled Modus, was issued in 1980.

=== Track listing ===
All tracks are written by Lehotský and Peteraj, except for the tracks 4 and 12 (Lehotský and Filan), and 6 and 9 (Žbirka and Peteraj)

No.	Title	Featured artist(s)	Length
1.	"Rock Is Not Dead"	Ján Lehotský, Miroslav Žbirka and Marika Gombitová	2:47
2.	"In the Morning"	Žbirka	4:17
3.	"My Train to Eden"	Gombitová	3:39
4.	"Denny"	Žbirka	4:59
5.	"Take Me to the Moonlight"	Gombitová	3:15
6.	"I'm Leading You"	Žbirka	3:34
7.	"No More Reasons (Coming Home)"	Žbirka	3:39
8.	"You Went Away"	Gombitová	4:58
9.	"Roll It Up"	Žbirka	3:07
10.	"I'm Not Only Dreaming"	Lehotský	3:52
11.	"Lonely Night"	Gombitová	5:27
12.	"Memory Band"	Lehotský	3:46
Total length:			47:20

=== Official releases ===
- 1980: Modus, LP, MC, OPUS, #9113 0974
- 2008: Slnečný kalendár: 2CD Collectors Edition, bonus CD, OPUS, #91 2792
