= Cirkusový kôň =

Single by Marika Gombitová

from the album Môj malý príbeh
- B-side: "Deň letí"
- Released: 1980
- Recorded: 1980
- Genre: Pop rock
- Length: 4:52
- Label: OPUS (#9143 0539)
- Songwriters: Ján Lauko; Kamil Peteraj
- Producer: Ján Lauko

Marika Gombitová singles chronology
"Svet stromov" (1980)	"Cirkusový kôň" (1980)	"Chcem sa s tebou deliť" (1981)

Audio sample
- file; help

"Cirkusový kôň" (English: Circus Horse) is a song by Marika Gombitová, released on single by OPUS in 1980.

The composition was written by Ján Lauko and Kamil Peteraj, while released next year on album Môj malý príbeh (1981). B-side of the single featured "Deň letí", which was composed by Gombitová herself.

== Official versions ==
1. "Cirkusový kôň" - Studio version, 1980

== Credits and personnel ==
- Marika Gombitová - lead vocal, music
- Ján Lauko - music
- Kamil Peteraj - lyrics
- OPUS Records - copyright
