= Záhradná kaviareň =

- The band members shown from left to right: Ján Lehotský, Karol Morvay, Ján Hangoni, Anastasios (Alexis) Engonidis.

Studio album by Modus
- Released: 1983
- Recorded: 1980/83
- Genre: Big beat; pop
- Length: 39:44
- Label: OPUS LP (#9113 1346); CC(#9913 0180)
- Producer: Ján Lauko

Modus chronology
99 zápaliek (1981)	Záhradná kaviareň (1983)	Najlepšie dievčatá (1984)

Singles from Modus
- 1. "Tajomstvo hier" 2. "Zrkadlo rokov" 3. "Záhradná kaviareň"/"Aký som"

Záhradná kaviareň (English: Garden Café) is the fourth studio album by Modus, released on OPUS in 1983.

== Track listing ==
All tracks are written by Lehotský and Peteraj.

No.	Title	Featured artist(s)	Length
1.	"Spomínanie"	Ján Lehotský	4:35
2.	"Sveták"	Lehotský	4:34
3.	"Záhradná kaviareň"	Marika Gombitová	3:53
4.	"Ranné dvojhry"	Lehotský	3:01
5.	"Zrkadlo rokov"	Lehotský	4:13
6.	"Tajomstvo hier"	Lehotský and Gombitová	4:38
7.	"Medové srdce"	Lehotský	3:48
8.	"Haliere"	Lehotský and Gombitová	4:45
9.	"Keď nastúpia veteráni"	Lehotský	2:12
10.	"Sťahovák"	Lehotský	4:05
Total length:			39:44

== Official releases ==
- 1983: Záhradná kaviareň, LP, MC, OPUS, #9113 1346

== Credits and personnel ==
- Ján Lehotský – lead vocal, chorus, writer, keyboards
- Marika Gombitová – lead vocal, chorus
- Ján Hangoni - lead guitar, chorus
- Anastasios (Alexis) Engonidis - bass guitar, chorus
- Karol Morvay - drums, chorus
- Kamil Peteraj – lyrics
- Ján Lauko – producer
- Jozef Hanák – sound director
- Alan Pajer – photography
