= 99 zápaliek =

Studio album by Modus
- Released: 1981
- Recorded: April/July 1981
- Genre: Big beat; pop
- Length: 38:50
- Label: OPUS (#9113 1215)
- Producer: Ján Lauko

Modus chronology
Balíček snov (1980)	99 zápaliek (1981)	Záhradná kaviareň (1983)

Singles from Modus
- 1. "Spoluhráčka"/"Stará kára"

99 zápaliek (English: 99 matches) is the third studio album by Modus, released on OPUS in 1981.

== Track listing ==
All tracks are written by Lehotský and Peteraj, unless stated otherwise.

No.	Title	Featured artist(s)	Length
1.	"Inferno"	Ján Hangoni	3:34
2.	"Spoluhráčka"	Ján Lehotský	3:24
3.	"Dotyk"	Marika Gombitová	5:10
4.	"Stanica Srdce"	Lehotský	3:54
5.	"Zmrzlinár s bielou čapicou"	Lehotský	3:54
6.	"Pozhasínané"	Lehotský and Karol Morvay	4:17
7.	"Stará kára"	Lehotský	3:34
8.	"99 zápaliek"	Lehotský	3:35
9.	"Zimný park"	Lehotský and Gombitová	3:09
10.	"Čierny drozd"	Lehotský	4:19
Total length:			38:50

99 zápaliek: Komplet 4 (Bonus Tracks)
No.	Title	Writer(s)	Length
11.	"Belasé ráno"	Lehotský; Filan	4:14
12.	"Jeseň"	Lehotský; Filan	3:58
13.	"Prší"	Lehotský; Filan	2:51
14.	"Prvý sneh"	Lehotský; Filan	3:29
15.	"Zo všetkých slov"	Lehotský; Filan	4:47
Total length:			58:09

== Official releases ==
- 1981: 99 zápaliek, LP, MC, OPUS, #9113 1215
- 2000: 99 zápaliek: Komplet 4, (5 bonus tracks), CD, Sony Music Bonton, #45 5361

== Credits and personnel ==
"Dotyk" by Marika Gombitová

- Ján Lehotský – lead vocal, chorus, writer, keyboards
- Ján Hangoni – lead vocal, solo guitar, chorus
- Marika Gombitová – lead vocal, chorus
- Karol Morvay – lead vocal, drums
- Anastasios (Alexis) Engonidis – bass, chorus
- Kamil Peteraj – lyrics
- Ján Lauko – producer
- Štefan Danko – responsible editor
- Ivan Kostroň – photography
- Jozef Hanák – sound director
- Boris Filan – lyrics (bonus tracks 11–15)

== Accolades ==
99 zápaliek was ranked 37th in the list of the 100 Greatest Slovak Albums of All Time.
