= Balíček snov =

Studio album by Modus
- Released: 1980
- Recorded: 1980
- Genre: Big beat; pop
- Length: 45:34
- Label: OPUS (#9116 0999)
- Producer: Ján Lauko

Modus chronology
Modus (1979)	Balíček snov (1980)	99 zápaliek (1981)

Singles from Modus
- 1. "Mágovo číslo"/"Naposledy"

Back cover

Balíček snov (English: The Packet of Dreams) is the second studio album by Modus, released on OPUS in 1980.

== Track listing ==
All tracks are written by Lehotský and Peteraj, except for tracks 4 (Lehotský and Filan) and 6 (Lehotský)

No.	Title	Featured artist(s)	Length
1.	"Mágovo číslo"	Ján Lehotský	4:18
2.	"Balíček snov"	Lehotský and Marika Gombitová	5:20
3.	"Neprichádzaš"	Lehotský and Gombitová	4:47
4.	"Ja a ty"	Lehotský	4:36
5.	"Lásky idú"	Lehotský	3:55
6.	"Stratený sen"	Miroslav Žbirka	3:38
7.	"Ruleta"	Gombitová	3:06
8.	"Báječní muži na lietajúcich strojoch"	Gombitová	3:23
9.	"Pacient"	Lehotský	5:20
10.	"Blúdim"	Gombitová	3:32
11.	"Naposledy"	Lehotský	3:39
Total length:			45:34

== Official releases ==
- 1980: Balíček snov, LP, MC, OPUS, #9116 0999
- 1999: Balíček snov: Komplet 3, re-release, CD, Bonton Music Slovakia, #49 4191

== Credits and personnel ==
- Ján Lehotský - lead vocal, chorus, keyboards, piano, Fender piano, Hohner piano, Hohner strings, Polymoog, Micromoog
- Marika Gombitová - lead vocal, chorus
- Miroslav Žbirka - lead vocal, chorus
- Július Kinček - notes
- Ladislav Lučenič - lead, acoustic and bass guitars, chorus
- Viliam Pobjecký - lead guitar
- Cyril Zeleňák - drums
- Miroslav Jevčák - drums
- Pavol Kozma - drums
- Dušan Hájek - drums
- Ján Lauko - producer
- Peter Smolinský - sound director
- Štefan Danko - responsible editor
- Peter Breza - photography
- Ivan Kostroň - photography
