= Ján Lehotský =

Slovak singer and composer (born 1947)

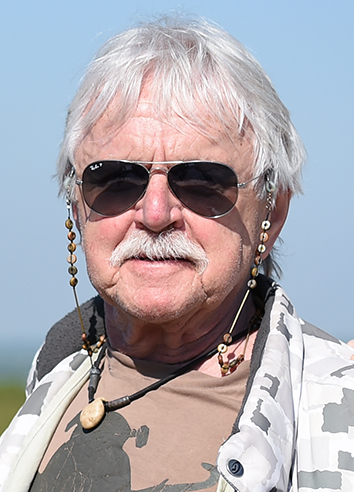

Background information
- Also known as: Janko Lehotský
- Born: 16 April 1947 (age 78); Bratislava, ČSR
- Genres: Pop rock
- Labels: OPUS, Bonton
- Website: Lehotsky-Modus.szm.com

Ján, also credited as Janko Lehotský (born 16 April 1947) is a Slovak composer and former leader of the Modus band.

Lehotský began his performing career when he was four years old, when he performed in a marionette theater. He was a freelance composer during the Velvet Revolution. In 1974 he began managing the band Modus, in which performed also Marika Gombitová and Miroslav Žbirka. He created about 20 records in his career. His music has drawn similarities to Kenny G and he tries to make music that makes people feel good.

== Discography ==
Solo

- 1992: Janko Lehotský a priatelia, OPUS
- 1996: Čiernobiely svet, OPUS
- 2000: Poslední a prví, Universal
- 2002: Láv sa píše "Love", Universal
- 2003: Balíček tónov – Volume 1 (Instrumental), Millenium
- 2005: Nahé dotyky, Johnny
- 2007: Najkrajšie piesne, OPUS
- 2007: Janko Lehotský a priatelia, 2CD, OPUS
- 2008: Balady: Stalo sa nestalo, OPUS
- 2010: Sám, Robert Pospiš & Martin Sillay
