= Opus Records =

Czechoslovak record label

Opus
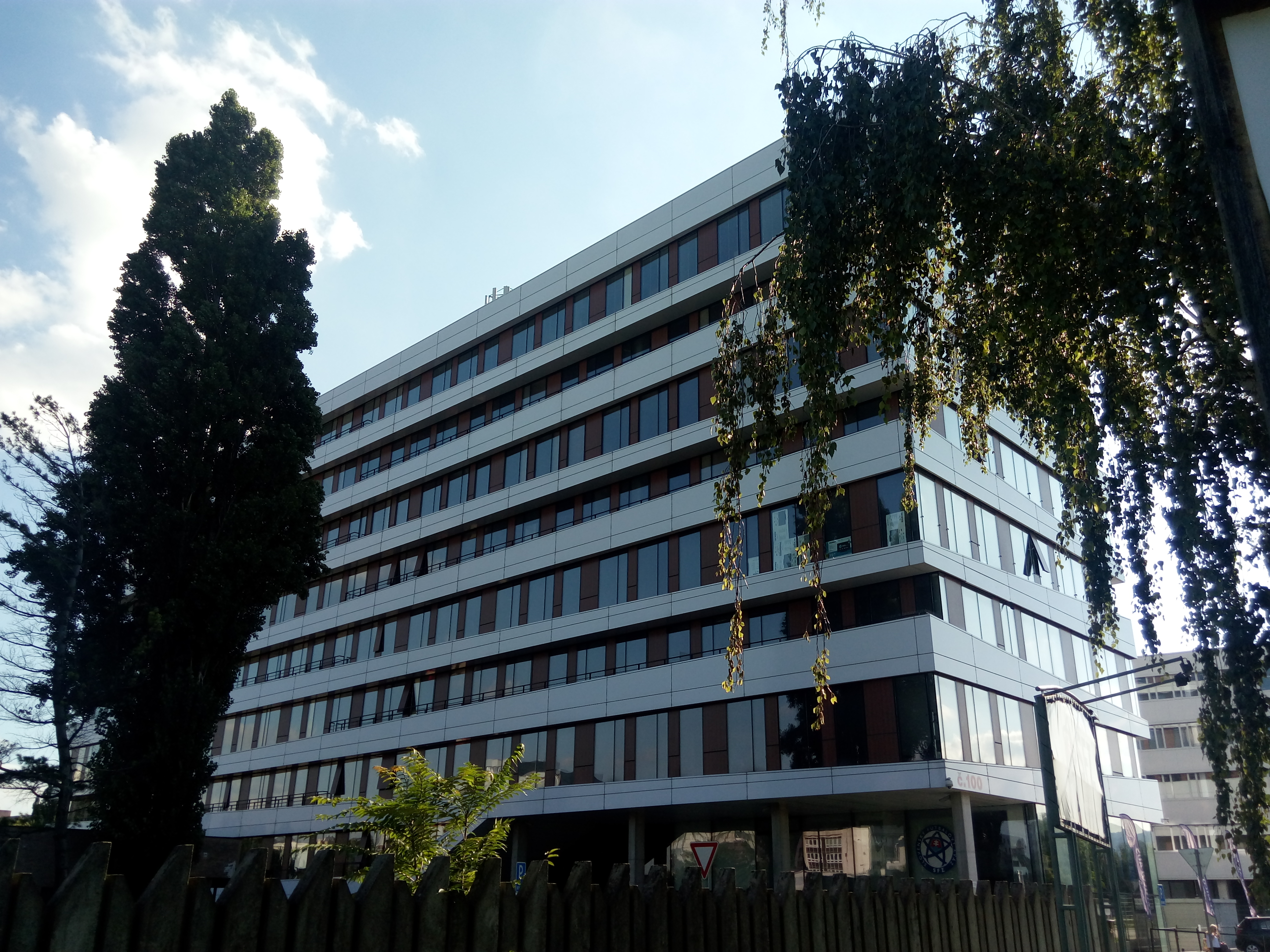
- Opus headquarters in Bratislava
- Parent company: Warner Music Group
- Founded: 1971
- Founder: Supraphon
- Status: Active
- Genre: Various
- Country of origin: Czechoslovakia
- Location: Bratislava
- Official website: opus.sk

Opus is a Slovak state-owned record label and music publishing house based in Bratislava, now known as Opus a.s..

== Background ==
Opus was founded in 1971 and spun off as the Slovak division of music label Supraphon. As such, it was the first Slovak record label. It was privatized in 1990 and purchased by Forza Music s.r.o. in 2005. When Warner Music Group acquired Forza in 2019, they expected to revive the Opus label for pop, rock, and children's music. The label is active to this day and operates under the name Opus a.s.

In addition to Slovak, and later Czech, artists and bands, the label also published works by foreign artists from countries including Poland, Hungary, East Germany, Yugoslavia, and Greece.

== Notable artists ==
- Modus
- Marika Gombitová
- Beáta Dubasová
- Peter Nagy
- Elán
- Miroslav Žbirka
- Alla Pugacheva
- Richard Müller
- Dara Rolins
- Tublatanka
- Vašo Patejdl
- Ján Lehotský
- Lojzo
- Team
- Pavol Hammel
- Metalinda
- Jaroslav Filip
- Collegium Musicum
- Dežo Ursiny
