= List of awards and nominations received by Marika Gombitová =

Marika Gombitová awards
Totals
Award	Wins	Nominations
Bratislavská lýra	4	6
Grand Prix Rádio	0	3
Hit storočia	1	3
Internationales; Schlagerfestival	1	1
Intervision	1	1
Melodie	1	2
Mladé rozlety	1	1
OTO	2	5
Pop Music; Top Slovakia	0	2
POPulár	5	9
Slovenka	1	1
Slávik	2	44
ZAI	1	2
Zlatá nota	2	2
Video awards	6	13
100 Greatest; Slovak Albums	0	11
Certifications	10	10
Other honors	8	8
Awards won	46
Nominations	124

Slovak recording artist Marika Gombitová has received numerous awards and accolades in recognition of her success in the music industry. At the turn of the 3rd millennium, she was named The Songstress of the Century, and her achievements in the music genre has made others to call her "The First Lady of Slovak Pop Music", respectively. As of 2016, she has accumulated a total of 124 awards and/or nominations, and her list also includes a number of music recording sales certifications.

Her double win at the Bratislavská lýra with "Študentská láska" became a significant milestone in her solo career in 1978, which later led to the award's Silver in 1979 and Bronze equivalent in 1980 (the first for "Vyznanie", while the second for her duet "Tajomstvo hier" with Lehotský). Prior to surviving a car accident, she was bestowed an Intervision award from the East European International Radio and Television Organisation in response to her live performance of songs "Vyznanie" and "Chcem sa s tebou deliť"; accomplished in Sopot, Poland in 1980. Besides, her signature song — "Vyznanie" — won the countrywide competition run by Slovak public television network in 2007 as The Hit of the Century.

In a career spanning more or less three decades, Gombitová has sold more than million solo albums during the vinyl era. On March 2, 1996, she became the first female performer, so well one of the first inductees ever to be inducted into the Hall of Fame by Grand Prix ZAI academics. She also holds the record as the artist with the most releases listed in The 100 Greatest Slovak Albums of All Time. Six of her solo studio albums were ranked as some of those best, and the overall index features also her vocal contribution to additional nominated albums (such as co-recorded with Modus and Žbirka, or delivered for Neberte nám princeznú soundtrack).

Aside from her critical accomplishments, Gombitová has been frequently voted in national annual music polls, namely Zlatý slavík and its subsequent equivalents, i.e. Slovenský slávik and Slávik. While eventually winning two editions (1997–98), she topped eight times (1980, 1982–83, 1998, 2000–02, 2005) as the second Most Popular Female Singer in the country, despite showing no particular interest in accepting these recognitions. For her other cultural and/or lifetime achievements, she is also a recipient of the Main Prize by the Culture Ministry of the Czechoslovakia (1986), Freedom of the City (2007) of her birth municipality, as well of the town of Stropkov (2013) and, among others, The Woman of the Year title (2008) and the Hall of Fame OTO Award.

== Music awards ==
=== Bratislavská lýra ===
Bratislavská lýra (English: Bratislava Lyre) was an annual festival of popular songs in former Czechoslovakia, established in 1966 in Bratislava. Two competitions were held; the category of Czechoslovak songwriters and the international contest. Winners were awarded by a golden, silver and/or bronze Lyre (depending on a position). Special prizes included Audience Choice, Journalists Choice, and Lifetime Achievement award. Gombitová won seven awards - three golden lyres (1977–78), one of silver (1979) and bronze (1980), plus an Audience Choice award (1977).

Year	Nominated work	Category	Result	Ref
1977	"Úsmev" with Modus	Contest of the Czechoslovak Authors	Gold	
1977	"Úsmev" with Modus	Audience Choice	Won	
1978	"Študentská láska"	International Contest	Gold	
1978	"Študentská láska"	Contest of the Czechoslovak Authors	Gold	
1979	"Vyznanie"	Contest of the Czechoslovak Authors	Silver^{[A]}	
1980	"Tajomstvo hier" with J.Lehotský	Contest of the Czechoslovak Authors	Bronze^{[B]}	

Notes

- A The Gold Award won Lešek Semelka with "Šaty z šátků" (co-written by Pavel Vrba), while the Bronze went to Valérie Čižmárová ("Žádný ptáčník nemá křídla").
- B The Gold Award won Marcela Králová ("Monogram D+M"), followed by Silver Elán (for "Kaskadér").

=== Grand Prix Rádio ===
Grand Prix Rádio (GPR) was an airplay award established in 1999, originally by three major radio stations in Slovakia. Fun Rádio, Rádio Twist and RockFM. The following years, additional regional stations joined the project as well. The annual show took place in Slovenský rozhlas, Studio 5, and included one and half long gala concert permitted live by all involved radios. Apart from the Grand Prix award for the Most Played Song, winners of the rest categories were voted by listeners of involved radios. Gombitová was nominated at least three times (1999, 2001 and 2003).

Year	Nominated work	Category	Result	Ref
1999	Herself	People's Choice - Female Singer	Nominated^{[C]}	
2000	Herself	People's Choice - Female Singer	—N/a	—
2001	Herself	People's Choice - Female Singer	Nominated^{[C]}	
2002	Herself	People's Choice - Female Singer	—N/a^{[C]}	—
2003	Herself	People's Choice - Female Singer	Nominated^{[D]}	
2004	Herself	People's Choice - Female Singer	No	—

Notes

- C Jana Kirschner won in 1999, 2001 and 2002.
- D In 2003, won Misha.

=== Internationales Schlagerfestival Dresden, Germany ===
Internationales Schlagerfestival Dresden (English: International Pop Festival in Dresden) was a German music festival (1971–1988). It was usually held in September and/or October for five days and the annual event took place at the Kulturpalast Dresden. The main prize was "Grand Prix", including Gold, Silver and/or Bronze medals. Among others, also other awards were bestowed, such as the Price of the Press Jury, and Audience Award. Gombitová received an award at the occasion of the 7th edition of the fest (in 1978).

Year	Nominated work	Category	Result	Ref
1978	"Studentenliebe"	Price of the State Committee for Radio at the CM GDR	Won	

=== Intervision ===
Since 1977 Intervision Song Contest (ISC), originally known as Sopot International Song Festival (Sopot ISF), was organized by the International Radio and Television Organisation, an Eastern network of radio and television broadcasting companies. Unlike its equivalent, the Eurovision (ESC), Intervision often changed formulas to pick a winner, running different competitions at the same time. The festival was held at Forest Opera in Sopot, Poland, and Gombitová won one award (1980).

Year	Nominated work	Category	Result	Ref
1980	"Vyznanie"/"Chcem sa s tebou deliť"	Best Vocal Performance	Won^{[E]}	

Notes

- E The First Prize in the category representing record companies shared Gombitová with Nikolai Gnatiuk ("Dance on a Drum") from Russia. Grand Prix '80 award won Marion ("Where Is the Love?") from Finland.

=== Melodie ===
Melodie was a modern music magazine (similarly to American Billboard) established in 1963 as a monthly periodical in Czechoslovakia. For the time of being a bi-weekly rival entitled as Aktuality Melodie, also known as Áčko, was effective (1969–70). The magazine itself survived almost three decades, ceasing its operations in 1991. Gombitová was awarded in the 4th edition of Tip Melodie as the Best Female Singer (1979), while being nominated in the Zlatá nota^{[H]} category in addition (1987).

Year	Nominated work	Category	Result	Ref
1979	Herself	Tip Melodie - Best Female Singer	Won	
1987	"Neznámy pár" with K.Gott	Zlatá nota - Best Performer	# 7^{[F]}	
1987	"Neznámy pár" with K.Gott	Zlatá nota - Best Performer	# 8^{[F]}	

Notes

- F The category recognized as Zlatá nota (however, NOT to be confused with a different award of the same name by Smena na nedeľu) was shared with Gott, as a result of their common duet. The artists were, therefore, ranked at number #7, respectively #8.

=== ZAI Awards ===
ZAI Awards (later rebranded for Aurels) are the leading music awards in Slovakia, originally established by Zväz autorov a interprétov populárnej hudby (ZAI) to recognize outstanding achievements in the local music industry for the previous calendar year, as an equivalent to the American Gramies. After becoming a Hall of Fame-inductee in 1995, Gombitová was nominated for the Best Female Vocal Performance in 2001.

Year	Nominated work	Category	Result	Ref
ZAI Awards
1995	Herself	Hall of Fame	Inducted	
Aurel Awards
2001	Herself	Best Female Vocal Performance	Nominated^{[G]}	

Notes

- G Won Katarína Knechtová, while the second nominee was Jana Kirschner.

== Video music awards ==
=== Chvíľa pre pesničku ===
Chvíľa pre pesničku (English: The Moment for a Song) was one of the Slovak first TV music programs, in which either artists, or upcomers themselves competed by presenting their songs. The others popular (with no live audience, though) were Chose a Song (1967–76), A Chance for the Talented (1976–83), Six Plus One (1979–83) and/or 5 x P (1983–87). Gombitová entered the show in November 1976 with two compositions.

Year	Nominated work	Category	Result	Ref
1976	"Túto pieseň spievam vám"	—	Nominated	
1976	"Lúčenie"	—	Nominated	

=== Vyberte si pesničku ===
Vyberte si pesničku (English: Choose a Song) was another of television music series created by Slovak Television. It ran from 1967 until 1976. Gombitová appeared in December edition of 1976.

Year	Nominated work	Category	Result	Ref
1976	"Ty vieš, mama"	—	Nominated	

=== Našich 9 ===
Našich 9 (English: Top 9 for Us) was a successor to Vyberte si pesničku TV chart, which was effective from 1975 to 1979. Gombitová topped the show with a duet that featured Janko Lehotský (1978).

Year	Nominated work	Category	Result	Ref
1978	"Letná pieseň"	—	Nominated	
1978	"S tou nádejou choď spať" with J.Lehotský	—	Won	

=== 6 + 1 ===
Year	Nominated work	Category	Result	Ref
1982	"Tichá dohoda" with J.Lehotský	—	Nominated	
1982	"Prelietavý"	—	Nominated	
1982	"Tridsať stupňov v tieni"	—	Nominated	

=== 5 x P ===
5 x P, respectively Päť pekných pesničiek pre potešenie (English: Five Nice Songs for a Pleasure) was the most successful video program, amongst similar music programs (such as Našich 9 as above) televised in Slovakia. The TV hitparade was broadcast monthly, featuring each edition ten songs, which competed along with two new videos extra. Gombitová won a People's Choice award in 1984.

Year	Nominated work	Category	Result	Ref
1984	"Muž Nula"	—	Won	

=== Zlatý triangel ===
Zlatý triangel (English: Golden Triangle) was an annual video chart also broadcast by the public television network Slovenská televízia from 1984 to 1997. The show, originally hosted by Tatiana Kulíšková and Pavol Juráň, and since November 1989 by Daniel Junas, awarded exclusively Slovak and Czech artists for the best videos released in a calendar year, similarly as the MTV music channel. Prior to that, its monthly editions called Triangel were held. Gombitová won four annual charts (in 1985-86, 1988 and 1995).

Year	Nominated work	Category	Result	Ref
1985	"Zem menom láska"	—	Won	
1986	"Chlapci v pasci"	—	Won	
1988	"Koloseum"	—	Won	
1995	"Paradiso"	—	Won	

== Music polls ==
=== The 100 Greatest Slovak Albums of All Time ===
In 2007, Nový čas daily compiled a list of The 100 Greatest Slovak Albums of All Time.^{[H]} The survey was compiled by prominent authors, record producers, professional reviewers and music publishers, who evaluated Slovak full-length records released from 1967 until 2006. Gombitová entered the list, being nominated with six studio albums of her own, as well as for two albums that she recorded with Modus band. The soundtrack Neberte nám princeznú along with two Žbirka's albums, to which she contributed, were also present. Eventually, she scored the highest ranking with her debut set (#20).

Year	Nominated work	Category	Result	Ref
2007	Doktor Sen by M.Žbirka	—	# 19	
2007	Dievča do dažďa	—	# 20	
2007	Neberte nám princeznú	—	# 27	
2007	Mince na dne fontán	—	# 30	
2007	99 zápaliek with Modus	—	# 37	
2007	Modus with Modus	—	# 41	
2007	Ateliér duše	—	# 43	
2007	Slnečný kalendár	—	# 49	
2007	Voľné miesto v srdci	—	# 66	
2007	№5	—	# 75	
2007	Modrý album by M.Žbirka	—	# 86	

Notes

- H The survey won Zvoňte, zvonky album by Prúdy from 1969.

=== Český slavík ===
Český slavík (English: Czech Nightingale) is a successor of the Zlatý slavík's poll, restored in 1996 in the Czech Republic. Starting 1999, as a result of a new business sponsorship by the Carlsbad Mineral Water company, the show was renamed to Český slavík Mattoni. In 2008, the poll was extended by the Slavík bez hranic (English: No Limits Nightingale) category, which awards artists from Slovakia. Gombitová peaked at number #3 (in 2010).

Year	Nominated work	Category	Result	Ref
2008	Herself	People's Choice - Slovak Artist and/or Band	# 7	
2009	Herself	People's Choice - Slovak Artist and/or Band	# 8	
2010	Herself	People's Choice - Slovak Artist and/or Band	# 3	
2011	Herself	People's Choice - Slovak Artist and/or Band	# 8	
2012	Herself	People's Choice - Slovak Artist and/or Band	# 8	
2013	Herself	People's Choice - Slovak Artist and/or Band	# 9	
2014	Herself	People's Choice - Slovak Artist and/or Band	# 6	
2015	Herself	People's Choice - Slovak Artist and/or Band	# 6	
2016	Herself	People's Choice - Slovak Artist and/or Band	# 4	

=== Diskoslavík ===
Diskoslavík (English: DiscoNightingale) was an attempt in behalf of major Czechoslovak disc jockeys to award artists for best acts also on the disco music field. The award was voted by DJs on fifty major discoteques. Gombitová appeared in the 88's volume, reaching the highest score as the 3rd Best Female Singer.

Year	Nominated work	Category	Result	Ref
1988	Herself	Best Female Singer	# 3^{[I]}	
1988	Herself	Best Singer of All-time	# 5	
1988	"Vyznanie"	Best Song of All-time	# 6	

Notes

- I The female category won Iveta Bartošová, followed by Petra Janů as the second in 1988.

=== Hit storočia ===
Hit storočia (English: Hit of the Century) was a national TV competition organized by Slovenská televízia. Within its three-month run (beginning on April 20, 2007), the viewers voted live via text messaging service the most popular Slovak songs from the 1930s to the 1990s. Overall, nine songs performed by current artists were picked to compete in the Finale evening (July 6, 2007). Gombitová entered the show with three compositions, winning with her significant track written by Janko Lehotský and Kamil Peteraj from 1979.

Year	Nominated work	Category	Result	Ref
2007	"Vyznanie"	Hit of the Century	Won^{[J]}	
2007	"V slepých uličkách" with M.Žbirka	Hit of the Century	Nominated	
2007	"Koloseum"	Hit of the Century	Nominated	

Notes

- J The title won scoring 30.4% (i.e. over 60,000 SMSs) votes in total. The rest Top 3 positions featured "V slovenských dolinách" by Karol Duchoň (at #2), and "Voda čo ma drží nad vodou" by Jožo Ráž.

=== Mladé rozlety ===
Mladé rozlety^{[K]} established by the poet Ivan Štrpka was a color magazine intended for teenagers and the youth. After two sampler issues, the periodical was released weekly since January 1987, and in the 90's renamed as M-Report. Apart from music polls, the magazine also organized a national contest of Slovak amateur bands. Gombitová won one poll (1988).

Year	Nominated work	Category	Result	Ref
1988	Ateliér duše	Best Album	Won	

Notes

- K Mladé rozlety was also the name of a Slovak punk group (formed in May 1988 as one of the first of its kind in the country).

=== OTO Awards ===
OTO Awards is a television poll, in which viewers vote the most favorite personalities as well as programmes. The annual show, established in 2000 by Art Production Agency (APA), is screened live by the national television Slovenská televízia. Gombitová peaked one poll (2001), topping in addition at number #2 (2005), and at #3 (2000) as the Most Popular Female Singer. Most recently, she was inducted into the Hall of Fame OTO.

Year	Nominated work	Category	Result	Ref
2000	Herself	Female Singer	# 3^{[L]}	
2001	Herself	Female Singer	Won	
2005	Herself	Female Singer	Runner-up^{[M]}	
2014	Herself	Female Singer	Nominated	
2014	Herself	Hall of Fame OTO	Honored	

Notes

- L The first edition in 2000 won Jana Kirschner, followed by Katarína Hasprová.
- M In 2005, Zuzana Smatanová won the award. The third was ranked Jana Kirschner.

=== Pop Music Top Slovakia ===
Pop Music Top Slovakia was a short-term pool formed as a Slovak equivalent for the former Zlatý slavík. However, the Top 10 survey promoted by regional radio stations, consisted of one general category that awarded singers and bands at the same time. Gombitová entered two editions of the pool at least - in 1992 and 1995.

Year	Nominated work	Category	Result	Ref
1992	Herself	—	# 5^{[N]}	
1993	Herself	—	—N/a	—
1994	Herself	—	—N/a	—
1995	Herself	—	# 4^{[O]}	

Notes

- N The first position earned TEAM, followed by Elán (#2), Metalinda (#3) and Gombitová (at #4 as the only female). Additional positions occupied Peter Nagy (#6), Robo Grigorov (#7), Miroslav Žbirka (#8), Money Factor (#9) and Hex band (#10).
- O 1995 edition topped Maduar, followed by Pavol Habera (#2), Tublatanka (#3), herself, Salco (#5), Elán (#6), Team (#7), Gladiator (#8), Exil (#9) and AYA (#10).

=== POPulár ===
POPulár was a Slovak music magazine that mapped the domestic and international music scene, maintaining also POP awards. The magazine was published monthly since 1970, until its termination in 1992 (Note: In July 2008, the magazine was restored by Nový Populár, issued twice a month). Gombitová won four times as the Best Female Singer (1983, 1986, 1987-8) and once she received the Best Album award (1987).

Year	Nominated work	Category	Result	Ref
1983	Herself	Best Female Singer	Won	
1986	Herself	Best Female Singer	Won^{[P]}	
1986	Herself	Best Celebrity	# 4	
1986	Voľné miesto v srdci	Best Album	# 4	
1987	Herself	Best Female Singer	Won	
1987	Herself	Best Celebrity	Runner-up	
1987	Ateliér duše	Best Album	Won	
1987	"Koloseum"	Best Song	Runner-up	
1988	Herself	Best Female Singer	Won	

Notes

- P The second scored Iveta Bartošová and Beáta Dubasová at number #3.

=== Slávik ===
Similarly in 1998, the rival Slávik (English: Nightingale) was established by the FORZA company against the Oklamčák's. After an agreement in 1999, the official promoter of the poll in Slovakia became FORZA in collaboration with Oklamčák Production. The annual awards were permitted live by the CME network Markíza. Gombitová entered each of to date thirteen editions, topping the highest five times at number #2 (1998, 2000–02, 2005), and two times at number #3 (1999, 2006).

Year	Nominated work	Category	Result	Ref
1998	Herself	People's Choice - Female Singer	Runner-up	
1999	Herself	People's Choice - Female Singer	# 3	
2000	Herself	People's Choice - Female Singer	Runner-up	
2001	Herself	People's Choice - Female Singer	Runner-up	
2002	Herself	People's Choice - Female Singer	Runner-up	
2003	Herself	People's Choice - Female Singer	# 4	
2004	Herself	People's Choice - Female Singer	# 5	
2005	Herself	People's Choice - Female Singer	Runner-up	
2006	Herself	People's Choice - Female Singer	# 3	
2007	Herself	People's Choice - Female Singer	# 4	
2008	Herself	People's Choice - Female Singer	# 4	
2009	Herself	People's Choice - Female Singer	# 6	
2010	Herself	People's Choice - Female Singer	# 7	
2011	Herself	People's Choice - Female Singer	# 9	
2012	Herself	People's Choice - Female Singer	# 10	

=== Slovenský slávik ===
In Slovakia, Slovenský slávik (English: Slovak Nightingale) was primarily set up as an equivalent to the federal Zlatý slavík awards, respectively the Český. However, the poll was revived in 1997 by Jozef Oklamčák, founder of the Oklamčák Production agency, the project failed due to a boycott of the artists themselves, and a certain level of controversy that followed subsequently. Prior to its early termination in 1999, Gombitová won both editions as the Most Popular Singer (1997–98).

Year	Nominated work	Category	Result	Ref
1997	Herself	People's Choice - Female Singer	Won^{[Q]}	
1998	Herself	People's Choice - Female Singer	Won	

Notes

- Q According to the representatives of two major labels in Slovakia (Peter Riava from PolyGram, and Juraj Čurný from BMG Ariola ČR/SR), the polls promoter Jozef Oklamčák presented different results, originally. Apart from others, the main awards were supposed to be passed to Pavol Habera as Best Male Singer and Barbara Haščáková for Best Female Singer. However, as a result of the Oklamčák "revenge", both finished at the second positions in return to their refusal to show up on the ceremony. The live show was cancelled, eventually, and the annual awards were announced on TV, using archived videoclips of the nominees.

=== Zlatá nota ===
Zlatá nota was a survey organized by the Smena na nedeľu newspaper whose readers voted their most favorite artists. Gombitová won two annual polls of the periodical (1995 and 1996).

Year	Nominated work	Category	Result	Ref
1995	Herself	People Choice - Female Singer	Won	
1996	Herself	People Choice - Female Singer	Won^{[R]}	

- R On additional positions scored Barbara Haščáková (at #2), respectively Michaela Paštéková (#3).

=== Zlatý slavík ===
Zlatý slavík (English: Golden Nightingale) was a music poll established by magazine Mladý svět in collaboration with Smena na nedeľu in 1962, and broadcast on television. Since the 70's, the entries very frequently falsified by Communist Party of Czechoslovakia (KSČ). The original poll was cancelled in 1991, shortly before dissolution of the Czech and Slovak. The highest number received in the poll's history was 115,000 votes. Gombitová has entered fifteen editions, peaking three times as the second Most Popular Singer (1980, 1982–83), while twice at number #3 (1979, 1981).

Year	Nominated work	Category	Result	Ref
1977	Herself	People's Choice - Female Singer	# 46	
1978	Herself	People's Choice - Female Singer	# 4	
1979	Herself	People's Choice - Female Singer	# 3	
1980	Herself	People's Choice - Female Singer	Runner-up	
1981	Herself	People's Choice - Female Singer	# 3	
1982	Herself	People's Choice - Female Singer	Runner-up	
1983	Herself	People's Choice - Female Singer	Runner-up	
1984	Herself	People's Choice - Female Singer	# 4	
1985	Herself	People's Choice - Female Singer	# 6	
1986	Herself	People's Choice - Female Singer	# 7	
1987	Herself	People's Choice - Female Singer	# 7	
1988	Herself	People's Choice - Female Singer	# 10	
1989	Herself	People's Choice - Female Singer	# 9	
1990	Herself	People's Choice - Female Singer	# 12	
1991	Herself	People's Choice - Female Singer	# 15	

== Music recording sales certifications ==
Music recording sales certification is a system of certifying that a music record has shipped or sold a certain number of copies. The number of sales or shipments required for a Silver, Gold, multi/Platinum, respectively Diamond threshold depends on the population of the territory in which the title is released.

=== ČNS IFPI ===
In Slovakia, the International Federation of the Phonographic Industry for the Czech Republic (ČNS IFPI) awards native artists since the cancellation of the Slovak national section (SNS IFPI) on December 31, 2009. Currently, there are awarded Gold (for 3,000 units), and/or Platinum certifications (for 6,000 units), exclusively for album releases. Gombitová demonstrably won at least seven platinum and three golden awards.

Year	Nominated work	Award	Details		Result	Ref
Year	Nominated work	Award	Format	Sales	Result	Ref
1979	Dievča do dažďa	Unknown	LP	200,000	—N/a	—
1984	Mince na dne fontán	Gold	2LP		Won	
2005	Neberte nám princeznú	Gold	CD	9,000	Won	
2006	Neberte nám princeznú	Platinum	CD	9,000	Won	
2006	Gold	Gold	CD	28,000	Won	
2007	Gold	Platinum	CD	28,000	Won	
2007	Gold	Platinum	CD	28,000	Won	
2007	Gold	Platinum	CD	28,000	Won	
2007	Gold	Platinum	CD	28,000	Won	
2007	Vyznanie	Platinum	2CD	12,000	Won	
2007	Vyznanie	Platinum	2CD	12,000	Won	

== Other honors and achievements ==
=== Čestné občianstvo ===
Čestné občianstvo (English: Freedom of the City) is a civilian honor of a state, usually, that is granted to its natives by the highest ranking local officer. At the occasion of the 440th anniversary since the first historical record about Turany nad Ondavou (MDLXVII), the municipal of the village, Viera Pundžáková, delivered the title to Gombitová by mail service (2007). While most recently, in 2013, the municipal corporation in the town of Stropkov bestowed the artist a similar honor.

Year	Nominated work	Category	Result	Ref
2007	Herself	Freedom of the City — Turany nad Ondavou	Honored	
2013	Herself	Freedom of the City — Stropkov	Honored	

=== Honorific titles ===
Year	Nominated work	Category	Result	Ref
2000	Herself	The Songstress of the Century	Won	

=== Miková Festival of the Rusyns Culture ===
Year	Nominated work	Category	Result	Ref
2013	Herself	Lifetime achievement	Honored	

=== Slovenka Awards ===
Year	Nominated work	Category	Result	Ref
2015	Herself	Special – Lifetime achievement	Honored	

=== Ústí nad Labem ===
At the national contest of musical programs held in Ústí nad Labem Gombitová won two awards. The Main Prize by Ministerstvo kultúry Československé socialistické republiky (MK ČSR) (English: Culture Ministry of the Czechoslovak Socialist Republic), and an Audience Choice award (1986).

Year	Nominated work	Category	Result	Ref
1986	Adresa ja, adresa ty Tour	MK ČSR Main Prize	Won	
1986	Adresa ja, adresa ty Tour	Audience Choice	Won	

=== ÚV SZŽ ===
(ÚV SZŽ) Ústredný výbor Slovenského zväzu žien (English: Central Committee of the Slovak Women Union), later recognized as Demokratická únia žien (English: Democratic Union of the Women), was a female organization, which initially at the occasion of the International Women's Day, on March 8, annually awarded individuals within different areas such as culture and art. Gombitová received a Gold Plaque for the lifetime development of the culture in Slovakia (1988).

Year	Nominated work	Category	Result	Ref
1988	Herself	Gold Plaque	Honored	

=== Žena 21. storočia ===
Since 2007, Žena 21. storočia (English: New Millennium Woman), respectively Žena roka (English: Woman of the Year) is an award bestowed by the periodical Bratislava Leaders Magazine which, in collaboration with the general associate HSBC Bank, awards the most recognized females for their contribution in the previous calendar year. Overall four major categories are held; the Politics and Public Service, the Science and Research, the Art, and the Business. A special category helds the Woman of the 21st Century^{[S]} title (also a statuette of a woman on pedestal, designed by wood-carver Vladimír Morávek). The annual evening is attended by the First Lady of the country, and takes place in the Slovak National Theater. Gombitová was honored by the award in 2008 (April 25).

Year	Nominated work	Category	Result	Ref
2008	Herself	Woman of the Year	Won	

- S The winners of the previous editions were MD Eva Siracká (a founder of the League Against Cancer) and Slovak opera singer Eva Blahová.

== See also ==
- Slovak popular music
- Marika Gombitová discography
- The 100 Greatest Slovak Albums of All Time

== Bibliography ==
- Graclík, Miroslav; Nekvapil, Václav (2008). Marika Gombitová: neautorizovaný životní příběh legendy československé pop music [Marika Gombitová: An Unauthorized Life Story of the Legend of Czechoslovak Pop Music] (in Czech). Prague, Czech Republic: XYZ. p. 446. ISBN 978-80-7388-115-3. OCLC 294939865.
- Lehotský, Oskar (April 23, 2008a). Slovak Popular Music in the Years 1977–1989 – Marika Gombitová (PDF) (in Slovak). Bratislava, Slovakia: Comenius University, Faculty of Arts. Archived from the original (PDF) on July 14, 2014.
- Lehotský, Oskar (April 23, 2008b). Slovak Popular Music in the Years 1977–1989 – Modus (PDF) (in Slovak). Bratislava, Slovakia: Comenius University, Faculty of Arts.
