= Vyznanie (album) =

Compilation album by Marika Gombitová
- Released: 2007
- Genre: Beat; pop rock
- Length: 65:45 (Disc 1); 66:55 (Disc 2)
- Label: Open Music (#91 2784)
- Producer: Ján Lauko; Milan Vašica; Peter Breiner; Peter Smolinský; Miroslav Žbirka

Marika Gombitová chronology
Gold (2005)	Vyznanie (2007)	Na Bratislavskej Lýre (2008)

Singles from Vyznanie
- 1. "Tak som chcela všetkých milovať"

Vyznanie (English: Declaration) is the fifth compilation album by Marika Gombitová, and her second featuring two compact discs. The set was released on OPUS in 2007.

== Track listing ==
All tracks are written by Gombitová and Peteraj, unless stated otherwise.

One
No.	Title	Writer(s)	Length
1.	"Deň ako z pohľadnice" (taken from Dievča do dažďa: Komplet 1)	Lehotský; Laurinc	2:46
2.	"Správne dievča" (taken from Smoliari)	Brezovský; Peteraj	3:00
3.	"Prstienky z trávy" (taken from Diskotéka OPUSu 3)		3:19
4.	"Študentská láska" (taken from Dievča do dažďa: Komplet 1)	Hammel; Peteraj	3:23
5.	"Kufor a šál" (duet with Ján Lehotský, taken from Dievča do dažďa)	Lehotský; Peteraj	3:33
6.	"Vyznanie" (taken from Dievča do dažďa)	Lehotský; Peteraj	4:43
7.	"V slepých uličkách" (taken from Doktor Sen)	Žbirka; Peteraj	4:10
8.	"Šaty" (taken from Neberte nám princeznú)	Ursiny; Štrasser	3:07
9.	"Tri slová" (trio with Miroslav Žbirka and Marie Rottrová, taken from Neberte nám princeznú)	Ursiny; Štrasser	3:02
10.	"Tajomstvo hier" (duet with Lehotský, taken from Môj malý príbeh: Komplet 2)	Lehotský; Peteraj	4:40
11.	"Cirkusový kôň" (taken from Môj malý príbeh)	Lauko; Peteraj	4:52
12.	"Deň letí" (taken from Môj malý príbeh)		2:40
13.	"Územie zázrakov" (taken from Slnečný kalendár)		3:35
14.	"Srdcia dievčat" (taken from Slnečný kalendár)	Lauko; Peteraj	4:03
15.	"Tridsať stupňov v tieni" (taken from Slnečný kalendár)	Lehotský; Peteraj	3:26
16.	"Muž Nula" (taken from Mince na dne fontán)		3:48
17.	"Kúsok šťastia" (taken from Mince na dne fontán)		3:23
18.	"Školská lavica" (taken from Mince na dne fontán)	Lehotský; Peteraj	3:43
Total length:			65:45

Two
No.	Title	Writer(s)	Length
3.	Untitled	Šeban; Peteraj
19.	"Prázdninové tričko" (taken from №5)		3:06
20.	"Crazy" (taken from №5)		4:02
21.	"Korzo chlapčenských myšlienok" (taken from №5)		3:45
22.	"Nenápadná" (taken from Ateliér duše (Bonus tracks))		3:35
23.	"Adresa ja, adresa ty" (taken from Voľné miesto v srdci)		3:41
24.	"Uličník Bozk" (duet with Václav Patejdl, taken from Voľné miesto v srdci)		3:19
25.	"Správne dievčatá" (taken from Voľné miesto v srdci)		4:10
26.	"Chlapci v pasci" (taken from Voľné miesto v srdci)		3:30
27.	"Koloseum" (taken from Ateliér duše)		4:20
28.	"V období dažďa" (taken from Ateliér duše)		3:19
29.	"Neznámy pár" (duet with Karel Gott, taken from Ateliér duše)		4:10
30.	"Babylónia" (taken from Kam idú ľudia?)		5:15
31.	"Dvaja" (taken from Kam idú ľudia?)		3:39
32.	"Paradiso" (taken from Zostaň)		4:18
33.	"Nespáľme to krásne v nás" (duet with Žbirka, taken from Modrý album)	Žbirka; Peteraj	3:22
34.	"Tajnosľubná" (duet with Žbirka, taken from Dúhy)	Žbirka; Peteraj	3:08
35.	"Tak som chcela všetkých milovať" (new track)	Patejdl; Peteraj	4:00
Total length:			66:55

== Official releases ==
- 2007: Vyznanie, 2CD, OPUS #91 2784

== Personnel ==
- Marika Gombitová – lead vocal, writer
- Ján Lehotský – music, lead vocal
- Miroslav Žbirka – music, lead vocal, producer
- Marie Rottrová – lead vocal
- Václav Patejdl – music, lead vocal, producer
- Karel Gott – lead vocal
- Ali Brezovský – music
- Pavol Hammel – music
- Dežo Ursiny – music
- Ján Lauko – music, producer
- Andrej Šeban – music
- Zoro Laurinc – lyrics
- Kamil Peteraj – lyrics
- Ján Štrasser – lyrics
- Milan Vašica – producer
- Peter Breiner – producer
- Peter Smolinský – producer
- Honza Horáček – producer
- Aleš Zenkl – producer

== Charts ==
=== Album ===
Chart (2008)	Peak position
Czech Albums Chart	23

=== Singles ===
Year	Song	Peak positions	
Year	Song	Slovakia	
Year	Song	50	100
2007	"Tak som chcela všetkých milovať"^{[A]}	20	63

Notes

- A "Tak som chcela všetkých milovať" was issued only as a promotional single as the Gombitová's final work by now. In 2008, the composition was in addition remixed by Jarek Šimek.

== Certifications ==
=== ČNS IFPI ===
In Slovakia, the International Federation of the Phonographic Industry for the Czech Republic (ČNS IFPI) awards artists since the cancellation of the Slovak national section (SNS IFPI). Currently, there are awarded Gold (for 3,000 units), and/or Platinum certifications (for 6,000 units), exclusively for album releases. Gombitová demonstrably won at least seven platinum, and three golden awards in total.

Year	Nominated work	Award	Format	Result
2007	Vyznanie	Platinum	2CD	Won
2007	Vyznanie	Platinum	2CD	Won
