= Gold (Marika Gombitová album) =

Compilation album by Marika Gombitová
- Released: 2005
- Recorded: 1979–90
- Genre: Beat; pop rock
- Length: 57:56
- Label: Open Music (#91 2701)
- Producer: Ján Lauko; Milan Vašica; Peter Breiner; Peter Smolinský

Marika Gombitová chronology
V obrazech II (2003)	Gold (2005)	Dúhy (2005)

Alternative cover
- Back cover of the release

Gold is the fourth compilation album by Marika Gombitová, released on OPUS in 2005.

== Track listing ==
All tracks are written by Gombitová and Peteraj, unless stated otherwise.

No.	Title	Writer(s)	Length
1.	"Adresa ja, adresa ty" (taken from Voľné miesto v srdci)		3:41
2.	"Územie zázrakov" (taken from Slnečný kalendár)		3:35
3.	"Koloseum" (taken from Ateliér duše)		4:20
4.	"V období dažďa" (taken from Ateliér duše)		3:19
5.	"Pomätená" (taken from Môj malý príbeh)	Lehotský; Peteraj	4:53
6.	"Chlapci v pasci" (taken from Voľné miesto v srdci)		3:30
7.	"Slnečný kalendár" (taken from Slnečný kalendár)		2:43
8.	"Crazy" (taken from №5)		4:02
9.	"Ži a nechaj žiť" (taken from Ateliér duše)		3:13
10.	"Správne dievčatá" (taken from Voľné miesto v srdci)		4:10
11.	"Kríž" (taken from Kam idú ľudia?)	Šeban; Peteraj	4:53
12.	"Ateliér duše" (taken from Ateliér duše)	Patejdl; Peteraj	3:51
13.	"Zem menom láska" (taken from №5)		3:20
14.	"Školská lavica" (taken from Mince na dne fontán)	Lehotský; Peteraj	3:43
15.	"Vyznanie" (taken from Dievča do dažďa)	Lehotský; Peteraj	4:43
Total length:			57:56

Gold: Komplet 1 (Bonus tracks)
No.	Title	Writer(s)	Featured artist(s)	Length
1.	"Úsmev" (taken from OPUS '77)	Lehotský; Peteraj	Ján Lehotský, Miroslav Žbirka and Miroslav Jevčák	3:27
2.	"Vianočný popevok" (taken from Slávnosť úprimných slov)	Patejdl; Peteraj		2:42
3.	"Snehové sypané" (taken from Slávnosť úprimných slov)	Patejdl; Peteraj	Patejdl, Lehotský and Richard Müller	4:03
Total length:				68:08

== Official releases ==
- 2005: Gold, CD, OPUS #91 2701
- 2008: Gold: Komplet 1, 8CD (box set + 3 bonus tracks), OPUS #91 2724

== Personnel ==
- Marika Gombitová – lead vocal, writer
- Ján Lehotský – music
- Andrej Šeban – music
- Václav Patejdl – music
- Kamil Peteraj – lyrics
- Ján Lauko – producer
- Milan Vašica – producer
- Peter Breiner – producer
- Peter Smolinský – producer
- Ján Červenka – remastering
- Tibor Borský – photography
- Master Vision – design

== Charts ==
Chart (2005)	Peak position
Czech Albums Chart	15

== Certifications ==
=== ČNS IFPI ===
In Slovakia, the International Federation of the Phonographic Industry for the Czech Republic (ČNS IFPI) awards artists since the cancellation of the Slovak national section (SNS IFPI). Currently, there are awarded Gold (for 3,000 units), and/or Platinum certifications (for 6,000 units), exclusively for album releases. Gombitová demonstrably won at least seven platinum, and three golden awards in total.

Year	Nominated work	Award	Format	Result
2006	Gold	Gold	CD	Won
2007	Gold	Platinum	CD	Won
2007	Gold	Platinum	CD	Won
2007	Gold	Platinum	CD	Won
2007	Gold	Platinum	CD	Won
