= Duetá =

Compilation album by Marika Gombitová
- Released: 2010
- Recorded: 1977–2001
- Genre: Beat; pop rock
- Length: 69:54
- Label: OPUS (#91 2825)
- Producer: Ján Lauko; Milan Vašica; Peter Smolinský; Miroslav Žbirka

Marika Gombitová chronology
Na Bratislavskej Lýre (2008)	Duetá (2010)

Duetá (English: Duets) is the seventh compilation album by Marika Gombitová, released on OPUS in 2010.

== Track listing ==
All tracks are written by Lehotský and Peteraj, unless stated otherwise.

No.	Title	Writer(s)	Featured artist(s)	Length
1.	"V slepých uličkách" (taken from Doktor Sen)	Žbirka; Peteraj	Miroslav Žbirka	4:02
2.	"Neznámy pár" (taken from Ateliér duše)	Gombitová: Peteraj	Karel Gott	4:22
3.	"S tou nádejou choď spať" (previously unreleased)	Lehotský; Filan	Ján Lehotský	3:16
4.	"Nobelova cena za lásku" (taken from On a Ona)	Varga; Hammel; Filan	Pavol Hammel	3:14
5.	"Tajná šťastná hviezda" (taken from Smoliari)	Brezovský; Peteraj	Žbirka	3:05
6.	"Balíček snov" (taken from Balíček snov)		Lehotský	5:20
7.	"Tajnosľubná" (taken from Dúhy)	Žbirka; Peteraj	Žbirka	3:08
8.	"Kufor a šál" (taken from Dievča do dažďa)		Lehotský	3:38
9.	"Tajomstvo hier" (taken from Záhradná kaviareň)		Lehotský	4:40
10.	"Uličník bozk" (previously unreleased)	Gombitová; Peteraj	Róbert Grigorov	3:19
11.	"Neprichádzaš" (taken from Balíček snov)		Lehotský	4:47
12.	"Amori" (taken from On a Ona)	Varga; Hammel; Filan	Ľudovít Nosko	2:55
13.	"Keď zametú" (taken from Môj malý príbeh)		Lehotský	4:12
14.	"Nespáľme to krásne v nás" (taken from Modrý album)	Žbirka; Peteraj	Žbirka	3:22
Total length:				53:18

Bonus tracks (trios nd quartets)
No.	Title	Writer(s)	Featured artist(s)	Length
15.	"Modus" (taken from Modus)		Lehotský and Žbirka	2:47
16.	"Slávnosť úprimných slov" (taken from Slávnosť úprimných slov)	Patejdl; Gombitová; Peteraj	Václav Patejdl and Lehotský	3:16
17.	"Snehové sypané" (taken from Slávnosť úprimných slov)	Patejdl; Peteraj	Patejdl, Lehotský and Richard Müller	4:03
18.	"Tri slová" (taken from Neberte nám princeznú)	Ursiny; Štrasser	Žbirka and Marie Rottrová	3:03
19.	"Úsmev" (taken from OPUS '77)		Lehotský, Žbirka and Miroslav Jevčák	3:27
Total length:				69:54

== Official releases ==
- 2010: Duetá, CD, OPUS #91 2825

== Credits and personnel ==
- Marika Gombitová - lead vocal, writer
- Miroslav Žbirka - music, lead vocal, co-producer
- Karel Gott
- Ján Lehotský - music, lead vocal
- Pavol Hammel - music, lead vocal
- Marián Varga - music
- Róbert Grigorov - lead vocal
- Ľudovít Nosko - lead vocal
- Václav Patejdl - music, lead vocal
- Richard Müller - lead vocal
- Dežo Ursiny - music
- Marie Rottrová - lead vocal
- Miroslav Jevčák - lead vocal
- Kamil Peteraj - lyrics
- Boris Filan - lyrics
- Ali Brezovský - lyrics
- Ján Štrasser - lyrics
- Ján Lauko - producer
- Milan Vašica - producer
- Peter Smolinský - producer
