= Na Bratislavskej Lýre =

2008 compilation album by Marika Gombitová

Compilation album by Marika Gombitová
- Released: 2008
- Recorded: 1977–1985
- Genre: Beat; pop rock
- Length: 40:59
- Label: OPUS (#91 0016)
- Producer: Ján Lauko; Milan Vašica

Marika Gombitová chronology
| Vyznanie (2007) | Na Bratislavskej Lýre (2008) | Duetá (2010) |

Alternative cover
- Back cover of the release

Na Bratislavskej Lýre (English: At the Bratislava Lyre) is the sixth compilation album by Marika Gombitová, released on OPUS in 2008.

== Track listing ==
All tracks are written by Lehotský and Peteraj, unless stated otherwise.

| No. | Title | Writer(s) | Featured artist(s) | Length |
|---|---|---|---|---|
| 1. | "Úsmev" (taken from OPUS '77) | | Ján Lehotský, Miroslav Žbirka and Miroslav Jevčák | 3:28 |
| 2. | "Deň ako z pohľadnice" (taken from OPUS '77) | Lehotský; Laurinc | | 2:48 |
| 3. | "Študentská láska" (taken from OPUS '78) | Hammel; Peteraj | | 3:25 |
| 4. | "Dievčatá" (taken from OPUS '78) | | Modus | 2:24 |
| 5. | "Vyznanie" (taken from Dievča do dažďa) | | | 4:46 |
| 6. | "Malý veľký vlak" (taken from Modus) | | Žbirka and Modus | 3:40 |
| 7. | "Svet stromov" (taken from Môj malý príbeh) | | | 5:13 |
| 8. | "Tajomstvo hier" (taken from Záhradná kaviareň) | | Lehotský | 4:41 |
| 9. | "Prstienky z trávy" (taken from Diskotéka OPUSu 3) | Gombitová; Guldan | | 3:19 |
| 10. | "Cukráreň na dlani námestia (Live '85)" (previously unreleased) | Lauko; Peteraj | | 7:07 |
| Total length: | | | | 40:59 |

== Official releases ==
- 2008: Na Bratislavskej Lýre, CD, OPUS, #91 0016

== Credits and personnel ==
- Marika Gombitová - lead vocal, writer
- Ján Lehotský - music, lead vocal
- Miroslav Žbirka - lead vocal
- Miroslav Jevčák - lead vocal
- Pavol Hammel - music
- Ján Lauko - music, producer
- Kamil Peteraj - lyrics
- Zoro Laurinc - lyrics
- Peter Guldan - lyrics
- Modus - chorus
- Milan Vašica - producer
