= Car crash of Marika Gombitová =

Coordinates: 48°49′12″N 16°52′56″E

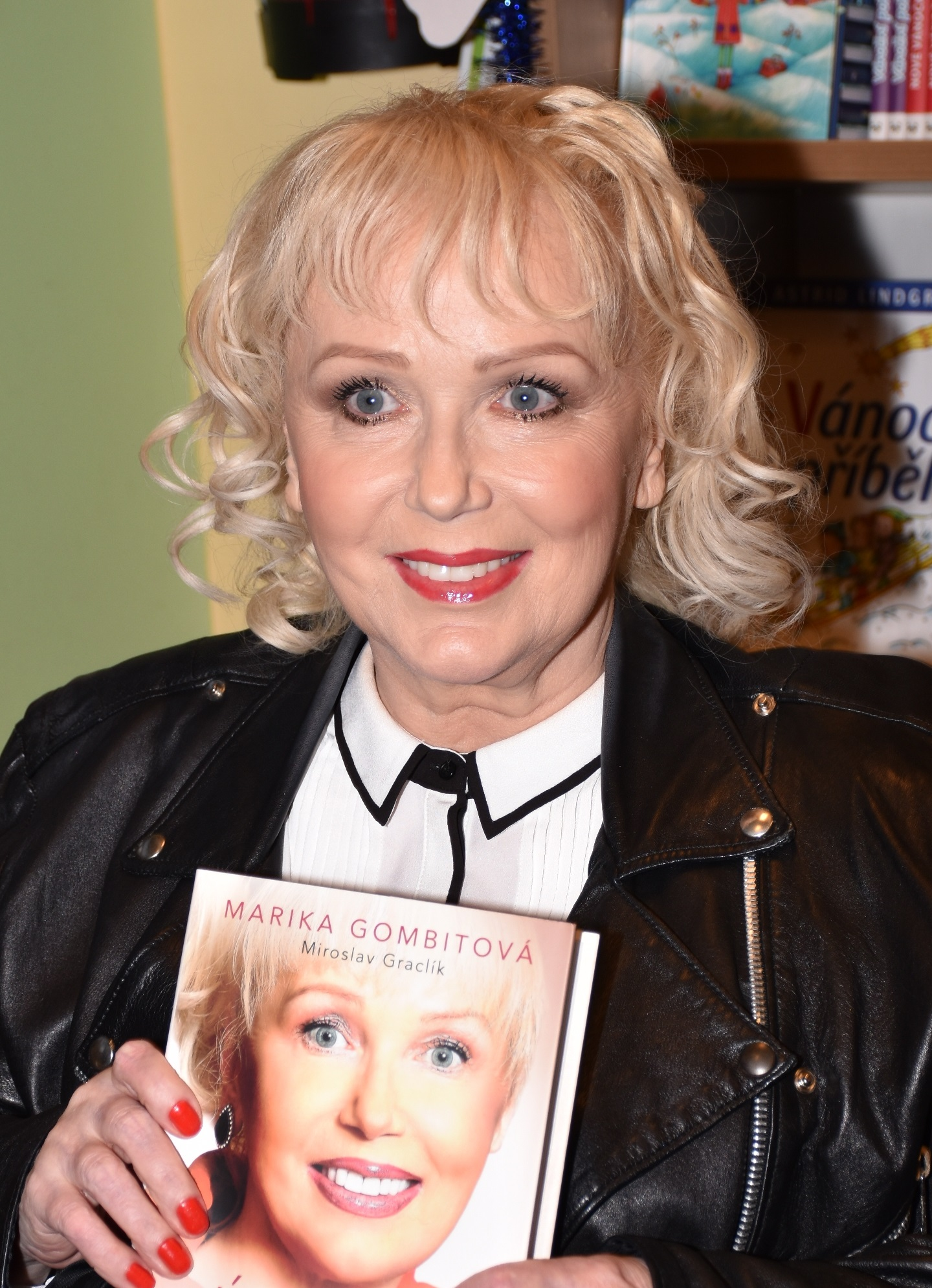
- Singer in Prague, 2016.
- Date: December 1, 1980
- Location: 43rd km of D1 motorway near Podivín, Břeclav District, South Moravian Region, CSSR
- Participants: Andrea B (driver); Marika Gombitová
- Outcome: Driver convicted of assault causing bodily harm

Marika Gombitová (born September 12, 1956, in Turany nad Ondavou, Czechoslovakia) is a Slovak singer-songwriter who began her career as a female vocalist in the band Modus in the late 1970s.

Besides gaining fame for her subsequent solo career, she also became known as the victim of a single-vehicle collision on December 1, 1980, alleged to have been caused by reckless driving by Andrea B. Although she survived, Gombitová sustained irreparable injuries to her backbone and spinal cord and, as a result, is paralyzed from the 7th vertebral notch downwards, and was hence reliant on a wheelchair. After a six-month recovery, the physically disabled artist returned to the spotlight, achieving new top rankings on the music charts and even touring again.

Few details of the Gombitová's car crash and its subsequent investigation have been made public and, therefore, the circumstances of the issue remain the subject of controversy.

== Crash ==
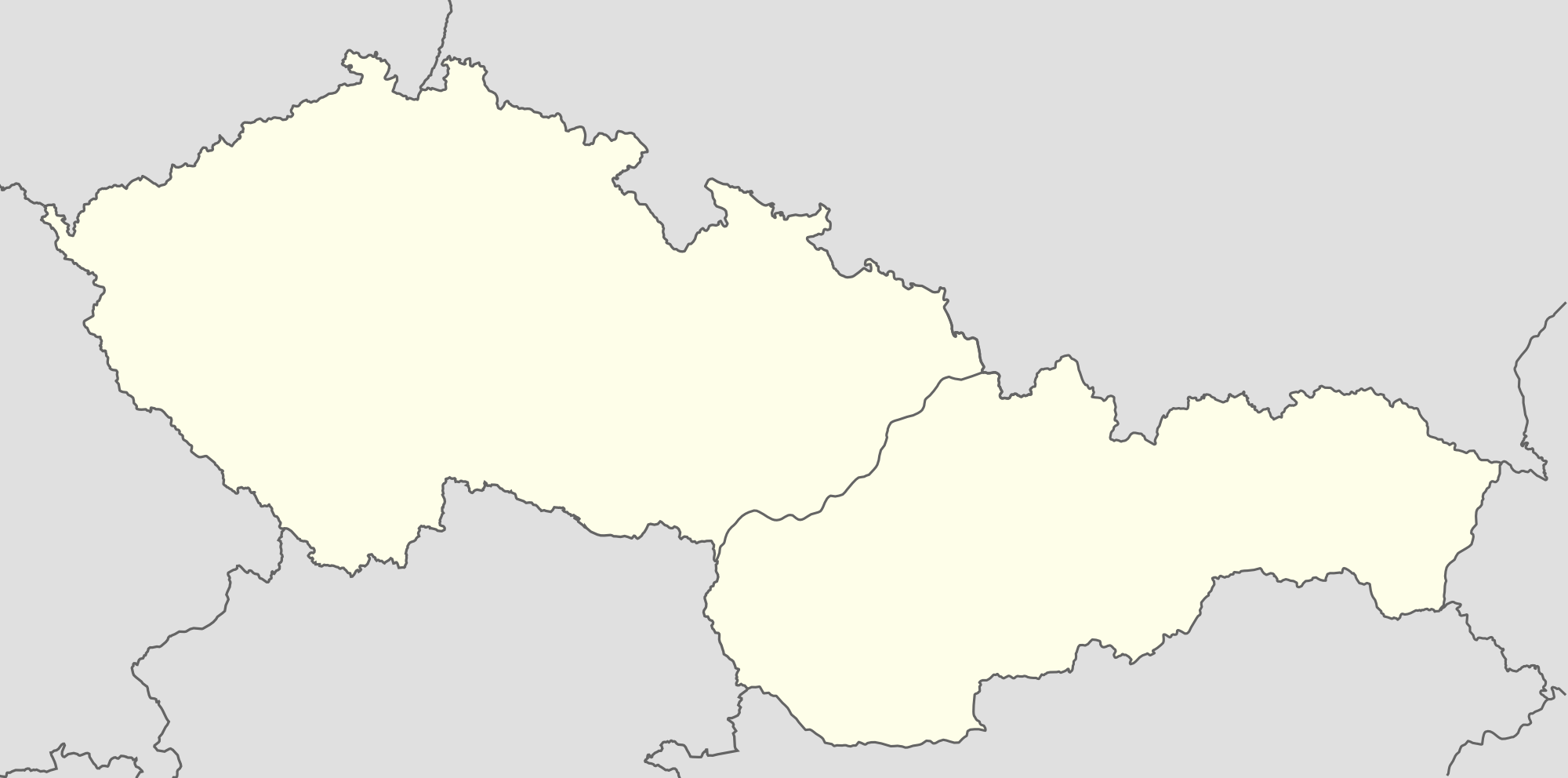
Car crash of Marika Gombitová (Czechoslovakia)

=== Background ===
On Sunday, November 30, 1980, Modus were to perform their final concert with their original lineup, which featured Ján Lehotský, Miroslav Žbirka, Gombitová, Ladislav Lučenič and Dušan Hájek. The concert was planned to take place in the premises of a former club called ZK ROH Zbrojovka, located in Brno-Židenice, Czechoslovakia. Gombitová had called Lehotský earlier, complaining of feeling unwell and hoping to excuse herself from the event, but in spite of this, she joined the group as scheduled.

According to the Slovak newspaper Nový čas, which tried to reconstruct sequence of events in the new millennium, Žbirka confirmed that he had left the location in a Škoda 1000 MB along with Lučenič, and probably also with another person. Lehotský is reported to have been in his own car, accompanied by Hájek, and Gombitová was in a Renault 5 owned and driven by her 21-year-old friend known as Andrea B, reportedly from West Germany. The cars set out from Brno separately around midnight, taking different routes to Bratislava.

=== December 1, 1980 ===
At approximately 1:00 am on December 1, 1980, the automobile carrying Gombitová went into a skid at the 43rd km of the recently opened D2 motorway, between Podivín and Břeclav. The vehicle spun around, made a few somersaults and ended up on its roof in a field. While the driver, Andrea B, was only slightly injured, the trapped artist had to be extricated from the wrecked car by the rescue crew, sustaining severe multiple injuries, including spinal cord injuries, fractured ribs, sternal fracture, broken backbone and a broken little finger. Allegedly still conscious, Gombitová was rushed to the nearest hospital in Hustopeče, while Andrea B was interrogated by police patrol officers from the SNB.

=== Aftermath ===
Paralyzed from the 7th vertebral notch downwards, Gombitová lost function over two-thirds of her body, even losing the use of the lower part of her lungs. She was diagnosed with acute pneumonia and transported to the Slovak Hospital Kramáre in her home town. After four months spent mostly at the local neurosurgery department, she was taken in April 1981 to the Rehabilitation Institute of Kladruby, now in the Czech Republic. Her rehabilitation later continued in the German spa town Bad Wildungen and, back in Czechia, in Karlovy Vary. In 1982, Gombitová underwent major surgery in Moscow, Russia, but with no significant impact on her mobility.

== Trial ==
The case was examined by the Highway patrol in Podivín, which shredded all available files and photographs after ten years, in accordance with internal regulations.

A judicial investigation reportedly concluded that the crash was caused by Andrea B, who lost control of the car at high speed. Andrea B was, therefore, convicted of assault causing bodily harm and sentenced to prison. However, it is not known whether she actually went to prison, as she immediately left the country. Newspapers report that, at the court, she defended herself for exceeding the speed limit by claiming that her visa was set to expire at midnight on Sunday, November 30, 1980.

== Impact ==
=== Reactions ===
The Communist Party of Czechoslovakia (KSČ) imposed an embargo on the case on grounds of national interest. There was a delay of two days before the public was informed of the crash in an initial report in the daily newspaper Mladá fronta on December 3, 1980. The newspaper gave details confirming the critical condition of the singer and identified the driver of the vehicle as "21 years old Andrea B from West Germany", who would not adapt her speed to the snowy road surface. The article also reported that the Brno police had launched a prosecution against the "foreign citizen".

As all official reports had been discarded in the meantime, later mass media speculated that the crash could have been caused by reckless driving, drunk driving, or both. Although personally identifiable information related to Andrea B remains undisclosed, Nový čas described the driver as an attractive blonde, possibly working in the fashion industry, and said they could not guess where she had disappeared to. The Czech authors of Gombitová's 2008 biography, however, described Andrea B as "a receptionist at a luxury hotel, to which Gombitová was reportedly invited through the [art agency] Slovkoncert". Other sources, such as Modus band's sound engineer Andrej Andrašovan, referred to the Renault's driver as a native-born citizen of Switzerland whose car had a German registration plate. On the other hand, Milan Drobný, a fellow Czech singer, referred to Andrea B as "that Austrian or German."

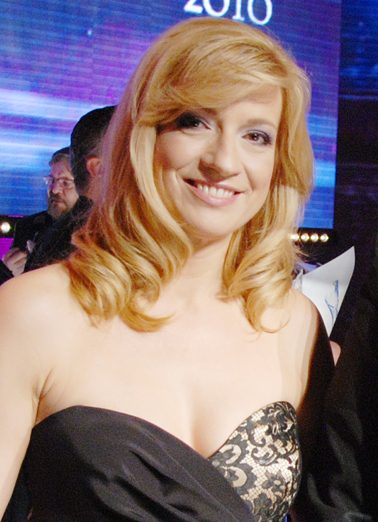
Hargašová ran the talk show between the years 2000–2002.

=== Nočné lampy interview ===
In December 2000, Gombitová unexpectedly appeared in Nočné lampy ("Night Lamps"), a former late night talk show produced by CEM network Markíza. The 40-minute television program, hosted by Jarmila Hargašová (pictured right), invited celebrity guests who had been involved in extraordinary situations. Gombitová probably agreed to appear on the show because of the positive reception for her new song "Prosba" ("Appeal"), which had been preceded by a six-year absence. For the first time in twenty years since her crash, the singer talked about her life openly in front of television cameras. Her crucial collaborators were also present at the interview, such as Modus ex-members Lehotský and Žbirka, and her past songwriters Kamil Peteraj, Pavol Hammel and Marián Varga.

After a 15-minute introduction, during which Gombitová discussed her temporary comeback and rise to prominence, the conversation turned to her crash. When finally asked to recall that date, she responded with:

I remember that day, even though it makes me sad thinking of it or when I'm questioned about it. I remember that night, well, that afternoon when I called Janko [Lehotský], I mean by phone, that I didn't feel well and [I] didn't want to go to the concert, if there's something [he] could do about it. Of course there wasn't, there was a concert in Brno, so we went. It was very bad weather, I can remember that. But after the concert, there was so much sadness in the dressing room, because then, well, Meky [Žbirka] announced, I mean, that he's done with Janko and is leaving with Laco [Lučenič] to make a solo band. And I, actually, didn't know who I belonged to. It was a very sad moment ... point in time. Well then, Janko didn't make a comment on anything and I, I didn't know, I mean, whether I'm staying with Janko or whom in fact. And that's how we actually split up, said good-byes and went home. And well then, what happened just happened. That's how I recall it. I don't know, guys, if they want to have their say. I see it like this.

Lehotský did not comment on it. Žbirka confirmed that the weather was bad that day and highlighted the band's sense of professional responsibility to perform that evening. He eventually added "that highway had in fact been impassable." During the rest of the interview, Gombitová talked about the subsequent events that led to her hospitalization, rather than reconstructing the incident itself. Neither Andrea B nor the relationship between them was mentioned in any way in the publicly released version of the pre-filmed show. Hargašová said that she had visited Gombitová at home to discuss various topics in advance twice: the first time about one year before the talk show, and the second time one day prior to that. In an interview published in SME on May 18, 2001, host admitted that, shortly before filming the TV show, Gombitová asked her not to go public about the subjects they discussed in advance in private.

External videos
- Marika Gombitová – Nočné lampy

== See also ==
- List of traffic collisions (1700–1999)
- List of awards and nominations received by Marika Gombitová
- Marika Gombitová discography

== Bibliography ==
- Graclík, Miroslav; Nekvapil, Václav (2008). Marika Gombitová: neautorizovaný životní příběh legendy československé pop music [Marika Gombitová: An Unauthorized Life Story of the Legend of Czechoslovak Pop Music] (in Czech). Prague, Czech Republic: XYZ. p. 446. ISBN 978-80-7388-115-3. OCLC 294939865.
- Lehotský, Oskar (April 23, 2008). Slovenská populárna hudba v rokoch 1977-1989 Piesňový repertoár Mariky Gombitovej [Slovak Popular Music in the Years 1977–1989 – Marika Gombitová] (PDF). Comenius University, Faculty of Arts (Thesis) (in Slovak). Archived from the original (PDF) on July 14, 2014.
- Lehotský, Oskar (February 6, 2008). Slovenská populárna hudba v rokoch 1977-1989 Modus – úvodná štúdia [Slovak Popular Music in the Years 1977–1989 – Modus] (PDF). Comenius University, Faculty of Arts (Thesis) (in Slovak). Archived from the original (PDF) on August 19, 2011.
