= Koloseum =

- A screenshot of the official music video

Song by Marika Gombitová

from the album Ateliér duše
- Language: Slovak
- Released: 1987
- Genre: Pop
- Length: 5:33
- Label: OPUS
- Songwriters: Marika Gombitová; Kamil Peteraj
- Producer: Peter Smolinský

Audio sample
- "Koloseum": file; help

Music video
- "Koloseum" on YouTube

"Koloseum" (English: Coliseum) is a song by Marika Gombitová released on OPUS in 1987.

The composition, written by the singer herself with lyrics by Kamil Peteraj, is considered one of her most recognized works, earning several awards and nominations in addition. The POPulár award for the 2nd Best Video (1987) and the annual Zlatý Triangel award as Best Video (1988).

Its music video (directed by Ladislav Kaboš) featured on the VHS compilation Ateliér duše, released in 1987 on Videofilm SFT Koliba.

== Official versions ==
1. "Koloseum" - Studio version, 1987

== Credits and personnel ==
- Marika Gombitová - lead vocal, writer
- Vašo Patejdl - piano, keyboards, LinnDrum computer, chorus
- Kamil Peteraj - lyrics
- Juraj Burian - electric and acoustic guitar
- Andrej Šeban - electric guitar
- Michal Důžek - chorus
- Peter Penthor - chorus
- Štefan Danko - responsible editor
- Peter Smolinský - producer
- Juraj Filo - sound director
- Jozef Krajčovič - sound director
- Ivan Minárik - technical coordination

== Awards ==
=== POPulár ===
POPulár was a Slovak music magazine that mapped the domestic and international music scene, maintaining also POP awards. The magazine was published monthly since 1970, until its termination in 1992 (Note: In July 2008, the magazine was restored by Nový Populár, issued twice a month). Gombitová won four times as the Best Female Singer (1983, 1986, 1987-8), and once she received the Best Album award (1987).

Year	Nominated work	Category	Result
1987	Koloseum	Best Song	Runner-up

=== Triangel ===
Zlatý Triangel (English: Golden Triangle) was an annual video chart also broadcast by the public television network Slovenská televízia from 1984 to 1997. The show, originally hosted by Tatiana Kulíšková and Pavol Juráň, and since November 1989 by Daniel Junas, awarded exclusively Slovak and Czech artists for the best videos released in a calendar year, similarly as the MTV music channel. Prior to that, its monthly editions called Triangel were held. Gombitová won four annual charts in total (in 1985-86, 1988 and 1995).

Year	Nominated work	Category	Result
1988	"Koloseum"	Best Video	Won

=== Hit storočia ===
The Hit storočia (English: Hit of the Century) was a national TV competition organized by Slovenská televízia. Within its three-month run (set of on 20 April 2007), the viewers voted live the most popular Slovak songs from the 1930s to 1990s. Overall, nine songs were picked to compete in the Finale evening (6 July 2007). Gombitová entered the show with three songs, winning with a song written by Janko Lehotský and Kamil Peteraj, "Vyznanie" from 1979.

Year	Nominated work	Category	Result
2007	Koloseum	Hit of the Century	Nominated

== Cover versions ==
- 2006: Pavol Hammel, Robo Grigorov and Miko Hladký featuring Sláčikový orchester
- 2007: Martina Schindlerová

== See also ==
- Marika Gombitová discography
- Marika Gombitová awards
