= S tou nádejou choď spať =

Song performed by Marika Gombitová, Ján Lehotský

- A screenshot of the official music video

Song by Marika Gombitová and Janko Lehotský
- Language: Slovak
- Released: 1978
- Genre: Pop music
- Length: 3:16
- Label: OPUS
- Songwriters: Janko Lehotský; Boris Filan

Audio sample
- "S tou nádejou choď spať": file; help

"S tou nádejou choď spať" (English: Turn In Hoping) is a duet by Marika Gombitová and Janko Lehotský, originally recorded in 1978.

The song, written by Lehotský and Boris Filan, topped on the Slovak TV hitparade Našich 9 (English: The Ours 9) in 1978. However, for the first time, being released in 2010 on the Gombitová's duets compilation Duetá issued by OPUS.

== Official versions ==
- 1978: "S tou nádejou choď spať" - original version

== Credits and personnel ==
- Marika Gombitová - lead vocal
- Janko Lehotský - lead vocal, writer
- Boris Filan - lyrics
- Modus - band

== Awards ==
=== Našich 9 ===
Našich 9 (English: Five Nice Songs For Pleasure) was one of the Slovak TV music programs, in which either artists, or upcomers themselves competed by presenting their songs. The show ran from 1975 to 1979, and the others popular also were Chose a Song (1967–76), A Chance for the Talented (1976–83), 6+1 (1979–83), and 5xP. S tou nádejou choď spať peaked the television show in 1978.

Year	Nominated work	Category	Result
1978	"S tou nádejou choď spať"	Top 9 for Us	Won

== Cover version ==
- 2007: Janko Lehotský & Gabriela Škrabáková (released on Priatelia a čiernobiely svet by Lehotský)
