= Chcem sa s tebou deliť =

Single by Marika Gombitová

from the album Sopot 80
- B-side: "Výmeny"
- Released: 1981
- Recorded: 1980
- Genre: Beat
- Length: 3:16
- Label: OPUS (#9143 0545)
- Songwriters: Janko Lehotský; Kamil Peteraj

Marika Gombitová singles chronology
"Cirkusový kôň" (1980)	"Chcem sa s tebou deliť" (1981)	"Srdcia dievčat" (1982)

Audio sample
- file; help

"Chcem sa s tebou deliť" (in English transcribed as "I Wanna Share with You") is a song by Slovak singer Marika Gombitová, released on OPUS in 1981.

The composition was written by Janko Lehotský in common with Kamil Peteraj, appearing at the 4th Intervision Song Festival contest in Sopot, Poland in 1980, where it won (along with "Why?") the first prize for the Best Performance in the category representing record companies.

Most recently, the single was for the first released in digital format, on the singer's second album re-release entitled Môj malý príbeh: Komplet 2. B-side of the single featured "Výmeny".

== Official versions ==
1. "Chcem sa s tebou deliť" - Studio version, 1980
2. "Chcem sa s tebou deliť" - Live version, 1980

== Credits and personnel ==
- Marika Gombitová - lead vocal
- Janko Lehotský - music
- Kamil Peteraj - lyrics
- OPUS - copyright

== Awards ==
=== Intervision ===
Intervision Song Contest (ISC), originally known as Sopot International Song Festival (Sopot ISF), was organized by the International Radio and Television Organisation, an Eastern network of radio and television broadcasting companies. Unlike its equivalent, the Eurovision (ESC), Intervision often changed formulas to pick a winner, running different competitions at the same time. The festival was held at Forest Opera in Sopot, Poland, and Gombitová won one award (1980).

Year	Nominated work	Category	Result
1980	"Vyznanie" "Chcem sa s tebou deliť"	Best Performance	Won^{A}

Notes

- ^{A} The First Prize in the category representing record companies shared Gombitová with Nikolai Gnatiuk ("Dance on a Drum") from Russia. Grand Prix '80 award won Marion ("Where Is the Love?") from Finland.
