= Kufor a šál =

Single by Marika Gombitová and Janko Lehotský

from the album Dievča do dažďa
- B-side: "Nostalgia" (by Gombitová)
- Released: 1980
- Recorded: 1979
- Genre: Pop rock
- Length: 3:33
- Label: OPUS (#9143 0521)
- Songwriters: Janko Lehotský; Kamil Peteraj
- Producers: Ján Lauko; Milan Vašica

Marika Gombitová singles chronology
"Vyznanie" (1979)	"Kufor a šál" (1980)	"Domy na zbúranie" (1980)

Audio sample
- "Kufor a šál": file; help

"Kufor a šál" (English: A Suit and a Scarf) is a song by Marika Gombitová and Janko Lehotský released on OPUS in 1980.

The single, written by Janko Lehotský and Kamil Peteraj, was taken from the Gombitová's debut album Dievča do dažďa (1979). An international version of the song was entitled "I'm Flying" in English, and attached to the singer's export album Rainy Day Girl.

B-side of the single featured "Nostalgia", a solo track by Gombitová, also from her debut set.

== Official versions ==
1. "Kufor a šál" - Original version, 1979
2. "I'm Flying" - International version, 1980

== Credits and personnel ==
- Marika Gombitová – lead vocal
- Janko Lehotský – lead vocal, writer, keyboards
- Ladislav Lučenič – bass guitar, backing vocal
- Cyril Zeleňák – drums, percussion
- František Griglák – solo guitar, synthesizer
- Viliam Pobjecký – solo guitar
- Kamil Peteraj – lyrics
- Ján Lauko – producer
- Milan Vašica – producer
- Ivan Minárik – technical collaboration
- Jozef Hanák – technical collaboration
