= Boľavé námestie =

Single by Marika Gombitová

from the album OPUS '77
- B-side: "Ty vieš, mama"
- Released: 1977
- Recorded: 1977
- Genre: Pop
- Length: 2:52
- Label: OPUS (#9143 0446)
- Songwriters: Janko Lehotský; Vlasta Brezovská

Marika Gombitová singles chronology
"Úsmev" (1977)	"Boľavé námestie" (1977)	"Študentská láska" (1978)

Audio sample
- file; help

"Boľavé námestie" (Sore Square) is the debut solo single by the female singer Marika Gombitová released on OPUS in 1977.

The composition was written by Lehotský and Brezovská, being issued on the various artists compilation OPUS '77. B-side of the single featured "Ty vieš, mama". Both songs were on CD released in 2000 as bonus tracks of the singer's debut album re-release Dievča do dažďa.

== Official versions ==
1. "Boľavé námestie" – Studio version, 1977

== Credits and personnel ==
- Marika Gombitová – lead vocal
- Janko Lehotský – music
- V.Brezovská – lyrics
- OPUS – copyright
