= Srdcia dievčat =

Single by Marika Gombitová

from the album Slnečný kalendár
- B-side: "Slnečný kalendár"
- Released: 1982
- Recorded: 1982
- Genre: Pop
- Length: 4:03
- Label: OPUS (#9143 0561)
- Songwriters: Ján Lauko; Kamil Peteraj

Marika Gombitová singles chronology
"Chcem sa s tebou deliť" (1981)	"Srdcia dievčat" (1982)	"Záhradná kaviareň" (1983)

Audio sample
- "Srdcia dievčat": file; help

"Srdcia dievčat" (Girlie Hearts) is a song by the female singer Marika Gombitová released on OPUS in 1982.

The composition was written by Ján Lauko and Kamil Peteraj, and issued as the pilot single of the singer's studio album Slnečný kalendár (1982).

The single was the first released in digital format from the singer's second album re-release entitled Môj malý príbeh: Komplet 2. The B-side of the single is "Slnečný kalendár".

== Official versions ==
1. "Srdcia dievčat" – Studio version, 1982

== Credits and personnel ==
- Marika Gombitová – lead vocal, music
- Ján Lauko – music
- Kamil Peteraj – lyrics
- OPUS – copyright
