= Zem menom láska =

- A screenshot of the official music video

Song by Marika Gombitová

from the album №5
- Language: Slovak
- Released: 1984
- Genre: Dance-pop
- Length: 3:20
- Label: OPUS
- Songwriters: Marika Gombitová; Kamil Peteraj
- Producer: Peter Breiner

Audio sample
- "Zem menom láska": file; help

Music video
- "Zem menom láska" on YouTube

Zem menom láska (in English transcribed as "The Land with a Name Love") is a song by Marika Gombitová released on OPUS in 1984.

As all the tracks from the singer's fifth studio set №5 (produced by Peter Breiner), Zem menom láska was written by Gombitová in common with Kamil Peteraj as well. In 1985, the music video of the composition topped the annual Zlatý Triangel (English: Golden Triangle) TV chart in Slovakia.

== Official versions ==
1. "Zem menom láska" - Studio version, 1985
2. "Zem menom láska (Live)" - Live version, Nežná revolúcia, 1989

== Credits and personnel ==
- Marika Gombitová - lead vocal, writer
- Peter Breiner - producer, piano, Fender Rhodes, SCI Pro-One, Roland Juno 60, Roland Vocoder, Yamaha DX7, strings conductor, arranger
- Ladislav Lučenič - bass electric guitar, Juno 60, ARP Oddysey
- Kamil Peteraj - lyrics
- Juraj Lehotský - trumpets
- Ľudovít Horský - trumpets
- Pavel Zajaček - trombone
- Tibor Mrázik - trombone
- Ľuboš Stankovský - Simmons drums
- Viliam Vaškovič programmer Roland Drums Computer TR 808,
- Ivan Minárik - programmer ARP Oddysey, SCI Pro-One, Roland Juno 60, Roland Vocoder, sound director, technical collaboration,
- Štefan Danko - responsible editor
- Juraj Filo - sound director

== Awards ==
=== Triangel ===
Zlatý Triangel (English: Golden Triangle) was an annual video chart also broadcast by the public television network Slovenská televízia from 1984 to 1997. The show, originally hosted by Tatiana Kulíšková and Pavol Juráň, and since November 1989 by Daniel Junas, awarded exclusively Slovak and Czech artists for the best videos released in a calendar year, similarly as the MTV music channel. Prior to that, its monthly editions called Triangel were held. In total, Gombitová won four annual charts (in 1985–86, 1988 and 1995).

Year	Nominated work	Category	Result
1985	"Zem menom láska"	Best Video	Won
