= Chlapci v pasci =

- A screenshot of the official music video

Song by Marika Gombitová

from the album Voľné miesto v srdci
- Language: Slovak
- Released: 1986
- Genre: Dance-pop
- Length: 3:30
- Label: OPUS
- Songwriters: Marika Gombitová; Kamil Peteraj
- Producers: Ján Lauko; Peter Smolinský

Audio sample
- "Chlapci v pasci": file; help

Chlapci v pasci (English: Boys in a Trap) is a song by Marika Gombitová released on OPUS in 1986.

The song, written by Gombitová along with her longtime text writer, Kamil Peteraj, became one the clubs favorite from Voľné miesto v srdci album, due to its catchy dancefloor tune. In 1986, the track won the annual Zlatý Triangel (English: Golden Triangle) awards show as Best Video.

In addition, the composition was remixed by Jaroslav Šimek in 2008 for dancefloor and released as a free download single, followed by a Šimek's remix of "V období dažďa".

== Official versions ==
1. "Chlapci v pasci" - Studio version, 1986
2. "Chlapci v pasci (Jaroslav Šimek Remix)" - Remixed version, 2008

== Credits and personnel ==
- Marika Gombitová - lead vocal, writer
- Vašo Patejdl - Roland Jupiter 6, SCI Pro-One, Roland MC 202, Linn Drum
- Gabo Dušík - Roland Juno 60, Yamaha DX 7, Yamaha PF 15, piano
- Ján Szabo - bass
- Štefan Hegedüš - electric and acoustic guitar
- Juraj Varsanyi - Simmons drum
- Marián Jaslovský - tenor saxophone
- Ivan Jombík - programming, Yamaha drum computer RX 11, sound director
- Ján Lauko - producer
- Peter Smolinský - producer
- Štefan Danko - responsible editor

== Awards ==
=== Triangel ===
Zlatý Triangel (English: Golden Triangle) was an annual video chart also broadcast by the public television network Slovenská televízia from 1984 to 1997. The show, originally hosted by Tatiana Kulíšková and Pavol Juráň, and since November 1989 by Daniel Junas, awarded exclusively Slovak and Czech artists for the best videos released in a calendar year, similarly as the MTV music channel. Prior to that, its monthly editions called Triangel were held. In total, Gombitová won four annual charts (in 1985-86, 1988 and 1995).

| Year | Nominated work | Category | Result |
|---|---|---|---|
| 1986 | "Chlapci v pasci" | Best Video | Won |
