= Neberte nám princeznú =

1981 Czechoslovak musical film

- The cover of DVD release
- Directed by: Martin Hoffmeister
- Written by: Martin Hoffmeister; Alta Vášová (libretto)
- Produced by: Karel Dvořák
- Starring: Marika Gombitová; Miroslav Žbirka; Marie Rottrová
- Cinematography: Rudolf Milič
- Music by: Dežo Ursiny; Ján Štrasser (lyrics)
- Production company: STV
- Distributed by: Dikrama
- Release date: 1981
- Running time: 56 minutes
- Country: Czechoslovakia
- Language: Slovak

Neberte nám princeznú (English: Let the Princess Stay with Us) is a modern version of the Snow White and the Seven Dwarfs fairytale, starring Marika Gombitová. The musical was directed by Martin Hoffmeister, and released in 1981.

== Synopsis ==
Girl Katka (Marika Gombitová) is frustrated and restless. She escapes from home and finds herself in the orphanage. Seven orphan boys hide her and call her "Princess". But Katka is soon uncovered and her frantic mother is on the way.

== Credits ==
- Martin Hoffmeister - screenplay
- Alta Vášová - libretto
- Rudolf Milič - cinematography

== Cast ==
- Marika Gombitová as Katka
- Miroslav Žbirka as Katka's boyfriend
- Marie Rottrová as Katka's mother
- Luděk Sobota as Katka's father
- Petr Nárožný as director of children's home
- Mária Hájková as cleaner
- Jozef Vrábel as orphan boy
- Michal Vrábel as orphan boy
- Matúš Cinzer as orphan boy
- Roman Haša as orphan boy
- Ján Kovačič as orphan boy
- Ľudovít Tóth as orphan boy
- Daniel Hassan as orphan boy
- Viera Hladká as teacher
- Hana Talpová
- Jan Kanyza as police officer (VB)

== Gallery ==
The villa belonging to Katka and her parents (actually the Villa of JUDr. Reinhard Turnwald in Liberec)

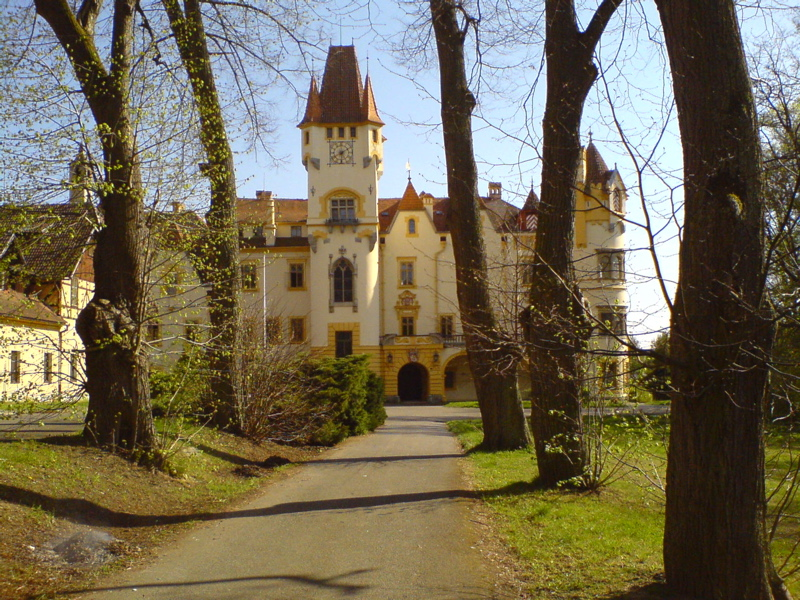
The children's home (actually the Žinkovy Castle)

== Soundtrack ==
Neberte nám princeznú

Soundtrack album by Various artists
- Released: 19 November 2001
- Recorded: 1980
- Genre: Pop
- Length: 35:36
- Label: BMG (#74321 90447)

Marika Gombitová chronology
| Úsmev (1998) | Neberte nám princeznú (2001) | Modrý album (2001) |

Back cover of the release

Neberte nám princeznú is the original picture soundtrack released on BMG on 19 November 2001.

=== Track listing ===
All tracks are written by Dežo Ursiny and Ján Štrasser.

| No. | Title | Performer(s) | Length |
|---|---|---|---|
| 1. | "Dieťa z dobrej rodiny" | Marika Gombitová | 2:42 |
| 2. | "Dieťa z dobrej rodiny II" | Gombitová and Miroslav Žbirka | 1:35 |
| 3. | "Dvaja" | Žbirka | 2:53 |
| 4. | "Som taká, aká som" | Marie Rottrová | 1:51 |
| 5. | "Šaty" | Gombitová | 3:07 |
| 6. | "To ste vy!" | Žbirka | 2:12 |
| 7. | "Svitá" | Gombitová | 2:24 |
| 8. | "Rozhádzané postele" | Children's cast | 2:36 |
| 9. | "Čo nám už rukami prešlo detí" | Children's cast and teachers | 3:50 |
| 10. | "Hľadá sa dievča z dobrej rodiny" | Rottrová and Žbirka | 2:29 |
| 11. | "Budem tu s vami" | Gombitová | 2:32 |
| 12. | "Trochu tuším, trochu viem" | Gombitová | 2:29 |
| 13. | "Teraz pekne pôjdeš domov!" | Rottrová | 1:54 |
| 14. | "Tri slová" | Gombitová, Žbirka and Rottrová | 3:02 |
| Total length: | | | 35:36 |

=== Official releases ===
- 2001: Neberte nám princeznú, CD, BMG, #74321 90447
- 2004: Neberte nám princeznú, DVD, Dikrama, #0014 9331

=== Credits and personnel ===
- Dežo Ursiny - music, guitar, chorus
- Ján Štrasser - lyrics
- Marika Gombitová - lead vocal
- Miroslav Žbirka - lead vocal
- Marie Rottrová - lead vocal
- Pavel Daněk - bass, chorus
- Martin Karvaš - keyboards
- Ľubomír Stankovský - drums, percussion, chorus

=== Charts ===
==== Year-end charts ====
| Chart (2007) | Peak position |
|---|---|
| The 100 Greatest Slovak Albums of All Time | 27 |

=== Sales certifications ===
==== ČNS IFPI ====
In Slovakia, the International Federation of the Phonographic Industry for the Czech Republic (ČNS IFPI) awards artists since the cancellation of the Slovak national section (SNS IFPI). Currently, there are awarded Gold (for 3,000 units), and/or Platinum certifications (for 6,000 units), exclusively for album releases. Gombitová demonstrably won at least seven platinum, and three golden awards in total.

| Year | Nominated work | Award | Format | Result |
|---|---|---|---|---|
| 2005 | Neberte nám princeznú | Gold | CD | Won |
| 2006 | Neberte nám princeznú | Platinum | CD | Won |

== See also ==
- Marika Gombitová discography
- Marika Gombitová awards
- The 100 Greatest Slovak Albums of All Time
