= Turany nad Ondavou =

- Municipality
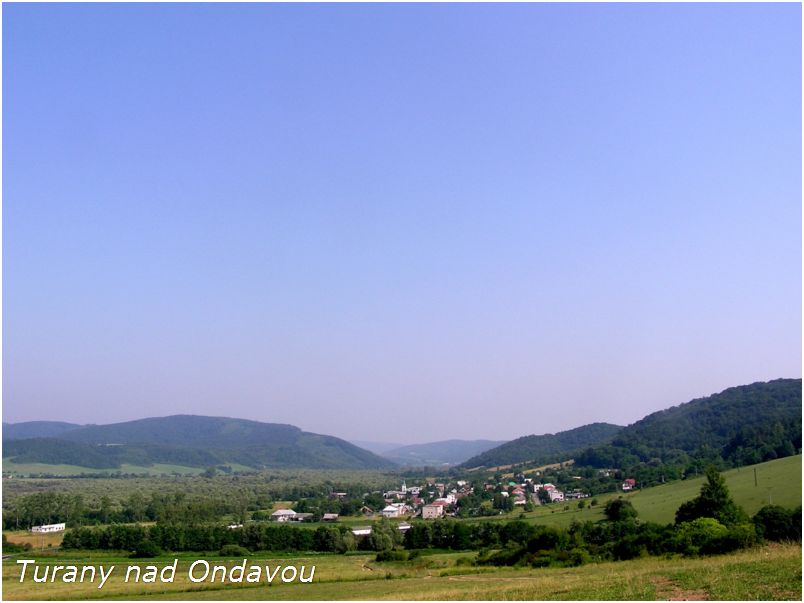

- Flag

- Location of Turany nad Ondavou in the Prešov Region Location of Turany nad Ondavou in Slovakia
- Coordinates: 49.10°N 21.67°E
- Country: Slovakia
- Region: Prešov Region
- District: Stropkov District
- First mentioned: 1567

Area
  - Total: 9.59 km^{2} (3.70 sq mi)
- Elevation: 176 m (577 ft)

Population (2025)
  - Total: 337
- Time zone: UTC+1 (CET)
  - Summer (DST): UTC+2 (CEST)
- Postal code: 903 3
- Area code: +421 54
- Vehicle registration plate (until 2022): SP
- Website: www.turanynadondavou.sk

Turany nad Ondavou (Hungarian: Turány) is a village and municipality in Stropkov District in the Prešov Region of north-eastern Slovakia.

== History ==
In historical records the village was first mentioned in 1567.

== Geography ==
The municipality lies at an altitude of 176 metres (577 ft) and covers an area of 9.59 km^{2} (3.70 sq mi) (2025).

== Population ==
Population statistic (10 years)
Year	1995	2005	2015	2025
Count	409	400	383	337
Difference		−2.20%	−4.25%	−12.01%

Population statistic
Year	2024	2025
Count	345	337
Difference		−2.31%

It has a population of 337 people (31 December 2025).

=== Ethnicity ===
Census 2021 (1+ %)
Ethnicity	Number	Fraction
Slovak	338	97.12%
Rusyn	11	3.16%
Not found out	9	2.58%
Total	348	

In year 2021 was 348 people by ethnicity 338 as Slovak, 11 as Rusyn, 9 as Not found out and 2 as Ukrainian.

Note on population: The difference values of population numbers in the table "Population statistic" and in the sections "Ethnicity" & "Religion" is caused by the use of various statistical methods.

=== Religion ===
Census 2021 (1+ %)
Religion	Number	Fraction
Roman Catholic Church	300	86.21%
Greek Catholic Church	19	5.46%
None	11	3.16%
Not found out	9	2.59%
Eastern Orthodox Church	5	1.44%
Total	348	

In year 2021 was 348 people by religion 300 from Roman Catholic Church, 19 from Greek Catholic Church, 11 from None, 9 from Not found out, 5 from Eastern Orthodox Church, 2 from Other and not ascertained christian church, 1 from Other and 1 from Ad hoc movements.

== Famous natives ==
- Marika Gombitová
