= Muž Nula =

- A screenshot of the official music video

Song by Marika Gombitová

from the album Mince na dne fontán
- Language: Slovak
- Released: 1983
- Genre: Pop rock
- Length: 3:48
- Label: OPUS
- Songwriters: Marika Gombitová; Kamil Peteraj
- Producer: Ján Lauko

Audio sample
- "Muž Nula": file; help

Muž Nula (in English transcribed as "Clockwork Men") is a song by Marika Gombitová released on OPUS in 1983.

The title composed by the artist herself, and accompanied with lyrics by Kamil Peteraj, was released as the pilot track to promote the singer's fourth solo studio album Mince na dne fontán. In 1984, its official music video won an Audience Choice award in the Slovak television video chart called 5xP.

== Official versions ==
1. "Muž Nula" - Original version, 1983
2. "Clockwork Men" - International version, 1983

== Credits and personnel ==
- Marika Gombitová - lead vocal, writer
- Kamil Peteraj - lyrics
- Ladislav Lučenič - bass, acoustic guitar, electric guitar, organ, piano, ARP Oddysey, Minimoog, vocoder, citare, drums, strings
- Dušan Hájek - drums
- Jozef Hanák - harmonique, sound director
- Ján Lauko - producer
- Ján Filo - sound director
- Michal Ivanický - technical coordination
- Igor Adamec - technical coordination

== Awards ==
=== 5xP ===
5xP, respectively Päť pekných pesničiek pre potešenie (English: Five Nice Songs For Pleasure) was one of the Slovak TV music programs, in which either artists, or upcomers themselves competed by presenting their songs. The show ran from 1983 to 1987, and the others popular (however, with no live audience) were Chose a Song (1967–76), The Ours 9 (1975–79), A Chance for the Talented (1976–83) and 6+1 (1979-83). Gombitová won an Audience Choice award (1984).

Year	Nominated work	Category	Result
1984	"Muž Nula"	Audience Choice	Won
