= Voľné miesto v srdci =

Studio album by Marika Gombitová
- Released: 1986
- Recorded: 1986
- Genre: Pop; electronic
- Length: 41:35
- Label: OPUS (#9113 1731)
- Producer: Ján Lauko; Peter Smolinský

Marika Gombitová chronology
Moje najmilšie (1985)	Voľné miesto v srdci (1986)	Zrkadlo rokov (1987)

Voľné miesto v srdci (English: A Free Place in the Heart) is the sixth solo album by Marika Gombitová released on OPUS in 1986.

== Track listing ==
All tracks are written by Gombitová and Peteraj, unless stated otherwise.

No.	Title	Writer(s)	Length
1.	"Blázni v parku"	Patejdl; Peteraj	3:51
2.	"Uličník Bozk" (duet with Václav Patejdl)		3:19
3.	"Prípad pre rodičov"	Patejdl; Peteraj	4:20
4.	"Adresa ja, adresa ty"		3:41
5.	"Chlapci v pasci"		3:30
6.	"Správa o mladosti"	Dušík; Hegedüš; Peteraj	3:11
7.	"Voľné miesto v srdci"		4:42
8.	"Tulák v čiernej bunde"	Dušík; Peteraj	3:13
9.	"Konkurz na najkrajšiu dvojicu"	Dušík; Peteraj	3:16
10.	"Správne dievčatá"		4:10
11.	"Záverečná"		4:22
Total length:			41:35

Voľné miesto v srdci: Komplet 6 (Bonus Tracks)
No.	Title	Length
12.	"Novembrové chryzantémy" (taken from Polnočné otázky: 16 Naj 1984–1993)	3:22
13.	"Čas zelených zrkadiel" (previously unreleased)	3:08
Total length:		48:05

== Official releases ==
- 1986: Voľné miesto v srdci, LP, MC, OPUS, #9113 1731
- 1996: Voľné miesto v srdci, CD, re-release, OPUS, #91 2492
- 2004: Voľné miesto v srdci: Komplet 6, 2 bonus tracks, CD, OPUS, #91 1731

== Credits and personnel ==
- Marika Gombitová - lead vocal, writer
- Václav Patejdl - lead vocal, writer, Roland Jupiter 6, SCI Pro-One, Roland MC 202, Linn Drum
- Gabo Dušík - writer, Roland Juno 60, Yamaha DX 7, Yamaha PF 15, piano
- Ján Szabo - bass
- Štefan Hegedüš - writer, electric and acoustic guitar
- Juraj Varsanyi - Simmons drumm
- Marián Jaslovský - tenor saxophone
- Ivan Jombík - programming, Yamaha drum computer RX 11, sound director
- Ján Lauko - producer
- Peter Smolinský - producer
- Štefan Danko - responsible editor

== Accolades ==
=== Nový čas ===
In 2007, Voľné miesto v srdci was ranked 66th on the list of the 100 Greatest Slovak Albums of All Time by Nový čas.

=== POPulár ===
POPulár was a Slovak music magazine that mapped the domestic and international music scene, maintaining also POP awards. The magazine was published monthly since 1970, until its termination in 1992 (Note: In July 2008, the magazine was restored by Nový Populár, issued twice a month). Gombitová won four times as the Best Female Singer (1983, 1986, 1987-8), and once she received the Best Album award (1987).

Year	Category	Result
1986	Best Album	#4
