= Ateliér duše =

Studio album by Marika Gombitová
- Released: 1987
- Recorded: 1987
- Genre: Pop; electronic
- Length: 44:33
- Label: OPUS (#9313 1915)
- Producer: Peter Smolinský

Marika Gombitová chronology
Zrkadlo rokov (1987)	Ateliér duše (1987)	Slávnosť úprimných slov (1987)

Compact disc

Ateliér duše (English: Soul Atelier) is the seventh solo album by Marika Gombitová released on OPUS in 1987.

== Track listing ==
All tracks are written by Gombitová and Peteraj, unless stated otherwise

No.	Title	Writer(s)	Length
1.	"Ateliér duše"	Patejdl; Peteraj	3:51
2.	"V období dažďa"		3:19
3.	"Koloseum"		4:20
4.	"Mačací flám"	Patejdl; Peteraj	3:41
5.	"Prvý príbeh"		3:30
6.	"Štúdie žien"		3:11
7.	"Malá smutná baletka"	Patejdl; Peteraj	4:42
8.	"Ži a nechaj žiť"		3:13
9.	"Zámená"	Patejdl; Peteraj	3:16
10.	"Neznámy pár" (duet with Karel Gott)		4:10
11.	"Tak si so mnou opakuj"	Patejdl; Peteraj	4:22
Total length:			44:33

Ateliér duše (Bonus tracks)
No.	Title	Length
12.	"Nenápadná"	3:35
13.	"Mami, mami" (taken from SP "Nenápadná")	3:50
Total length:		53:22

Ateliér duše: Komplet 7 (Bonus tracks EP Slávnosť úprimných slov)
No.	Title	Writer(s)	Length
12.	"Snehové sypané" (quartet with Václav Patejdl, Ján Lehotský and Richard Müller)	Patejdl; Peteraj	4:03
13.	"Vianočný popevok"	Patejdl; Peteraj	2:42
14.	"To, čo je v nás" (duet with Patejdl)	Patejdl; Peteraj	2:53
15.	"Slávnosť úprimných slov" (trio with Patejdl and Lehotský)	Gombitová; Patejdl; Peteraj	3:16
Total length:			65:31

== Official releases ==
"Koloseum" by Marika Gombitová
One of the singer's most played compositions.

- 1987: Ateliér duše, LP, MC, OPUS, #9313 1915
- 1996: Ateliér duše, CD, re-release, Open Music, #0050 2331
- 1996: Ateliér duše, 2 bonus tracks (SP "Mami, mami"), CD, OPUS, #91 2561
- 2004: Ateliér duše: Komplet 7, 4 bonus tracks (EP Slávnosť úprimných slov), CD, OPUS, #91 2561

== Credits and personnel ==
- Marika Gombitová - lead vocal, writer
- Václav Patejdl - writer, piano, keyboards, LinnDrum computer, chorus
- Kamil Peteraj - lyrics
- Karel Gott - lead vocal
- Juraj Burian - electric and acoustic guitar
- Andrej Šeban - electric guitar
- Michal Důžek - bass, chorus
- Peter Penthor - chorus
- Trend band - chorus
- Štefan Danko - responsible editor
- Peter Smolinský - producer
- Juraj Filo - sound director
- Jozef Krajčovič - sound director
- Ivan Minárik - technical coordination
- Fedor Nemec - photography

== Charts ==
=== Weekly charts ===
Chart (1987)	Peak position
Slovak Albums Chart	9
Chart (1989)	Peak position
Slovak Albums Chart	8

=== Year-end charts ===
Chart (2007)	Peak position
The 100 Greatest Slovak Albums of All Time	43

== Awards ==
=== POPulár ===
POPulár was a Slovak music magazine that mapped the domestic and international music scene, maintaining also POP awards. The magazine was published monthly since 1970, until its termination in 1992 (Note: In July 2008, the magazine was restored by Nový Populár, issued twice a month). Gombitová won four times as the Best Female Singer (1983, 1986, 1987-8), and once she received the Best Album award (1987).

Year	Nominated work	Category	Result
1987	Ateliér duše	Best Album	Won

=== Mladé rozlety ===
Mladé rozlety,^{[E]} established by the poet Ivan Štrpka was a color magazine intended for teenagers and the youth. After two sampler issues, the periodical was released weekly since January 1987, and in the 90's renamed as M-Report. Apart from music polls, the magazine also organized a national contest of Slovak amateur bands. Gombitová won one poll (1988).

Year	Nominated work	Category	Result
1988	Ateliér duše	Best Album	Won

Notes

- E Mladé rozlety was also the name of a Slovak punk group (formed in May 1988 as one of the first of its kind in the country).

== Video release ==
Ateliér duše

Video by Marika Gombitová
- Released: September 1, 1987 (TV)
- Recorded: 1986–87
- Genre: Pop; electronic
- Label: Videofilm SFT Koliba
- Director: Ladislav Kaboš; Juraj Lihosit

A video release of the album on VHS, also entitled Ateliér duše, followed the album in 1987, as the first video-cassette ever released by a Czechoslovak artist.

=== Track listing ===
All tracks are written by Gombitová and Peteraj, unless stated otherwise

No.	Title	Writer(s)	Length
1.	"Ateliér duše"	Patejdl; Peteraj
2.	"Cirkusový kôň"	Lauko; Peteraj
3.	"Malá smutná baletka"	Patejdl; Peteraj
4.	"Mačací flám"	Patejdl; Peteraj
5.	"V období dažďa"
6.	"Koloseum"
7.	"Tak si so mnou opakuj"	Patejdl; Peteraj
8.	"Správne dievčatá" (taken from TV Adresa ja, adresa ty)
9.	"Crazy" (taken from TV Adresa ja, adresa ty)
10.	"Príbeh obrazovky" (taken from TV Adresa ja, adresa ty)
11.	"Vernisáž" (taken from TV Adresa ja, adresa ty)
12.	"Zem menom láska" (taken from TV Adresa ja, adresa ty)
13.	"Adresa ja, adresa ty" (taken from TV Adresa ja, adresa ty)

=== Credits and personnel ===
- Marika Gombitová - lead vocal, writer
- Václav Patejdl - writer
- Ján Lauko
- Kamil Peteraj - lyrics
- Ladislav Kaboš - director
- Juraj Lihosit - director
- Filmové ateliéry Koliba - studio
