= Peter Breiner =

Slovak pianist, conductor, and composer (born 1957)

- Born: 3 July 1957 (age 69); Humenné, Czechoslovakia
- Education: Academy of Performing Arts in Bratislava
- Occupations: Composer; conductor; pianist
- Website: peterbreiner.com

Peter Breiner (born 3 July 1957) is a Slovak pianist, conductor, and composer.

== Biography ==
=== Early life and studies ===
Breiner, born in Humenné, Czechoslovakia, began to play the piano at age four. When he was nine, he enrolled at the conservatory in Košice, Slovakia, where he studied piano, percussion, composition, and conducting. He subsequently moved to Bratislava, where he attended the Academy of Performing Arts, continuing his composition studies under the tuition of Alexander Moyzes. He graduated from the academy in 1982.

=== Career ===
Breiner has recorded over 260 albums as conductor, composer, arranger, and pianist. He is known for his arrangements, such as Baroque versions of the Beatles and similar adaptations of Elvis Presley, as well as arrangements of popular Christmas music. His 2004 release of all the national anthems of the world was used at the Athens Olympic Committee as the music for medal ceremonies at the games. He has collaborated with other notable musicians, including Peter Lipa, Gustav Brom, and Milan Markovič.

In 1998, he published his first book, titled Javorové listy, and in 2015, his second book, Iný glóbus nemáte?, came out.

Since 2006, he has collaborated with violinist Stanislav Palúch and accordionist Boris Lenko as the trio Triango.

His triple-CD Janáček Operatic Suites, released on Naxos, was ranked as one of Chicago Tribune's Top Ten Classical CDs of 2009.

Breiner has also had a career as a television personality. In the early 2000s, his talk show on STV, called Do You Have Something Against That?, was temporarily banned, due to accusations of being exceedingly controversial.

On 1 January 2018, Slovak President Andrej Kiska presented Breiner with the Order of Ľudovít Štúr.

In 2022, Breiner started a collaboration with the streaming company OnAir, conducting the Royal Philharmonic Orchestra, resulting in three films of Stravinsky ballets (The Firebird, Petrushka, The Rite of Spring). The same year, he began releasing solo piano albums on the Naxos and Orchid Classics/Blue Cloud Music labels.).

=== Personal life ===
Breiner lived in Toronto, Canada, from March 1992 to June 2007. From June 2007 to June 2020, he resided in New York City, and since July 2020, he lives in London, England.

== Awards and recognition ==
- Friends of Slovakia prize – for the promotion of Slovak culture in the United States (2014)
- Order of Ľudovít Štúr (2018)

== See also ==
- The 100 Greatest Slovak Albums of All Time
