= Mince na dne fontán =

Compilation album by Marika Gombitová
- Released: 1983
- Recorded: 1983
- Genre: Pop rock
- Length: 41:22 (Disc 1); 42:46 (Disc 2)
- Label: OPUS (#9113 1354/5)
- Producer: Ján Lauko

Marika Gombitová chronology
Záhradná kaviareň (1983)	Mince na dne fontán (1983)	№5 (1984)

Mince na dne fontán (English: Coins on the Bottom of Fountains) is the fourth album by Marika Gombitová, released on OPUS in 1983.

== Track listing ==
All tracks are written by Gombitová and Peteraj.

One
No.	Title	Length
1.	"Skúška prvých šiat"	3:30
2.	"Muž Nula"	3:48
3.	"Môj brat strom"	2:40
4.	"Deti z domovov"	5:25
5.	"Beh do slnka"	4:38
6.	"Kúsok šťastia"	3:23
7.	"Keď svitá pod srdcom žien"	7:10
8.	"Pán Nik"	2:46
9.	"Lietaš v tom"	4:21
10.	"Cena priateľov"	3:41
Total length:		41:22

All tracks are written by Lehotský and Peteraj.

Two
No.	Title	Length
11.	"Zelenáč máj"	4:43
12.	"Dievča s krásnou tvárou"	4:29
13.	"Smetiarsky kráľ"	4:04
14.	"Výťah do neba"	3:46
15.	"Cesty"	4:00
16.	"Školská lavica"	3:43
17.	"Sviatok pochybností"	3:36
18.	"Tabletka údel"	3:16
19.	"Nočné kupé"	5:39
20.	"Cena pokladov"	5:30
Total length:		42:46

== Official releases ==
- 1983: Mince na dne fontán, LP, MC, OPUS, #9113 1354/5
- 1995: Mince na dne fontán, re-release, 2CD, re-release, Open Music #0027 5312
- 2004: Mince na dne fontán: Komplet 4, 2CD (excluded track 7: "Keď svitá pod srdcom žien"), OPUS, #91 1354

== Credits and personnel ==
- Marika Gombitová - lead vocal
- Kamil Peteraj - lyrics
- Ján Lauko - producer
- Jozef Hanák - sound director
- Ján Filo - sound director
- Michal Ivanický - technical coordination
- Igor Adamec - technical coordination
- Karol Dlugolinský - photography

One

- Marika Gombitová - writer
- Ladislav Lučenič - bass, acoustic guitar, electric guitar, organ, piano, ARP Oddysey, Minimoog, vocoder, zither, drums, strings
- Dušan Hájek - drums
- Jozef Hanák - harmonique

Two

- Ján Lehotský - lead vocal, writer, piano, Roland Jupiter 4, Korg, Hohner piano, Fender piano, strings
- Ján Hangóny - guitar solo guitar, chorus
- Anastasis Engonidis - bass, chorus
- Karol Morvay - drums
- Jiří Vana - solo guitar
- Vlado Kaššay - chorus
- Ľuboš Stankovský - chorus

== Legacy ==
In 2007, Mince na dne fontán placed at number 30 on the list of the 100 Greatest Slovak Albums of All Time.

== Sales certifications ==
=== ČNS IFPI ===
In Slovakia, the International Federation of the Phonographic Industry for the Czech Republic (ČNS IFPI) awards artists since the cancellation of the Slovak national section (SNS IFPI). Currently, there are awarded Gold (for 3,000 units), and/or Platinum certifications (for 6,000 units), exclusively for album releases. Gombitová demonstrably won at least seven platinum, and three golden awards in total.

Year	Nominated work	Award	Format	Result
1984	Mince na dne fontán	Gold	2LP	Won

== Export release ==
My Friend the Tree

Studio album by Marika Gombitová
- Released: 1984
- Recorded: 1983
- Genre: Pop rock
- Length: 41:22
- Label: OPUS (#9113 1586)
- Producer: Ján Lauko

Marika Gombitová chronology
Rainy Day Girl (1981)	My Friend the Tree (1984)	№5 (1985)

The export version of the album, entitled My Friend the Tree, was issued in 1984.

=== Track listing ===
All tracks are written by Gombitová and Peteraj.

No.	Title	Length
1.	"In Front of the Mirror"	3:30
2.	"Clockwork Men"	3:48
3.	"My Friend the Tree"	2:40
4.	"Parentless Children"	5:25
5.	"The Long Distance Run"	4:38
6.	"Try to Find Out"	3:23
7.	"Mothers"	7:10
8.	"Pick Up Your Courage"	2:46
9.	"The Time and We"	4:21
10.	"If You Have a Friend"	3:41
Total length:		41:22

=== Official releases ===
1984: My Friend the Tree, LP, MC, OPUS, #9113 1586

=== Additional credits and personnel ===
- Katarína Karovičová-Rybková - English transcription
- Štefan Danko - editor
- Zuzana Mináčová - photography
- M. Brocko - design
