= Daniel Junas =

Slovak actor and musician (born 1962)

- Born: 16 January 1962 (age 64); Bratislava, Slovakia
- Other name: Dano Junas
- Occupations: Actor and Singer-Songwriter

Daniel Junas, also known as Dano Junas, (born 16 January 1962) is a Slovak actor, moderator, singer-songwriter and one-time Slovak Gramy Award winner.

== Personal life ==
Junas was born in Bratislava, Slovakia. His mother, Helen, was an opera singer, and his stepfather, Jan, was a singer and theater director.

He emigrated to Canada before the Velvet Revolution, later returning to Slovakia, where he campaigned for political party Movement for a Democratic Slovakia (HZDS) ahead of the 1999 Slovak presidential election. Junas was involved in a serious traffic incident in Bratislava in 1997, failing to yield at a stop sign and hitting a truck. He sustained a fractured skull and spent a month in hospital. He had a second, less serious experience in the same city in 2008, when he was hit on the passenger side by another vehicle, although did not sustain any injuries.

He married Denisa Kráľová at a launch event of one of his albums in April 2005, when he released a greatest hits CD, titled Snívať celý život. He has two daughters, Sandra and Daniela.

== Career ==
Junas began acting and singing as a teenager. Shortly afterwards, he decided to pursue a career in acting when he was cast in a 1984 television show entitled Triangel. During the 1990s, he ventured into the music industry, and has since made 8 albums, one winning a European Grammy. Junas has also dabbled in modeling, landing campaigns for Ford, Honda and Kenvelo. He was one of the presenters of the 2006 Anděl Awards, held at the ČEZ Aréna in Ostrava in 2007.

Also, Junas has been in musical theatre, performing in Grease.

== Film and television ==
- Místo zlocinu Ostrava (TV series, 2020)
- Detektív Dušo (TV series, 2018)
- Až po uši (TV series, 2014)
- Rodinné prípady (TV series, 2012)
- V mene zákona (TV series, 2009)
- Vášnivé známosti (1994)
- Roky prelomu (TV series, 1989)
- Skleníková Venuša (1985)
- Bakaláři (TV series, 1971)

== Radio ==
- Rock FM (10 years of own talk show Trianglovna)
- Fun Radio (6 years of own talk show DJ-Show)
- Radio Koliba (4 years of own talk show DJ-Show II)

== CD Albums ==
- Let's Together (featuring Alexa)
- Phantom into feather-bed
- You are Flying in it With Me
- Don't Sleep
- Macho - Polygram
- Perfect Copuple
- Best of - Universal
- Dreaming My Whole Life

=== CDs for Children ===
- They Are Catching Us
- It's Here Again
- Everything is Flying
- Beautiful Party
- Far out Day
- Far out Day II.
- Arara Karao Circus
- Teacher Destroyer
- Did it Self (Samo Sato)
- Where is this World Falling To
- Name, City, Animal, Thing
