= Dievča do dažďa =

Studio album by Marika Gombitová
- Released: 1979
- Recorded: Jun/July 1979, Pezinok, Slovakia
- Genre: Big beat; pop
- Length: 49:44
- Label: OPUS (#9116 0858)
- Producer: Ján Lauko; Milan Vašica

Marika Gombitová chronology
Dievča do dažďa (1979)	Balíček snov (1980)

Singles from Dievča do dažďa
- 1. "Vyznanie"; 2. "Kufor a šál"

Dievča do dažďa (Rainy Day Girl) is the debut solo album by Slovak singer-songwriter Marika Gombitová, released on OPUS in 1979.

== Track listing ==
All tracks are written by Lehotský and Peteraj, unless stated otherwise.

No.	Title	Writer(s)	Length
1.	"Láska"	Hammel; Peteraj	2:53
2.	"Sedem týždňov"		2:50
3.	"Zelený máj"		5:38
4.	"Napíš"	Hammel; Peteraj	2:45
5.	"Studňa"		4:05
6.	"Nostalgia"		3:55
7.	"Maratón"	Lučenič; Peteraj	4:05
8.	"Kufor a šál" (duet with Ján Lehotský)		3:33
9.	"Kráľ Smiech"		4:48
10.	"Pieseň naopak"	Hammel; Peteraj	3:17
11.	"Výpredaj"	Hammel; Peteraj	3:25
12.	"Vyznanie"		4:43
13.	"Epilóg"		3:47
Total length:			49:44

Dievča do dažďa: Komplet 1 (Bonus Tracks)
No.	Title	Writer(s)	Length
14.	"Deň ako z pohľadnice" (previously unreleased)	Lehotský; Laurinc	2:46
15.	"Boľavé námestie" (taken from OPUS '77)	Lehotský; Brezovská	2:47
16.	"Ty vieš, mama" (previously unreleased)	Lehotský; Brhlovič	4:00
17.	"Pripútaná" (taken from Modus)		4:58
18.	"Domy na zbúranie" (taken from Modus)		5:27
19.	"Študentská láska" (taken from OPUS '78)	Hammel; Peteraj	3:23
Total length:			73:05

Dievča do dažďa: Collectors Edition (Bonus CD: Rainy Day Girl)
No.	Title	Writer(s)	Length
14.	"Anytime"	Hammel; Peteraj	2:53
15.	"Seven Days in Heaven"		2:50
16.	"Together We Can Work It Out"		5:38
17.	"Reflection"	Hammel; Peteraj	2:45
18.	"A Message to The Songwriters"		4:05
19.	"My Little Rainbow"		3:55
20.	"Follow the Sun"	Lučenič; Peteraj	4:05
21.	"I'm Flying" (duet with Lehotský)		3:33
22.	"Try to Remember"		4:48
23.	"My Little Story"	Hammel; Peteraj	3:17
24.	"Stupid Girl"	Hammel; Peteraj	3:25
25.	"Why?"		4:43
26.	"Her song"		3:47
Total length:			99:28

== Official releases ==
- 1979: Dievča do dažďa, LP, MC, OPUS, #9116 0858
- 1995: Dievča do dažďa, CD, re-release, Open Music #0024 2331
- 2000: Dievča do dažďa: Komplet 1, 6 bonus tracks, CD, Sony Music Bonton, No. 49 7691
- 2003: Dievča do dažďa: Komplet 1, 6 bonus tracks, CD, No. 91 0858
- 2008: Dievča do dažďa: 2CD Collectors Edition, bonus CD (export release), OPUS, No. 91 2791

== Credits and personnel ==
- Marika Gombitová – lead vocal
- Ján Lehotský – lead vocal, writer, keyboards
- Ladislav Lučenič – writer, bass, acoustic guitar, back vocal
- Cyril Zeleňák – drums, percussion
- František Griglák – solo guitar, synthesizer
- Ľubomír Tamaškovič – tenox sax
- Pavol Hammel – writer, acoustic guitar,
- Viliam Pobjecký – solo guitar
- Kamil Peteraj – lyrics, notes
- M Tadla – string group conductor
- Ján Lauko – music director
- Milan Vašica – music director
- Tibor Borský – photography
- Ivan Minárik – technical collaboration
- Jozef Hanák – technical collaboration
- Zoro Laurinc – lyrics (bonus track 14, Komplet 1)
- Vlasta Brezovská – lyrics (bonus track 15, Komplet 1)
- Peter Brhlovič – lyrics (bonus track 16, Komplet 1)

== Legacy ==
In 2007, Dievča do dažďa placed 20th on the list of the 100 Greatest Slovak Albums of All Time.

== Export release ==
Rainy Day Girl

Studio album by Marika Gombitová
- Released: 1981
- Recorded: January 1980, Pezinok, Slovakia
- Genre: Big beat; pop
- Length: 49:44
- Label: OPUS (#9116 0973)
- Producer: Ján Lauko; Milan Vašica

Marika Gombitová chronology
Rainy Day Girl (1981)	My Friend the Tree (1984)

The export version of the album, entitled Rainy Day Girl, was issued in 1981.

=== Track listing ===
All tracks are written by Lehotský and Peteraj, unless stated otherwise.

No.	Title	Writer(s)	Length
1.	"Anytime"	Hammel; Peteraj	2:53
2.	"Seven Days in Heaven"		2:50
3.	"Together We Can Work It Out"		5:38
4.	"Reflection"	Hammel; Peteraj	2:45
5.	"A Message to the Songwriters"		4:05
6.	"My Little Rainbow"		3:55
7.	"Follow the Sun"	Lučenič; Peteraj	4:05
8.	"I'm Flying" (duet with Ján Lehotský)		3:33
9.	"Try to Remember"		4:48
10.	"My Little Story"	Hammel; Peteraj	3:17
11.	"Stupid Girl"	Hammel; Peteraj	3:25
12.	"Why?"		4:43
13.	"Her song"		3:47
Total length:			49:44

=== Official releases ===
- 1981: Rainy Day Girl, LP, MC, OPUS, #9116 0973
- 2008: Dievča do dažďa: 2CD Collectors Edition, bonus CD (export release), OPUS, No. 91 2791

=== Additional credits and personnel ===
- Peter Saller – English transcription
