= Študentská láska =

- Cover of a later re-pressing, approx. 1980

Single by Marika Gombitová

from the album OPUS '78
- B-side: "Podnájom" (by Hammel on OPUS); "Zažni" (by Žbirka on Tonpress)
- Released: 1978
- Recorded: 1978
- Genre: Big beat
- Length: 3:22
- Label: OPUS (#9143 0470); Tonpress (#S-308)
- Songwriters: Pavol Hammel; Kamil Peteraj

Marika Gombitová singles chronology
"Boľavé námestie" (1977)	"Študentská láska" (1978)	"Vyznanie" (1979)

Audio sample
- "Študentská láska": file; help

Music video
- "Študentská láska" on YouTube

"Študentská láska" (English: Student Love) is a song by the female singer Marika Gombitová released on OPUS in 1978.

The composition written by Pavol Hammel and Kamil Peteraj won the Golden award at the Bratislavská lýra '78 in both held competitions. In the contest of the Czechoslovak authors, as well as in the international competition.

Initially, the song was released in an instrumental version performed by the Orchester of Jozef Vobruba on the vinyl sampler set OPUS Club '02 followed by the gramophone record of the most Slovak popular songs of 1978 entitled OPUS '78. After re-releasing the singer's debut album Dievča do dažďa (1979) on CD in 2003, the song was for the first time available also in a digital format.

While in the country of its origin the single was released with Pavol Hammel's song "Podnájom," in Poland on Tonpress "Zažni" by M.Žbirka featured on B-side.

== Official versions ==
1. "Študentská láska" - Studio version, Latino, Bratislavská lýra, 1978
2. "Študentská láska" - Live version, Bratislavská lýra, 1978
3. "Študentská láska" - Live version, Rodný môj kraj (TV), 1978
4. "Studentenliebe" - German version, 1978
5. "Študentská láska" - Studio version, big beat, with the band Vivat, 1979
6. "Študentská láska" - Instrumental version by the Orchester of Jozef Vobruba

== Credits and personnel ==
- Marika Gombitová - lead vocal
- Pavol Hammel - music
- Kamil Peteraj - lyrics
- Bezinky - backing vocals
- OPUS Records - copyright

== Charts ==
Chart (1978)	Peak position
Slovak Singles Chart	1

== Awards ==
=== Bratislavská lýra ===
Bratislavská lýra (English: Bratislava Lyre) was an annual festival of popular songs in former Czechoslovakia, established in 1966 in Bratislava. Two competitions were held; the category of Czechoslovak songwriters and the international contest. Winners were awarded by a golden, silver and/or bronze Lyre (depending on a position). Special prizes included Audience Choice, Journalists Choice, and Lifetime Achievement award. Gombitová won seven awards in total - three golden lyres (1977–78), one of silver (1979) and bronze (1980), plus an Audience Choice award (1977).

Year	Nominated work	Category	Result
1978	"Študentská láska"	International Contest	Gold
1978	"Študentská láska"	Czechoslovak Authors	Gold

=== Internationales Schlagerfestival Dresden ===
Internationales Schlagerfestival Dresden (English: International Pop Festival in Dresden) was a German music festival (1971–1988). It was usually held in September and/or October for five days and the annual event took place at the Kulturpalast Dresden. The main prize was "Grand Prix", including Gold, Silver and/or bronze medals. Among others, also other awards were bestowed, such as the Price of the Press Jury, and Audience Award. Gombitová received an award at the occasion of the 7th edition of the fest (in 1978).

Year	Nominated work	Category	Result
1978	"Studentenliebe"	Price of the State Committee for Radio at the Council of Ministers GDR	Won
