= Vyznanie =

- Cover of a vinyl single from Bratislavská Lýra

Single by Marika Gombitová

from the album Dievča do dažďa
- B-side: "Malý veľký vlak" (by Miro Žbirka)
- Released: June/July, 1979
- Recorded: 1979
- Genre: Bel canto, cantilena
- Length: 4:46
- Label: OPUS (#9143 0500)
- Songwriters: Janko Lehotský; Kamil Peteraj
- Producers: Ján Lauko; Milan Vašica

Marika Gombitová singles chronology
"Študentská láska" (1978)	"Vyznanie" (1979)	"Kufor a šál" (1979)

Audio sample
- "Vyznanie": file; help

Music video
- "Vyznanie" - original version on YouTube "Why?" - international version on YouTube

"Vyznanie" (in English transcribed as "Why (Must I Always Fail)?", respectively also known as "Declaration") is a song by the female singer Marika Gombitová released on OPUS in 1979.

The composition written by Janko Lehotský, in common with Kamil Peteraj, is referred to as her masterpiece receiving several awards. Including the Silver award at the Bratislavská lýra '79 in the contest of the Czechoslovak songwriters. At the 4th Intervision Song Festival contest in Sopot, Poland the following year, the song won the first prize for the Best Performance in the category representing record companies. Most recently, the single was voted by the TV audience as Hit storočia (English: Hit of the Century) in Slovakia, followed by the tribute program Vyznanie pre Mariku (English: A Confession for Marika) broadcast by Slovak Television on December 23, 2007.

Originally, the song was released on the singer's debut album Dievča do dažďa, being available on numerous compilations in addition. An international version was recorded under title "Why?" (the English translation of the title would mean "Declaration", however), and released on her export album Rainy Day Girl (1981). B-side of the single "Malý veľký vlak" was later issued on the Modus self-titled album (Modus).

== Official versions ==
1. "Vyznanie" - Studio version, original 1979
2. "Why?" (a.k.a. "Declaration") - Studio version, international, 1980

== Credits and personnel ==
- Marika Gombitová - lead vocal
- Janko Lehotský - music
- Kamil Peteraj - lyrics
- Ján Lauko - producer
- Milan Vašica - producer
- OPUS - copyright

== Awards ==
=== Bratislavská lýra ===
Bratislavská lýra (English: Bratislava Lyre) was an annual festival of popular songs in former Czechoslovakia, established in 1966 in Bratislava. Two competitions were held; the category of Czechoslovak songwriters and the international contest. Winners were awarded by a golden, silver and/or bronze Lyre (depending on a position). Special prizes included Audience Choice, Journalists Choice, and Lifetime Achievement award. Gombitová won seven awards in total - three golden lyres (1977–78), one of silver (1979) and bronze (1980), plus an Audience Choice award (1977).

Year	Nominated work	Category	Result
1979	"Vyznanie"	Czechoslovak Authors	Silver

=== Intervision ===
Intervision Song Contest (ISC), originally known as Sopot International Song Festival (Sopot ISF), was organized by the International Radio and Television Organisation, an Eastern network of radio and television broadcasting companies. Unlike its equivalent, the Eurovision (ESC), Intervision often changed formulas to pick a winner, running different competitions at the same time. The festival was held at Forest Opera in Sopot, Poland, and Gombitová won one award (1980).

Year	Nominated work	Category	Result
1980	"Vyznanie" "Chcem sa s tebou deliť"	Best Performance	Won^{A}

=== Diskoslavík ===
Diskoslavík (English: DiscoNightingale) was an attempt in behalf of major Czechoslovak disc jockeys to award artists for best acts also on the disco music field. The award was voted by DJs on fifty major discoteques. Gombitová appeared in the 88's volume, reaching the highest score as the 3rd Most Favorite Female Singer and the 5th Best Singer of All-time. "Vyznanie" itself reached at number six.

Year	Nominated work	Category	Result
1988	"Vyznanie"	Best Song of All-time	#6

=== Hit storočia ===
The Hit storočia (English: Hit of the Century) was a national TV competition organized by Slovenská televízia. Within its three-month run (beginning April 20, 2007), the viewers voted live the most popular Slovak songs from the 1930s to 1990s. Overall, nine songs were picked to compete in the final evening. Gombitová competed in the show with three songs, winning it with a song written by Janko Lehotský and Kamil Peteraj from 1979.

Year	Nominated work	Category	Result
2007	"Vyznanie"	Hit of the Century	Won^{B}

Notes

- ^{A} The First Prize in the category representing record companies shared Gombitová with Nikolai Gnatiuk ("Dance on a Drum") from Russia. Grand Prix '80 award won Marion ("Where Is the Love?") from Finland.
- ^{B} The title won scoring 30.4% votes in total. The rest Top 3 positions featured "V slovenských dolinách" by Karol Duchoň (at #2), and "Voda čo ma drží nad vodou" by Jožo Ráž.

== Cover versions ==
- 1999: Lucie Bílá
- 2007: Sisa Sklovská
- 2008: Monika Absolonová (with substantial lyrics, written by Marek Vrba.)
- 2009: Dominika Stará
- 2009: Ivana Poláčková
- 2010: Dara Rolins

== See also ==
- Česko Slovenská Superstar
- X Factor (Czech Republic)
