= Marika Gombitová =

Slovak musician (born 1956)

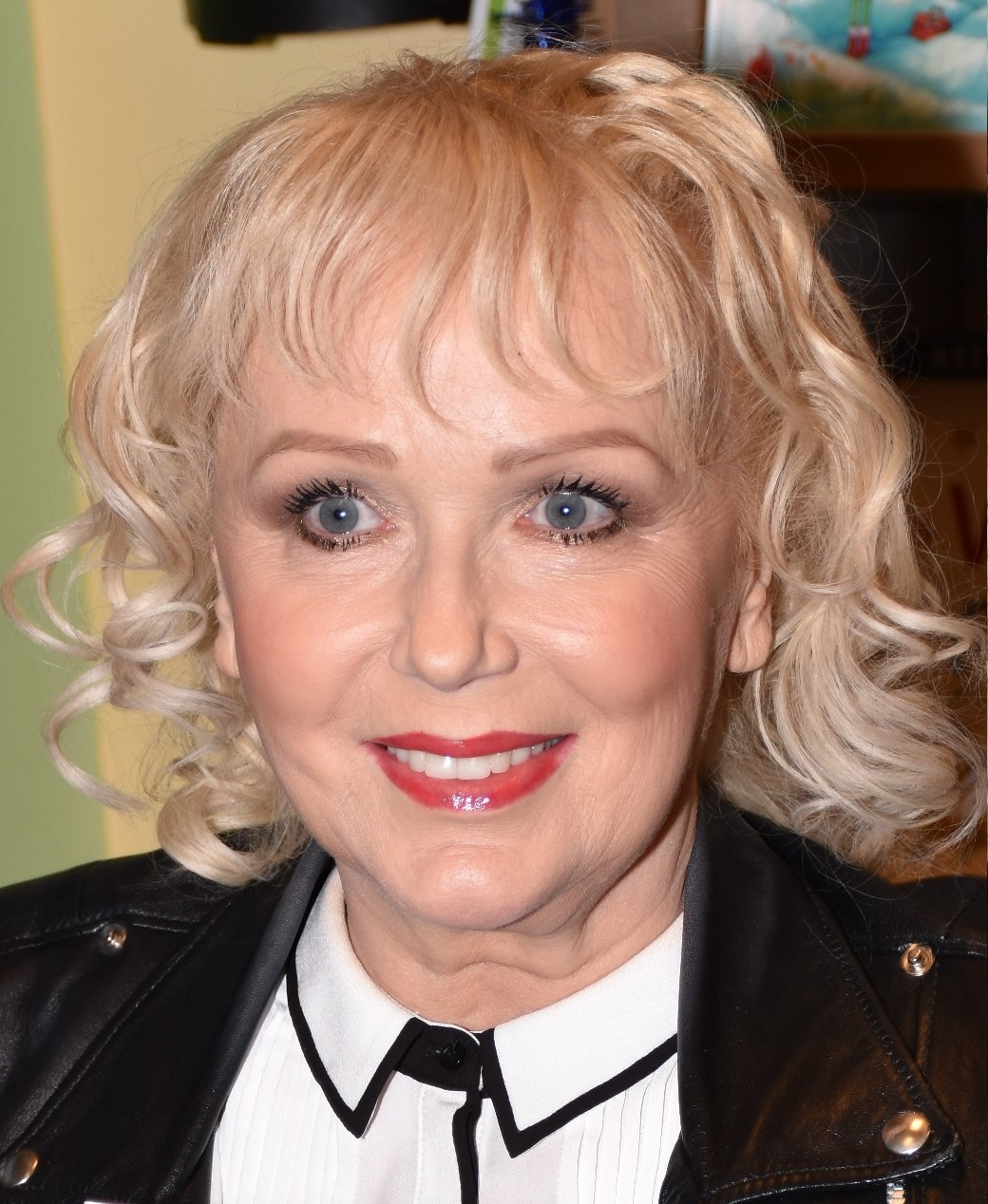
- Singer at Neoluxor book store in Prague, Czech Republic on 28 November 2016.
- Born: Mária Gombitová; 12 September 1956 (age 69); Turany nad Ondavou, CSSR
- Occupations: singer-songwriter; musician; author
- Years active: 1975–present
- Musical career
- Genres: Pop; rock; electronic
- Instruments: Piano; keyboard; guitar; harmonica; bongos; vocals
- Labels: OPUS; Jumbo; Universal; Monitor
- Website: marikagombitovaofficial.com

Marika Gombitová (Slovak: [ˈmarika ˈɡɔmbitɔʋaː]; born 12 September 1956) is a Slovak singer-songwriter and musician. Once a member of Modus, Gombitová started to gain early acclaim as a former female vocalist of the group. Nevertheless, she gradually developed her public image as a solo artist, making own debut on short play in 1977. Subsequently, after topping the local music charts with "Študentská láska" (1978), her debut set entitled Dievča do dažďa (1979) saw its eventual results on OPUS Records. The album's lead "Vyznanie", earned several music awards; most notably at the 4th Intervision Song Contest held in Poland (1980). In years to come later, the love anthem was to be celebrated as "The Hit of the Century" (2007) in her country.

Shortly before launching the second LP, Môj malý príbeh (1981), her career was adversely affected by a single-car crash. She was reliant on a wheelchair, possibly for life, due to the resulting multiple injuries. Following her partial recovery, Gombitová returned to the spotlight scoring new top rankings and even touring again. Her comeback album Slnečný kalendár (1982), continued with the previously established sound, such as mainly pop rock. Soon after that, she began to explore other styles too. While her guitar-based double effort Mince na dne fontán (1983), received the Gold Arms award as the best-selling record, its successor called №5 (1984) would find her experimenting with electronic music, giving Gombitová some of her strongest reviews, for a change.

More recently the singer has carried on achieving commercial success through a radio-friendly format. Her consecutively running synthpop outputs, such as Voľné miesto v srdci (1986) and Ateliér duše (1987), they both enjoyed a series of airplay hits, being accompanied with a sold-out concert tour and a video album release, respectively. Unlike Kam idú ľudia? (1990), which showcased a more rock-oriented sound and, eventually, it marked the end of the artist's prolific period of time. Gombitová however managed to sustain an indisputable level of popularity also off the scene. Prior to her long-term withdrawal from public life, she delivered on Jumbo Records Zostaň (1994), her final studio collection of pop tunes to date.

Gombitová is regarded in popular culture as a dominant figure whose influence reflect numerous awards and honorific titles to her credit. Besides, her contributions to the genre have made singer one of the most successful solo acts in the history of Slovak contemporary music, having six out of nine full-length records listed among The 100 Greatest Slovak Albums of All Time. In her homebase, she is often recognized as The Songstress of the 20th Century (2000), and has been quoted as an inspiration by various local artists since. Inducted into the ZAI Hall of Fame at the age of barely forty years, her work remains covered and a radio favorite in the region.

== Biography ==
=== Early life and recordings ===
"Koloseum"
One of the singer's most recognized songs from 1987. The lyrics stress her interrupted career, culminating in the chorus: Coliseum, glory to fall ▪ How many times time's come to halt ▪ A stone is glorious after all ▪ Coliseum, fame is a fall ▪ How many times time's come to halt ▪ The stone is famous on its own ▪ Above all alone

Marika Gombitová was born on 12 September 1956 in the village of Turany nad Ondavou, east Slovakia, as the seventh child of Michal (19 December 1913) and Margita (19 August 1921, née Novotňáková). However two of their older daughters – one of whom was already given the name Mária – died due to hypothermia. Since the age of nine, she was taking piano lessons in the local Ľudová škola umenia (LŠU) in Stropkov. Following her failure to study singing at the Music school, she continued with engineering in Košice. While on high school, she sang with an amateur band called Profily. Later she would shortly perform for the orchestras of Juraj Szabadoš and Július Olajoš, respectively.

In 1975, Gombitová made her first recordings ("Karta" and "Nájdem hviezdu") at Slovak Radio Košice. The next year, she received an offer from Janko Lehotský, frontman of the Modus band, to join his professional group. Following the leaving exam she, therefore, moved to Bratislava and got an initial exposure in Slovak Television with songs "Lúčenie" and "Túto pieseň spievam vám" (both co-written by Lehotský), performed in Chvíľa pre pesničku in 1976. At first, she would release a number of singles with Modus (such as "Veľký sen mora", "Margaréta", "Zažni" – all from 1977) as a backing vocalist. Her solo part came along with the Bratislavská lýra '77 winning composition "Úsmev" that featured also vocal contributions by Lehotský, Miro Žbirka and Miro Jevčák. Subsequently, Gombitová recorded her debut solo single entitled "Boľavé námestie." For the first time, her name appears in the national music poll Zlatý slavík, being ranked as the 46th Most Popular Female Singer in Czechoslovakia in 1977 (Modus scored at number #6).

=== "Študentská láska," "Vyznanie," Intervision prize and car crash ===
"There's no way to deal with this, and if someone claims such thing, you don't buy it."

— Gombitová on account of her suffered damages

The second solo single by Gombitová, "Študentská láska," was issued in 1978. The song won two awards at the Bratislavská lýra '78 festival, being classified as the most selling SP in July in Slovakia. She also recorded four tracks on the Motion Picture Soundtrack of Smoliari (issued in 1979), and her position in annual Zlatý slavík skyrocketed to number #4 this time (Next year she scored at #3, while at #2 in 1980). Following her contribution to the Collegium Musicum's full length project entitled On a Ona, Gombitová along with Modus was headed in February 1979 to the recording studio to work on their self-titled debut album. In addition, she would also release her own debut set Dievča do dažďa. With its pilot single "Vyznanie," Gombitová entered the 4th Intervision Song Festival held in Sopot, Poland on 20–23 August 1980. As a result, she received the first prize in the competition representing record companies, shared with Nikolai Gnatiuk from Russia (for the song "Dance on a Drum").

== Artistry ==
=== Voice and timbre ===
Prior to crash

"Muž Nula"
While continuing her musical evolution with Mince na dne fontán in 1983, singer helped popularize electronic musical instruments. In a more comprehensive manner to receive a synthesized voice in place of her own, she utilized vocoder for such tracks as "Skúška prvých šiat" and "Muž Nula".

With ambitus registered at F♯_{2}, Gombitová possesses an over two-octave vocal range and has the ability to reach notes beyond H_{2}, when using head register. In the early phase of her solo career, she underwent vocal training with coach František Tugendlieb, whose supervision included a broad range of her peers recording artists. Tugendlieb had become proverbial for dividing off head register from chest voice, allowing production of nasal tones, which resulted in a greasy-voiced sound distinctive for overtone singing, or rather children. As such it was popularized by Bee Gees. Unlike her later imitators (e.g. Darina Rolincová as the most notorious in the 1980s), Gombitová's vocal style was not similar to other pop stars of that period and she soon introduced her own modus, establishing herself as The Songstress of the Century in the 20th century.

Reactions to the "childlike quality" of her vocals changed with the release of her solo debut album Dievča do dažďa (1979). Peter Lipták praised Gombitová for "[her] beautifully metallic, a bit heavily-sounding voice", while František Horáček from Populár went in his superlative review even further when compared "[her] original, metallic-sharp timbre" to "the tonal compression of organ pipes". He would also emphasize her "absolutely extraordinary way to split a melody" and "phrasing that brings an outstanding tension – the bigger the slower is [her] composition". Other critics, such as one of the Czech most intransigent Jan Rejžek, he described Gombitová's voice as "circularly laserlike", and even later looked up to artist as a "self-sufficient and sovereign rival of Zlatý slavík-winning singers" who is aware when "to set toxic heights to make your flesh so longly-for creep – making it a party, instead public holiday". In response to her second set Môj malý príbeh (1980), record producer Július Kinček stated that writing about "[her] original vocal, excellent technique, sound sense for rock genre, flawless phrasing and great musicianship... [it] has already become by now bringing the wood to the forest". He also attributed much of her success to Gombitová's "admirable way to seize emotional tension of compositions on the first place". Nevertheless, Marián Jaslovský as the only criticized most of the singer's vocal outputs from the soundtrack Neberte nám princeznú (1980), and reportedly for her "traditionally artificial exhibition", which he saw unsupportive toward fluidity of Ursiny's songs.

After crash

"In Vyznanie I have one part in awful heights. That can't be managed just technically, I must put into it with all my body. As I [am to] sit, my strain is twice as big. Those tones hang above me before each concert."

— Artist about her tour de force internationally known as "Why (Must I Always Fail)?"

Following the crash, Gombitová lost perception over two-thirds of her bodily function including the lower part of her lungs, a significant area for breath control. She had to acquire a new vocal technique. The condition of her voice had seemed to be untouched and reviewers continued with being enthusiastic. Populár music columnist Dagmar Kolářová complimented Gombitová on her "singing artistry", no less her attitude for "expressive style" she delivered on her comeback album Slnečný kalendár (1982). Miloš Skalka of Mladá fronta praised her ensuing live performances on Mince na dne fontán Tour (1983) for "[her] excellent vocal dispositions and secure intonation". Život magazine, for a change, documented "the sincerity of [her] testimony, persuasiveness of [her] interpretation, which extends to simplicity." Author Vladimír Petr from Rytmus circumscribed her vocalizing in depth, pointing for the singer's voice out "[it] is none of average that would disturb, or attract. The other way around, [and] for which applies only two extreme options as maximum – either you accept it as it comes with its provocative metallic pitches and [her] girlish whisper, or you are not capable of listening to, due to all said attributes."

Over the course of her career, Gombitová's voice grew deeper and fuller as noticed by Populár in the middle of the 1980s. Ivan Kytka observed on her Adresa ja, adresa ty Tour (1985/87) that her "once thin laser voice gained new positions and keys", whereas he stressed that singer expanded her brand as a confident composer, too. Her 1990s vocal input for Kam idú ľudia? (1990) was seen less favorably by critics, which then blamed her album performances for artificiality, arbitrary phrasing, as well "language-rape" as written in Andrej Turok's review. Although, he did not disclaim Gombitová's constant "flawless intonation", or rather "[her] civilized singing" on down-tempo tracks, on the contrary. Since the 21st century, Gombitová has sung in her medium-ranged voice ("Nespáľme to krásne v nás" and "Tajnosľubná"), with exception of her higher register for the chorus ("Prosba"). Following several abortive efforts to encourage artist to return to the studios, the media began to speculate on a loss of her voice in 2004. Czech Právo printed a statement, upon which "[she] refuses to return to the spotlight in fear her triumphant comeback could turn into a total fiasco". Those guessings were turned down by her lifetime lyricist Kamil Peteraj, who stated for the press that "[her] problem does not concern [her] voice but psychic." His opinion confirmed ex-opera singer and vocal pedagogue Dagmar Livorová, however, she admitted herself that such injuries as of bottom sections of abdomen may result in a collapse when vocally performing. Žbirka, with whom Gombitová recorded two of her final recordings to date, finds difficult in essence to inspire artist with a new material.

=== Music videos and live performances ===
Music videos

Prior to the music video-era, which arrived with the MTV broadcast in the early 1980s in the US, Czechoslovak audience had no representative music channel focusing predominantly on playing music videos either afterwards. The local artists presented their work through imagery of various TV programs delivered on the state-owned network. Gombitová received her exposure on the national television on 30 November 1976, performing "Túto pieseň spievam vám" along with "Lúčenie" for Chvíľa pre pesničku. Two weeks later, on 11 December, she also appeared on the showbill of Vyberte si pesničku. This time around though, she introduced a song called "Ty vieš, mama", issued as B-side of her debut single that followed shortly. In 1978, her "Letná pieseň" found a rapport on additional televised charts, such as Našich 9, which she eventually topped with duet "S tou nádejou choď spať" featuring Lehotský. Needless to say, censorship had been a regular subject of intense debate during the red regime in her country and the communist party maintained to supervise lyrical content of all public recordings by means of then devoted committees. Gombitová thus would not gain a full control over her own creative outputs. At least until the perestroika's initial period that allowed more independent actions towards cultural field, including some market-like reforms similar to Western style.

Furthermore, her mobility impairment has led to herself being viewed as a physically disabled artist since 1981. It has largely impacted such aspects of her subsequent recording career as producing promotional video clips and, especially, her live performances. Nevertheless, singer would substantially contribute to the local music video even later. Her impact on the music video sphere equally document several wins of her songs on varied popular video charts, such as 5 x P and Triangel. While the first she entered with "Muž Nula" (1984), its successor served as instrumental to support her continual popularity in the region through additional number-one hits; namely "Zem menom láska" (1985), "Chlapci v pasci" (1986), "Koloseum" (1988) and "Paradiso" (1995) In an attempt to afford more visual liberties and enhance her recorded work with more striking video clips, Gombitová teamed up with director Ladislav Kaboš and Ján Ďuriš (credited as camera operator) in 1987. The "trio" crafted a video album entitled Ateliér duše, recognized as the first video release by any native-born artist. The videotape featured seven 35 mm films produced by Koliba Film Studios, six of which were to promote compositions from the corresponding studio album of the same title. In addition and before the dissolution of the federal state in the 1990s, Gombitová became on 20 June 1990 the first local singer to appear on the Austrian video chart Die Großen Zehn, presenting for ORF "Babylónia", the lead single from her Kam idú ľudia? set.

Live performances

== Discography ==
Studio albums

Solo

- 1979: Dievča do dažďa
- 1981: Môj malý príbeh
- 1982: Slnečný kalendár
- 1983: Mince na dne fontán
- 1984: №5
- 1986: Voľné miesto v srdci
- 1987: Ateliér duše
- 1990: Kam idú ľudia?
- 1994: Zostaň

With Modus

- 1979: Modus
- 1980: Balíček snov
- 1981: 99 zápaliek
- 1983: Záhradná kaviareň

English-language albums

- 1980: Modus with Modus
- 1981: Rainy Day Girl
- 1984: My Friend the Tree
- 1985: №5

== Filmography ==
| Year | Film | Role | Director(s) | Notes |
|---|---|---|---|---|
| 1978 | Smoliari | Mira (voice role) | Dušan Kodaj | Television musical |
| 1981 | Neberte nám princeznú | Katka | Martin Hoffmeister | Television musical |
| 1986 | Pa a Pi | (voice role) | Miroslav Sobota and Dalimil Koutek | Short TV miniseries |

== Tours ==
Solo

- 1983: Mince na dne fontán Tour
- 1985–87: Adresa ja, adresa ty Tour

With Modus

- 1977–78: Úsmev Tour
- 1978–80: Balíček snov Tour

As guest

- 2016: Road to Abbey Road Tour (with Miro Žbirka)

- 2016: Marika Gombitová a priatelia (one-off concert featuring also a tribute by other artists)
- 2017: Sen Mariky Gombitovej (upcoming one-off Christmas concert featuring also special guests)

== Books ==
- 2016: Úlomky spomienok (co-written with Miroslav Graclík)

== Legacy ==
=== Honors and awards ===
- Totals
| Awards won | 46 |
| Nominations | 124 |

"Guess you have realized I am not a racer but singer. I'm naturally glad about each success, but I don't suffer from the "Gold Nightingale" syndrome and [I] have no longing for aviaries."

— Singer commenting the public music poll

Marika Gombitová has received numerous awards and accolades in recognition of her success in the music industry. At the turn of the 3rd millennium, she was named The Songstress of the Century and her achievements in the music genre has made others to call her "The First Lady", or rather "The Queen of Slovak Pop Music", respectively. As of 2016, she has accumulated a total of 124 awards and/or nominations, and her list also includes a number of music recording certifications received for the sales of her studio albums. Her double win at the Bratislavská lýra in 1978 with "Študentská láska" became a significant milestone in her solo career, which led to the award's Silver equivalent in 1979 (for "Vyznanie"), and its Bronze in 1980 (in favor of her duet with Lehotský "Tajomstvo hier"). Prior to surviving her car crash, she received an Intervision award from the East European International Radio and Television Organisation in response to her live performance of songs "Vyznanie" and "Chcem sa s tebou deliť", accomplished in 1980 in Sopot, Poland. Besides, her signature song ("Vyznanie") won the countrywide competition run by Slovak public TV network in 2007 as The Hit of the Century.

In a career spanning more or less four decades, Gombitová had sold more than one million LP records in the vinyl era. On 2 March 1996 she became the first female performer, as well as one of the first inductees ever into the Hall of Fame by the ZAI Academy. She also holds the local record as the artist with the most releases listed among The 100 Greatest Slovak Albums of All Time. Six of her solo studio albums were ranked as some of those best and the overall index features also her vocal contribution to additional nominated releases, such as co-recorded with Modus and Žbirka, or delivered for Neberte nám princeznú soundtrack. Aside from her critical accomplishments, Gombitová has been frequently voted in national annual music poll Zlatý slavík and its subsequent equivalents, Slovenský slávik and Slávik Awards. While eventually winning two editions as Slovenský slávik (1997–1998), she topped eight times as the runner-up for the most popular Female Singer in the country; three times at Zlatý slavík (1980, 1982–1983), on five occasions for Slávik (1998, 2000–2002, 2005), despite showing no particular interest in accepting these recognitions. For her other cultural or lifetime achievements, she is also a recipient of the Main Prize by the Culture Ministry of the Czechoslovakia (1986), the Freedom of the City of her birth municipality (2007), as well of the town of Stropkov (2013) and, among others, The Woman of the Year title (2008) and the Hall of Fame OTO Award (2014).

In 2023 she became the laureate of the Special Crystal Wing Awards.

| Year | Nominated work | Award | Category |
1970s
| 1977 | "Úsmev" | Bratislavská lýra | Audience Choice |
| 1978 | "S tou nádejou choď spať" | Našich 9 | – |
| 1978 | "Studentenliebe" | Internationales; Schlagerfestival Dresden | Price of the State Committee for Radio at the Council of Ministers of the GDR |
| 1979 | Herself | Melodie | Best Female Singer |
1980s
| 1980 | "Vyznanie"/"Chcem sa s tebou deliť" | Intervision | Best Female Vocal Performance |
| 1983 | Herself | POPulár | Best Female Singer |
| 1984 | "Muž Nula" | 5 x P | – |
| 1985 | "Zem menom láska" | Zlatý triangel | Best Video |
| 1986 | "Chlapci v pasci" | Zlatý triangel | Best Video |
| 1986 | Adresa ja, adresa ty Tour | Ministry of Culture of the Czechoslovakia | Main Prize |
| 1986 | Adresa ja, adresa ty Tour | Ústí nad Labem National; Contest of Musical Programs | Audience Choice |
| 1986 | Herself | POPulár | Best Female Singer |
| 1987 | Herself | POPulár | Best Female Singer |
| 1987 | Ateliér duše | POPulár | Best Album |
| 1988 | Ateliér duše | Mladé rozlety | Best Album |
| 1988 | Herself | POPulár | Best Female Singer |
| 1988 | Herself | Central Committee of the Slovak Women Union | Gold Plaque |
| 1988 | "Koloseum" | Zlatý triangel | Best Video |
1990s
| 1995 | "Paradiso" | Zlatý triangel | Best Video |
| 1995 | Herself | Zlatá nota | Female Singer |
| 1996 | Herself | Zlatá nota | Female Singer |
| 1996 | Herself | ZAI Awards | Hall of Fame |
| 1997 | Herself | Slovenský slávik | Female Singer |
| 1998 | Herself | Slovenský slávik | Female Singer |
2000s
| 2000 | Herself | Songstress of the Century | – |
| 2001 | Herself | OTO Awards | Female Singer |
| 2007 | "Vyznanie" | Hit of the Century | – |
| 2007 | Herself | Freedom of the City | Turany nad Ondavou |
| 2008 | Herself | Bratislava Leaders | Woman of the Year |
2010s
| 2013 | Herself | Miková Festival of the Rusyns Culture | Lifetime achievement |
| 2013 | Herself | Freedom of the City | Stropkov |
| 2014 | Herself | OTO Awards | Hall of Fame |
| 2015 | Herself | Slovenka Awards | Special – Lifetime achievement |
Note: The years are listed in order of the respective calendar years; the annual ceremonies are usually held the next.

== See also ==
- Slovak popular music
- The 100 Greatest Slovak Albums of All Time
- Honorific nicknames in popular music
- List of singer-songwriters

== Bibliography ==
- Graclík, Miroslav; Nekvapil, Václav (2008). Marika Gombitová: neautorizovaný životní příběh legendy československé pop music [Marika Gombitová: An Unauthorized Life Story of the Legend of Czechoslovak Pop Music] (in Czech). Prague, Czech Republic: XYZ. p. 446. ISBN 978-80-7388-115-3. OCLC 294939865.
- Lehotský, Oskar (23 April 2008a). Slovak Popular Music in the Years 1977–1989 – Marika Gombitová (PDF) (in Slovak). Bratislava, Slovakia: Comenius University, Faculty of Arts. Archived from the original (PDF) on 14 July 2014.
- Lehotský, Oskar (23 April 2008b). Slovak Popular Music in the Years 1977–1989 – Modus (PDF) (in Slovak). Bratislava, Slovakia: Comenius University, Faculty of Arts. Archived from the original (PDF) on 19 August 2011.

Awards and achievements
| Preceded by Lenka Filipová with "Vyjdi ven" | Czechoslovakia in the Intervision Song Contest; 1980 | Succeeded by None |
| Preceded by (Poland) Czesław Niemen with "Nim przyjdzie wiosna" | Winner of the Intervision Song Contest; 1980 (tied with (Finland) Marion Rung & (Soviet Union) Mykola Hnatyuk) | Succeeded by (Tajikistan) Tahmina Niyazova with "Hero" |
