= List of Slovak musical groups =

This list contains an incomplete enumeration of Slovak bands, not including classical ensembles.

== A ==
- AMO
- Anthology
- April Weeps
- AYA

== B ==
- Banket
- The Beatmen
- The Bridgeheads
- Bruno Benetton Free Band

== C ==
- Collegium Musicum

== D ==
- Desmod
- Dzierzynski Bitz

== E ==
- Elán

== F ==
- Fun Master

== H ==
- Horkýže Slíže
- Hrdza

== I ==
- IMT Smile
- Iné Kafe

== K ==
- Kalijuge
- King Shaolin
- Kmetoband
- Kollárovci
- Kontrafakt
- Korben Dallas

== L ==
- The Last Days of Jesus
- Lobby
- Lojzo
- Longital

== M ==
- Majster Kat
- Malokarpatan
- Metalinda
- Modus
- Morna

== N ==
- No Name

== P ==
- Peha
- Prúdy

== R ==
- Rozpor

== S ==
- Signum Regis
- Ska2tonics
- Slobodná Európa
- The Soulmen

== T ==
- Taktici
- Team
- Tublatanka
- Twiins

== W ==
- Wayd

== Z ==
- Zóna A
