= Slovak popular music =

Popular music began to replace folk music in Slovakia beginning in the 1950s, when Slovakia was a part of Czechoslovakia; American jazz, R&B, and rock and roll were popular, alongside waltzes, polkas, and czardas, among other folk forms. By the end of the 1950s, radios were common household items, though only state stations were legal. Slovak popular music began as a mix of bossa nova, cool jazz, and rock, with propagandistic lyrics. Dissenters listened to ORF (Austrian Radio), Radio Luxembourg, or Radio Free Europe, which played more rock. Czechoslovakia was more passive in the face of Soviet domination, and thus radio and the whole music industry toed the line more closely than other satellite states.

After the Velvet Revolution and the declaration of the Slovak state, domestic music greatly diversified as free enterprise allowed a great expansion in the number of bands and genres represented in the Slovak market. Soon, however, major label brought pop music to Slovakia and drove many of the small companies out of business. The 1990s, American grunge and alternative rock, and Britpop gain a wide following, as well as a newfound popularity in musicals.

John Dopyera and his brothers, the inventors of the resonator guitar (DOpjera BROthers-Dobro, were born in Slovakia).

== Late 20th century's and today's musicians and music groups ==
=== Metal ===
- Achsar
- Algor
- Apoplexy
- April Weeps
- Bestialit
- Čad
- Dementor
- Depresy
- Doomas
- Editor
- Mystic Death
- King (SVK)
- Galadriel
- Laburnum Diver

=== Hardcore ===
- Flow
- Junk

=== Crossover Thrash ===
- Kershik

=== Hard Rock ===
- The Maybe
- Dorian Grey

=== Jazz Rock ===
- Fermata
- Dežo Ursiny

=== Rock ===
- Arzén
- Bez Ladu a Skladu
- Desmod
- Atlantída
- Elán
- Gladiator
- Good Fancy
- Free Faces
- HEX
- Chiki Liki Tu-a
- IMT Smile
- Le Payaco
- Metalinda
- Neuropa
- No Gravity (band)
- Out of Control
- TEAM
- Tublatanka
- Nocadeň
- Para

=== Art Rock ===
- Marián Varga
- The Bridgeheads

=== Pop Rock ===
- Peha
- Good Fancy
- Peoples
- Abscondo

=== Rap ===
- TCZY
- Terapia
- Drvivá menšina
- Čistychov
- Hanny
- PravyOpak
- Suchý pes
- L.U.Z.A.
- DK LUKY podzemie
- Miky Mora
- Názov Stavby
- Vec
- Zverina
- Veta a Orbit
- Rendezska SK
- Strnastka
- Druhá Strana
- Severná Strana
- Kontrafakt
- Gramo Rokkaz
- DMS
- Elpe
- BoyBand
- Moja Reč
- Rapuj Roger!

=== Punk Rock ===
- Iné Kafe
- Horkýže Slíže
- Horská Chata
- Plus Mínus
- Punkreas
- Zóna A
- HT
- Slobodná Európa
- Odpad
- Brickfield
- EX-tip
- DPH
- Davová Psychóza
- Prípad Ewy Burdovej
- Dimenzia X
- Konflikt
- Zhoda Náhod
- Dr.Pako
- Sitňan
- Mladé Rozlety
- Kóta 22
- Street Spirit
- Toy Pištols
- Pivnica
- D Zmrds
- Immunita
- Načo Názov
- Vandali
- Hasiaci Prístroj
- Kaktus
- Lord Alex
- Dissident
- Poďme do práce
- The Kľemones
- Metamorfóza
- Illegality
- Karpina
- Princovia
- Decis
- Bačova fujara
- Nekultúra
- Norton
- Punkhart
- Tri groše
- Strata času
- Začiatok konca
- S.R.O
- Živý plot
- Železná Kolóna
- Č.O.V.
- S.N.P.

=== Ska ===
- Polemic
- Ska2tonics
- Skaprašupina
- Hudba z marsu
- Lepayaco
- Vedro
- Bublifunk
- Fuera Fondo

== See also ==
- Music of Slovakia
- Slovak folk music
- Slovakia in the Eurovision Song Contest
- ZAI Awards
- The 100 Greatest Slovak Albums of All Time

== Samples ==
- Lunatic Gods - alternative metal band, which plays also some folk music instruments, like fujara and drumbla.
