= List of people from Cumberland, Maryland =

== List ==
This is a list of people from Cumberland, Maryland.

- Frederick John Bahr (1837–1885) – immigrant from Baden, Germany; bought Wills Mountain, including the narrows and Lovers Leap, to avoid the encroachment of the Civil War, settled there with his family in a cabin on the top of the mountain
- Rod Breedlove (1938–2021) – former football linebacker, played eight seasons in the National Football League with the Washington Redskins and the Pittsburgh Steelers, 1960–1967
- Earle Bruce (1931–2018) – football player and coach, most notably a head coach at Ohio State; inducted into the College Football Hall of Fame
- Wright Butler – architect of Allegany Courthouse
- Harry Clarke (1916–2005) – football player, two touchdowns in 1940 NFL Championship Game in Chicago Bears' 73–0 victory over Washington Redskins
- Kia Corthron (born 1961) – playwright, screenwriter; attended Allegany High School
- J. V. Cunningham (1911–1985) – poet, writer, and professor for Stanford University; born in Cumberland
- Alice Darr – jazz vocalist
- James Deetz (1930–2000) – father of historical archeology
- Eddie Deezen (born 1957) – comic and voice actor
- Jeanne R. Faatz (born 1941) – member of the Colorado State Legislature 1979–1998
- Jane Frazier – lived in a log house built in 1754 just outside Cumberland; was captured by Indians; a Frazier family member wrote a book about the incident, Red Morning
- Patrick Hamill (1817–1895) – U.S. congressman for Maryland's 4th District 1869–1871; buried in Odd Fellow's Cemetery
- Drew Hankinson (born 1983) – professional wrestler currently signed to WWE under name of Luke Gallows
- Christopher Hastings (born 1983) – comic artist and creator of The Adventures of Dr. McNinja, set in a fictional version of Cumberland
- Tom Hull (born 1952) – linebacker who played two seasons in National Football League with San Francisco 49ers and Green Bay Packers in 1974 and 1975
- Indian Will – well-known Native American who lived in a former settlement of the Shawnee Indians at the site of present-day Cumberland in the 18th century; namesake of Wills Creek and Wills Mountain
- Donnie Izzett (born 1975) – missing Frostburg State University student
- Ty Johnson (born 1997) – NFL running back for the Detroit Lions, the New York Jets, and currently with the Buffalo Bills
- Marianne Lake (born 1969) – CEO of Consumer Lending, JPMorgan Chase
- William Harrison Lowdermilk (1839–1897) – Union soldier, printer, and newspaper publisher
- William H. Macy (born 1950) – actor; attended Allegany High School, was junior and senior class president
- Samuel Magill – established the first newspaper in Cumberland, the Allegany Freeman, published weekly, 1813–1816
- Edward Mallory (1930–2007) – TV actor, director, drama professor
- Phil Mallow (born 1957), West Virginia state delegate
- Mark Manges (1956–2023) – quarterback for University of Maryland, College Park (1974–77); appeared on the cover of Sports Illustrated in October 1976
- John Van Lear McMahon (1800–1871) – Maryland legislator and historian
- Victorine Louistall Monroe (1912– 2006) – professor emerita of Library Science at West Virginia University
- Kelly L. Moran (born 1960) – author of book Shelley Chintz, 2001; designer and builder of the Stone Cottage; attended Bruce High School
- Edward Otho Cresap Ord (1818–1883) – born in Cumberland; designer of Fort Sam Houston; U.S. Army officer who saw action in the Seminole War, the Indian Wars, and the American Civil War
- Sam Perlozzo (born 1951) – former Major League Baseball player; former manager of the Baltimore Orioles (2005–2007); attended Bishop Walsh High School
- Bruce Price (1845–1903) – architect of Cumberland Emmanuel Church
- Francis Xavier Seelos (1819–1867) – pastor of SS. Peter & Paul's Catholic Church, 1857–1862, beatified by the Vatican in 2000 (final stage of canonization process)
- Russell Shorto (born 1959) – author of The Island at the Center of the World: The Epic Story of Dutch Manhattan and the Forgotten Colony that Shaped America and Amsterdam: A History of the World's Most Liberal City
- Casper R. Taylor, Jr (1934–2023) – member of House of Delegates, 1975–2003, speaker of the House, 1994–2003
- Three X Sisters – singing trio
- Steve Trimble (1958–2011) – pro football defensive back
- George L. Wellington (1852–1927) – U.S. senator
