= Labuda =

Labuda or Łabuda (Slovak feminine: Labudová) is a surname. Notable people with the surname include:

- Aneta Łabuda (born 1995), Polish handball player
- Barbara Labuda (born 1946), Polish politician
- Dušan Labuda, a founder of Slovak metal band Kalijuge
- Gerard Labuda (1916–2010), Polish historian
- Jeanne Labuda (c. 1947–2022), American politician
- Josef Labuda (born 1941), Slovak volleyball player
- Marián Labuda (1944–2018), Slovak actor
- Win Labuda (born 1938), German photographer
