= Kelly Moran =

Kelly Moran may refer to:

- Kelly Moran (speedway rider) (1960–2010), American male speedway rider
- Kelly Moran (musician), American female pianist
- Kelly L. Moran, American artist, author, and builder
