= Rumun =

Rumun may refer to:

- Rumun Ndur, Nigerian-born Canadian former professional ice hockey player
- Rumun, a musician of Rozpor, a Slovak punk band
- A nickname of several Polish locomotives literally meaning "Romanian" due to their Romanian origin, including:
  - PKP class SP32
  - PKP class ST43
- Rumun, fictional character from The Londoners (TV series)
- Rum'un, mascot of the Tasmania Football Club
