= Slobodna Europa =

Slobodna Europa (Slovak: 'Free Europe') may refer to:

- Radio Free Europe/Radio Liberty, a US-sponsored radio station
- Slobodná Európa, a Slovak punk-rock group formed in 1990
