= Morna =

Morna may refer to:

== Arts and entertainment ==
- Morna (music), a genre of Cape Verdean music
- Morna (band), a band from Slovakia
- Morna, the fictional town where the Estonian TV series Õnne 13 takes place

== Flora and fauna ==
- Morna (bug), a genus of insects in the family Pentatomidae
- Morna, a synonym for the plant genus Waitzia

== People ==
- Morna Hooker (born 1931), British theologian
- Morna Anne Murray (born 1945), Canadian singer
- Morna Nielsen (born 1990), New Zealand former cricketer
- Morna Stuart (1905–?), British writer and playwright
- Morna Wood (fl. 1915–1917), American politician

== Places ==
- Morna, Estonia, a village
- Morna River, Maharashtra, India
