= Live in Praha =

Live in Praha may refer to:

- Live in Praha, a 2010 live video of a 2009 Radiohead concert in Prague.
- Live in Praha (Iné Kafe video), 2009
