= Colorado's 1st House of Representatives district =

American legislative district

Colorado's 1st State House of Representatives district
Representative
Javier Mabrey; D–Denver
- Registration: 38.9% Democratic; 15.5% Republican; 43.7% No party preference
- Demographics: 42% White; 2% Black; 48% Hispanic; 5% Asian; 2% Multiracial
- Population (2021): 81,761
- Registered voters: 49,773

Colorado's 1st House of Representatives district is one of 65 districts in the Colorado House of Representatives. It has been represented by Democrat Javier Mabrey since 2023.

== Geography ==
District 1 covers southwestern Denver.

The district is located entirely within Colorado's 1st congressional district and overlaps with the 16th, 32nd, 34th districts within the Colorado Senate.

== List of members representing the district ==
Member	Party	Years	Counties Represented
Single member districts implemented 1969
Joseph V. Calabrese (Denver)	Democratic	1969 – 1970	Denver
Dennis Joseph Gallagher (Denver)	Democratic	1971 – 1972	Denver
Hubert Mayer Safran (Denver)	Democratic	1973 – 1974	Denver
Sam Hanna Zakhem (Denver)	Republican	1975 – 1978	Denver, Jefferson
Jeanne Ryan Faatz (Denver)	Democratic	1979 – 1998	Denver, Jefferson
Fran Coleman (Denver)	Democratic	1999 – 2006	Arapahoe, Denver, Jefferson
Jeanne Labuda (Denver)	Democratic	2007 – 2014	Arapahoe, Denver, Jefferson
Susan Lontine (Denver)	Democratic	2015 – 2022	Denver, Jefferson
Javier Mabrey (Denver)	Democratic	2023 – Present	Denver, Jefferson

== Recent election results ==
=== 2022 ===
2022 Colorado House of Representatives election, District 1
Primary election
Party	Candidate	Votes	%
Democratic	Javier Mabrey	7,305	100
Total votes		7,305	100
General election
Democratic	Javier Mabrey	17,903	64.80
Republican	Guillermo Diaz	8,981	32.51
Libertarian	Kyle Furey	743	2.69
Total votes		32,803	100
Democratic hold			

=== 2020 ===
2020 Colorado House of Representatives election, District 1
Primary election
Party	Candidate	Votes	%
Democratic	Susan Lontine	11,644	100
Total votes		11,644	100
General election
Democratic	Susan Lontine	22,584	66.36
Republican	Samantha Koch	11,448	33.64
Total votes		34,032	100
Democratic hold			

=== 2018 ===
2018 Colorado House of Representatives election, District 1
Primary election
Party	Candidate	Votes	%
Democratic	Susan Lontine	7,395	100
Total votes		7,305	100
General election
Democratic	Susan Lontine	17,400	64.00
Republican	Alysia Padilla	8,687	31.95
Libertarian	Darrell Dinges	1,099	4.04
Total votes		32,803	100
Democratic hold			

=== 2016 ===
2016 Colorado House of Representatives election, District 1
Primary election
Party	Candidate	Votes	%
Democratic	Susan Lontine	3,651	100
Total votes		3,651	100
General election
Democratic	Susan Lontine	17,474	61.04
Republican	Raymond Garcia	11,154	38.96
Total votes		28,628	100
Democratic hold			

=== 2014 ===
2014 Colorado House of Representatives election, District 1
Primary election
Party	Candidate	Votes	%
Democratic	Susan Lontine	3,002	100
Total votes		3,002	100
General election
Democratic	Susan Lontine	11,854	51.44
Republican	Raymond Garcia	8,109	35.19
Libertarian	David Hein	887	3.85
Independent	Jon Biggerstaff	675	2.93
Total votes		23,045	100
Democratic hold			

=== 2012 ===
2012 Colorado House of Representatives election, District 1
Primary election
Party	Candidate	Votes	%
Democratic	Jeanne Labuda	2,497	67.65
Democratic	Corrie R. Houck	1,194	32.35
Total votes		3,691	100
General election
Democratic	Jeanne Labuda	17,290	62.13
Republican	John Kidd	9,350	33.60
Libertarian	Mike Law	1,190	4.28
Total votes		27,830	100
Democratic hold			

=== 2010 ===
2010 Colorado House of Representatives election, District 1
Primary election
Party	Candidate	Votes	%
Democratic	Jeanne Labuda	3,851	100
Total votes		3,851	100
General election
Democratic	Jeanne Labuda	10,389	56.52
Republican	Danny E. Stroud	7,992	43.48
Total votes		18,381	100
Democratic hold			
