= Outer Calm, Pain Within =

Studio album by April Weeps
- Released: February 4, 2013
- Recorded: September – December 2012
- Studio: 999th Studio
- Genre: Post-metal, melodic death metal, gothic metal, groove metal
- Length: 48:45
- Language: English

Outer Calm, Pain Within is the debut album of the Slovak post-metal band April Weeps. It was recorded in 999th Studio in September - December 2012 and released on February 4, 2013. Physical copies of the album are limited and came with a 24-page custom booklet including lyrics created by Marius Sachticus.

== Track listing ==
No.	Title	Length
1.	"Sacrificial Rite"	4:28
2.	"Dream-Master"	4:05
3.	"Buried"	3:48
4.	"Outer Calm, Pain Within"	4:44
5.	"Forever Falling"	4:32
6.	"Shards"	6:57
7.	"Waiting for the Sun"	4:36
8.	"In a Hurry"	4:09
9.	"Positive Energy"	3:40
10.	"Faded Memory"	4:16
11.	"Pass Away"	3:30
