= Fran Coleman =

American politician (born 1945)

Frances (Fran) N. Coleman

Member of the Colorado House of Representatives from the 1st district
- In office January 1999 – 2006
- Succeeded by: Jeanne Labuda

Personal details
- Born: July 5, 1945 (age 81) Denver, Colorado, U.S.
- Party: Democratic
- Spouse: Ben Coleman
- Children: 2
- Education: (Masters) University of Denver
- Occupation: Politician

Frances (Fran) Natividad Coleman is an American politician. She is a former elected state representative from Colorado. A Democrat, she represented House District 1 in Southwest Denver from 1998 to 2006.

== Biography ==
Frances (Fran) Natividad Coleman was born in Denver, Colorado at St. Joseph's Hospital (Denver, Colorado) on July 5, 1945. She was placed in St. Joseph's Nursery Annex and then moved to a foster home on October 15, 1945. On August 6, 1946, Coleman was transferred to the Infant of Prague Nursery. On January 13, 1947, she was transferred to the Queen of Heaven Orphanage.

Responding to the call delivered by Father Domingo Morera, Coleman was adopted by her migrant parents Bacilio Natividad and Cliofas Gonzales Hernandez Natividad. The Natividads also adopted a son David as well. The adoptions were finalized in Weld County in 1950.

Coleman and her new family lived in Weld County on a farm located four miles northwest of Gilcrest, Colorado and four miles southwest of Milliken, Colorado.

Bacilio and Cliofas provided for their young family by boarding field workers on the farm while Bacilio followed the crops in Idaho, Wyoming, Arizona, and Colorado.

On January 2, 1952, Coleman's mother Cliofas died in an accident; Fran was six years old at the time.

After her mother's death, Coleman's father desperately tried to find childcare for his children while he was away working the crops, shepherding or working for the railroad. After six months of struggling, Coleman and her brother David eventually went to live with her aunt and uncle for stability. Her father returned from seasonal work every six months to visit.

When Coleman was a junior in high school her father Bacilio was killed in a hit and run accident. Fran graduated from Valley High School (Gilcrest, Colorado) in May 1964 as an honor roll student and received the Redmond Scholarship.

Upon graduation, Coleman moved to Denver to work for Mountain States Telephone and Telegraph as an entry-level clerk. She married in 1965 and moved to St. Louis, Missouri where she became a mother of two sons, Mitchell and Matthew. While in Missouri, she worked for Southwestern Bell and the Ferguson Police Department. The family moved back to Denver in 1969 and Fran resumed employment at Mountain States Telephone and Telegraph.

In 1979, Coleman maintained three jobs; manager at Mountain Bell, single mother and college student. She successfully worked her way through college earning a Business Administration Degree from Loretto Heights College in 1987. In 1993, Coleman earned a Master of Science in Telecommunications from the University of Denver. She worked in the telecommunications industry for 31 years eventually retiring in April 1998 in order to campaign for State Representative in House District 1.

Coleman has been a resident of the Harvey Park neighborhood since 1977. Coleman has two sons: Matthew and Mitchell Lopez. She is married to Ben Coleman, who has four adult children: Pam DiMarco, Steve, Craig and Wayne Coleman.

== Legislative career ==
=== Colorado State Representative, House District 1 ===
Coleman announced her candidacy for Colorado State Representative House District 1 on February 1. Her platform included three principle issues:

1. Education – The quality of public schools and adult literacy.
2. Transportation – Better roads and highways, cost effective commuter rail and efficient bus systems.
3. Environment – Sustainable water policies, stewardship of State Parks and natural resources.

Coleman was elected State Representative for House District 1, located in Arapahoe, Denver and Jefferson Counties, on November 3, 1998. She was re-elected in November 2000, 2002, and 2004.

=== Colorado General Assembly ===
Representative Fran Coleman was elected to the 62nd, 63rd, 64th and the 65th Colorado General Assembly. She served as a member of the following committees: Agriculture, Livestock, & Natural Resources; Business Affairs & Labor; Information & Technology; Transportation & Energy; Local Government; Finance; Health, Environment, Welfare, & Institutions; and State, Veterans, & Military Affairs.

- Appointed to the Joint Legislative Audit Committee, 2000 - 2006
- Chairwoman of Auto Insurance Interim Study Committee, 2005
- Chairwoman of Legislative Audit Committee, 2001
- Appointed as Commissioner on Information Management Commission, 2000 - 2006
- Chairwoman of IMC Policy Subcommittee, 2005-2006

=== Legislation ===
Representative Coleman was the primary sponsor of a total of 109 bills and resolutions. Of this number, 59 were House Bills, 35 were Senate Bills and 15 were either resolutions or memorials. Representative Coleman's foremost issues included public safety, education and consumer protection.

== Community service ==
As a teenager, Coleman was involved in giving back to the community. She volunteered teaching young mothers about the importance of nutrition for their babies, and became a "soccer mom" at her boys' school before the term was popular. She helped with their sports teams, provided transportation, snacks and support.

In 1979, she became the Chairwoman of Reading is Fundamental (RIF) at her sons' school and raised hundreds of dollars to buy books for inner-city children. For many, those were the first books they ever owned.

Coleman taught at her church and mentored teenagers and young adults in life skills. As Parish Council President, she spent numerous volunteer hours fundraising which in 1984 helped build a new church for Presentation of Our Lady.

While at US West, (now CenturyLink) she was the fundraising chairwoman that partnered with the Latin American Educational Foundation (LAEF), and provided thousands of dollars in scholarships to first generation students pursuing higher education. As a member of the Colorado Optometric Board, she spent many rewarding hours in leading efforts to provide glasses and services to the legally blind.

== Civic engagement ==
- Co-Chair Arts & Venues Transition Committee (Mayor-elect Michael Hancock (Colorado politician) Denver Forward) (2012)
- Denver Welfare Reform Board Appointed by Mayor Michael Hancock (Colorado politician) (2011–Present)
- Chair of Denver Welfare Reform Board (2011-2014)
- Denver Welfare Reform Board Appointed to by Mayor Bill Vidal (2010-2011)
- Ft. Logan Mental Health Institute Citizens Advisory Board Member (1999-2013)
- Denver Corrections Board Appointed by Mayor John Hickenlooper (2004-2009)
- Brain Injury Association of Colorado Board of Directors (2003-2007)
- Board Member of Southwest YMCA (2003-2006)
- LARASA Citizens Advisory Committee Chair (2005)
- LARASA Citizens Advisory Committee Member (1995-2005)
- Arapahoe County NAMI Board Member (2002-2005)
- Board Member for Association of Senior Citizens (2002-2005)
- Denver Corrections Board Appointed by Mayor Wellington Webb (1992-1997)
- SOMOS Vice-Chair, a US West Hispanics Group (1987-1989)
- Colorado Optometric Association Board Member for Visually Impaired (1983-1989)
- Volunteer and New Parish Fundraising, Presentation of Our Lady (1969-1989)
- SOMOS Treasurer a US West Hispanics Group (1984-1986)
- SOMOS Editor of "Las Noticias" a US West Hispanics Group (1983-1985)
- Reading is Fundamental (RIF) Fundraising Chair and
- School Coordinator for Presentation of Our Lady School (1979 -1982)
- Harvey Park Improvement Association Member (1977–Present)

== Awards ==
- Colorado Women's Hall of Fame, 2024
- Appreciation award -Denver Community Corrections Board, 2010
- Barbara S. Jacob Award, 2008
- 65th General Assembly Commemoration-State of Colorado, 2006
- Roger Cisneros Public Service Award, 2006
- Denver Women's Commission Legislator Appreciation Award, 2006
- Community Citizen Award-Garden Home Grange, 2005
- WILL/WAND Pacesetter National Award, 2005
- Chiropractors Legislator Advocate Award, 2003
- President's Award-Brain Injury Association of Colorado, 2003
- Thank You Recognition Brain Injury Association of Colorado, 2003
- Visual Welfare of Colorado Citizens Recognition-Colorado Optometric Association, 2002 & 2005
- Certificate of Appreciation-Governor's Mexico Trade Mission, 2001
- Community Health Center Advocate Award (CCHN), 2001
- Outstanding Legislator Award-Colorado Association of Family and Children Agencies, 2001
- Certificate of Appreciation-Latin American Research and Service Agency Board of Advisors, 2001
- Board Recognition Award-Association of Senior Citizens, 1999
- Legislator of the Year Award Colorado Adult Education Professional Association, 1999
- Colorado's Adoption Triad Community Recognition, 1999
- Dale Tooley Award, 1994

== Education ==
- Grant Writing Institute Workshop, Auraria Campus at Denver, CO (2007)
- Institute on Foreign Policy; Women's Studies, Rutgers University, Washington D.C. (2005)
- Fleming Fellows Institute, Center for Policy Alternatives, Washington D.C (2001)
- Colorado Institute of Leadership Training (CILT) (1996)
- Certificate of Government Contract Management, University of Phoenix, Denver, CO (1993)
- Masters of Science in Telecommunications, (University College) University of Denver, Denver, CO (1992)
- Federal Government Contracting Certificates, Washington University, Washington D.C. and San Diego, CA (1990)
- Business Administration Degree, Loretto Heights College, Denver, CO (1987)
- Certificate in Management, Loretto Heights College, Denver, CO (1985)
- Emily Griffith School, Shorthand I and II (1970)
- Valley High School, Gilcrest, CO, Redmond Scholarship (1964)
