= Jeanne Labuda =

American teacher, attorney, and politician from Colorado

Member of the Colorado House of Representatives from the 1st district
- In office January 10, 2007 – January 7, 2015
- Preceded by: Fran Coleman
- Succeeded by: Susan Lontine

Personal details
- Born: 1947 (age 78–79) Texas
- Died: July 25, 2022 Hampton, Virginia
- Party: Democratic
- Spouse: Michael D. Taber
- Education: University of Colorado, Boulder; Texas A&I University
- Occupation: Teacher, attorney, politician

Jeanne Labuda (c. 1947 – July 25, 2022) was a legislator in the U.S. state of Colorado. Elected to the Colorado House of Representatives as a Democrat in 2006, Labuda represented House District 1.

== Biography ==
=== Early career ===
After earning a bachelor's degree from Texas A&I University in 1968, Labuda worked for two and a half years as a Peace Corps volunteer in Liberia. She then taught for several years — working both as a high school teacher of English and government in South Texas and as a teaching assistant at the University of Texas at Austin. She has also worked as a claims representative for the Social Security Administration.

Labuda later earned a J.D. from the University of Colorado at Boulder in 1989 and served as a staff attorney for Liberty Mutual and TIG Insurance Company before becoming an assistant attorney general for the state of Colorado.

A resident of southwest Denver for over three decades, Labuda served as a board member and chair of the Harvey Park Improvement Association. She was also appointed by Mayor Wellington Webb as neighborhood liaison for southwest Denver, to the Denver Planning Board by mayors Webb and Peña, and to the community advisory board for Father Ed Judy House by Denver City Councilwoman Jeanne Faatz. She was president of the Denver Chapter of the American Association of University Women and a member of the executive committee for the Rocky Mountain Chapter of the Sierra Club.

A "life-long Democrat," Labuda was the Democratic party co-captain for House District 1, and ran unsuccessfully for the Denver City Council. Labuda was married; she and her husband, Michael Taber, had two children: Danica and Emily, who are both college graduates. They also had a son, Lukas, who died of SIDS when he was two years old.

== Legislative career ==
=== 2006 election ===
In 2006, Labuda sought the Democratic nomination for the open seat vacated by Rep. Fran Coleman, who unsuccessfully ran for the Colorado Senate. In the party primary, Labuda emphasized her experience in contrast with younger Denver deputy district attorney Alfredo Hernandez, who garnered endorsements from a number of sitting representatives. Labuda was able to spend more money in the primary, in part by loaning her campaign over $30,000, and won the nomination with around 60% of the vote.

In the general election, Labuda faced Republican paralegal Aimee Rathburn. In the only competitive Denver-area race, both candidates raised tens of thousands in the Democratic-leaning district. Labuda was endorsed by the Denver Post, but not the Rocky Mountain News. In the end, Labuda prevailed with 55% of the vote.

=== 2007 legislative session ===
During the 2007 session of the Colorado General Assembly, Labuda served on the House Finance Committee, the House Health and Human Services Committee, and the House State, Veterans, and Military Affairs Committee.

Labuda focused on health care in the bills she introduced during her first legislative session; her most contentious bill proposed to regulate naturopathic physicians in response to several high-profile deaths associated with naturopathic practitioners with dubious credentials. The bill was opposed by the Colorado Medical Society, and supported by the Colorado Association of Naturopathic Physicians. After extensive debate, Labuda, citing unresolved issues, asked for its postponement.

=== 2008 legislative session ===
During the 2008 session of the Colorado General Assembly, Labuda sat on the House Finance Committee and the House State, Veterans, and Military Affairs Committee, as well as the Joint Legal Services Committee.

Labuda sponsored legislation to protect the child custody rights of Colorado National Guard troops and military reservists deployed for active duty. She also re-introduced her bill to license naturopathic physicians; it was again opposed by the Colorado Medical Society.

=== 2008 election ===
Labuda filed to run for a second term in the Colorado House of Representatives; she faced no challengers for the Democratic nomination, and faced Republican Tom Thomason in the November 2008 general election.

Labuda's re-election bid was endorsed by the Denver Post; she prevailed with 59 percent of the popular vote.

=== 2009 legislative session ===
For the 2009 legislative session, Labuda was named to seats on the House Agriculture and Natural Resources Committee and the Legislative Legal Services Committee, and was named vice-chair of the House State, Veterans, and Military Affairs Committee.

=== 2010 legislative session ===
During the 2010 session of the Colorado General Assembly, Labuda served on the House Finance Committee and as the vice-chair of the House State, Veterans, and Military Affairs Committee.

=== 2010 election ===
Labuda ran for her third term in the November 2010 general election against Republican Danny E. Stroud. She won the election with 56.3% of the vote.

=== 2011 legislative session ===
For the 2011 session, Labuda served on the House Finance Committee. She was also a member of the Task Force on Mental Illness in the Criminal Justice System and the Police Officers' and Firefighters' Pension Reform Commission.

=== 2012 legislative session ===
For the 2012 session of the Colorado General Assembly, Labuda serves on the House Finance Committee and the House Local Government Committee. She also sits on the Committee on Legal Services, the Task Force on Mental Illness in the Criminal Justice System, and the Police Officers' and Firefighters' Pension Reform Commission.

=== 2012 election ===
In the 2012 General Election, Representative Labuda faced Republican challenger John Kidd. Labuda was reelected by a margin of 62% to 34% with the remaining 4% going to libertarian candidate Mike Law.

=== 2015 election ===
In 2015 Jeanne Labuda ran for Denver City County District 2. "I'm running for Denver City Council because I want to maintain a legacy of commitment to the citizens of District 2 and bring my financial and budgetary acumen to the Denver City Council."
