= Susan Lontine =

American politician

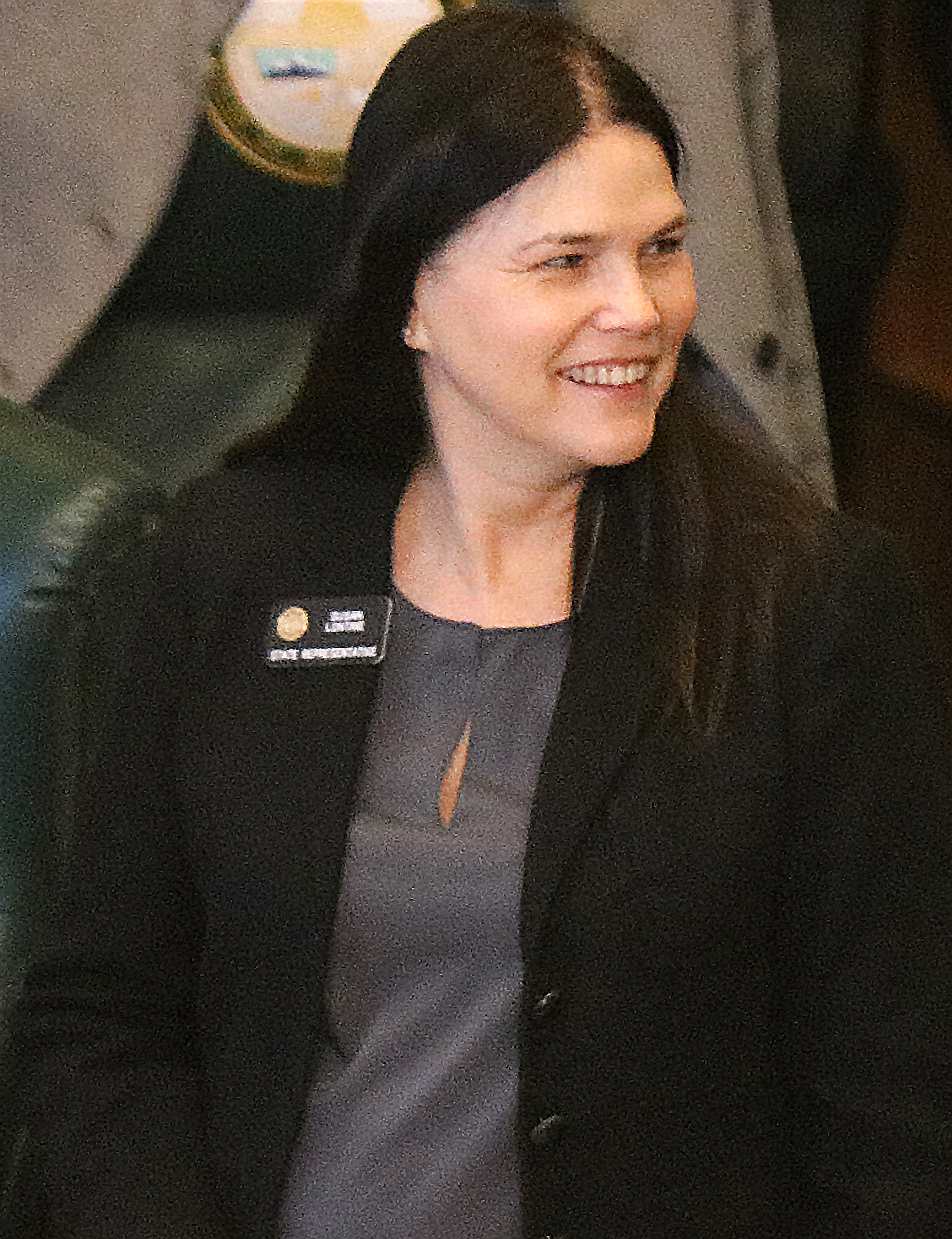

Member of the Colorado House of Representatives from the 1st district
- In office January 7, 2015 – January 9, 2023
- Preceded by: Jeanne Labuda
- Succeeded by: Javier Mabrey

Personal details
- Born: Lakeland, Florida, U.S.
- Party: Democratic
- Spouse: Chuck Lontine
- Education: University of Central Florida (BA)

Susan Lontine is an American politician who served in the Colorado House of Representatives from the 1st district as a member of the Democratic Party.

Lontine was born in Lakeland, Florida, and educated at the University of Central Florida. She served as a precinct captain for four years, worked in Representative Jeanne Labuda's office, and as the chief of staff for Senator Irene Aguilar. She was elected to the state house in the 2014 election. During her tenure in the state house she served as the chair of the Health and Insurance Committee and accused Senator Larry Crowder of sexual harassment.

== Early life and education ==
Lontine was born in Lakeland, Florida, and graduated with a Bachelor of Arts degree in journalism at the University of Central Florida. She moved to Pennsylvania and married Chuck Lontine, with whom she had two children, and later moved to Denver in 1996. She was a precinct captain in the 1st district of the Colorado House of Representatives for four years, worked in Representative Jeanne Labuda's office, and as the chief of staff for Senator Irene Aguilar.

== Colorado House of Representatives ==
Campaign logo

Lontine ran for the Democratic nomination for a seat in the state house from the 1st district and won in the 2014 election against Republican nominee Raymond Garcia, Libertarian nominee David Hein, and independent candidate Jon Biggerstaff. She defeated Garcia in the 2016 election. She defeated Republican nominee Alysia Padilla and Libertarian nominee Darrell Dinges in the 2018 election. She won reelection in the 2020 election against Republican nominee Samantha Koch.

During her tenure in the state house she served on the Veterans and Military Affairs committee and as chair of the Health and Insurance Committee. She accused Senator Larry Crowder of sexual harassment and filed a formal complaint against him in November 2017, stating that he had pinched her butt in 2015, and made an inappropriate sexual comment. She supported Hillary Clinton during the 2016 Democratic presidential primaries and Elizabeth Warren in the 2020 primaries.

== Political positions ==
Lontine voted against anti-BDS legislation stating that it was a violation of the First Amendment to the United States Constitution. She supported removing the phrase "illegal aliens" from existing laws. She received an A rating from NARAL Pro-Choice America. Lontine was among thirty-seven legislators who endorsed a letter in 2018, calling for Planned Parenthood to allow for their workers to form a union.

== Electoral history ==
2014 Colorado House of Representatives 1st district election
Primary election
Party	Candidate	Votes	%
Democratic	Susan Lontine	3,002	100.00%
Total votes		3,002	100.00%
General election
Democratic	Susan Lontine	11,854	55.07%
Republican	Raymond Garcia	8,109	37.67%
Libertarian	David Hein	887	4.12%
Independent	Jon Biggerstaff	675	3.14%
Total votes		21,525	100.00%

2016 Colorado House of Representatives 1st district election
Primary election
Party	Candidate	Votes	%
Democratic	Susan Lontine (incumbent)	3,651	100.00%
Total votes		3,651	100.00%
General election
Democratic	Susan Lontine (incumbent)	17,474	61.04%
Republican	Raymond Garcia	11,154	38.96%
Total votes		28,628	100.00%

2018 Colorado House of Representatives 1st district election
Primary election
Party	Candidate	Votes	%
Democratic	Susan Lontine (incumbent)	7,395	100.00%
Total votes		7,395	100.00%
General election
Democratic	Susan Lontine (incumbent)	17,400	64.00%
Republican	Alysia Padilla	8,687	31.95%
Libertarian	Darrell Dinges	1,099	4.04%
Total votes		27,186	100.00%

2020 Colorado House of Representatives 1st district election
Primary election
Party	Candidate	Votes	%
Democratic	Susan Lontine (incumbent)	11,644	100.00%
Total votes		11,644	100.00%
General election
Democratic	Susan Lontine (incumbent)	22,584	66.36%
Republican	Samantha Koch	11,448	33.64%
Total votes		34,032	100.00%
