= Stone Cottage =

House in Cumberland, Maryland, United States

Coordinates: 39°32′31.75″N 78°53′31.95″W

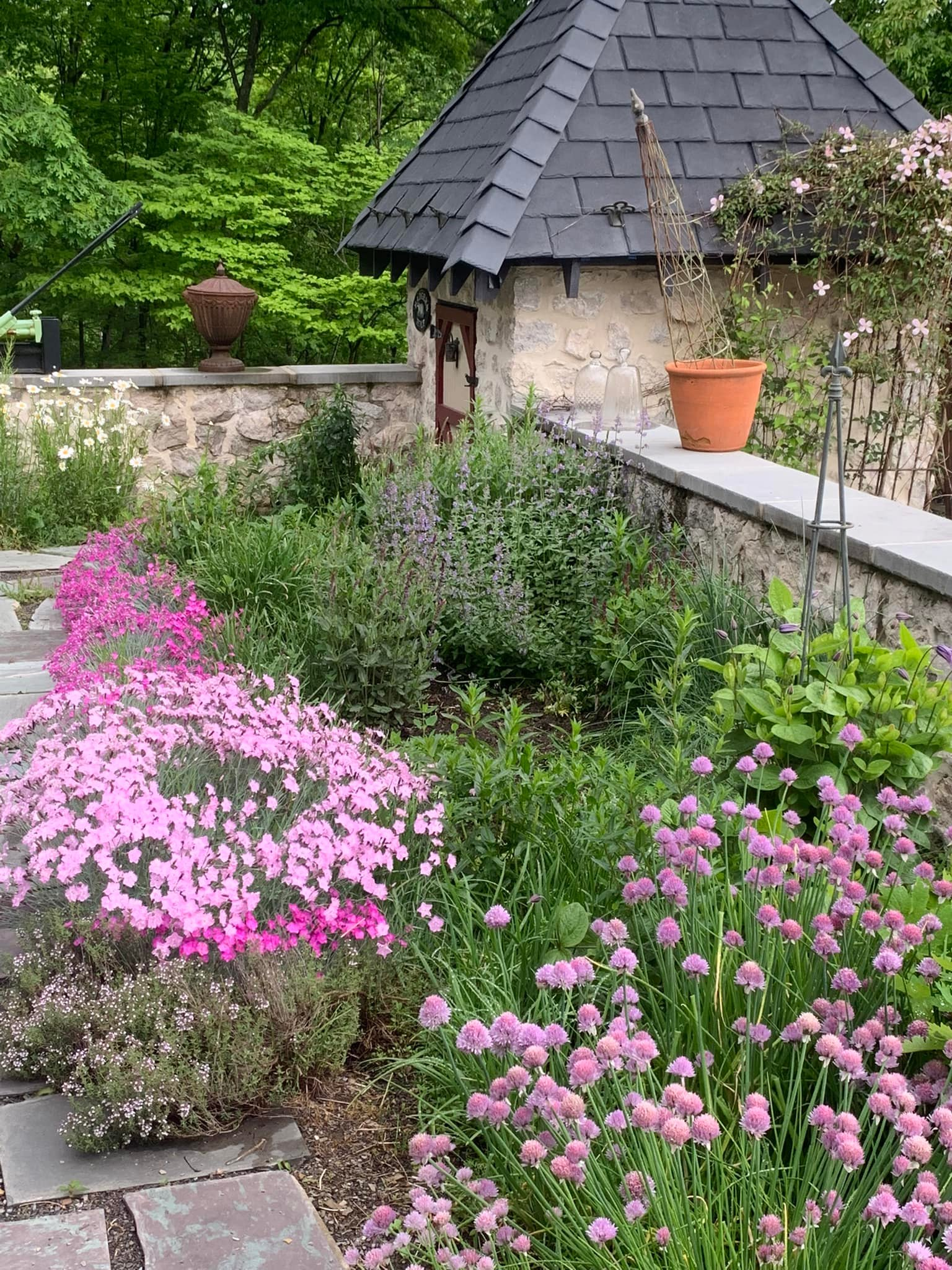

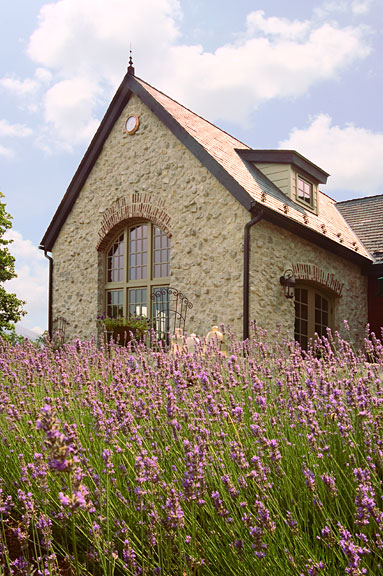
The Stone Cottage

The Stone Cottage is a 2006 Country-French inspired home near Cumberland, Maryland, designed and built by Kelly L. Moran.

Built using white limestone, a traditional material commonly found in France and not native to the Eastern United States, a slate roof and post-and-beam construction gives this home the appearance of an old medieval structure when in fact it was completed in 2006. The exterior of the Stone Cottage uses a technique called "Slush & Brush" that was employed thousands of years ago, using a wood paddle instead of a trowel and not raking back the joints. The Stone Cottage is only 1,800 square feet (170 m^{2}) and features an open plan Great Room where the kitchen, dining area and living room are located.

Interior of The Stone Cottage

The open plan design allows for a family to experience 'connected space' instead of being in separate rooms in a home

Moran is an advocate of smaller "cozy house" design. Quoted in the Washington Post AT HOME Magazine, Moran talks of smaller homes being a current trend in the US residential building market.

The Stone Cottage has been featured in several magazines. It is a private residence.
