= Javier Mabrey =

American politician

Member of the Colorado House of Representatives from the 1st district
- Incumbent
- Assumed office January 9, 2023
- Preceded by: Susan Lontine

Personal details
- Party: Democratic
- Education: University of Colorado Boulder; University of California, Berkeley

Javier Mabrey is an American politician. He serves as a Democratic member for the 1st district of the Colorado House of Representatives.

== Life and career ==
Mabrey attended the University of Colorado Boulder and the University of California, Berkeley.

In 2022, Mabrey defeated Guillermo Diaz and Kyle Furey in the general election for the 1st district of the Colorado House of Representatives, winning 64 percent of the votes. He assumed office in 2023.
