= Svätá Zvrhlosť =

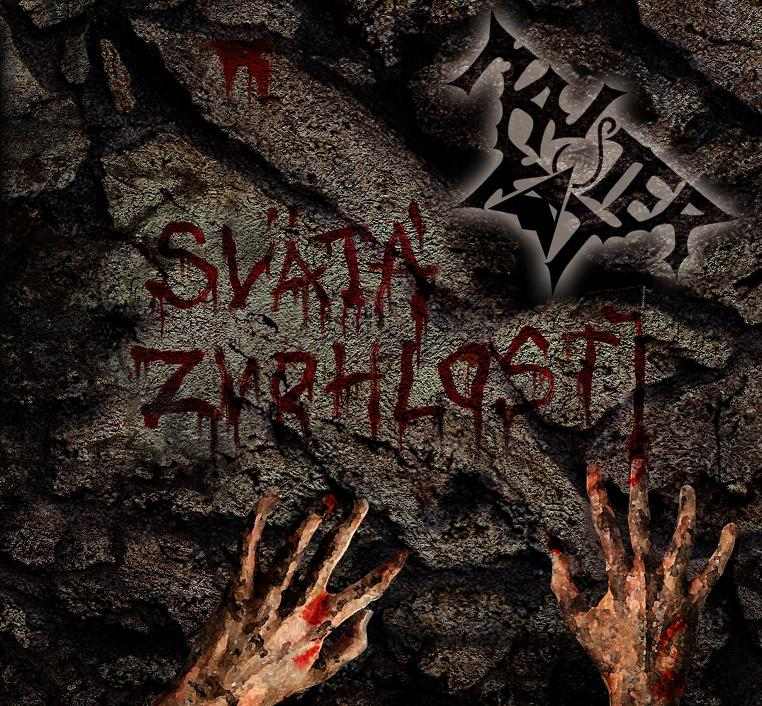

Studio album by Majster Kat
- Released: October 24, 2007
- Recorded: April – May 2007 at Midnight Scream Studio, Slovakia
- Genre: Thrash metal
- Length: 52:47
- Label: Panda Music

Svätá Zvrhlosť ("Depravity of The Pious") is the first official album of Slovak thrash metal band Majster Kat, released on October 24, 2007 on the Panda Music label.

== Review ==
=== Musical description ===
The album contains 12 tracks. The CD attracts by frequent changing of moods. It contains fast thrash metal songs with melodic lines as well as atmospheric instrumental songs with acoustic guitar passages.

=== Lyrical themes ===
All lyrics are in Slovak and concern the absurdity of the inquisition era and inhumanity of armed conflicts.

== Track listing ==
1. "Zapáľte ohne" (Music: Los, Lukáš/Lyrics: Slymák)
2. "Pod gilotínou" (Music: Los, Tapyr/Lyrics: Slymák)
3. "Kat" (Music: Los, Gabo /Lyrics: Slymák)
4. "Tieň minulosti" (Music: Los /Lyrics: Slymák)
5. "Pád" (Music: Gabo, Los /Lyrics: Slymák)
6. "Večný odpočinok" (Music: Los)
7. "Smutný odkaz" (Music: Los, Lukáš /Lyrics: Slymák)
8. "V údolí včiel" (Music: Gabo, Los /Lyrics: Slymák)
9. "Vláda šakalov" (Music: Los, Gabo /Lyrics: Slymák)
10. "Začiatok konca" (Music: Gabo, Los)
11. "Posledný deň" (Music: Los, Gabo /Lyrics: Slymák)
12. "Toľko nevinných..." (Music: Los)

== Personnel ==
- Slymák - vocals
- Los - lead guitar, backing vocals
- Lukáš - guitar
- Tapyr - bass, backing vocals
- Bubonix - drums
