= Smoliari =

1978 soundtrack album

Soundtrack album by Various artists
- Released: 1979
- Recorded: 1978
- Genre: Big beat; pop
- Length: 35:03
- Label: OPUS (#9116 0743)
- Producer: Milan Vašica

Smoliari (English: Unlucky Fellows) is the soundtrack from the 1978 television film of the same name, directed by Dušan Kodaj. The compilation released as the first original picture soundtrack in the country of origin was issued in 1979 on OPUS Records, with featuring songs written by Ali Brezovský and Kamil Peteraj. Among artists who contributed to the project were Marika Gombitová and Miro Žbirka.

== Track listing ==
All tracks are written by Brezovský and Peteraj.

No.	Title	Featured artist(s)	Length
1.	"Na svete je jedna škola"	Miroslav Žbirka, Július Mikeš, Milan Markovič and Bezinky	2:52
2.	"Sme tie známe postavy"	Bezinky and Taktici	2:19
3.	"Máme svoje tajné plány"	Marika Gombitová and Bezinky	2:36
4.	"Padla jedna postava"	Bezinky
5.	"Moje milé, drahé myši"	Markovič	2:00
6.	"V umení som znalec"	Zora Kolínska and Bezinky	3:00
7.	"Mám rád iba husličky"	Mikeš	2:01
8.	"S pesničkou na brigádu"	Bezinky and Taktici	3:05
9.	"Kam vedú cesty"	Magda Medveďová and Peter Hečko	2:45
10.	"Správne dievča"	Gombitová and Bezinky	3:00
11.	"Keby som tak raz"	Žbirka	3:04
12.	"Keby sa len trochu o mňa bál"	Gombitová and Bezinky	3:23
13.	"Tajná šťastná hviezda"	Gombitová and Žbirka	3:04
14.	"Záverečná pieseň"	Bezinky
Total length:			35:03

== Official releases ==
- 1979: Smoliari, LP, MC, OPUS, #9116 0743
- 1995: Smoliari a iné, CD, re-release (bonus tracks), Open Music #0038 2311

== Credits and personnel ==
- Ali Brezovský - music, conductor
- Kamil Peteraj - lyrics
- Miroslav Žbirka - lead vocal
- Július Mikeš - lead vocal
- Milan Markovič - lead vocal
- Marika Gombitová - lead vocal
- Zora Kolínska - lead vocal
- Magda Medveďová - lead vocal
- Peter Hečko - lead vocal
- V.V. Systém - performer
- Bezinky - chorus
- Taktici - chorus
- Milan Vašica - producer
- Vladimír Valovič - music director
- Peter Hubka - sound director
- Ľuboš Klásek - technical coordinator
- Ján Meisner - cover

== Awards ==
Ali Brezovský received for the composed music an award in 1978.

== Smoliari a iné ==
Smoliari a iné

Compilation album by Various artists
- Released: 1995
- Recorded: 1978
- Genre: Big beat; pop
- Length: 65:21
- Label: Open Music (#0038 2311)
- Producer: Milan Vašica

A re-issue of the album, enhanced with bonus tracks was entitled Smoliari a iné (English: Unlucky Fellows and the Others), was released on Open Music in 1995.

=== Track listing ===
All tracks are written by Brezovský and Peteraj, except for the track 14 (Brezovský and Mikletič).

No.	Title	Featured artist(s)	Length
1.	"Na svete je jedna škola"	Miroslav Žbirka, Július Mikeš, Milan Markovič and Bezinky	2:52
2.	"Sme tie známe postavy"	Bezinky and Taktici	2:19
3.	"Máme svoje tajné plány"	Marika Gombitová and Bezinky	2:36
4.	"Moje milé, drahé myši"	Markovič	2:00
5.	"V umení som znalec"	Zora Kolínska and Bezinky	3:00
6.	"Mám rád iba husličky"	Mikeš	2:01
7.	"S pesničkou na brigádu"	Bezinky and Taktici	3:05
8.	"Kam vedú cesty"	Magda Medveďová and Peter Hečko	2:45
9.	"Správne dievča"	Gombitová and Bezinky	3:00
10.	"Keby som tak raz"	Žbirka	3:04
11.	"Keby sa len trochu o mňa bál"	Gombitová and Bezinky	3:23
12.	"Tajná šťastná hviezda"	Gombitová and Žbirka	3:04
Total length:			33:09

Bonus tracks
No.	Title	Featured artist(s)	Length
13.	"Priateľ"	Vlado Kolenič and Taktici	2:58
14.	"Prázdninová pieseň"		3:10
15.	"Na rukách"		3:30
16.	"Kamarát vietor"		3:40
17.	"Let"	Mirka Brezovská	4:06
18.	"Kone"	Karol Duchoň	3:05
19.	"Leto v nás"		2:05
20.	"Láskavá láska"		3:05
21.	"Príma parta"		3:25
22.	"Kamaráti spáči"		2:35
Total length:			65:21

=== Additional credits and personnel ===
- Vlado Kolenič - lead vocal
- Mirka Brezovská - lead vocal
- Karol Duchoň - lead vocal
