= King Shaolin =

Slovak pop band

- Origin: Bratislava, Slovakia
- Genres: Pop, new wave
- Years active: 2011–present
- Members: Domi Stoff; Michal Neffe; Peter Áč; Lukáš Vajda
- Past members: Michal Uličný, Michal Skácel, Norbert Neuschl
- Website: www.kingshaolin.com

King Shaolin are a four-piece new-age pop band. Formed in Bratislava, Slovakia in 2011, the band consists of Domi Stoff (lead vocals and guitar), Michal Neffe (back vocals, guitar, percussions), Peter Áč (back vocals, bass) and Lukáš Vajda (drums). The band's debut album "Road to the Machiavelli Valley" was released 15 December 2012.

== Members ==
- Domi Stoff – lead vocal, guitar
- Michal Neffe – back vocals, guitar, percussions
- Peter Áč – back vocals, bassguitar, percussions
- Lukáš Vajda – drums, percussions

== History ==
New-Age Popsters KING SHAOLIN announce the release of their highly anticipated new album Road To The Machiavelli Valley out December 15, 2012. Recorded in Bratislava, Slovakia and mixed in Los Angeles with producer Nathan Lively (Zé dos Frangos, Bruno Benetton Free Band, etc.), the album features 12 original tracks written by Domi Stoff. King Shaolin offer a fresh take on the term soul-pop. The first single "Never Knows" was featured on MTV Czech Republic. The second single "Japan" was featured on Rádio FM. Music video for the song "Japan" has been made by Malcolm Tan from Singapore and Janka O´ska from Slovak Republic. In 2013 King Shaolin extensively toured across Europe, playing a total of 140 shows. In January 2014 the band became the official touring band for artist Celeste Buckingham. In October 2014 they released single "Friend", which featured daily on Fun Rádio. In June 2015 KING SHAOLIN won second prize at the CARPATHIA FESTIVAL – International song contest in Rzeszow (Poland). Domi Stoff also received a prize for best song composition. March 2016 the band released single "Money In My Soul", featured daily on Europa 2 radio. In March 2017, the band released their second studio album PLAY AGAINST THE RULES. They also announced a four-week KING SHAOLIN MARESI tour to support the record, March 2017. 2018 King Shaolin with Celeste Buckingham played like and opening act on Aerodrome festival. August 2019 the band performed with Celeste Buckingham at the Sziget Festival. 2019 the band released EP Venus Versus Mars and toured cross the country to promote the tour and the EP. First single Dead Man's Heart. a featuring song made with the Czech famous singer Lenny, the song gets to the daily rotation at multiple radio stations in Slovakia. In March 2020, the band released their third studio album Mind Game. And in 2023 King Shaolin as touring band for Celeste Buckingham shared the stage at the Lovestream Festival in Bratislava.

== King Shaolin as an opening act ==
- N.O.H.A.: Košice – Kasárne Kulturpark, 2014
- Lavagance: Liptovský Mikuláš – Vila Dr. Emila Stodolu, 2014
- Alice Merton: Bratislava – MMC, 2018

== Discography ==
- 2012 Road To The Machiavelli Valley (CD)
- 2014 Friend (Single)
- 2016 Burn Inside (EP)
- 2017 Play Against The Rules (CD)
- 2019 Venus Versus Mars (EP)
- 2020 Mind Game (CD)
- 2024 Take Me By The Hand (EP)
