= Taktici =

Slovak rock band

- Genres: Rock
- Years active: 1977–1979
- Members: Taktici; Vlado Kolenič; Milan Grožaj; Július Mikeš; Štefan Peller; Nový al-bum First Tribute Band; Dušan Brachna; Peter Surový; Tibor Čech

Taktici is a Slovak music group, established in 1977. In 1979 they defected to the US and in 1982 they went their separate ways.

== History ==
Taktici started their musical career in Bratislava's famous V-klub in 1970s. They played original melodic songs with controversial Slovak lyrics. In just three years from 1977–1979 they produced songs that withstood the advance of time and generations. Whats amazing is that even though their songs were played on the radio they’ve never been released on records. What’s even more incredible is that some songs that haven’t been played anywhere became cult hits. In 1979 they were invited to UK to take part in Gary Glitter show. When the communist government of Czechoslovakia cancelled their tour, three members Vlado Kolenič, Július Mikeš, and Štefan Peller decided to immigrate to USA. Everything associated with TAKTICI was banned. Songs were taken off the radio and anyone connected with the band was interrogated. After fall of the Berlin wall they were resurrected. Songs were back on the radio but the band never returned to Slovakia. In May 2013 the original band members reunited in New York City for a reunion show. It was attended by more than 300 people, most of them Slovak-Americans

== Discography ==
Studio albums

- 1980: Taktici
- 1991: 10 dkg tresky (as Vlado Kolenič)
- 1992: Blázni (as Tribute band Nový al-bum)
- 2000: Taktici 2000 (as Tribute band Nový al-bum)
- 2002: Taktici 2002 (as Tribute band Nový al-bum)
- 2005: Taktici Tribute band 2005
- 2005: SK HITY 2
- 2007: Taktici Tribute band 2007 (Imidž je nanič, keď ležíš na cintoríne)

Compilations

- 1997: Taktici (1977–1997)
- 2004: Taktici Tribute band 2004 (The Best Of)
- 2006: TOP FUN HITY 5, vol.5

Singles

- 1978: "Predavačka langošov"
- 1979: "Tanečník" (Taktici)

Other appearances

- 1979: Smoliari (soundtrack by various artists)
- 1995: Smoliari a iné (soundtrack by various artists, reissue)
- 2005: SK hity 2 (compilation by various artists)

== See also ==
- Slovak popular music
