= Kollárovci =

Slovak folk music band

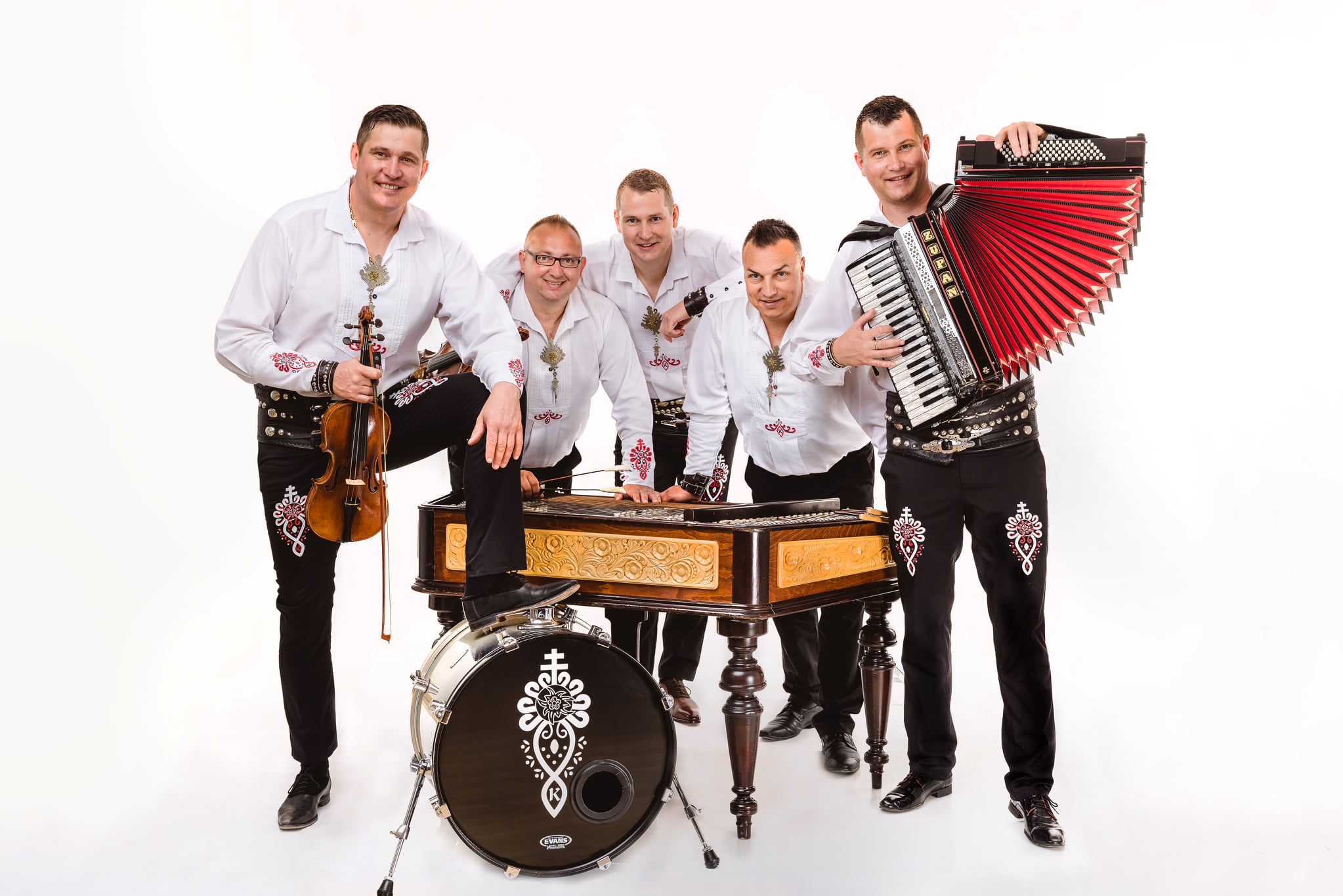
- Official portrait (2021)

Background information
- Origin: Stará Ľubovňa, Slovakia
- Genres: Slovak folk music
- Years active: 1997–present
- Members: Tomáš Kollár; Štefan Kollár; Marek Kollár; Juraj Švedlár; Patrik Červenák; Juliús Michal Hudi; Peter Rončík
- Website: www.kollarovci.sk

Kollárovci (lit. 'Kollár Brothers') is a Slovak folk music band consisting of three Kollár brothers and three other musicians. They were formed in 1997 but debuted in 2006. The group performs Slovak folk music in the Podhale subdialect, which is a mix of Polish and Slovak languages. They switch between singing and playing instruments.

== History ==
In 2013, Kollárovci released Goraľu cy si ne zaľ in both platinum and gold records. They won first place of the Šlágr TV award in 2014. In September 2015, they released a music video for "Daj mi lásku, daj" (lit. 'Give Me Love, Give').

In May 2017, Kollárovci released the song "Anka, Anka" in May 2017 arranged from the folk song "Anka, Anka rád ťa mám" (lit. 'Anka, Anka I like you'). The cast of the video clip were Lívia Soroková, Pavol Borko, Ladislav Socháň, Mária Ovčárová, and firefighters from Liptovský Mikuláš.

Before their nationwide summer tour called Mega Tour Open Air 2019, which took place from 22 June until 18 August, Kollárovci recorded "Chlapci spod Tatier" with fellow Slovak folk music band Kandráčovci. The video was uploaded by TV JOJ on 20 June, two days before the tour began.

== Members ==
- Tomáš Kollár – fiddle
- Štefan Kollár – saxophone, clarinet, accordion, piano
- Marek Kollár – second fiddle
- Juraj Švedlár - bass guitar
- Július Michal Hudi – dulcimer
- Patrik Červenák – drums
- Peter Rončík – guitar

== Discography ==
=== Albums ===
- Z Kolačkova parobci
- Keď chlapci hrajúe
- Hej tam od Tatera
- Pozdrav zo Slovenska
- Dievčata
- Vianoce s Kollárovcami
- Goraľu cy ic ne žal
- Muj život je muzika
- Neúprosný čas
- Vlasy čierne
- Len Tebe spievam
- Vianočná nalada
- Modlym sa piesnou
