= Slovak folk music =

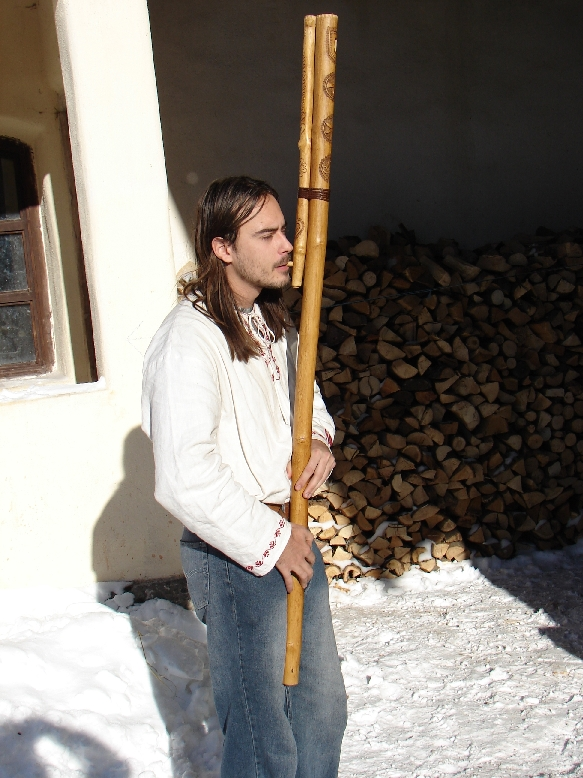
The fujara, a traditional Slovak shepherd's pipe

Slovakia has a large reservoir of folk music. The people of Slovakia tend to designate themselves as the "singing nation". Many musicological studies evidence that Slovak folk music is indigenous and has ancient origins, even in respect to neighbouring ethnic groups. Scientific designations defining Slovak folk music came from the late 19th century onward and set the foundations for Slovakia's modern history of musicological research. Slovakia's musicological research has its roots in Slovakia's national Renaissance from the 19th century, when many leading Slovak personalities were beginning to devote themselves to studying folk traditions.

Composers such as Ján Levoslav Bella began to include Slovak folk music in their compositions, and Slovak music was collected and used by composers such as Béla Bartók, Ján Cikker and Eugen Suchoň.

In November 2005 the fujara (Slovak shepherds' pipe) and its music were named Masterpieces of the Oral and Intangible Heritage of Humanity by UNESCO.

== See also ==
- Music of Slovakia
- Slovak popular music
- The 100 Greatest Slovak Albums of All Time

== Samples ==
- Download recording "Ej lúčka, lúčka široká" Slovak song from the Library of Congress' Florida Folklife from the WPA Collections; performed by Lillian Jakubcin and Emily Mertán on July 31, 1939, in Slavia, Florida
- Muzička - a band playing authentic Slovak folk music.
