= Marianne Lake =

British-American banking executive (born 1969)

- Born: c. 1969 (age 56–57); Cumberland, Maryland, U.S
- Education: University of Reading (BS)
- Occupations: CEO of Consumer & Community Banking, JPMorgan Chase (2019-present); CFO, JPMorgan Chase (2012-2019)

Marianne Lake (born 1969) is a senior British-American banker.

== Early life and education ==
Lake was born to an American mother and English father, and has dual nationality.

Lake has said that she aimed high - encouraged by her mother - from an early age.

She did her bachelor's degree in physics from the University of Reading in United Kingdom.

== Career ==
Lake trained as a Chartered Accountant from Institute of Chartered Accountants in England and Wales at PwC and worked for the firm in London and Sydney.

She joined JPMorgan Chase in 1999. She initially worked in London, moving to New York in 2004, and in various roles in the finance functions within the bank. Lake was chief financial officer from 2013 to 2019. She was chief executive officer of consumer lending from 2019 to 2021. In 2021 Lake and Jennifer Piepszak were named heads of the consumer and community bank. In 2024 she became sole CEO of this business. In January 2024, following a reshuffle at JP Morgan Chase, Lake was tipped in the media as a likely successor to Jamie Dimon as CEO of the global firm. Lake is a member of the JPMorgan Chase Operating Committee. In June 2025 after it was announced Sanoke Viswanathan would be departing Lake took over his responsibility overseeing its overseas consumer banking arm and strategic growth office.

Lake emphasized JPMorgan Chase's role as a technological innovator. Lake co-founded the Women on the Move initiative within JPMorgan Chase.

On 25 June 2026, JPMorgan announced that Lake would retire, as part of a major reshuffling of top management under CEO Jamie Dimon and "the latest twist to the [Dimon] succession saga."

== Recognition ==
She was ranked 23rd on Fortune's list of Most Powerful Women in 2023. In 2024, American Banker recognized Lake as the No. 2 Most Powerful Woman in Banking.

== Personal life ==
At age 41, Lake decided to have her three children through a surrogate even though she didn't have a partner.
