= Zóna A =

Slovak punk rock band

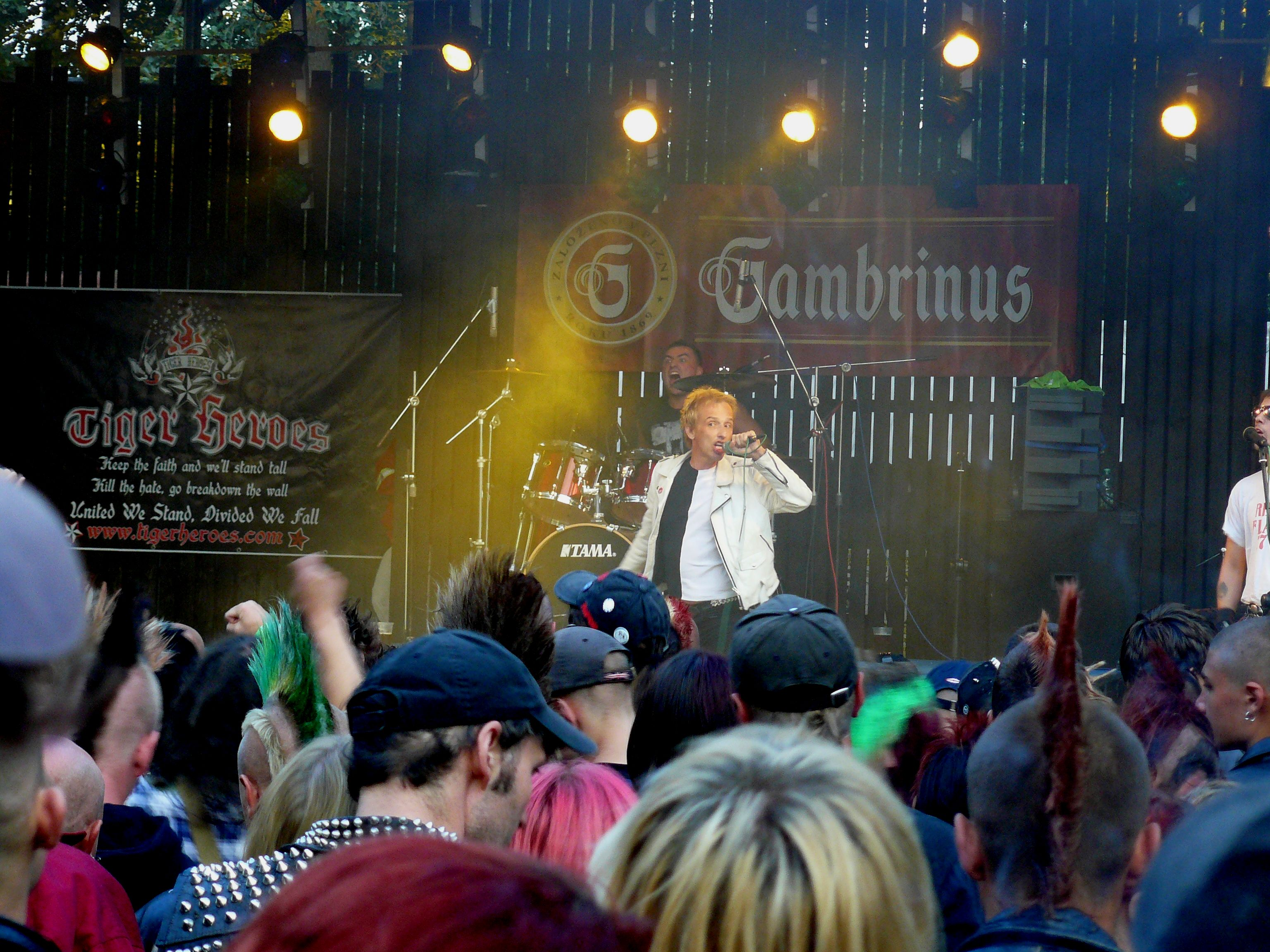
Zóna A at Antifest 2007

Zóna A is a Slovak punk rock band formed in 1984 in Bratislava. The lead vocalist Peter "Koňýk" Schredl is the only co-founder who is still in the band.

== History ==
The band was formed in 1984 by the lead vocalist Peter "Koňýk" Schredl and the guitarist "Leďo", former members of Paradox (a punk band established in 1980), drummer "Ozi", guitarist "Sveťo" (former members of Ex Tip, another punk band established in 1980) and with the bassist Braňo Alex.

Possibilities to play concerts inside and especially outside Czechoslovakia were very limited during the communist regime. Concerts were organized secretly or under a different name, because they were cancelled by the secret police Czechoslovak State Security.

In 1985 the first TV film about the band was made, but it was never broadcast because communist TV leaders labelled it as "unsuitable for socialist youth." In 1986, the secret police seized the band's passports to prohibit them from performing at the Polish music festival Jarocin. At the beginning of 1988, Sveťo left the band to reform Ex Tip. Since 1988, because of perestroika, the situation started to improve. The band started to perform at first official concerts and was interviewed by the media. Also, another TV film was made, but it was broadcast only after the Velvet Revolution in autumn 1989. To celebrate the end of the communist regime, the band performed at two large concerts, one in Bratislava (Vianoce bez násilia) and the other in Prague (Koncert pro všechny slušný lidi) at the end of 1989.

In January 1990, Braňo Alex and Ozi left to establish a new music band Slobodná Európa, together with Sveťo. They were temporarily replaced by a bassist Miki Mikuška and drummer Tibor Čech. In the second half of 1990, the band played first concerts in Western Europe: Italy, Switzerland and Austria. In 1991, a bassist Miro "Lump" Lederleitner and drummer Miroslav "Mikko" Šimboch completed the line-up. Zóna A signed with the EMI record company in 1996. Leďo was replaced by another guitarist "Revo" in 2002.

The band has internationally performed in France, United Kingdom, Italy, Switzerland, Slovenia, Germany, Austria, Poland, and Hungary.

== Members ==
=== Current members ===
- Peter "Koňýk" Schredl - vocals (1984 – present)
- Martin "Revo" Revický - guitar (2002 – present)
- Martin Polák – guitar (2018 – present)
- Rudolf "Vajco" Zelenay – drums (2016 – present)

=== Past members ===
- Miro "Lump Čupe" Lederleitner - bass (1991 – 2016)
- Tomáš "Tuleň" Vojtek - drums (2008 – 2016)
- Miro "Mikko" Šimboch – drums (1991 – 2008)
- Jaro "Leďo" Lederleitner – guitar (1984 – 2002)
- Tibor Čech – drums (1990 – 1991)
- Miki Mikuška – bass (1990 – 1991)
- Braňo Alex – bass (1984 – 1990)
- Ľudovít "Elvis" Gálka – accordion (1988 – 1990)
- Sveťo Korbeľ – guitar (1984 – 1988)

== Discography ==
- Potopa (1990) - first album, re-released in 2000
- Nie je to tak zlé (1993)
- Útok na špicu hitparády (1994) - a compilation that contains old songs from TV films Zóna A and Nezmením sa! about the band
- V životnej forme (1996) - third album
- Nech žijeme (1999) - second compilation, contains old songs from demo tapes
- Nikto nevie jak to dopadne (2000)
- Na predaj (2004)
- Klenoty a odpadky (2007) - rarities from 1991 to 2000
- Všetko Najlepšie ! (2010) - compilation of 27 songs to celebrate 27th anniversary of the band

== External links and references ==
- zonaa.sk - Official website (in Slovak)
- Zóna A discography at Discogs
