= Win Labuda =

German researcher, photographer and entrepreneur

Win Labuda (born Winfried Gerhard Labudda: 26 June 1938, in Danzig) is a German researcher, science photographer and entrepreneur.

== Research ==
Labuda founded the company Clear & Clean GmbH in Lübeck in 1979. From then on his research activities focused on surface cleanliness in relation to the mechanics of wiper-based cleaning procedures. For this purpose, he developed a number of test methods and devices. Labuda is the author and co-author of a number of patents and extensive technical literature, published by the publishing house of the VDI (Association of German Engineers) and by the GIT publishing house, in addition to numerous online publications.

== Art ==
Labuda has produced extensive photographic work since the 1950s and has mounted exhibitions since 1981 in Munich, Paris, Tokyo, Düsseldorf and New York. In 2012 the photobook A Journey to the Beginning of Time was published. It is a photographic cycle in four series that reflects on the history of earth and mankind from an artist's perspective.

From 1982 on, Labuda has also produced drawings, graphic art, reliefs and sculptures. Along with Nadja Labuda, he is the author of a number of online publications on photography, painting and graphic art.

== Literature (excerpt) ==
- "A Passion for Cleanroom Technology" [Reinraumtechnik aus Passion] (PDF). ReinraumTechnik. GIT Verlag. February 2002.
- "Win Labuda – Researcher, Entrepreneur, Artist – A Biography on the Occasion of his 70th Birthday" [Win Labuda – Forscher, Unternehmer, Künstler – ein Lebenslauf am 70. Geburtstag]. ReinraumTechnik. GIT Verlag. March 2008.
- Habermüller, Dr. Katja (March 2009). "Time Requirements and Surface Cleanliness in Wiper-Based Cleaning Procedures" [Zeitbedarf und Oberflächenreinheit bei wischenden Reinigungsprozessen]. ReinraumTechnik. GIT Verlag.
- Schollmeyer, Eckhard (28 August 2010). "Technology, Science and Art – A Tribute to Win Labuda, a laudatory address by Professor Dr. Eckhard Schollmeyer" (PDF).
- Kobel, Stefan (February 21, 2004). "Art for All, or: Collecting is Fun" [Kunst für Alle, oder: Sammeln macht Spaß]. Die Welt.
- Lodevicus Hermans, Win Labuda: "Triboelectric Charges in the Semiconductor Production Environment". [Elektrische Oberflächen-Ladungen im Fertigungs-Umfeld der Halbleiter-Industrie]. ReinraumTechnik 1,2,3/2005, GIT Verlag
- Win Labuda: "Cleanroom Consumables - Aspects, Simulation, Arguments". Reinraum-Verbrauchsmaterial - Aspekte, Simulation, Argumente. ReinraumTechnik 1/2017, Special Edition, Wiley-VCH Verlag, Weinhein
- Win Labuda: "On the History of Clean Working". [Zur Geschichte des Reinen Arbeitens]. ReinraumTechnik 3/2018, Wiley-VCH Verlag, Weinheim
- about Labuda: "Portrait of a Visionary - A Brief Biography of Win Labuda" Portrait eines Visionärs - das Leben des Win Labuda. Biography and laudations, ReinraumTechnik 4/2018, Wiley-VCH Verlag, Weinheim
