= Longital =

Slovak rock band

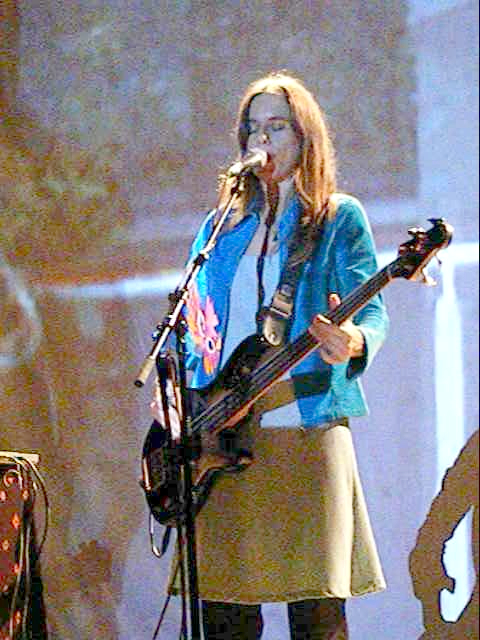
Shina performing, October 2008.

Longital (until 2006 known as Dlhé diely) is a Slovak music group. They take their name from the old name for the Bratislava suburb, Dlhé diely, in which they live.

== Members ==
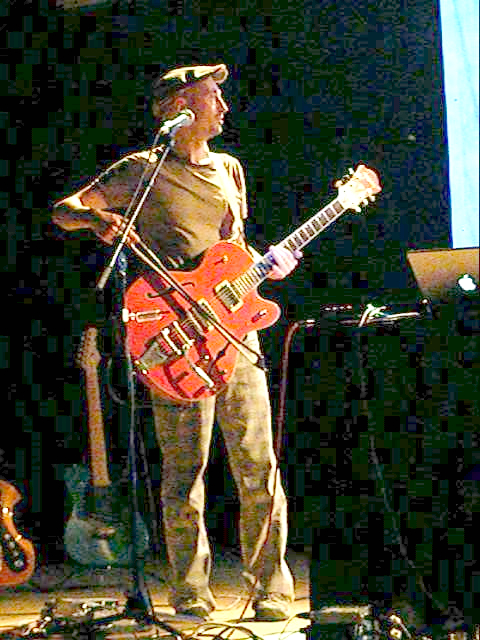
Daniel Salontay playing bowed guitar, October 2008.

The group consists of Daniel Salontay and Shina or Šina Lo (real name Jana Lokšenincová). Marián Slávka has also had two spells as a band member.

Salontay studied mathematics and formerly taught computer programming; between 1997 and 1998 he studied guitar at Tri-C College, Cleveland, but left due to dissatisfaction with the school's curriculum . In the group he plays the guitar, often bowed, and sings.

Shina studied engineering and worked as a graphic designer. She plays fretless bass and takes most of the vocal responsibilities.

== History ==
Salontay and Shina became a couple in 1997 in Cleveland. In 2000 they formed the band Dlhé Diely with which they released 5 albums on their own label Slnko Records . The label soon gained respect in the music community and business, and grew steadily to become probably the largest independent label in Slovakia.

The band first came to attention internationally after appearing at The Big Chill (music festival) in 2005 still as Dlhé diely. In 2006 the duo changed their name to Longital, released the album Voyage, and began to tour extensively in Europe. In 2008 the band released the album Gloria. Longital's US debut was in early 2010 at SXSW Austin.

The band has also played at Pohoda festival Slovakia, the International Guitar festival Clonakilty Ireland, Mediawave Hungary, United Islands of Prague, Colours of Ostrava, Gena Festival Switzerland, and a number of festivals in France: Europavox Vichy, Mimi Marseille, Les Nuits Europeennes Strasbourg, Le printemps de Bourges, Les Oreilles en Pointe Unieux, Electro choc Bourgon, Gare aux Oreilles Coustellet, and Musiques Innovatrices St. Etienne.

In 2007, Longital toured with The Frames. The duo also shared the stage with Glen Hansard and Marketa Irglova, Emiliana Torrini, Moloko, The Ruby Suns, Tujiko Noriko, Lali Puna, Black, Claire Di Terzi, Aaron, Xploding plastix, Medeski-Martin-Wood, Ralph Myerz, The Levelers, Susanne and the Magic Orchestra and Nina Hynes.

== Style ==
The group's website describes their songs as, "drifted by ambient sounds, organic electronics, eastern European beats and a touch of psychedelia" , while on their Myspace site they categorise themselves as, "Alternative/electronica".

Longital invite comparisons to Nordic brethren Sigur Rós, playing bowed guitars and singing in a language understood by few outside of their homeland. Before forming Longital, Salontay was schooled jazz musician steeped in the traditional music of Iran and India, Shina was a poet and folk singer. The duo create a sound informed by music from far-flung reaches of the globe but still distinguished by its Eastern European provenance, a touch of technology and experimentation.

== Discography ==
- Dlhé diely. September. (Slnko records, 2001)
- Šinadisk. (Slnko records, 2001)
- Dlhé diely. Tu. (Slnko records, 2002),
- Šina. In Virgo. (Slnko records, 2003)
- Dlhé diely. Sveta diely (Slnko records, 2004)
- Longital. Výprava / Voyage. (Slnko records, 2006)
- Longital. Gloria. (Slnko records, 2008)
- Longital. Long Live (live album) (Slnko records, 2010)
- Longital. Teraz / Now (Slnko records, 2010)
- Longital. A to je všetko? (Slnko records, 2015)
- Longital. Longital Suita (Live recording with string quartet) (Slnko records, 2016)
- Longital. Divoko (Slnko records, 2016)
- Longital. Mauna (Slnko records, 2019)
- Longital. Dočista (Slnko records, 2022)
