= Majster Kat =

Slovak thrash metal band

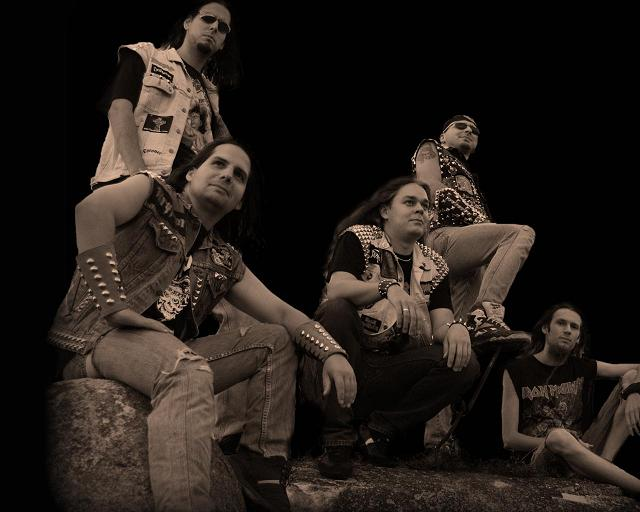
- Majster kat 2007

Background information
- Origin: Bratislava, Slovakia
- Genres: Thrash metal
- Years active: 2001–present
- Label: Panda Music
- Members: Slymák; Los; Lukáš; Tapyr; Bubonix
- Website: www.majsterkat.sk

Majster Kat is a thrash metal band based out of Bratislava, Slovakia. Majster Kat’s music is highly technical, characterised by layered melodies and constant shifts in atmosphere.

== Biography ==
Majster Kat was founded by Slymak (vocals) and Gabo (guitar) in 2001. In 2002, the original lineup was completed with Sigi (drums) and Los (lead guitar).

In this line-up Majster Kat had a lot of concerts including the summer metal festivals in Slovakia and recorded its first demo record. In August 2004, after 2 years of seeking for a bass guitar player, Tapyr joined the band.

The year 2005 is marked with a lot of member changing the band. Since 2006 the band has performed in formation Slymak (vocals), Los ( lead guitar), Lukas (guitar), Tapyr (bass) and Bubonix (drums).

In this lineup the first album called Svätá zvrhlosť (in translation it means "Depravity of The Pious") was released in October 2007 under the Czech label Panda Music.

== Current members ==
- Slymák – vocals
- Los – lead guitar and backing vocals
- Lukáš – guitar
- Tapyr – bass and backing vocals
- Bubonix – drums

== Discography ==
=== Official releases ===
- Svätá zvrhlosť 2007 - (CD)
- Memento... 2014 - (CD)

=== Demo recording and live releases ===
- 2003 - Live in Dreváreň
- 2004 - Demo
- Naživo v Bratislave 2007 - (DVD)
