= Wayd =

Slovak progressive death metal band

- Origin: Prešov, Slovakia
- Genres: Progressive death metal, technical death metal, jazz fusion
- Years active: 1994–present
- Members: Drahoš Juřík; Milan Savko; Richard Majer; Peter Jakubík
- Website: Bandcamp

Wayd is a Slovak progressive death metal band with jazz influence from Prešov, Slovakia.

== Biography ==
Founded in 1994, death metal band WAYD was formed by the merger of the metal bands MARION and DYSENTERY. Although these were conventional metal bands known only in the regional underground scene, WAYD resolved to break the borders between their styles, as well as create more experimental and musically richer compositions. This combination of different atmospheres and feelings in their work has been fundamental from the beginning, while continuing an emphasis on the energetic characteristic of their music. As a band, WAYD aims to produce music and words in which everyone can find something of interest for themselves.

WAYD was set up by Milan Savko (vocals and guitars), Braňo Kóša (drums), Richard Majer (guitars) and Drahoš Juřík (bass guitar and vocals). In 2022, Braňo left the band and was replaced by drummer Peter Jakubík.

In 1995, the demo “Shape of Your Mind” consisting of ten early songs was recorded in the AD Micro Studio, Prešov.

Two years later, in 1997, new material forming the album “The Ultimate Passion” was recorded in the Exponent Studio and released by Metal Age Production. This album featured ten new songs, with some of them enriched by keyboards and female vocals. The lyrics explore the human soul and muse on the darker side of life, as well as examining more down-to-earth matters. They represent a reaction to the events of everyday life and share personal reflections on the meaning and value of reality.

In 2001, a second album, “Barriers”, was released by Metal Age Production. It contains eleven tracks of aggressive and technical death metal and was recorded in Perina Studio, Prešov. This album is highly melodic and is enhanced by saxophone parts. The music on this album exhibits real energy and consistent power. The lyrics deal with various themes, including the subconscious, love and hate, joy and sadness, freedom and passion.

WAYD's third album, “Decadance”, released in 2003 contains twelve tracks, including two instrumentals. It was recorded in Perina Studio, Prešov, during the summer of 2002. Some of the compositions on this album have been enriched by saxophone and trumpets, with guitar samples also being used to emphasise atmosphere. The material is full of energy and avant-garde death metal music with doubled vocals. The lyrics examine feelings of joy, hate, sadness, relationships, self-realisation, and the darker side of life.

2007 saw the release of WAYD's fourth album, “Ghostwalk”, by Hrom Records. It contains nine tracks of atypical technical death metal and was recorded in Studio Klakson, Malý Šariš. This album includes a video from the recording and the official video for the song “Rivers of the Night”.

After the release of this fourth album, WAYD played numerous concerts in its support. The last live performance of this era was played in May 2009 as a celebration of the band's fifteenth anniversary. After this, the band went into ‘hibernation’ as three of the members moved abroad and playing together was not possible. WAYD returned to the performance scene eight years later, in October 2017.

WAYD's new album, “Reinvent”, was self-released on November 1, 2025. The album contains 11 new songs, with the saxophone and trumpet being utilized in some. The lyrics attempts to capture and reflect both current social events and various states of mind.

Over its thirty-year existence, WAYD have played many gigs in Slovakia, Czechia, Poland, and Germany.

== Current members ==
- Drahoš Juřík – bass, vocals (1994-present)
- Milan Savko – guitar, vocals (1994-present)
- Richard Majer – guitar (1994-present)
- Peter Jakubík – drums (2022-present)

== Discography ==
=== Official releases ===
- The Ultimate Passion (1997)
- Barriers (2001)
- Decadance (2003)
- Ghostwalk (2007)
- Reinvent (2025)

=== Demo recording ===
- Shape of Your Mind 1995
