= The Bridgeheads =

Slovak rock band

- Origin: Bardejov, Slovakia
- Genres: Alternative, art rock, experimental, indie rock, Expressionism
- Years active: 2007–2010
- Members: Tomáš dAsK (vocals, guitar, piano, songwriting); Jozef Lemee (guitar, piano); Michal Wisp (drums)
- Website: Official website

The Bridgeheads was a London-based alternative band, formed in 2007. The band originated from Slovakia, and described themselves as performing "expressionism". The band decided to stop after the singer, Tomas dAsK, died on 27 September 2010. The line up consisted of Tomas (vocals, guitar, piano, songwriting), Jozef Lemee (guitar, piano) and Michal Wisp (drums). The line-up did not include a bass guitar - this was replaced by dAsK’s specific octave guitar played without the B-string.

== Career ==
=== Beginning and EP Things (2006–2010) ===
After moving to London in 2006, the members were looking for the right name for the band. Shortly after the first recording sessions, the final line-up change occurred, and band ended up without a bass player, which would later become one of their most significant marks. In 2007, The Bridgeheads were formed, with a definitive formation consisting of Tomáš dAsK, Jozef Lemee and Michal Wisp. In the same year, the band released the EP Things about the dark side of human existence. "From the beginning this city has had a deep effect on the music I write", summed up dAsK and the three songs "Things", "Animals" and "Expression" amply demonstrated the breadth of his songwriting skills. All the consequent tours and recordings were done as a tree piece with dAsK developing a specific octave guitar playing without A-string along the way. In 2007 and 2008, The Bridgeheads played several UK and European shows, however, since August 2008, the band focused only on recording of their forthcoming debut LP and completely abandoned touring until 2010.

=== Foreigners (2010–present) ===
The Bridgeheads spent approximately three years making their first LP, Foreigners, which was recorded at several different places including The Hours Studios and Gravity Shack Studios in London, and a studio at Middlesex University in London.

In an interviews at the beginning of 2008, dAsK said, "We want to make an album we would like to listen to ourselves. It will include sadness, happiness, rebellion, all emotions which I have in myself at the moment… I’m sure it’ll be the strongest record we've made so far. We have strong melodies, head full of ideas and we don’t want to underestimate the intelligence of ours listeners."

A few weeks before releasing the LP, dAsK wrote on the band's scrapbook, "…it was very exhausting to get the things right, sonically. It was like painting a picture where every stroke of paint brush has its place, and if you put it differently it will change the whole meaning. The whole record, for me, is what Guernica is for Picasso or Sunflowers for Van Gogh…"

The album was released as a free digital download from the band’s official website on 22 May 2010, and fans, in return, were asked to recommend the record to others in case they like it. The download was accompanied by a message from dAsK saying: "…the record we’ve been working on for the last 3 years is now finished and its name is Foreigners. It may require more listens to uncover all its details and value, and also to get into its untraditional sound without a bass guitar. We wish it would be listened to as a whole thing…"

Simultaneously, in the spirit of the band's artistic roots, a one-off original handmade release was announced to be going on auction on 11 November 2010 containing a twelfth song no one else would be able to hear apart from the actual owner; the original framed oil painting, drawings and handwritten lyrics made by singer dAsK for the album cover; and signature from all three band members. dAsK also decided to make eleven videos entirely on his own to give each song on the album an equal value. All the videos are said to be gradually published on The Bridgeheads official website.

The Bridgeheads were nominated in Radiohead Awards of Radio FM station as the best newcomer of 2010. Foreigners was physically released in 2011.

== Discography ==
=== Albums ===
- 2005: Citizen Bridge (as The Bridge)
- 2010: Foreigners

=== EPs ===
- 2007: Things
