= Kalijuge =

Slovak progressive metal band

Kalijuge!
- Kalijuge! 2008. From left to right. Dušan Labuda, Jano Svoboda, Martin Kralik, Lukaš Rusnak, Rafael Márquez

Background information
- Origin: Žilina, Slovakia
- Genres: Progressive metal, Progressive rock
- Years active: 1995–present
- Label: unsigned
- Members: Jano "Freedom" Svoboda; Dušan Labuda; Lukaš Rusnak; Martin Kralik; Rafael Márquez
- Past members: Andrej Pekar; Roman Oresan; Truba; Palo Chodelka; Lubos Tomascik; Barbora Lipkova; Jano Huljak
- Website: Kalijuge MySpace Kalijuge website

Kalijuge! is a Slovak progressive metal band formed in 1995 in Žilina, Slovakia. Though the lineup has changed frequently, two of the founding members of the band, Jano Svoboda and Dušan Labuda have remained in the formation.

The music of Kalijuge is quite difficult to classify. Working inside the bounds of the progressive metal music, Kalijuge takes motives and ideas that look similar to older bands like Kansas, Yes and Pink Floyd and adds from other styles like funk or even thrash sounds.

== History ==
=== First Formation (1995) ===
The origin of the name of the band comes from Kali Yuga which is the fourth and last age of the Hindu mythology. It is supposed to mean "modern times" and we are in this age.

=== Old formation and new message (2002) ===
After a number of changes in the band, in 2002 it released its first EP called "New Message", recorded with the formation known as the "old formation" or "classical formation": Jano "Freedom" Svoboda, Dusan Labuda, Palo Chodelka, Lubos Tomascik, Jano Huljak. Truba, the former guitarist made the back vocals for the album. After performing all around Slovakia, the band gained a considerable national success, specially inside the musical rock underground where a formation like this was completely unknown in the country.

The EP had three songs and became quite popular among the musicians related to the progressive or symphonic metal.

During the next years, the band would continue giving concerts regularly with that classical formation.

=== Band break up and renewal (2004-2007) ===
Some of the musicians, for different reasons, left the band until the point that only 2 members from the original formation were remaining, Jano Svoboda and Dusan Labuda. Truba was already out of the band at the release of New Message. Palo Chodelka left the band too and continued working on his own solo project, Liquid Boogie Roll and some others projects. After that, the keyboard player Lubos Tomascik also left to start his personal project, which would be known later as the band Amphibios, and electronic-drum'n'bass band. A time after that Jano Huljak, the drummer would leave the band to finally join with the already formed band Amphibios.

Some time after that differences between Svoboda and Labuda would end with the end of that era for Kalijuge!. Meanwhile, the singer of the band had been working with bands like Arzen and HT.

Labuda started to play in another formation with Lukaš Rusnak and, after fixing his differences with Freedom, would restart in the band bringing Rusnak with him.

After the rejoining of the band and the final farewell of Huljak, a new drummer, Martin Kralik, joined them.

From Martin contacts they found a very skilled keyboardist, classical music piano player, Barbora Lipkova. She had finished in the top positions in some European contests of piano performance and would record some new themes with them that would never be totally finished. Very skilled technically and musically, the new keyboardist did not put the band among her top priorities which included some other formations. The band couldn't perform any concerts during 2007 because Lipkova was not in the country at that time, due to working reasons.

=== Last renewal and return (2008) ===
Around the first days of March 2008, Svoboda started talking with a new keyboard player after realizing that Lipkova would not have time enough to play with them. This new keyboard player was Rafael Márquez, a Spaniard who had been living in Slovakia for more than 2 years and had played in other formations. Marquez accepted to try playing with them and after this encounter started to work with the band about the end of April 2008.

In the month of June 2008, after 2 months of training together with the full new formation, Kalijuge! returned to the scene with a concert in Žilina, the band's hometown.

The band continued working during the summer on 2008 on the release of the album and some concerts. After working on the promo material, the full release was expected to come out at the beginning of 2009. Their first video clip had its final release at the beginning of October 2008.

During 2009, the band had its best year with many successful concerts all around Slovakia and abroad. New songs entered the repertoire of the band and it started 2010 with a good list of concerts reserved for the year.
