= Morna (band) =

Slovak progressive death metal band

- Official photo of a band, 2015. From left to right: Michal Vlkovic, Jakub Filip, Tomas Cvecka and Robert Ruman.

Background information
- Origin: Nova Dubnica, Slovakia
- Genres: Progressive death metal, melodic death metal
- Years active: 2010–present
- Members: Michal Vlkovic; Robert Ruman; Tomas Cvecka; Jakub Filip
- Website: morna.sk

Morna is a Slovak progressive death metal band founded in 2010 by Michal Vlkovic, Jakub Filip and Robert Ruman. In summer of 2011, Tomas Cvecka joined Morna as a full-time bass guitarist. Morna is distinctive for their ability to combine many stylistic elements and influences such as melodiousness, progressivity, use of acoustic guitar parts and heavy riffs, death growls and clean vocals and classical hard rock, progressive rock and blues influences.

In May 2013 the band released their debut studio album, A Tale of Woe. In February 2014, it was nominated in the category of Hard & Heavy for Record of the year of 2013 by Radio Head Awards.

In May 2015 the band announced they were gearing up to record their second full-length studio album. Recording started in July 2015 and continued to the end of November at the same year. In the same month, on 13 November, Morna announced the new album would be called Nuisance. An announcement of the track listing soon followed. Nuisance was nominated by Radio Head Awards 2015 for the Record of the Year. It won the award for the album in the category Hard & Heavy.

== Discography ==
- A Tale of Woe (2013)
- Nuisance (2015)

== Awards and nominations ==
Radio Head Awards

Year	Nominee / work	Award	Result
2014	A Tale of Woe	Best Hard & Heavy Record	Nominated
2016	Nuisance	Best Hard & Heavy Record	Won
