= Jeanne R. Faatz =

American politician

Jeanne Ryan Faatz (born July 30, 1941) is a former teacher and state legislator in Colorado. A Republican she served in the Colorado House of Representatives from 1979–1998. She also served as a Denver City Councilman from 2003-2015.

She was born in Cumberland, Maryland. She received a B.S. degree in English Education from the University of Illinois in 1962 and an MA in Communication from the University of Colorado at Denver in 1985. She was a Gates Fellow at Harvard University Program for Senior Executives in State and Local Government. She taught English and speech in public schools in Urbana, Illinois from 1963–1966 and at Cherry Creek Public Schools in Englewood from 1966-1967. Faatz taught at Metro State University and Regis University from 1985-1998. She was secretary to the majority leader in the Colorado Senate from 1976-1978 and then served as a Colorado State Representative in the Colorado House of Representatives for District 1 from 1979-1998. She was Assistant Majority Leader in the Colorado House of Representatives from 1991–1998.

She's a Republican. She supported Colorado's school choice legislation.
