= Ska2tonics =

Slovak band

- Origin: Bratislava, Slovakia
- Genres: Ska punk, reggae
- Labels: EMI
- Members: Vlado Konček, Ramon Esteves; Rasťo Peteraj, Juraj Lehuta; Katka Sapáková, Tomáš Giba; Rado Vraník, Braňo Zervan; Imrich Kamenár
- Past members: Maťo Patka, Tomáš Heretik, Martin Macek, Roman Kaldrovitsch
- Website: www.ska2tonics.sk

Ska2tonics is a Slovak co-ed band based in Bratislava.

== History ==
Originally formed as a punk group in 1999, the band decided to do ska. After some demo records, Ska2tonics released their debut album titled Skatastrofa.

== Members ==
- Vlado Konček – guitar, lead vocals
- Ramon Esteves – bass guitar, vocals
- Rasťo Peteraj – guitar
- Juraj Lehuta – drums
- Katka Sapáková Smyčková – tenor saxophone
- Rado Vraník – alt saxophone
- Braňo Zervan – alt saxophone
- Imrich Kamenár – trombone

=== Former members ===
- Tomáš Giba – trumpet
- Maťo Patka – drums
- Tomáš Heretik – guitar
- Martin Macek – bass guitar
- Roman Kaldrovitsch – bass guitar
- Viktor Cotiofan – bass guitar

== Discography ==
- 2003: Demo
- 2004: EP 2004
- 2005: Demo 2005
- 2006: Demo 2006
- 2007: Skatastrofa (EMI)
- 2009: Toto ti zachutí (EMI)
- 2012: Ska2tonics
