= Bruno Benetton Free Band =

Slovak electro-rock group

- Origin: Bratislava, Slovakia
- Genres: Rock, alternative rock, new wave
- Years active: 2008–present
- Members: Tomáš Palonder; Michal Neffe; Martin Krížik; Marek Hradský; Juraj Varga; Michal Danielis; Michal Uličný
- Website: www.brunobenetton.sk

Bruno Benetton Free Band is a Slovak electro-rock group from Bratislava, Slovakia. The members are:

- Tomáš Palonder — lead vocals
- Michal Neffe — guitar, backing vocals
- Martin Krížik — piano, synthesizer, backing vocals
- Juraj Varga – bass guitar, backing vocals
- Michal Danielis — keyboards, programming
- Michal Uličný — drums
- Marek Hradský — guitar

== Biography ==
In 2006, Martin Krížik met Michal Neffe while both were browsing in a local music store. They hit it off immediately and decided to see if they could do something unique with their common musical interests. Within two years they had found a couple of other musicians who were happy to take part in their musical experiments and in 2009 with the final addition of Tomáš Palonder they became the Bruno Benetton Free Band. In November 2010 they released their debut album The Phenomenons of Pop.

Since then, the Bruno Benetton Free Band has played such venues as the NuSpirit Club, Spring Urban Market, Slovak Radio, and Voices Live. Their songs "You're my mate" and "For sure" have been featured on Rádio FM and Musiq 1 TV. They won a national music contest organized by T-Mobile. Bruno Benetton Free Band has collaborated with musicians from both Europe and the United States of America. One of these efforts can be viewed in the music video "Stars are memory" recorded in Austin, Texas, by director Mark Winslett, with singer Nathan Lively. Bruno Benetton Free Band has also co-written songs, including "Stars are memory", with award-winning poet Richard Lance Williams from Austin, Texas. In 2012 two songs from the album The Phenomenons of Pop were nominated for Radio Head Awards 2010 by Rádio FM.

== Discography ==
- The Phenomenons of Pop (2010)

== Awards and nominations ==
Year	Award	Category	Result
2010	Radio Head Awards	Live band of the Year	Nominated
