= Rozpor =

Slovak punk rock band

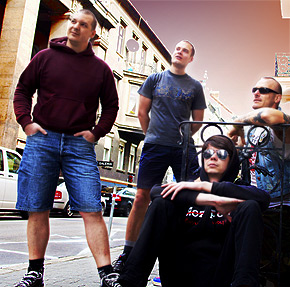
- Rozpor in 2014. From left to right: Rumun, Jazzy, Zorro, and Datra.

Background information
- Origin: Bratislava, Slovakia
- Genres: Punk rock; Oi!
- Years active: 1999–present
- Label: Žiadna značka
- Members: Fabko; Zorro; Datra; Peklo
- Past members: Walter; Lupes; Filip; Rumun; Jazzy; Žlna; Žlna; Harley; Bedla
- Website: www.rozpor.sk

Rozpor is a Slovak punk band from Bratislava, Slovakia, performing Oi! and hardcore punk. They are known for their strict anti-fascist stance.

== History ==
Rozpor was founded in 1999. In 2000, they self-published their debut album/demo, Nezabudneme! (lit. 'We Will Not Forget!'). The band's 2002 album, Ilegálna spravodlivosť (lit. 'Illegal Justice'), brought them not only participation in punk compilations and intensive touring around West Slavic countries, but also a creative decade of additional releases under "Žiadna značka – No label", by which the band highlights the DIY ethic. Rozpor has gained notoriety for its passionate and original stage show, the frequent brawls accompanying its performances, many of its fans' rowdy nature, for playing shows in poverty-stricken Roma regions, and for their opposition to Slovak far right politician Marian Kotleba. The band drew minor controversy in 2008 following an appearance on Czech Television, when the Czech Republic's Council for Radio and Television Broadcasting investigated a complaint about the display of an Antifa flag and the lead singer's "Good Night White Pride" T-shirt during the broadcast.

== Members ==
=== Current members ===
- Fabko – lead vocals (2015–present), drums (2011)
- Zorro – drums (2013–present)
- Datra – lead guitar, vocals (1999–present)
- Bedla – bass, vocals (2015–present)

=== Past members ===
- Filip – drums, vocals (1999–2013)
- Walter – lead vocals (1999–2001)
- Lupes – bass, vocals (1999–2011)
- Jazzy – bass, vocals (2011–2015)
- Rumun – lead vocals (2001–2015, additional appearances in later videos and recordings)
- Žlna – drums (2011, 2018)
- Harley – drums (2011, 2016)

== Discography ==
- 2000 - Nezabudneme! MC+CD (Žiadna značka – No label)
- 2002 - Ilegálna spravodlivosť CD (Žiadna značka – No label)
- 2004 - Organizovaný punk CD (Žiadna značka – No label)
- 2009 - Rozpor... su uchilny zido bolsevycky fetaci!!! CD (Žiadna značka – No label)
- 2011 - V lete oi, v zime crust... LP (Žiadna značka – No label)
- 2014 - Soundtrack out of the Box LP split (Žiadna značka – No label)
- 2016 - Radikálna ľudskosť 10" LP picture disc (Žiadna značka – No label)
- 2022 - Hrubá sila LP (Žiadna značka – No label)

=== Collaborations ===
- 2001 - Czech and Slovak Street Kids Vol. 1 CD (Rabiát Records)
- 2003 - Czech and Slovak Street Kids Vol. 2 CD (Rabiát Records)
- 2005 - Drivin' 2 Hell CD (Kids and Heroes Records)
- 2006 - Punkrock made in Slovakia vol. 5 CD (Musica, s.r.o.)
- 2008 - Garaż nr. 26 Promo CD (Jimmy Jazz Records)
- 2010 - A Tribute to The Oppressed CD (SHR Records)
- 2011 - Critical Mass riddim

=== Videos ===
- 2006 - "Fanatik"
- 2008 - "Môj pohreb (Parte)"
- 2011 - "Nestala sa z nás už pi*ovina?"
- 2012 - "Zostarnúť mladý"
- 2013 - "Potrebujeme makať na sebe"
- 2015 - "Vlk"
