= April Weeps =

Slovak post-metal band

- Origin: Dunajská Streda, Slovakia
- Genres: Post-metal, gothic metal, melodic death metal, groove metal
- Years active: 2004–2010 (as April Weeds); 2010–present (as April Weeps)
- Members: Miloš "Stronghold" Dupal (keyboards); Matúš Novanský (guitars); Norbert "N" Frick (growl/scream); Marta Somogyi (vocals/scream); Peter "Pítrs" Vavra (drums); Mário Turis (guitars); Thomas Csibri (guitars)
- Past members: Michal Borbély (bass); Tomáš Opavský (bass); Pál Horváth (guitar); Roland Danics (drums); Zoltán "Dexter" Cséfalvay (guitars)
- Website: aprilweeps.com

April Weeps is a Slovak post-metal band, based in Dunajská Streda. They are known for their heavy riffs, atmospheric melodies, and intense and energetic performances. The band released its first album titled Outer Calm, Pain Within in 2013 and played with such bands as Epica, Novembre, Draconian, In Mourning, Saturnus and Tristania since then.

== April Weeds era ==
The band originally formed in 2004 under the name April Weeds. In 2007, they released an unofficial, home recorded demo album titled Songs from the Old House. After playing a few gigs, the constant line-up changes caused the band to go dormant. In 2010, the band went through a reboot and because of their name's similarity with marijuana, changed their name to April Weeps.

== Outer Calm, Pain Within ==
From the original line up, only 2 band members remained: Miloš Dupal (keyboards) and Zoltán Cséfalvay (rhythm guitar). The new members who joined the band were Roland Danics (drums), Pál Horváth (guitar), Norbert Frick (growl, screams) and Michal Borbély (bass). Later in 2012, Marta Somogyi (vocals) joined the band. In 2013, the band released their debut album titled Outer Calm, Pain Within, featuring 11 tracks. The public reception was mixed at first, considered as frantic in places, but later the reviews were more accepting. The same year, they qualified to attend the Wacken Metal Battle Semi Finals for Slovakia, but were not selected to continue to the finals.

In 2014, the band made it into Spark magazine's "Spark Fresh Blood" contest finals.

In 2015, the band started its first tour through Czech Republic, Slovakia and Poland.

== Tribute recordings ==
In 2016, the band was asked to participate on a Paradise Lost tribute album, The Plague Inside by the label Fono Records, Ltd (Russia) and recorded the song "Shine". In December of the same year, the band recorded the song "She Is the Dark" for the My Dying Bride tribute album titled Long Stay in the Darkness.

== Comma ==
In February 2018, the band announced they were to release the song "Palingenesis", from their second album named Comma.

== Cataclastic ==
The band released the album named Catalclastic on 4 June 2022, including 8 tracks with 45 minutes and 19 seconds runtime.

== Discography ==
- Outer Calm, Pain Within (2013)
- Comma (2018)
- Cataclastic (2022)
