= Iné Kafe =

Slovak punk rock band

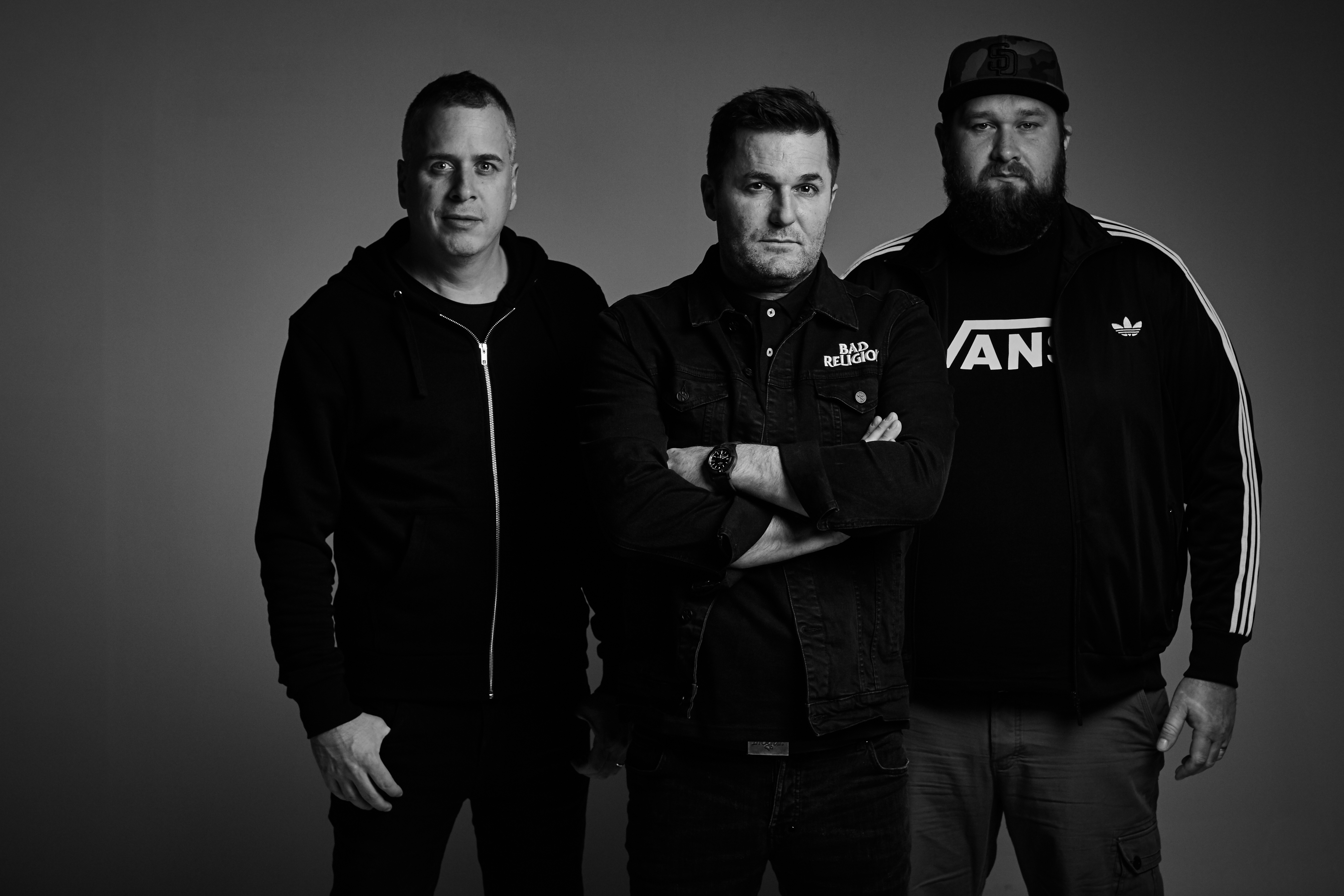
- From right to left: Jozef Praženec, Vratko Rohoň, Vlado Bis

Background information
- Also known as: Inekafe
- Origin: Bratislava, Slovakia
- Genres: punk rock, pop rock, pop punk
- Years active: 1995-2006, 2010-present
- Labels: Forza music, Universal Music, Shotgun Records
- Members: Vratko Rohoň; Jozef "Dodo" Praženec; Vlado Bis
- Past members: Roman "Hulo" Hulín; Mário "Wayo" Praženec; Tibor Prinkler; Majo Chromý; Noro Komada; Marek "Cibi" Cibula; Dano Mathia; Ján Rozbora; Peter "Forus" Fóra
- Website: www.inekafe.sk

Iné kafe is a Slovak punk rock boyband established in 1995 in Bratislava. Singer-songwriter, guitarist, and songwriter Vratko Rohoň is the frontman of the band. Their 2000 album Je Tu Niekto? received Platinum status for 20,000 albums sold in Slovakia. They signed a contract with the Universal Music Group/PolyGram in 1999.

== Members ==
Current members

- Vratko Rohoň - guitar (1995–present), lead vocals (1999–present)
- Jozef "Dodo" Praženec - drums (1995–2000, 2005 (S&V Tour), 2008–present)
- Vlado Bis – bass, backing vocals (2018–present)

Former members

- Majo Chromý – guitar, vocals 1995–1996
- Marek "Cibi" Cibula – vocals 1996–1999, S&V Tour 2005
- Noro Komada – drums 1995
- Tibor Prikler – guitar 2000–2002
- Dano Mathia – drums 2000–2003
- Jano Rozbora – drums 2003–2006 (except S&V Tour)
- Mario "Wayo" Praženec – bass 1995–2000, bass 2005 (S&V Tour), 2008–2011
- Roman "Hulo" Hulin - guitar (2011-2014), bass (2014–2016), backing vocals (2014–2016)
- Peter "Forus" Fóra – bass, vocals 2000–2014 (except S&V Tour), (2016-2018)

Guest musicians

- Richard Barger – bass (1995)
- Tomáš "YXO" Dohňanský – guitar (1998)
- Peter "FIXKY" Kudola – guitar (1999 Vitaj tour)
- Robo Bop The Pop – guitar (1999)
- Mára Fára – guitar
- Matej Turcer – guitar
- Lukáš Macák - vocals

Timeline

== Discography ==
=== Albums ===
- Vitaj! (1998)
- Čumil (1999)
- Je Tu Niekto? (2000)
- Príbeh (2001)
- Bez Udania Dôvodu (2003)
- Právo Na Šťastie (2011)
- Nevhodný Typ (2015)
- Made In Czechoslovakia (2022)

=== Compilations ===
- Najlepších 15 Rockov (2010)
- 22 Svetelných Rokov (Best Of) (2017)

=== Demo ===
- Kachny (1996)
- Situácia (1997)
- Situácia & Kachny (reissue 2002)

=== Video ===
- Live in Praha (2009)
- 25 Rokov Symphonic - Live In Bratislava (2021)

=== Singles and music videos (*) ===
1. 090x (1998, Vitaj!)*
2. Závisť (1998, Vitaj!)
3. Veľkou Palicou (1999, Vitaj!)
4. Svätý Pokoj (1999, Čumil)
5. Čumil (1999, Čumil)*
6. Vianoce (1999, Čumil, 1999)*
7. Kto Na To Príde? (2000, Je Tu Niekto?)*
8. Úspešne Zapojení (2000, Je Tu Niekto?)*
9. Ráno (2000, Je Tu Niekto?)*
10. Mám Pocit... (2001, Je Tu Niekto?)*
11. Kašovité Jedlá (2001, Príbeh)
12. Ďakujeme Vám (2001, Príbeh)*
13. Ružová Záhrada (2001, Príbeh)*
14. Prečo Je To Tak? (2002, Príbeh)
15. Záverečná (2002, Príbeh)
16. Veľkou Palicou III (2003, Bez Udania Dôvodu)*
17. Spomienky Na Budúcnosť (2003, Bez Udania Dôvodu)*
18. Krvavá Blondína (2004, Bez Udania Dôvodu)*
19. Alibi (2004, Bez Udania Dôvodu)*
20. Svätý Pokoj (live) (2008)*
21. Déjà Vu (studio version / live version*) (2010, Najlepších 15 Rockov)
22. Mojich Najlepších 15 Rockov (normal version* / unplugged version) (2010, Najlepších 15 Rockov)
23. Petra Po Rokoch (2011, Právo Na Šťastie)
24. Ani Minútu (2011, Právo Na Šťastie)*
25. Špinavé Objatie (2011, Právo Na Šťastie)*
26. Právo Na Šťastie (2012, Právo Na Šťastie)*
27. Figúrka (2012, Právo Na Šťastie)*
28. Karanténa Citov (2013, Právo Na Šťastie)*
29. Strom (2014)
30. Nevhodný Typ (2014, Nevhodný Typ)*
