= Kelly L. Moran =

American artist and writer

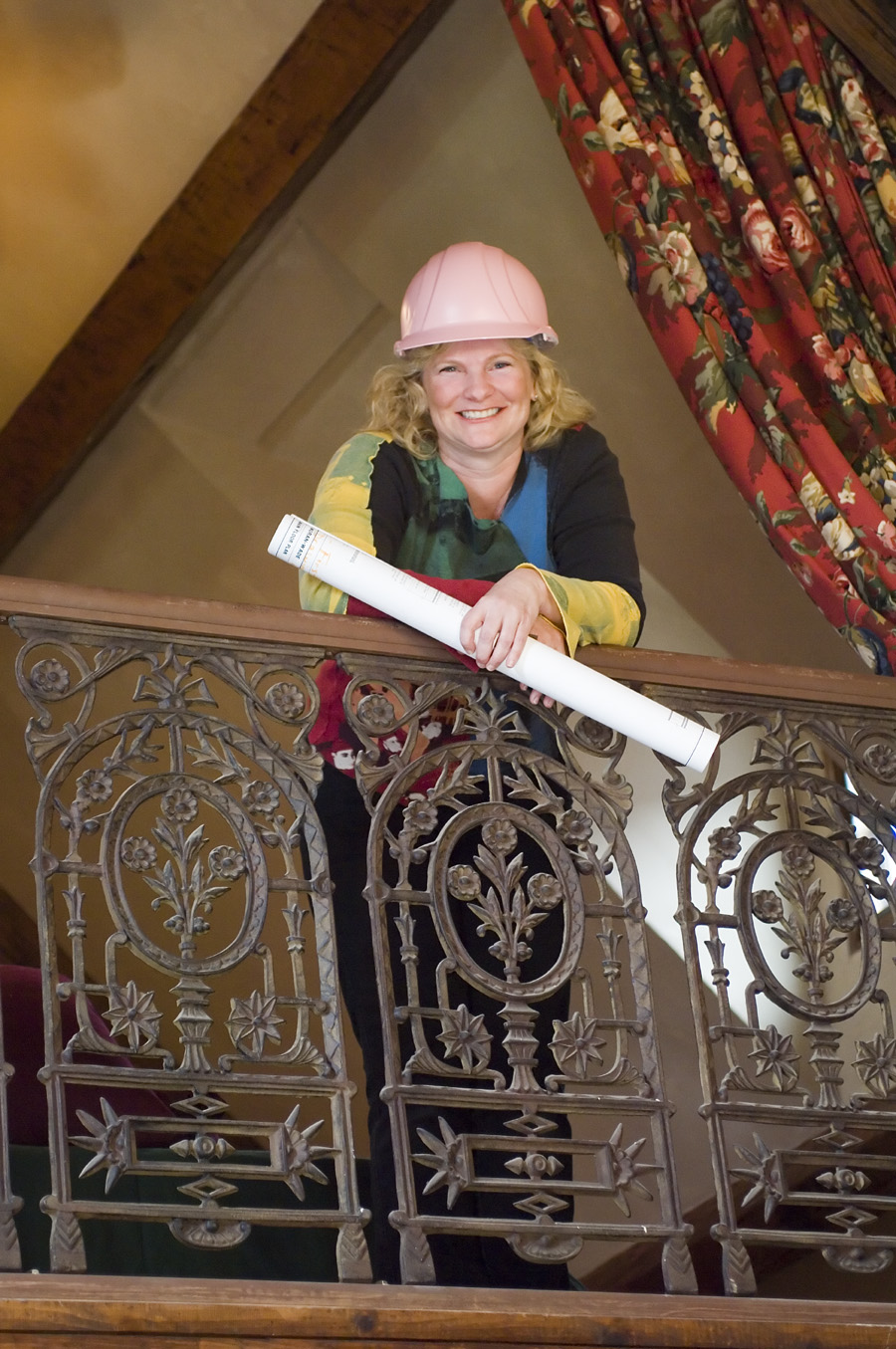
- Born: Kelly Lynne Moran; Cumberland, Maryland
- Status: Married
- Education: B.A. from Frostburg State University
- Occupations: Author, artist, designer, gardener, builder
- Spouse: Steven Michael Wade
- Children: Liam Michael Wade; Kim Wade

Kelly Lynne Moran (born March 30, 1960) is an American artist, author and builder. The Washington Times newspaper wrote "she is also one heck of a designer." She has a degree in Fine Arts from Frostburg State University, graduating in 1982 and continually trains at the Schuler School of Fine Arts in Baltimore, Maryland, painting in the 16th century Dutch Old Masters' style. She continued her education at the George Washington University in 1995 studying Landscape Design and the USDA Graduate School studying Botany, and Horticulture. Working as a landscape designer in the Washington, D.C., metro area landed Moran on Fox 5 News in 2002, at 5:00 doing gardening segments.

== Designing ==
She designed a garden bench with open lattice sides, a solid back and roof called a "Love Cupboard" based on a bench designed by William Kent for Rousham Gardens during the early 18th century. Her covered bench design has been featured in many national publications.

== Publications ==
In 1999 Moran wrote her first book, Shelley Chintz, Unlocking the Secrets of the Pattern Books, which received media coverage on Fox 5 News, Discovery Channel, Discovery Home Channel and Comcast morning news show. In 2002, Browntrout Publishers produced a calendar using images from her book. The calendar was called "Tea With Kelly" Browntrout Publishers produces only six other calendars named after people (Marilyn Monroe, James Dean, Audrey Hepburn, The Beatles, the Three Stooges and Anne Geddes).

== 9/11 commemoration event ==
In 2001 Kelly hosted an Afternoon Tea for the families of the 125 victims killed on 9/11 in The Pentagon and the 54 people killed on board Flight 77. The event was held at the St. Regis Hotel, in Washington, D.C., on Saturday, December 8, 2001. This event was the only civilian event sanctioned by the Pentagon who assisted with the mailing of the invitations as well as attending the function. Celebrities such as actress Goldie Hawn, D.C. Mayor Anthony A. Williams' mother Virginia Williams, and the Washington, D.C., NHL Washington Capitals also attended. The event was covered by ABC News Channel 7, Fox 5 News, NBC channel 4, CBS WUSA 9 New and News Channel 8 and the Army Times Newspaper.
