= Slobodná Európa =

Slovak punk rock band

Slobodná Európa (translates to Free Europe) is a Slovak punk-rock music group formed in 1989.

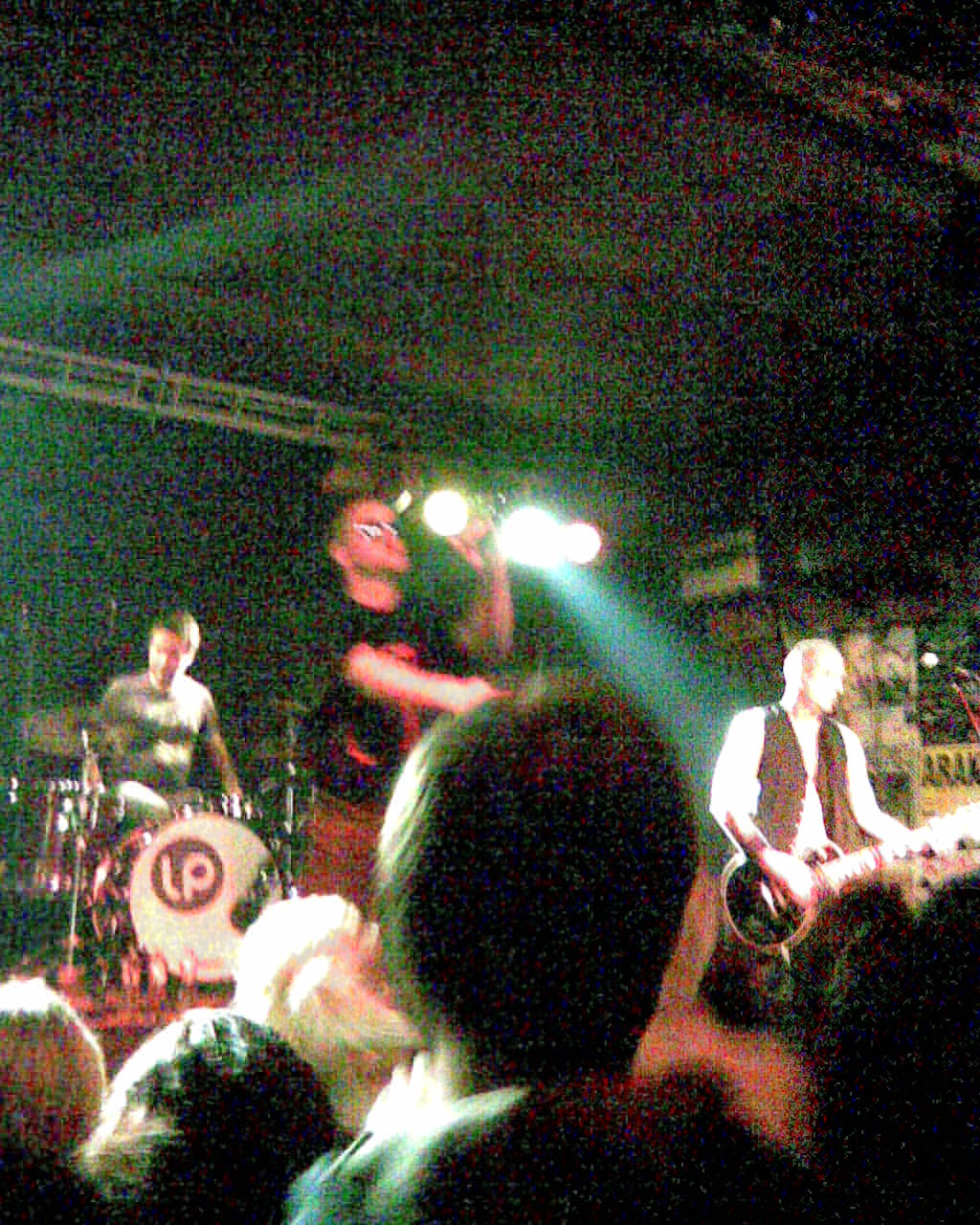
Slobodna Europa

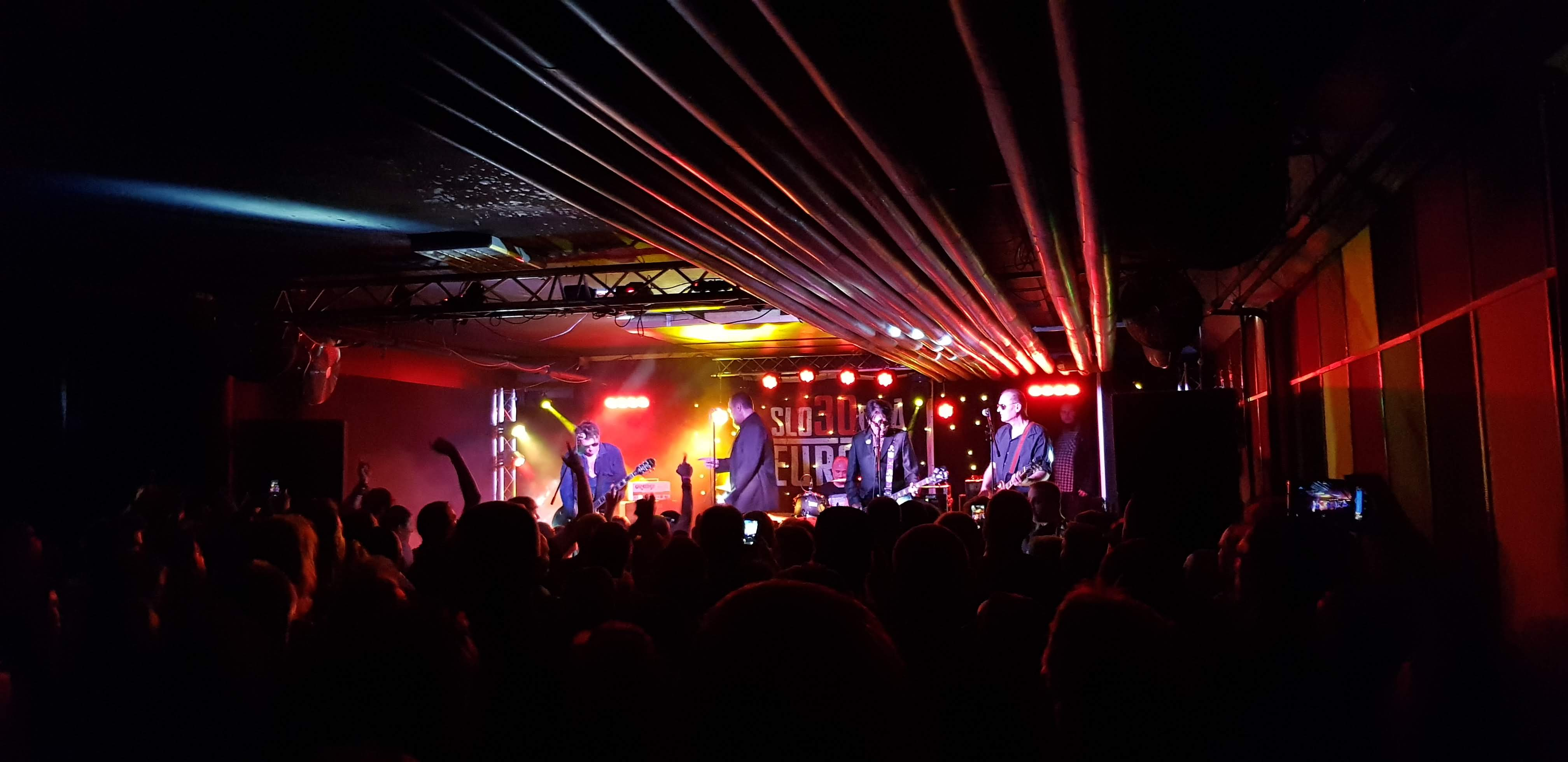
Slobodná Európa v Žiline

== History ==
The band was formed by Braňo Alex (bass) (ex-member of Zóna A), Sveto Korbel (guitar) (also an ex-member of Zóna A, left in early 1988), Ozi (real name Peter Hurtig, drums)(ex-member of Zóna A) and vocalist Whisky (real name Milo Láber). In 1991 they released the first album Pakáreň through Opus Records. Ozi leaves the band after the release and is replaced by Juraj Černý, at that time also a member of hard rock/heavy metal band Tublatanka, who played drums on two tracks from Pakáreň. Shortly afterwards the band adds secondary drummer Čunďo (Roman Čunderlík) who variously switches places with Černý until 1994. Band members took hard drugs (heroin with methamphetamine) that would influence their darker second album Unavení a zničení (trans. Tired and Broken) but eventually also almost destroy their lives. Due to various problems, the band went on hiatus in 1995.

Slobodná Európa reformed in 2002 when Whisky married Dorota Nvotová. Černý, who was a part of the reunion, is soon replaced by Tuleň (Tomáš Vojtek) and the band records their new album Trojka. In 2004 the band adds new guitarist Temo (Braňo Černák) who also fills in for Korbel during latter's personal hiatus from the band between 2004 and 2006. Tuleň left in 2006 and was replaced by Juraj Vitez. In 2011 Černý returned to the band. Alex was dropped from the line-up in 2012 for health reasons and drug addiction and was replaced by Žumo. This line-up recorded and released fourth album Štvorka in 2014.

== Members ==
=== Current ===
- Whisky (Milo Láber) - lead vocals (1989–present)
- Sveťo Korbel - guitars (1989–present)
- Temo/Temeraf (Braňo Černák) - guitars (2004–present)
- Žumo (Martin Zimanyi) - bass (2012–present)
- Tuleň (Tomáš Vojtek) - drums (2002–2006, 2016–present)

=== Past ===
- Braňo Alex - bass (1989–2012)
- Ozi (Peter Hurtig) - drums (1989–1991)
- Čunďo (Roman Čunderlík) - drums (1991–1995)
- Juraj Vitez - drums (2006–2011)
- Juraj Černý - drums (1991–1994, 2002, 2011–2016, died in 2016)

== Discography ==
=== Studio albums ===
- Pakáreň (1991)
- Unavení a zničení (1994)
- Trojka (2003)
- Štvorka (2014)

=== Compilations ===
- Bestofka (2006)

=== Music videos ===
- Ivan (1990)
- Ráno 1.2.91 (1991)
- Pakáreň II (1992)
- Podvod (1994)
- Dry '69 (1994)
- Relatívny pokoj (2003)
- Pes (2003)
- Kapitalizmus (2006)
- Vesmír (2014)

== See also ==
- The 100 Greatest Slovak Albums of All Time
