= The Voice Česko Slovensko =

Reality television singing competition

- Created by: John de Mol Jr. Roel van Velzen
- Presented by: Leoš Mareš; Tina; Tereza Kerndlová; Mária Čírová
- Judges: Josef Vojtek; Michal David; Dara Rolins; Rytmus; Dara & Marta; Majk Spirit; Vojtěch Dyk; Jana Kirschner; Kali
- Country of origin: Czech Republic / Slovakia
- Original language: Czech / Slovak
- No. of seasons: 3
- No. of episodes: 60

Production
- Executive producers: Milan Alchus; Branislav Mensátor; Michaela Petržílková
- Producer: Talpa Media Group
- Running time: 90 mins

Original release
- Network: Nova / Markíza
- Release: 12 February 2012 – 18 June 2014
- Release: 10 February – 25 May 2019

The Voice Česko Slovensko (Czech and Slovak for The Czech / Slovak Voice, literally The Voice of Czecho Slovakia, previously Hlas Česko Slovenska) is a reality singing competition and version of The Voice of Holland for Czech Republic and Slovakia. It is broadcast on TV Nova in Czech Republic and TV Markíza in Slovakia, both stations are owned by CME. It is derived from the original The Voice of Holland. The concept of the competition consists of searching for singer talents (from the second row and duets) over 16 years of age in public casting. The winner is later determined on the basis of a voting vote by SMS, which receives financial rewards and the ability to upload his own album.

As Czech and Slovak are very similar, it is a bilingual show. People from Czech Republic are speaking the Czech language when people from Slovakia are speaking the Slovak language. Czechs and Slovaks in this show are communicating jointly without language change. People from all other countries are communicating in English or its native language, with assistance of a translator.

The Voice was first introduced to viewers in Czech Republic and Slovakia on 12 February 2012, when 1.119 million viewers watched it on average. In the competition, the coaches choose their competitors only according to their voice, who then compete against each other. Not only competitors but also coaches compete because the coach just wants to be what Voice shows. The first coaches were Dara Rolins, Michal David, Josef Vojtek and Rytmus. The show is moderated by Leoš Mareš and Tina. This season was won by Slovak Ivanna Bagová.

On 19 November 2013, it was announced that Voice returned to the second season, which began broadcast on 5 March 2014, and ended on 18 June 2014 with the victory of Lenka Hrůzová. He also recently appeared in Sunday's slot, not Sunday, as he has done so far. This season was won by Czech Lenka Hrůzová.

On 15 June 2018, TV Nova announced on its Facebook site that the third line was being produced under the English name The Voice Czech Republic. At the same time, the castings were announced in a new season, where participants can sign up using the Nova and Markíza websites. Eventually, the name The Voice Česko Slovensko was adopted. This season was won by Annamária D'Almeida, a Slovak of Benin origin.

== Format ==
Logo used from 2012 to 2014

Each year begins with "Blind Selections," where coaches compose their team of singers (14 in the first year, 12 in the second) with whom they will work during the competition. The coach is facing the back of the contestant in the chair, if the coach likes the show, he presses the "I want you" button and the chair immediately turns towards the contestant with the shining sign I want you to. After being cheered, the competitor is automatically assigned to the team of the coach who chose him. If more coaches have turned, the singer chooses himself to which team he will go.

The next part of the competition is "duels." Each coach will form in his team two couples who will compete in a duel and sing one common song. The coach then decides whom to keep in his team. In the first year, the coaches invited their mentor to help them in their decisions (Linda Fink, Vašo Patejdl, Tonya Graves and Tomi Popovič). Since the second year, a new element of theft has been introduced, when a disqualified competitor could take another coach to the team and save him from falling out.

The new part from the second row is "K.O." Team contestants are here again divided into pairs, but each singers sing their song. The coach decides who else to send and who will end up in the competition.

At the final stage of the Live Transmission Competition, the singers sing other songs each week, and the competitor leaves the contest for a week until the winner of the contest is announced. Their audience decides about their fate using SMS votes. The competition leaves the contestants with the smallest number of votes from each team. In the first year each week was dedicated to only two teams separately, so after 14 days each competitor left each competition from each team. Fourteen days before the final, each team participated each week. Progress was made by the competitor with the highest number of points he could get by the number of votes and points from the coach. In each team, the number of votes cast by the spectators was converted to a percentage, and then the points were scored by the coach who had a total of 100 and had to divide them between two contestants from his team. In the second year, this principle was no longer used, with four teams playing every week, and only viewers were taking their decision.

== Coaches and hosts ==
Seasons
Coach	1	2	3
Pepa Vojtek			
Michal David			
Dara Rolins			
Marta Jandová			
Rytmus			
Majk Spirit			
Vojtěch Dyk			
Jana Kirschner			
Kali			

Coaches gallery

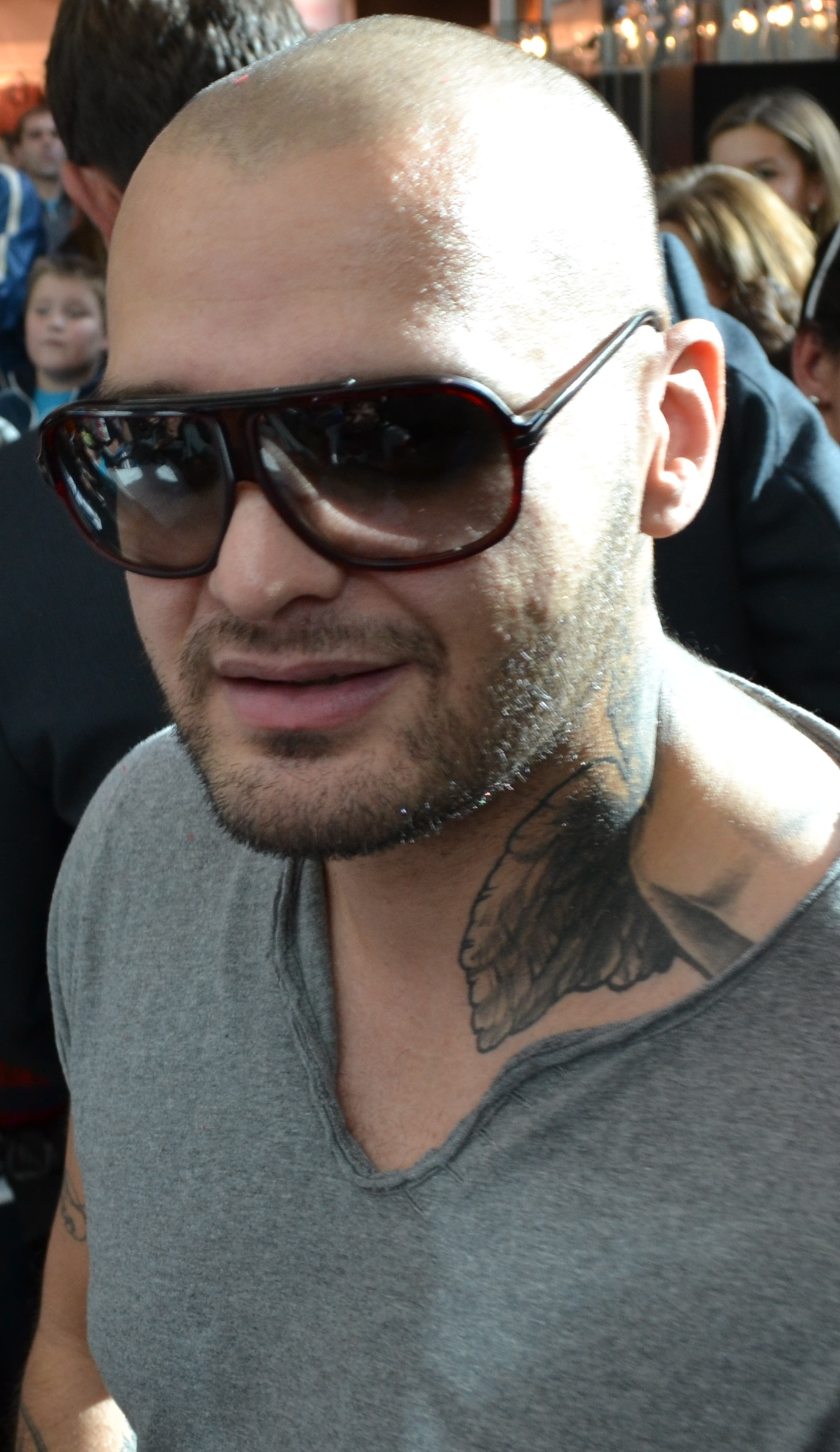
Rytmus (2012)

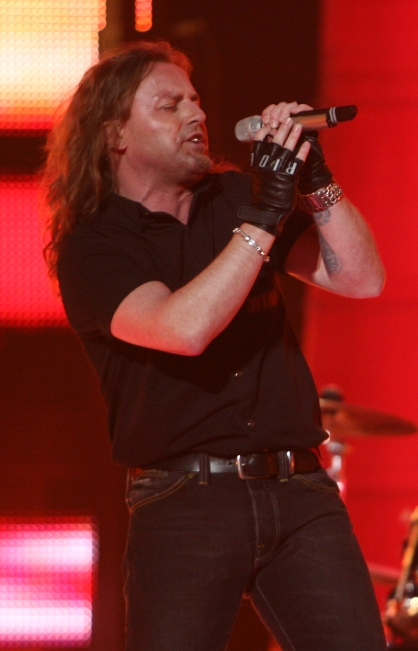
Josef "Pepa" Vojtek (2012-2019)

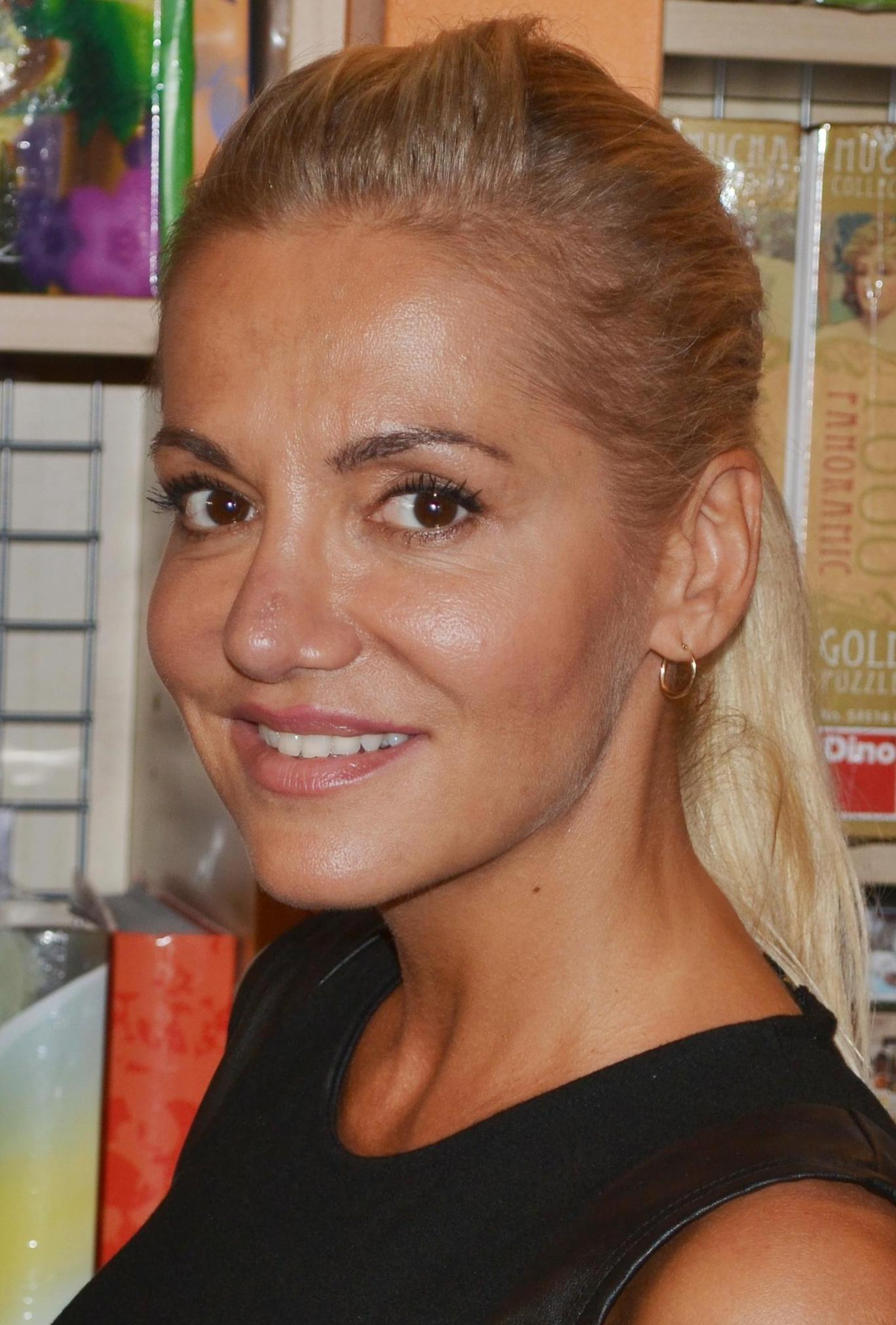
Dara Rolins (solo, 2012; duo, 2014)

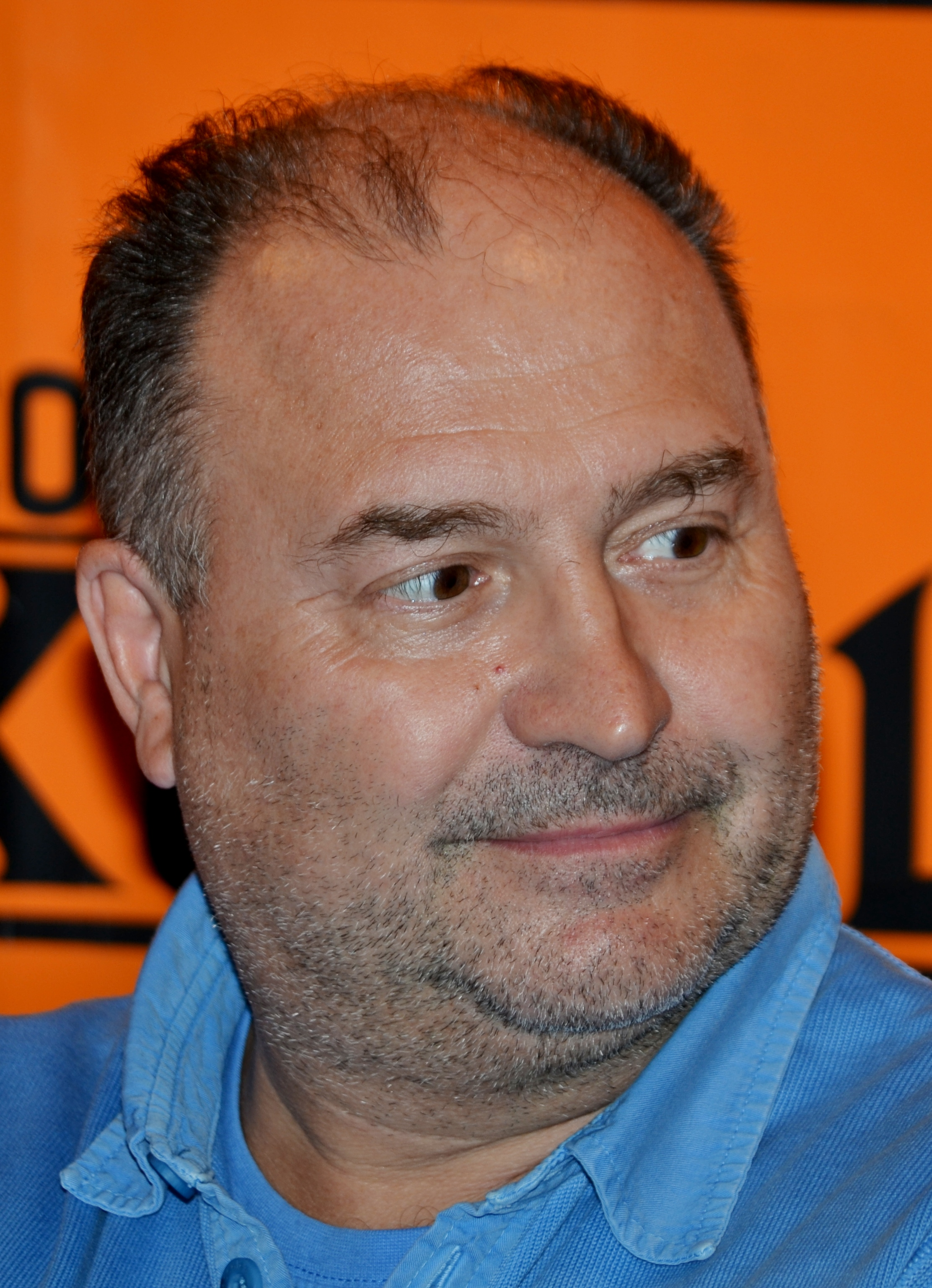
Michal David (2012-2014)

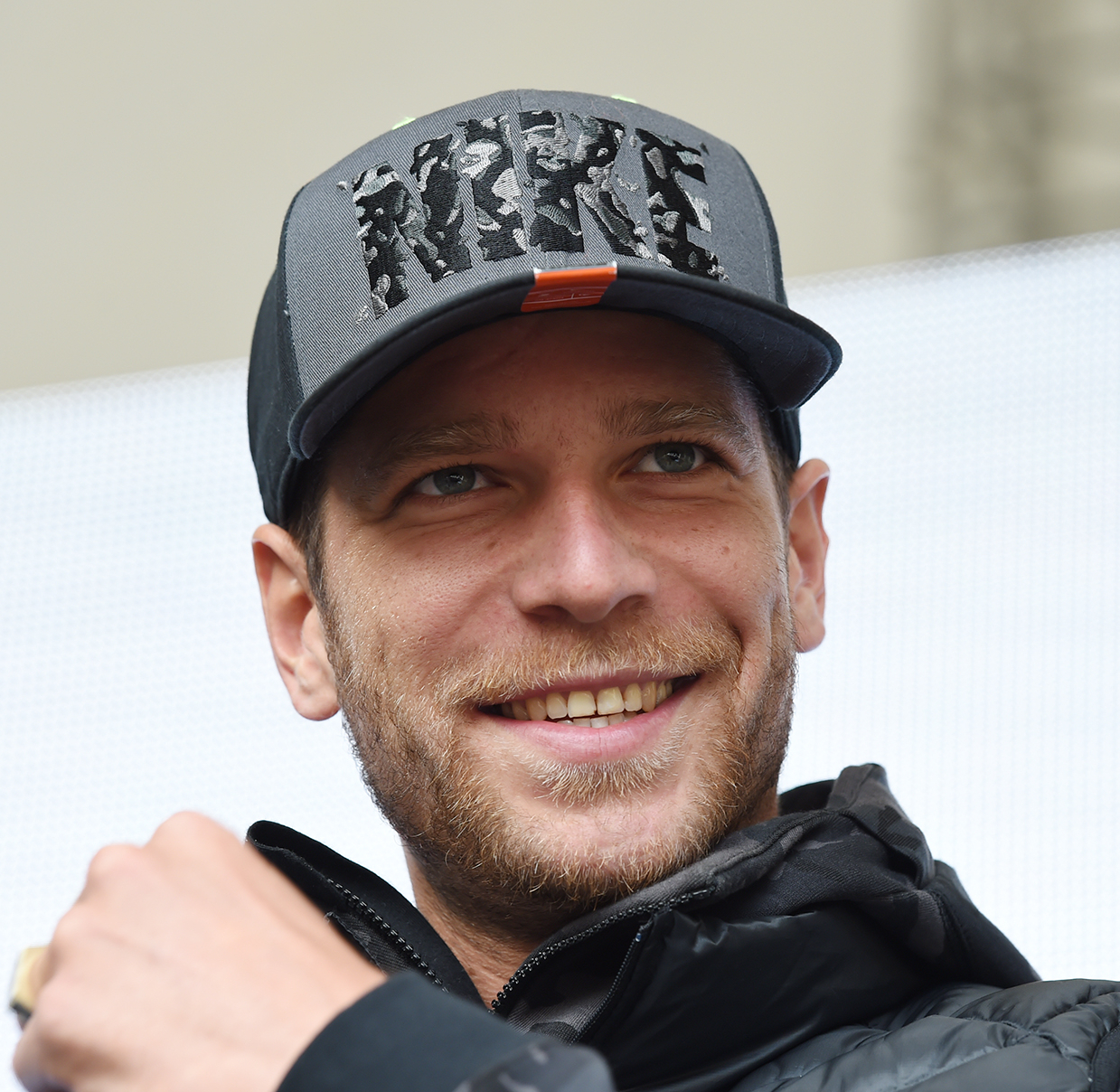
Majk Spirit (2014)

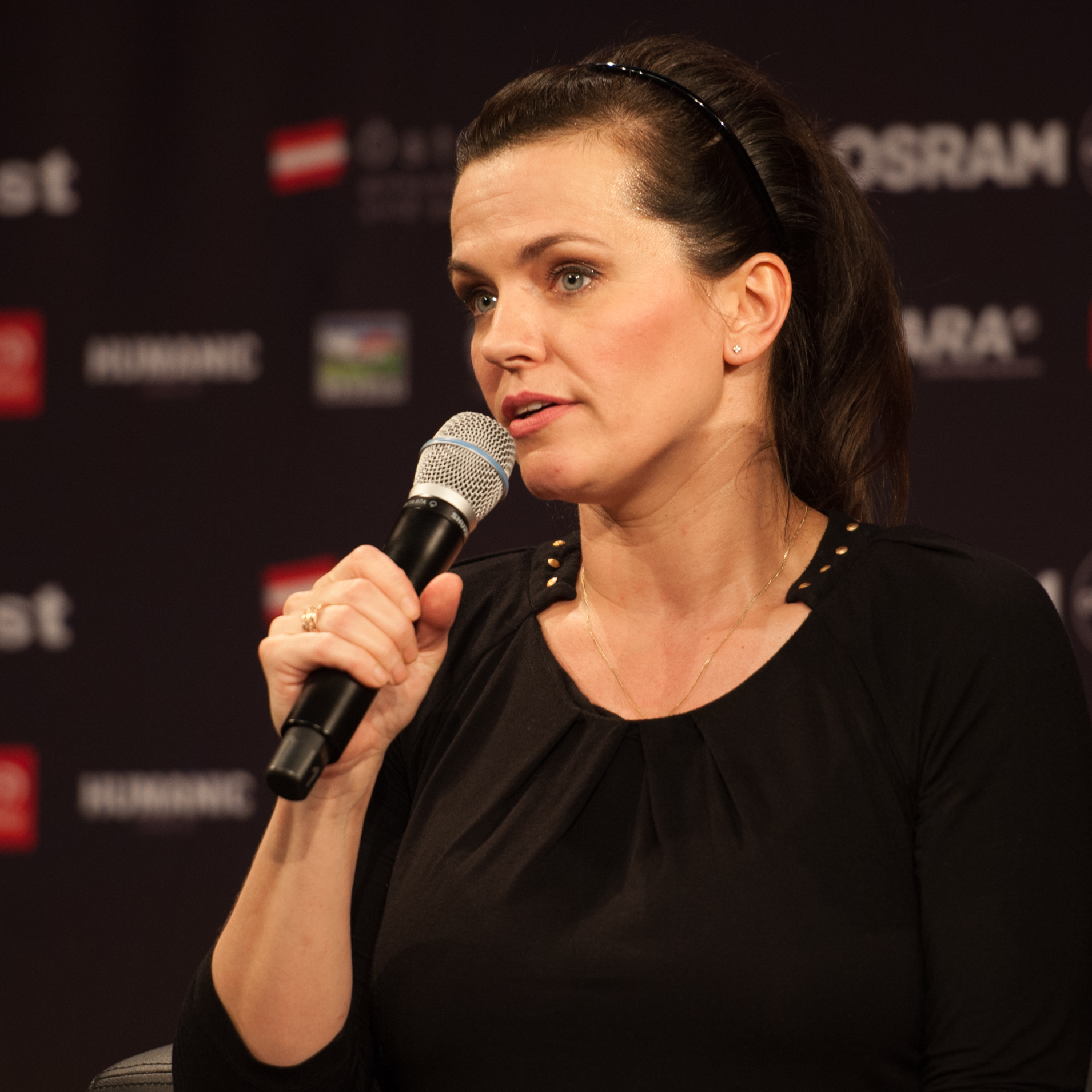
Marta Jandová (duo, 2014)

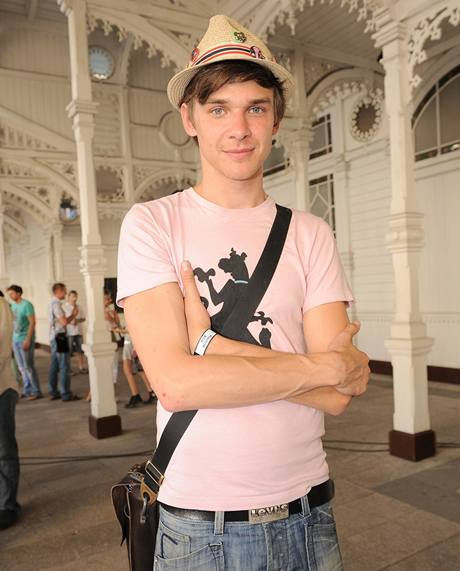
Vojtěch Dyk (2019)

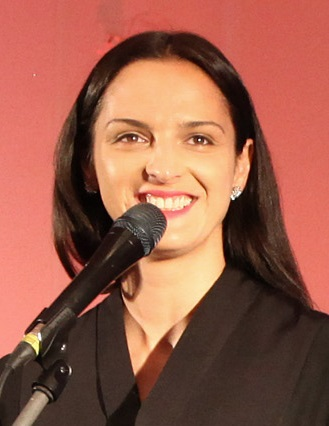
Jana Kirschner (2019)

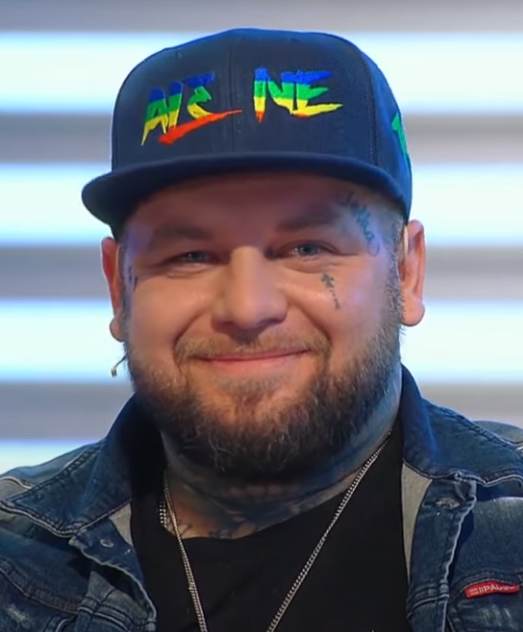
Kali (2019)

=== Presenters ===
Seasons
Presenter	1	2	3
Leoš Mareš			
Tina			
Tereza Kerndlová			
Mária Čírová			

Presenters gallery

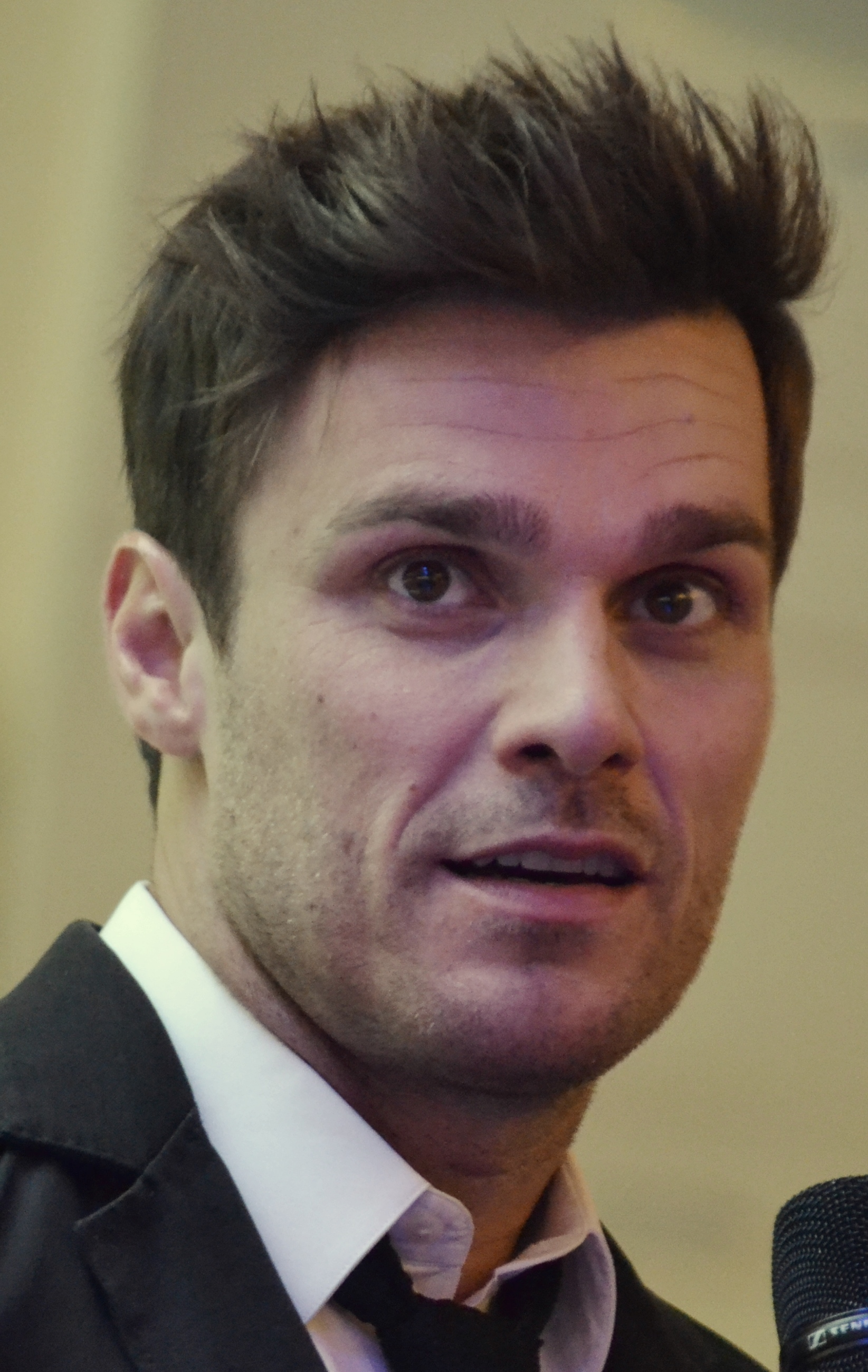
Leoš Mareš (2012, 2014)

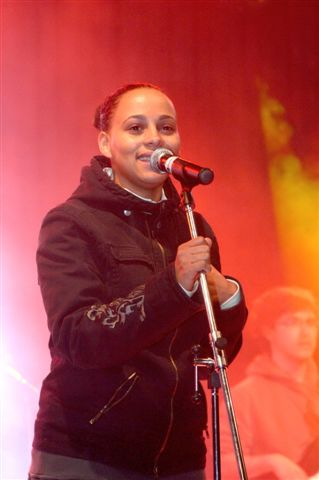
Tina (2012, 2014)

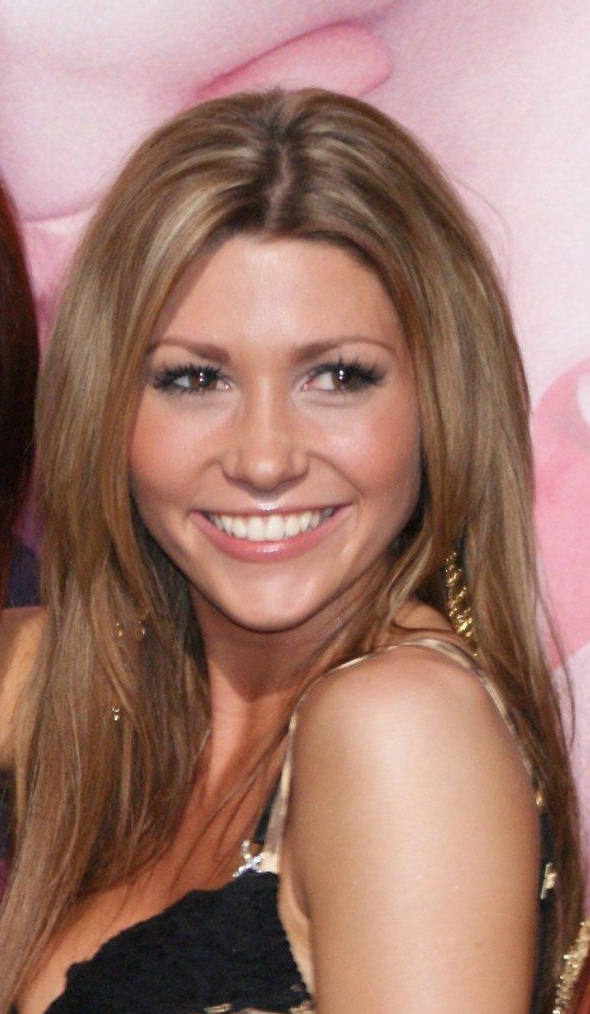
Tereza Kerndlová (2019)

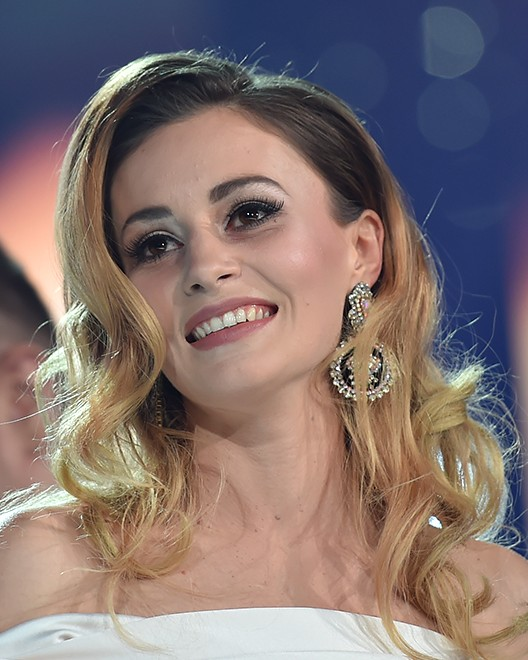
Mária Čírová (2019)

=== Coaches' teams ===
Color key:

– Winning
– Runner-Up
– Third place
– Fourth place

Season
Season	Josef Vojtek	Rytmus	Dara Rolins	Michal David
1	Markéta Pouličková; Barbora Švidraňová; Daniel Mrózek; Kristína Zakuciová; Jakub Pohle; Veronika Vrublová	Anna Veselovská; Juraj Zaujec; Nikoleta Spalasová; Kristýna Daňhelová; Adam Koubek; Michal Chrenko	Miloš Novotný; Zuzana Mikulcová; Dominika Šuľáková; Katarína Demská; Simona Hégerová; David Bísek	Ivanna Bagová; Brunno Oravec; Kateřina Petráňová; Petr Kutheil; David Weingartner; Alžbeta Pažoutová
Season
Season	Josef Vojtek	Majk Spirit	Dara Rolins & Marta Jandová	Michal David
2	Lenka Hrůzová; Simona Gážiková; Edita Třísková; Viktor Homolek	Martin Císar; Blanka & Martin; Veronika Strapková; Kristína Mihaľová	Andrea Holá; Jana Rybníčková; Eliška Mrázová; Marek Relich	Vendula Příhodová; Andrea Janczarová; Zolo Lebo; Martin Kujan
Season
Season	Josef Vojtek	Kali	Jana Kirschner	Vojtěch Dyk
3	Jakub Moulis; Aleksandra Nová; Adriana Bessogonov	Annamária D'Almeida; Diana Kalashová; Kristián Révay	Peter Juhás; Valentína Vlková; Michaela Husárová	Eliška Urbanová; Markéta Chladová; Dominik Hanza

== Series overview ==
Colour key

Team Pepa
Team Dara
Team Rytmus
Team Michal
Team Dara & Marta
Team Majk
Team Vojtěch
Team Jana
Team Kali

Season	First aired	Last aired	Winner	Runner-up	Third place	Fourth place	Winning coach	Hosts	Coaches (chairs' order)			
Season	First aired	Last aired	Winner	Runner-up	Third place	Fourth place	Winning coach	Hosts	1	2	3	4
1	12 Feb 2012	3 June 2012	Ivanna Bagová	Anna Veselovská	Markéta Pouličková	Miloš Novotný	Michal David	Leoš Mareš, Tina (backstage)	Pepa	Michal	Dara	Rytmus
2	5 Feb 2014	18 May 2014	Lenka Hrůzová	Vendula Příhodová	Martin Císar	Andrea Holá	Josef Vojtek	Leoš Mareš, Tina (backstage)	Michal	Pepa	Dara & Marta	Majk
3	10 Feb 2019	25 May 2019	Annamária D'Almeida	Jakub Moulis	Eliška Urbanová	Peter Juhás	Kali	Tereza Kerndlová, Mária Čírová	Pepa	Jana	Kali	Vojtěch

== See also ==
- The Voice (franchise)
