= Dara Rolins discography =

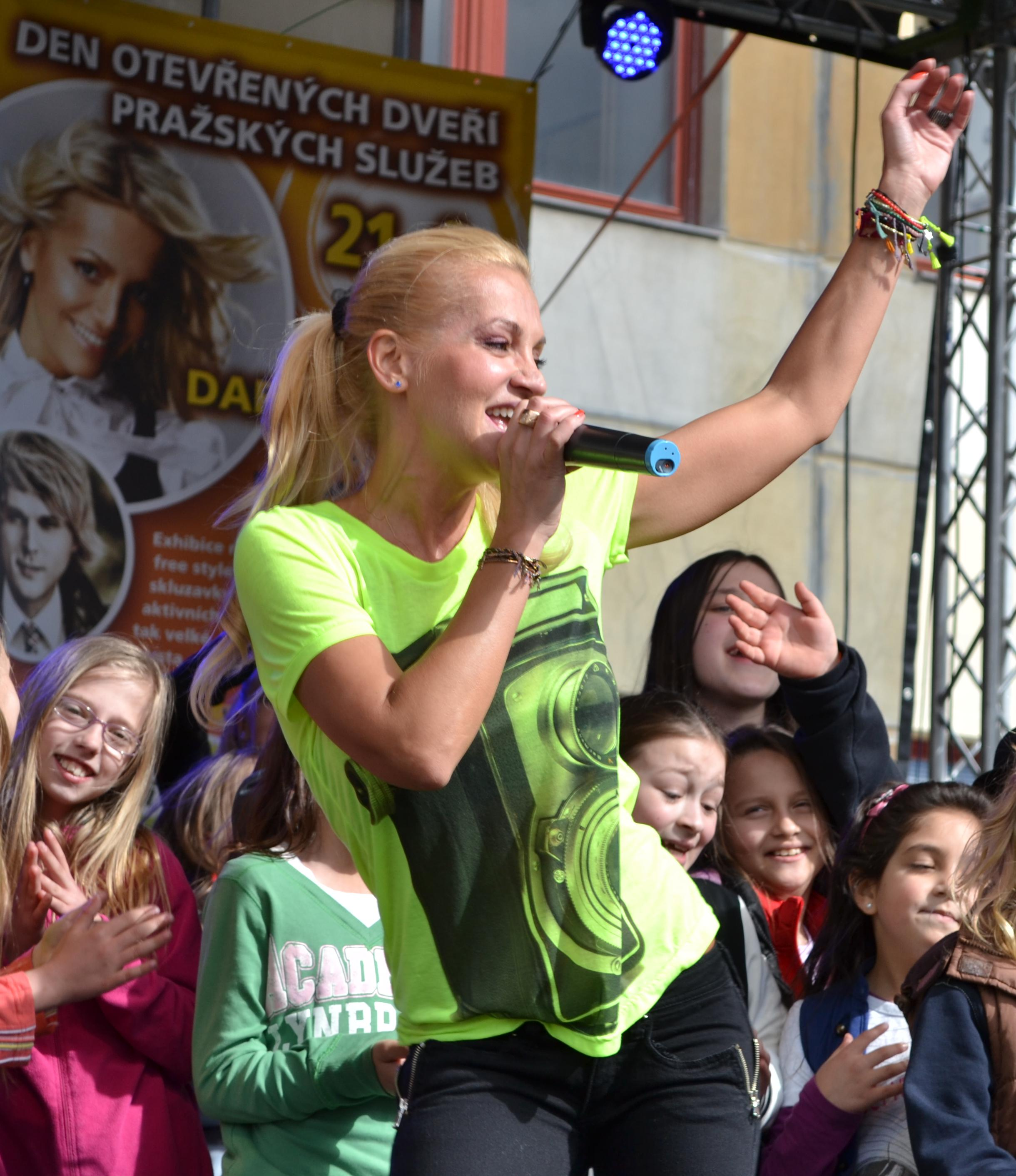
- Rolins performing at the ZEVO Opening Day in Prague, Czech Republic, on April 21, 2012.
- Studio albums: 9
- Extended plays: 1
- Soundtrack albums: 3
- Live albums: 1
- Compilation albums: 1
- Singles: 26
- Remix albums: 1
- Spoken word: 2

The discography of Slovak singer Dara Rolins consists of nine studio albums, one extended play, three soundtrack albums, one live album, one compilation album, 26 singles, one remix album, and two spoken word albums.

== Albums ==
=== Studio albums ===
Year	Album details	Peak	
Year	Album details	CZ	SK
1983	Keby som bola princezná Arabela: Label: OPUS (#9113 1470); Format: LP, CC	—	—
1986	Darinka: Label: Supraphon (#1113 4080); Format: LP, CC	—	—
1988	Čo o mne vieš: Label: Supraphon (#10 4227-2 311); Format: LP, CC	—	—
1996	What You See is What You Get: Label: BMG (#74321 26521); Format: CC	—	—
1997	Sen lásky: Label: BMG (#74321 53707); Format: CD	—	—
1998	Butcher's on the Road with Sexy Dancers: Label: Bonton (#71 0625); Format: CD	—	—
2002	What's my name: Label: Epic (#504174); Format: CD	24	—
2006	D1: Label: Epic (#82876 82219); Format: CD	2	—
2011	Stereo: Label: EMI (#590166 912528); Format: CD	3	—
2017	ETC: Label: EMI; Format: CD, download	8	1

=== Remix albums ===
Year	Album details	Peak
Year	Album details	CZ
2008	D2: Remixy: Label: Epic (#86972 71582); Format: CD	3

=== Live albums ===
Year	Album details	Peak
Year	Album details	CZ
2009	Šťastné a veselé: Label: Universal (#2729870); Format: CD	18

=== Soundtracks ===
Year	Album details	Peak
Year	Album details	CZ
1985	Cengá do triedy: Label: OPUS; Format: LP, MC	
1990	Témeř ružový příběh: Label: Supraphon; Format: LP, CC	
2011	V peřině: Label: Universal; Format: CD	7

=== Compilations ===
Year	Album details
2005	1983-1998: Label: Bonton (#491526); Format: CD

=== Export albums ===
Year	Album details
1988	You Hardly Know Me: Label: Supraphon; Format: LP

=== Special editions ===
Year	Album details
2010	100 základných albumov a interprétov: Label: OPUS (#91 0124); Format: 2CD

=== Spoken word ===
Year	Album details
1982	Rozprávkový autobus: Label: OPUS; Format: LP, CC
1983	Drevený tato: Label: OPUS (#9118 1350); Format: LP

== Extended plays ==
Year	EP details	Peak	Sales	Notes
Year	EP details	SK	Sales	Notes
2005	VyVolení: Label: bRjAN Music(#BA 0017–5–331); Format: CD	1	SK: 15,000	Four track EP featuring "Ide o život" by Rolins recorded for TV reality show VyVolení. Bonus material included a video performed by contestants. Her song was later issued on D1.
2011	Mono: Label: EMI (#none); Format: download	—		Five track digital EP issued prior to Stereo release, featuring "My Time (K.Pobořil Remix)", "Doctor Love", "Otázky" with Dan Bárta, "I've Got Nothing" and "My Time (LP Version)".
"—" denotes a release that did not chart or was not released in that region.

== Singles ==
=== As lead artist ===
Year	Single details	Top positions		Sales	Album	Label
Year	Single details	CZ	SK	Sales	Album	Label
1982	"Detská diskotéka" with Ivan Krajíček				non-album single	OPUS
1983	"Kapela snov"				non-album single	Supraphon
1983	"O tom budem píseň hrát"				Darinka	Supraphon
1984	"Zvonky štěstí" with Karel Gott			200,000	(VA) Tip Top 2	Supraphon
1986	"Tanec v daždi"				non-album single	Supraphon
1987	"Kto chce"				non-album single	Supraphon
1987	"Čo o mne vieš"				Čo o mne vieš	Supraphon
1990	"Skús ma nájsť"				non-album single	Supraphon
1996	"I See You There"				What You See is What You Get'	BMG
1996	"Our Lovin'"				What You See is What You Get'	BMG
1996	"What You See is What You Get"				What You See is What You Get'	BMG
Airplay singles
2006	"Túžim"	30	27		D1	Epic
2006	"Nádych, výdych"	30	—		D1	Epic
2006	"Party DJ" featuring Rytmus	—	—		D1	Epic
2007	"Štěstí chce tebe"	55	—		non-album single	Sony
2008	"Voľný pád" featuring Orion	54	44		D2: Remixy	Epic
2008	"Slowly (MJ Cole 2-Step Remix)"^{[A]}	—	—		D2: Remixy	Prolific
2009	"Zvonky štěstí 2009" with Karel Gott	47	—		Šťastné a veselé	Universal
2009	"Šťastné vianoce"	—	48		Šťastné a veselé	Universal
2011	"Naskoč a leť"	—	53		Stereo	EMI
2011	"Nebo, peklo, raj" with Tomi Popovič	41	1		Stereo	EMI
2011	"Fóbia"	—	75		Stereo	EMI
2011	"Santa Baby" (by Joan Javits & Philip Springer)	—	46		Šťastné a veselé	EMI
2012	"Ďaleko mi neuleť"	—	—		Stereo	EMI
2013	"Zmena má prísť"	—	42		non-album single	
2015	"Chcem znamenie"	59	62		non-album single	Warner
"—" denotes a single that did not chart or was not released in that region.

Notes

- A "Slowly" was also released on vinyl as a promotional single in UK.

=== As featured artist ===
Year	Single details	Top positions				Album	Label
Year	Single details	AT	DE	CZ	SK	Album	Label
1984	"Aprilové deti" with Peter Nagy	—	—			non-album single	OPUS
1985	"Nejhezčí dárek" with Jiří Zmožek	—	—			Nejhezčí dárek	Supraphon
1985	"Fang das Licht" with Karel Gott	7	15			Karel Gott Spezial	Polydor
1986	"Gib mir ein Zeichen" with Karel Gott	—	—			non-album single	Polydor
1996	"Reunited" with Johnny Logan	—	—			Reach Out	BMG
1998	"Slim Jim" with Sexy Dancers	—	—			Butcher's on the Road	Bonton
Airplay singles
2009	"Tráva" with Petr Bende	—	—	—	36	Vánoční koncert	BMG
"—" denotes a single that did not chart or was not released in that region.

== Other appearances ==
Year	Song	Notes
1987	"Eine Muh, eine Mäh"	Appears on German Christmas compilation Winterland – Wunderland: Schlager zur Winterzeit by Various artists, released on Amiga.
1987	"Weihnachten steht vor der Tür"	Appears on German Christmas compilation Winterland – Wunderland: Schlager zur Winterzeit by Various artists, released on Amiga.
1987	"Du lieber Weihnachtsmann"	Appears on German Christmas compilation Winterland – Wunderland: Schlager zur Winterzeit by Various artists, released on Amiga.
1987	"Wieder geht ein Jahr zu Ende (Deck The Hall)"	Appears on German Christmas compilation Winterland – Wunderland: Schlager zur Winterzeit by Various artists, released on Amiga.
1988	"Škriatok"	Appears on Supraphon compilation Šmoulové, which featured contributions by Petra Janů, Stanislav Hložek, Hana Zagorová, Michal David, Linda Finková, Jiří Korn, Dagmar Patrasová, Michal Penk, Josef Laufer, Iveta Bartošová, Karel Gott, Bambini di Praga & Gemini. (The second track featured)
1988	"Šmoulí song" with Various artists	Appears on Supraphon compilation Šmoulové, which featured contributions by Petra Janů, Stanislav Hložek, Hana Zagorová, Michal David, Linda Finková, Jiří Korn, Dagmar Patrasová, Michal Penk, Josef Laufer, Iveta Bartošová, Karel Gott, Bambini di Praga & Gemini. (The second track featured)
1991	"Snehulienka"	From musical theatre Snehulienka a 7 pretekárov by SND. The album included thirteen tracks in total, featuring also contributions by Pavol Habera, Heidi Janků, Ivan Krajíček, Vašo Patejdl, Ján Gallovič, Stano Král, Miro Noga, Dezider Rancsó, Štefan Skrúcaný and Maroš Kramár.
1991	"Stretnutie" with Pavol Habera	From musical theatre Snehulienka a 7 pretekárov by SND. The album included thirteen tracks in total, featuring also contributions by Pavol Habera, Heidi Janků, Ivan Krajíček, Vašo Patejdl, Ján Gallovič, Stano Král, Miro Noga, Dezider Rancsó, Štefan Skrúcaný and Maroš Kramár.
1991	"Veľké finále" with Various artists	From musical theatre Snehulienka a 7 pretekárov by SND. The album included thirteen tracks in total, featuring also contributions by Pavol Habera, Heidi Janků, Ivan Krajíček, Vašo Patejdl, Ján Gallovič, Stano Král, Miro Noga, Dezider Rancsó, Štefan Skrúcaný and Maroš Kramár.
1993	"Better Late than Never"	A song co-written by Rolins for Kool & the Gang album Unite, issued on Culture Press.
1994	"Thumbelina"	Tracks recorded for Thumbelina: O Malence, released on Monitor-EMI.
1994	"Stůj"	Tracks recorded for Thumbelina: O Malence, released on Monitor-EMI.
1994	"Být ti vším II"	Tracks recorded for Thumbelina: O Malence, released on Monitor-EMI.
1994	"Někdo měl mě rád"	Tracks recorded for Thumbelina: O Malence, released on Monitor-EMI.
1994	"Setkání"	Tracks recorded for Thumbelina: O Malence, released on Monitor-EMI.
1994	"Být ti vším III"	Tracks recorded for Thumbelina: O Malence, released on Monitor-EMI.
2001	"Nic nejde vrátit" with Věra Špinarová	Bonus track on Špinarová's set Za vše můžu já, released on Fischer.
2002	"Mávam" with Pavol Hammel	Appears on Hammel's album release Starí kamoši by Sony.
2003	"Zostať smieš (Nize & Slow)" with Helicó	Appears on MyPhilosophy album by Helicó, released on Millenium.
2004	"Nič nie je milšie" with Robo Papp	Appears on Papp's album R'n'P, issued on Millenium.
2005	"Meddley" with DJ Lumier	Recorded live as her guest appearance for Jesus Christ Superstar concert from November 24, 2003 in Pardubice. The stage show was released on CD/DVD by Sony.
2005	"This Jesus Must Die" with Tonya Graves & Dan Bárta	Recorded live as her guest appearance for Jesus Christ Superstar concert from November 24, 2003 in Pardubice. The stage show was released on CD/DVD by Sony.
2008	"Proč jsi pro boha na mě tak zlá?" with Hugo Toxxx	Appears on rapper's album Rok psa,^{[A]} published by Bigg Boss.
2008	"Love Crush" with Dj Mike Trafik & Helena Zeťová	Appears on 2CD hip-hop compilation 20Ers^{[B]} by VA, issued on Mad Drum. (Limited edition of the set featured DVD Making of 20Ers, released as part of December issue of Czech former magazine Filter in 2008.) In 2011, the song was attached to Rollins' Stereo album as well.
2009	"Perfektný svet" with Gladiator	Appears on Hlavu maj hore album by Gladiator, released on Sony.
2010	"Chyť mě jestli na to máš" with PSH	Originally released on PSH's set Epilog^{[C]} by Bigg Boss.
2011	"Slap (My Ass)" with Robo Papp	Alternative remix recorded as a duet with Papp. Original solo version was issued on Rollins' set Stereo.

Notes

- A Rok psa by Hugo Toxxx charted at number twenty-three on the Czech Albums Chart.
- B Various artists compilation 20Ers peaked at number forty-five on the Czech Albums Chart.
- C The PSH's set Epilog scored at number four on the Czech Albums Chart.

== See also ==
- The 100 Greatest Slovak Albums of All Time
