= Voľný pád =

Single by Dara Rolins featuring Orion

from the album D2: Remixy
- Released: March 3, 2008
- Length: 3:53
- Producer(s): DJ Trafic

Dara Rolins singles chronology
"Party DJ" (2006)	"Voľný pád" (2008)	"Zvonky štěstí 2009" (2009)

"Voľný pád" is a song by Slovak singer Dara Rolins, featuring rap by Orion. The composition was released on March 3, 2008 as a download single and issued on the singer's remix album D2: Remixy from 2008.

== Credits and personnel ==
- Dara Rolins – lead vocal
- Orion – rap
- DJ Trafic – remix

== Charts ==
=== Peak positions ===
Chart (2008)	Peak position
Czech Rádio Top 100 Oficiální	54
Czech Rádio CZ 50 Oficiální	11
Slovak Rádio Top 100 Oficiálna	44
Slovak Rádio SK 50 Oficiálna	15

== See also ==
- Dara Rolins discography
