= Patrik Hezucký =

Czech radio presenter (1970–2025)

- Born: 12 February 1970; Prague, Czechoslovakia
- Died: 5 December 2025 (aged 55); Benešov, Czech Republic
- Occupations: Television and radio presenter
- Years active: 1997–2025

Patrik Hezucký (12 February 1970 – 5 December 2025) was a Czech television and radio presenter.

== Life and career ==
Hezucký was born in Prague on 12 February 1970, and studied French for two years in Toulouse at the Alliance française. From 1997, he worked at Radio Evropa 2, where he was known for portraying the fictional character Mr. Mrázek in the program Mrázek – ústředna ('Mrázek – switchboard'), as well as presenting the Ranní show ('Morning Show') alongside Leoš Mareš.

In addition to hosting on the radio, he also dubbed feature films, including Racing Stripes and Charlotte's Web (2006). In 2014, together with Heidi Janků, he presented the show Nobody Is Perfect on TV Barrandov.

Hezucký died of liver cancer on 5 December 2025, at the age of 55.
