= Hlas Česko Slovenska 2014 =

Season of singing competition

- Season 2014
- Hosted by: Leoš Mareš; Tina
- Judges: Josef Vojtek; Majk Spirit; Dara Rolins & Marta Jandová; Michal David
- Winner: Lenka Hrůzová
- Runner-up: Vendula Příhodová

Release
- Original network: TV Markíza; TV Nova
- Original release: March 5, 2014 – 2014

Season chronology
- ← Previous; 2012

Hlas Česko Slovenska (Czech and Slovak for The Czech / Slovak Voice, literally The Voice of Czecho Slovakia) is a reality singing competition and version of The Voice of Holland for Czech Republic and Slovakia. It is part of the international syndication The Voice based on the reality singing competition launched in the Netherlands, created by Dutch television producer John de Mol. It kicked off on March 5, 2014. One of the important premises of the show is the quality of the singing talent. Four coaches, themselves popular performing artists, train the talents in their group and occasionally perform with them. Talents are selected in blind auditions, where the coaches cannot see, but only hear the auditioner.

== Coaches and Finalists ==
– Winning Coach/Contestant. Winners are in bold, eliminated contestants in small font.
– Runner-Up Coach/Contestant. Final contestant first listed.
– 2nd Runner-Up Coach/Contestant. Final contestant first listed.

Judges/Coaches
Josef Vojtek	Michal David	Dara Rolins & Marta Jandová	Majk Spirit
- **Lenka Hrůzová**; - Simona Gážiková; - Viktor Holomek; - Edita Třísková	- Vendula Příhodová; - Zolo Lebo; - Andrea Janczarová; - Martin Kujan	- Andrea Holá; - Eliška Mrázová; - Jana Rybníčková; - Marek Relich	- Martin Císar; - Blanka & Martin; - Kristína Mihaľová; - Veronika Strapková

== Format ==
The series consists of three phases: a blind audition, a battle phase, and live performance shows. Four judges/coaches, all noteworthy recording artists, choose teams of contestants through a blind audition process. Each judge has the length of the auditioner's performance (about one minute) to decide if he or she wants that singer on his or her team; if two or more judges want the same singer (as happens frequently), the singer has the final choice of coach. Each team of singers is mentored and developed by its respective coach. In the second stage, called the battle phase, coaches have two of their team members battle against each other directly by singing the same song together, with the coach choosing which team member to advance from each of four individual "battles" into the first live round. Within that first live round, the surviving acts from each team again compete head-to-head, with a combination of public and jury vote deciding who advances onto the next round. In the final phase, the remaining contestants (top 8) compete against each other in live broadcasts. The television audience and the coaches have equal say 50/50 in deciding who moves on to the final 4 phase. With one team member remaining for each coach, the (final 4) contestants compete against each other in the finale with the outcome decided solely by public vote.

== The Blind Auditions ==
Key	Coach hit his or her "I WANT YOU" button	Contestant eliminated with no coach pressing his or her "I WANT YOU" button	Contestant defaulted to this coach's team	Contestant elected to join this coach's team

=== Episode 1: March 5, 2014 ===
Order	Contestant	Song	Coaches' and Contestants' Choices			
Order	Contestant	Song	Josef	Michal	Dara & Marta	Majk
1	Veronika Strapková	"A Natural Woman"				
2	Jakub Nesnídal	"Jailhouse Rock"				
3	Dagmar Čampulová	"Země vzdálená"	—	—	—	—
4	Zolo Lebo	"When a Man Loves a Woman"	—			
5	Václav Duchek	"Wild Country"	—	—	—	—
6	Katarína Kamencová	"Isn't She Lovely"	—		—	—
7	Zuzana Kamencová	"High"			—	—
8	Jiří Motyčák	"Chci zas v tobě spát"	—	—	—	—
9	Martin & Blanka	"How Do You Keep the Music Playing?"	—			

=== Episode 2: March 12, 2014 ===
Order	Contestant	Song	Coaches' and Contestants' Choices			
Order	Contestant	Song	Josef	Michal	Dara & Marta	Majk
1	Adéla Michálková	"A Little Party Never Killed Nobody"	—			
2	Tomáš & Marek	"Medley"	—		—	
3	Lisa Bensonová	"Stay"	—	—	—	—
4	Viktor Holomek	"The Messenger"		—	—	—
5	Lenka Hrůzová	"Recovery"				
6	Peter Milkovič	"Take Me Home, Country Roads"	—	—	—	—
7	Andrea Janczarová	Listen	—		—	—
8	Robert Hlavatý	"You Can Leave Your Hat On"	—		—	
9	Barbora Drotárová	"I Follow Rivers"	—			—
10	Simona Gážiková	"Highway to Hell"				—

=== Episode 3: March 19, 2014 ===
Order	Contestant	Song	Coaches' and Contestants' Choices			
Order	Contestant	Song	Josef	Michal	Dara & Marta	Majk
1	Natália Hatalová	"At Last"	—			
2	Aneta Šrolerová	"Run to You"	—		—	
3	Martin Císar	"You Are So Beautiful"		—		—
4	Veronika Bergmanová	"Respect"	—	—	—	—
5	Simona Novotná	"Domino"		—	—	
6	Miroslav Mates	"Sweet Dreams"	—	—	—	—
7	Marek Relich	"Impossible"	—			
8	Veronika & Michal	"Radioactive"	—	—	—	—
9	Ondřej Nováček	"The A Team"	—		—	
10	Pavlína Ďuriačová	Hero	—		—	—
11	Sára Milfajtová	"Když nemůžu spát"			—	—
12	Petra Magdová	Listen				

=== Episode 4: March 26, 2014 ===
Order	Contestant	Song	Coaches' and Contestants' Choices			
Order	Contestant	Song	Josef	Michal	Dara & Marta	Majk
1	Edita Třísková	"It's a Heartache"			—	—
2	Vít Soural	"Get Lucky"	—		—	
3	Karin Kminiaková	"Man in the Mirror"	—	—	—	—
4	Ondřej Mašík	"Try"	—			—
5	Barbora Hořejší	"Toxic"	—			
6	Robin & Eliška	"The Time of My Life"	—	—	—	—
7	Kristína Mihaľová	"Summertime"	—			
8	Miriama Filkašová	"Make You Feel My Love"	—		—	
9	Michaela Zemánková	"Mercy"		—	—	—
10	Klára Kudláčová	You Lost Me	—		—	—
11	Lukáš Vilimovský	"Cesta"	—	—	—	—
12	Vendula Příhodová	Mercedes Benz				

=== Episode 5: April 2, 2014 ===
Order	Contestant	Song	Coaches' and Contestants' Choices			
Order	Contestant	Song	Josef	Michal	Dara & Marta	Majk
1	Patrik Malý	"Let Her Go"				
2	Tomi Furmaník	"Come Together"			—	
3	Anastasia Dunaeva	"Price Tag"	—	—	—	—
4	Jaroslav Klein	"Ještě že tě lásko mám"	—	—	—	—
5	Eva Kleinová	"If I Ain't Got You"			—	—
6	Lucie Bakešová	"Skyscraper"	—	—		
7	Petra Kepeňová	"Heaven"		—	—	—
8	Adam Urban	"Two Steps Behind"			—	—
9	Kateřina Šalátová	"Treasure"	—	—	—	—
10	Miroslava Zuntová	"Too Close"	—	—	—	
11	Diana Krišková	"Use Somebody"	—	—	—	—
12	Jakub Vaňas	"Best Of You"	—			—
13	Peter Karovič	"You Are So Beautiful"	—	—	—	—
14	Andrea Holá	"Under"	—			

=== Episode 6: April 9, 2014 ===
Order	Contestant	Song	Coaches' and Contestants' Choices			
Order	Contestant	Song	Josef	Michal	Dara & Marta	Majk
1	Eliška Mrázová	"Set Fire to the Rain"				
2	Richard Gajlík	"Nie sme zlí"			—	—
3	Nathalie Boszhard	"No One"	—	—	—	—
4	Anabela Mollová	"I Believe I Can Fly"	—	—		
5	Petr Urbánek	"Basket Case"	—	—	—	—
6	Tereza Hálová	"You Know I'm No Good"		—		
7	Alena Marjenková	"Read All About It, Pt. III"	N/A	—	—	—
8	Veronika Bílková	"People Help the People"	—	—	—	
9	Olga Džuban	"Burn"	N/A	—	—	N/A
10	Jana Rybníčková	Nobody Knows	—			—
11	Martin Kujan	Where the Streets Have No Name	—		—	—

== The Battle rounds ==
Color key

Artist won the Battle and advances to the Knockouts
Artist lost the Battle but was stolen by another coach and advances to the Knockouts
Artist lost the Battle and was eliminated

Episode	Coach	Order	Winner	Song	Loser	'Steal' result			
Episode	Coach	Order	Winner	Song	Loser	Pepa	Michal	Dara & Marta	Majk
Episode 7	Dara & Marta	1	Eliška Mrázová	"Little Talks"	Jakub Nesnídal	✔	—	—	—
Episode 7	Michal David	2	Pavlína Ďuriačová	"Ain't No Other Man"	Klára Kudláčová	—	—	—	—
Episode 7	Majk Spirit	3	Kristína Mihaľová	"Valerie"	Miriama Filkašová	—	—	—	—
Episode 7	Pepa Vojtek	4	Viktor Holomek	"This Is War"	Adam Urban	—	✔	✔	✔
Episode 7	Dara & Marta	5	Lucie Bakešová	"Locked Out of Heaven"	Adéla Michálková	—	—	—	—
Episode 7	Majk Spirit	6	Veronika Strapková	"Diamonds"	Aneta Šrolerová	—	—	—	—
Episode 8	Dara & Marta	1	Jakub Vaňas	"Love Me Again"	Ondřej Mašík	—	—	—	—
Episode 8	Majk Spirit	2	Anabela Mollová	"Girl on Fire"	Veronika Bílková	—	—	—	—
Episode 8	Michal David	3	Patrik Malý	"Just Give Me a Reason"	Katarína Kamencová	—	—	—	✔
Episode 8	Pepa Vojtek	4	Simona Gážiková	"Tainted Love"	Petra Kepeňová	—	—	—	—
Episode 8	Dara & Marta	5	Barbora Drotárová	"Someone like You"	Natália Hatalová	—	—	—	—
Episode 8	Majk Spirit	6	Blanka & Martin	"Imagine"	Miroslava Zuntová	—	✔	—	—
Episode 9	Michal David	1	Vendula Příhodová	"Man! I Feel Like a Woman!"	Andrea Holá	—	—	✔	✔
Episode 9	Majk Spirit	2	Vít Soural	"Billionaire"	Ondřej Nováček	—	—	—	—
Episode 9	Pepa Vojtek	3	Michaela Zemánková	"Unconditionally"	Sára Milfajtová	—	—	—	—
Episode 9	Michal David	4	Zolo Lebo	"Senza una donna"	Robert Hlavatý	—	—	—	—
Episode 9	Pepa Vojtek	5	Tereza Hálová	"Next to Me"	Simona Novotná	—	—	—	—
Episode 9	Dara & Marta	6	Jana Rybníčková	"Imagine"	Martin Císar	—	✔	—	✔
Episode 10	Michal David	1	Martin Kujan	"When You're Gone"	Petra Magdová	—	—	—	—
Episode 10	Pepa Vojtek	2	Edita Třísková	"Run Baby Run"	Zuzana Kamencová	—	✔	—	—
Episode 10	Dara & Marta	3	Marek Relich	"Broken Strings"	Barbora Hořejší	—	—	—	—
Episode 10	Pepa Vojtek	4	Tomi Furmaník	"Dakota"	Richard Gajlík	—	—	—	—
Episode 10	Michal David	5	Andrea Janczarová	"There You'll Be"	Eva Kleinová	—	—	—	—
Episode 10	Majk Spirit	6	Tomáš & Marek	"Numb"	Lenka Hrůzová	✔	—	—	—

== K.O. rounds ==
Color key

Artist won the K.O. and advances to the Live shows
Artist lost the K.O. and was eliminated

=== Episode 11 ===
Order	Coach	Contestant	Song	Contestant	Song
1	Pepa Vojtek	Viktor Holomek	"Rolling In The Deep"	Jakub Nesnídal	"Rock Around The Clock"
2	Michal David	Vendula Příhodová	"Bound to You"	Mirka Zuntová	"Summertime Sadness"
3	Dara & Marta	Marek Relich	"Wrecking Ball"	Barbora Drotárová	"I'm Like A Bird"
4	Majk Spirit	Veronika Strapková	"It's a Man's Man's Man's World"	Katarína Kamencová	"Wake Me Up"
5	Michal David	Andrea Janczarová	"One Night Only"	Pavlína Ďuriačová	"The Best"
6	Pepa Vojtek	Simona Gážiková	"Sweet Child O'Mine"	Michaela Zemánková	"Funhouse"
7	Dara & Marta	Jana Rybníčková	"Skyfall"	Adam Urban	"Whiskey In The Jar"
8	Majk Spirit	Blanka & Martin	"Wake Up Everybody"	Tomáš & Marek	"Nobody's Perfect"

=== Episode 12 ===
Order	Coach	Contestant	Song	Contestant	Song
1	Dara & Marta	Eliška Mrázová	"Man Down"	Jakub Vaňas	"Treasure"
2	Majk Spirit	Martin Císar	"Recovery"	Anabela Mollová	"His Eye Is on the Sparrow"
3	Michal David	Zolo Lebo	"Somebody to Love"	Zuzana Kamencová	"Nobody's Wife"
4	Pepa Vojtek	Edita Třísková	"What's Up?"	Tereza Hálová	"Fly Away"
5	Dara & Marta	Andrea Holá	"Call It Stormy Monday"	Lucie Bakešová	"You Oughta Know"
6	Michal David	Martin Kujan	"Roxanne"	Patrik Malý	"Pompeii"
7	Majk Spirit	Kristína Mihaľová	"Crazy"	Vít Soural	"Can't Hold Us"
8	Pepa Vojtek	Lenka Hrůzová	"That Ole Devil Called Love"	Tomi Furmaník	"Dnes"

== Live shows ==
=== Episode 13 ===
Coach	Order	Artist	Song	Result
Pepa Vojtek	1	Simona Gážiková	"Bad Romance "	Public Safe
Pepa Vojtek	2	Viktor Homolek	"Titanium"	Safe by Coach
Pepa Vojtek	3	Edita Třísková	"Alone"	Eliminated
Pepa Vojtek	4	Lenka Hrůzová	"Open Your Eyes"	Public Safe
Michal David	5	Andrea Janczarová	"Beautiful"	Safe by coach
Michal David	6	Zolo Lebo	"How Am I Supposed to Live Without You"	Public Safe
Michal David	7	Martin Kujan	"It's Time"	Eliminated
Michal David	8	Vendula Příhodová	"Woman"	Public Safe
Dara & Marta	9	Eliška Mrázová	"Girls Just Want to Have Fun"	Public Safe
Dara & Marta	10	Andrea Holá	"I Wanna Dance with Somebody"	Public Safe
Dara & Marta	11	Marek Relich	"Mirrors"	Eliminated
Dara & Marta	12	Jana Rybníčková	"Firework"	Safe by coaches
Majk Spirit	13	Blanka & Martin	"Man In The Mirror"	Public Safe
Majk Spirit	14	Veronika Strapková	"Royals"	Eliminated
Majk Spirit	15	Kristína Miháľová	"Happy"	Safe by coach
Majk Spirit	16	Martin Císar	"All of Me"	Public Safe

=== Episode 14 ===
Coach	Order	Artist	Song	Result
Pepa Vojtek	1	Simona Gážiková	"Still Loving You"	Safe by Coach
Pepa Vojtek	2	Viktor Homolek	"Here Without You"	Eliminated
Pepa Vojtek	3	Lenka Hrůzová	"Časy se mění"	Public Safe
Michal David	4	Andrea Janczarová	"Bang Bang"	Eliminated
Michal David	5	Zolo Lebo	"Something Happened on the Way to Heaven"	Public Safe
Michal David	6	Vendula Příhodová	"Stronger"	Safe by Coach
Dara & Marta	7	Eliška Mrázová	"Let It Go"	Public Safe
Dara & Marta	8	Andrea Holá	"Hot Stuff"	Safe by coaches
Dara & Marta	9	Jana Rybníčková	"Paradise City"	Eliminated
Majk Spirit	10	Blanka & Martin	"Ain't No Mountain High Enough"	Safe by Coach
Majk Spirit	11	Kristína Miháľová	"It's Oh So Quiet"	Eliminated
Majk Spirit	12	Martin Císar	"The Way You Make Me Feel"	Public Safe

=== Episode 15 ===
Coach	Order	Artist	Song	Result
Pepa Vojtek	1	Simona Gážiková	"It's My Life"	Eliminated
Pepa Vojtek	2	Lenka Hrůzová	"I Feel You"	Safe
Pepa Vojtek	3	Simona, Lenka and Václav Noid Bárta	"Nezvládne"	N/A
Michal David	4	Zolo Lebo	"When I Was Your Man"	Eliminated
Michal David	5	Vendula Příhodová	"Brand New Me"	Safe
Michal David	6	Zolo, Vendula and Helena Vondráčková	"To tehdy padal déšť"	N/A
Dara & Marta	7	Eliška Mrázová	"Love The Way You Lie"	Eliminated
Dara & Marta	8	Andrea Holá	"Purple Rain"	Safe
Dara & Marta	9	Eliška, Andrea and Ewa Farna	"Toužím"	N/A
Majk Spirit	10	Blanka & Martin	"Don't You Worry About a Thing"	Eliminated
Majk Spirit	11	Martin Císar	"Hallelujah"	Safe
Majk Spirit	12	Blanka & Martin, Martin and Richard Müller	"Štěstí je krásná věc"	N/A

=== Episode 16 - Final ===
Coach	Order	Artist	Song	Result
Pepa Vojtek	1	Lenka Hrůzová	"GoldenEye"	Winner
Pepa Vojtek	1	Lenka Hrůzová	"Z nebe pláče déšť"	Winner
Pepa Vojtek	1	Lenka Hrůzová	"Jen jednou dostat šanci" w/Pepa	Winner
Michal David	2	Vendula Příhodová	"Black Velvet"	Runner-up
Michal David	2	Vendula Příhodová	"Jednoho dne se vrátíš"	Runner-up
Michal David	2	Vendula Příhodová	"Up Where We Belong" w/Michal	Runner-up
Dara & Marta	3	Andrea Holá	"Rise Like a Phoenix"	4th
Dara & Marta	3	Andrea Holá	"Boty proti lásce"	4th
Dara & Marta	3	Andrea Holá	"I Feel Good" w/Dara & Marta	4th
Majk Spirit	4	Martin Císar	"The Power of Love"	3rd
Majk Spirit	4	Martin Císar	"Boli sme raz milovaní"	3rd
Majk Spirit	4	Martin Císar	"I Was Wrong" w/Majk	3rd

== Results summary of live shows ==
=== Overall ===
Color key:

Artist's info

- Artist from Team Josef
- Artist from Team Dara & Marta
- Artist from Team Majk
- Artist from Team Michal

Live show results per week
Artist	Week 1	Week 2	Week 3	Final
Lenka Hrůzová	Public Safe	Public Safe	Public Safe	Winner
Vendula Příhodová	Public Safe	Safe	Public Safe	Runner-up
Martin Císar	Public Safe	Public Safe	Public Safe	Third place
Andrea Holá	Public Safe	Safe	Public Safe	4th place
Simona Gážiková	Public Safe	Safe	Eliminated	Eliminated (Week 3)
Eliška Mrázová	Public Safe	Public Safe	Eliminated	Eliminated (Week 3)
Blanka & Martin	Public Safe	Safe	Eliminated	Eliminated (Week 3)
Zolo Lebo	Public Safe	Public Safe	Eliminated	Eliminated (Week 3)
Viktor Holomen	Safe	Eliminated	Eliminated (Week 2)	
Jana Rybníčková	Safe	Eliminated	Eliminated (Week 2)	
Kristína Miháľová	Safe	Eliminated	Eliminated (Week 2)	
Andrea Janczarová	Safe	Eliminated	Eliminated (Week 2)	
Edita Třísková	Eliminated	Eliminated (Week 1)		
Marek Relich	Eliminated	Eliminated (Week 1)		
Veronika Strapková	Eliminated	Eliminated (Week 1)		
Martin Kujan	Eliminated	Eliminated (Week 1)		

== See also ==
- The Voice (TV series)
