= Dance Extravaganza =

Czech radio programme

Dance Extravaganza was a highly influential radio programme broadcast by Czech radio station Evropa 2 from 1997 to 2006. The show was focused on electronic and dance music. It significantly contributed to the popularity of electronic music in the Czech Republic.

== Conception ==
Dance Extravaganza was broadcast every Saturday and was hosted by Marek Řeřicha who provided spoken word, created track lists, played his own sets and also interviewed many guests both directly in the studio or over the phone. Live sets created directly in the studio became and indispensable part of the show. The live guests included many respected djs such as Michael Burian, Dj Lucca, Dj Ladida, Tomáš Haverlík, etc. It was also the only radio show in the Czech Republic at that time that contained sets by internationally known djs and music groups. These included Carl Cox, Tom Middleton, DJ Stranger, Groove Armada, Armin van Buuren, Eric Morillo, The Chemical Brothers, Eric Prydz, etc.

== History ==
The show was launched on 5 July 1997. The initial episodes offered dance music which could be described as commercial but it has later developed into more sophisticated programme that offered also some less-known styles such as progressive house and helped to popularise them. On its peak, Dance Extravaganza brought live broadcasts from large events Summer of Love 2005 and Paul van Dyk's gig in Prague. The show won the Czech Dance Award for the best radio show multiple times. Despite the huge popularity of the show, Evropa 2 has decided to cancel it after 9 years due to unspecified problems with Řeřicha. The last episode was broadcast on 24 June 2006. During the years, Dance Extravaganza has gained a cult following. After withdrawing the original show and a short gap, Evropa 2 has introduced similar programme called Dance Exxtravaganza. The original broadcasting schedule has changed and the host was replaced by a group of resident DJs who prepare the programme beforehand.

== Supporters` initiative ==
As Dance Exxtravaganza's departure from the original scheme disappointed some fans, they created a non-commercial website which allows them to share their personal recordings of the show from the years 1997 - 2006. Its goal is to gather as many recordings of Dance Extravaganza that cover the entire life-span of the show because it had not been made accessible by the radio station.
