= Hlas Česko Slovenska 2012 =

- Season 2012
- Hosted by: Leoš Mareš; Tina
- Judges: Josef Vojtek; Rytmus; Dara Rolins; Michal David
- Winner: Ivanna Bagová
- Runner-up: Anna Veselovská

Release
- Original network: TV Markíza; TV Nova
- Original release: February 12 – June 3, 2012

Season chronology
- Next → 2014

Hlas Česko Slovenska (Czech and Slovak for The Czech / Slovak Voice, literally The Voice of Czecho Slovakia) is a reality singing competition and version of The Voice of Holland for Czech Republic and Slovakia. It is part of the international syndication The Voice based on the reality singing competition launched in the Netherlands, created by Dutch television producer John de Mol. It kicked off on February 12, 2012, and ended on June 3, 2012. One of the important premises of the show is the quality of the singing talent. Four coaches, themselves popular performing artists, train the talents in their group and occasionally perform with them. Talents are selected in blind auditions, where the coaches cannot see, but only hear the auditioner.

== Overview ==
=== Coaches and Finalists ===
– Winning Coach/Contestant. Winners are in bold, eliminated contestants in small font.
– Runner-Up Coach/Contestant. Final contestant first listed.
– 2nd Runner-Up Coach/Contestant. Final contestant first listed.

Judges/Coaches
Josef Vojtek	Michal David	Dara Rolins	Rytmus
- Markéta Poulíčková; - Barbora Švidraňová; - Daniel Mrózek; - Kristína Zakuciová; - Jakub Pohle; - Veronika Vrublová	- **Ivanna Bagová**; - Brunno Oravec; - Kateřina Petráňová; - Petr Kutheil; - David Weingartner; - Alžbeta Pažoutová	- Miloš Novotný; - Dominika Šuľáková; - Zuzana Mikulcová; - Katarína Demská; - Simona Hégerová; - David Bísek	- Anna Veselovská; - Juraj Zaujec; - Nikoleta Spalasová; - Kristýna Daňhelová; - Adam Koubek; - Michal Chrenko

=== Format ===
The series consists of three phases: a blind audition, a battle phase, and live performance shows. Four judges/coaches, all noteworthy recording artists, choose teams of contestants through a blind audition process. Each judge has the length of the auditioner's performance (about one minute) to decide if he or she wants that singer on his or her team; if two or more judges want the same singer (as happens frequently), the singer has the final choice of coach. Each team of singers is mentored and developed by its respective coach. In the second stage, called the battle phase, coaches have two of their team members battle against each other directly by singing the same song together, with the coach choosing which team member to advance from each of four individual "battles" into the first live round. Within that first live round, the surviving acts from each team again compete head-to-head, with a combination of public and jury vote deciding who advances onto the next round. In the final phase, the remaining contestants (top 8) compete against each other in live broadcasts. The television audience and the coaches have equal say 50/50 in deciding who moves on to the final 4 phase. With one team member remaining for each coach, the (final 4) contestants compete against each other in the finale with the outcome decided solely by public vote.

The first season started on February 12, 2012, and is aired simultaneously in both countries. The judges are Josef Vojtek, leadsinger of Czech rock band Kabát, 1980s cult figure Michal David, pop singer Dara Rolins and her spouse, popular hip hop/R'n'B artist and sex symbol Rytmus.

=== The Blind Auditions ===
Key	Coach hit his or her "I WANT YOU" button	Contestant eliminated with no coach pressing his or her "I WANT YOU" button	Contestant defaulted to this coach's team	Contestant elected to join this coach's team

==== Episode 1: February 12, 2012 ====
Order	Contestant	Song	Coaches' and Contestants' Choices			
Order	Contestant	Song	Josef	Michal	Dara	Rytmus
1	Daniel Mrózek	"Apologize"				
2	Kristýna Daňhelová	"Big Girls Don't Cry"	—		—	
3	Jakub Pohle	"Always"		—		—
4	Vanda Krajčovicová	"Touch the Sun"	—	—	—	—
5	Adam Pavlovčin	"Love's Divine"	—			
6	Viliam Šandor	"On My Head"	—	—	—	—
7	Simona Hégerová	"Mama Do (Uh Oh, Uh Oh)"				—
8	Arpád Csete	"Mad World"	—		—	
9	Petr Lexa	"Forget You"				
10	Markéta Walsbergerová	"Hello"	—	—	—	—
11	Bára Vaculíková	"Poison"		—	—	—
12	Alan Tuscany	"Whataya Want from Me"	—	—		—
13	Tino Richter	"I'm Yours"	—	—	—	—
14	Lucia Molnárová	"Vyznanie"				

==== Episode 2: February 19, 2012 ====
Order	Contestant	Song	Coaches' and Contestants' Choices			
Order	Contestant	Song	Josef	Michal	Dara	Rytmus
1	Zuzana Mikulcová	"You Give Me Something"	—	—		
2	Viktor Nižník	"Bad Day"	—	—	—	—
3	Markéta Poulíčková	"Sober"				
4	Michal Kašpar	"Easy"			—	
5	František Bartoš	"Vyznání"	—	—	—	—
6	David Bísek	"California King Bed"	—	—		
7	Nikoleta Spalasová	"Nothing Compares To You"	—		—	
8	Imrich Tengeri	"Sex On Fire"	—	—	—	
9	Vladimíra Bauerová	"Vyznanie"	—	—	—	—
10	Nándor Polgáry	"Come Together"	—	—		
11	Radka Križanová	"Rome Wasn't Built In A Day"			—	—
12	Karolína Ruppert	"Pokoj v duši"	—	—	—	—
13	Marek Motalík	"Wonderwall"		—		
14	Veronika Vrublová	"Poison"		—	—	—
15	Ivanna Bagová	"If I Were A Boy"				
16	Karel Gott*	"That's Life (Czech version)"				

- This was a guest appearance by the famous singer who was playing a trick on the coaches finding out if they would recognise him. While every coach pushed the button immediately, he did not choose any of them as he was not really auditioning for the show.

==== Episode 3: February 26, 2012 ====
Order	Contestant	Song	Coaches' and Contestants' Choices			
Order	Contestant	Song	Josef	Michal	Dara	Rytmus
1	Adam Koubek	"Easy"		—	—	
2	Veronika Vohnoutová	"Bad Day"	—	—	—	—
3	Katarína Demská	"Billie Jean"	—	—		—
4	Michaela Husárová	Back to Black	—			—
5	Jiří Koběrský	"Love Is All Around"	—		—	—
6	Robert Julius A.	"Plush"	—	—	—	—
7	Norbert Petický	"Hero"	—	—		
8	Lenka Libjaková	"Time After Time"	—	—	—	
9	Eva Bittová	"Because of You"	—	—		
10	Kateřina Petráňová	"Sweet About Me"	—			
11	Magdalena Wronková	"Poison"	—	—	—	—
12	Jan Rychta	"All By Myself"	—	—	—	—
13	Dominika Šuľáková	"Sober"		—		—
14	Tomáš & Peter Szabó	"Fuckin' Perfect"	—	—	—	—
15	Lucie Dobrovodská	"Purple Rain"	—	—		
16	Hana Hyánková	"One of Us"	—	—	—	—
17	Barbora Švidraňová	"Warwick Avenue"		—	—	
18	Martina Fabová	"I Say a Little Prayer"	—	—	—	—
19	Jaromír Hnilica	"Set Fire to the Rain"				

==== Episode 4: March 4, 2012 ====
Order	Contestant	Song	Coaches' and Contestants' Choices			
Order	Contestant	Song	Josef	Michal	Dara	Rytmus
1	Matej Koreň	"Let Me Entertain You"		—	—	—
2	Elin Špidlová	"I Try"	—	—		
3	Martin Hrabal (Wildcard from idnes.cz)	"Easy"			—	
4	Natália Puklušová	"Fuckin' Perfect"	—	—	—	—
5	Judita Hansman	"Love Is A Losing Game"	—	—		—
6	Martin Truhlář	"Just The Way You Are"		—	—	—
7	Michal Dukes	"Beat It"	—	—	—	—
8	Anna Veselovská	"Feeling Good"				
9	Libor Zajpt	"Sex On Fire"		—	—	—
10	Elén Berešová	"Bleeding Love"	—	—	—	—
11	Ester Weisnerová	"Don't Know Why"	—		—	—
12	Juraj Zaujec	"Message in a Bottle"			—	
13	Jan Danda	"Against All Odds"			—	
14	Renáta Podlipská	"Spomaľ"	—	—	—	—
15	Tamara Kubová (Wildcard from Deníka)	"If I Ain't Got You"	—	—	—	
16	Brunno Oravec	"Ordinary World"				—
17	Hana Balcarová	"Bubbly"	—	—	—	—
18	Petr Kutheil	"Whataya Want From Me"				

==== Episode 5: March 11, 2012 ====
Order	Contestant	Song	Coaches' and Contestants' Choices			
Order	Contestant	Song	Josef	Michal	Dara	Rytmus
1	Renáta Čonková	"Because Of You"	—	—		
2	David Weingartner	"Losing My Religion"	—		—	—
3	Brigita Čikošová Szelidová	"Beautiful"	—	—	—	—
4	Lenka Jankovská	"Waiting on the World to Change"				
5	Martin Máček	"With Or Without You"	—	—	—	—
6	Kristína Zakuciová	"One of Us"		—	—	—
7	Patrik Havelka	"Spomaľ"	—	—	—	
8	Jan Vytásek	"Every Breath You Take"	—	—	—	—
9	Barbora Blahová	"Empire State of Mind"		—	—	
10	Ekaterini Sluková	"Love Is A Losing Game"	—	—	—	—
11	Michal Chrenko	"Easy"	—	—	—	
12	Vojtěch Drahokoupil	"Bad Day"	—	—	—	—
13	Simona Fehérová	"Mercy"	—			
14	Peter Debnár	"In My Place"	—	—	—	—
15	Miloš Novotný	"On My Head"	—	—		—
16	Alžběta Pažoutová	"California King Bed"	—		—	—

=== The Battles ===
Coaches begin narrowing down the playing field by training the contestants with the help of "trusted advisors". Each episode featured eight to ten battles consisting two of pairings from within each team, and each battle concluding with the respective coach eliminating one of the two contestants. After that the seven winners had to go through one sing-off before six of them advanced to the live shows.

Josef	Michal	Dara	Rytmus
Linda Finková	Václav Patejdl	Tonya Graves	Tomi Popovič

– Battle Winner

==== Episode 6: 18 March 2012 ====
Order	Coach	Contestant	Contestant	Song
1	Josef	Barbára Vaculíková	Markéta Poulíčková	"Fighter"
2	Dara	Adam Pavlovčin	Miloš Novotný	"Without You"
3	Rytmus	Adam Koubek	Patrik Havelka	"Hey Jude"
4	Michal	Alžbeta Pažoutová	Ester Wiesnerová	"Life"
5	Josef	Jakub Pohle	Libor Zajpt	"Sweet Child o' Mine"
6	Dara	Alan Tuskany	Dominika Šuľáková	"Kids"
7	Rytmus	Imrich Tengeri	Juraj Zaujec	"(I Can't Get No) Satisfaction"
8	Michal	Kateřina Petráňová	Radka Križanová	"California King Bed"
9	Michal	Martin Hrabal	Petr Kutheil	"Radio Ga Ga"
10	Rytmus	Anna Veselovská	Lucie Dobrovodská	"Set Fire to the Rain"

==== Episode 7: 25 March 2012 ====
Order	Coach	Contestant	Contestant	Song
1	Michal	Ivanna Bagová	Jaromír Hnilica	"Dangerous"
2	Josef	Jan Danda	Martin Truhlář	"Say say say"
3	Dara	Lenka Jankovská	Elin Špidlová	"Run to You"
4	Rytmus	Petr Lexa	Tamara Kubová	"Moves Like Jagger"
5	Josef	Barbora Blahová	Kristína Zakuciová	"Love the Way You Lie"
6	Dara	David Bisek	Norbert Petick	"Cry Me a River"
7	Rytmus	Kristýna Daňhelová	Renáta Čonková	"Firework"
8	Michal	David Weingartner	Jiří Koběrský	"The Riddle"
9	Josef	Barbora Švidraňová	Matej Koreň	"One"
10	Dara	Judita Hansman	Zuzana Mikulcová	"Ain't No Mountain High Enough"
11	Rytmus	Simona Fehérová	Michal Chrenko	"Crazy"

==== Episode 8: 1 April 2012 ====
Order	Coach	Contestant	Contestant	Song
1	Josef	Marek Motalík	Daniel Mrózek	"I Want It That Way"
2	Rytmus	Nikoleta Spalasová	Lenka Libjaková	"Lady Marmalade"
3	Dara	Eva Bittová	Simona Hégerová	"I Hate This Part"
4	Michal	Michal Kašpar	Lucia Molnárová	"Higher"
5	Josef	Michaela Husárová	Veronika Vrublová	"Valerie"
6	Dara	Nandy Polgáry	Katarína Demská	"Falling Slowly"
7	Michal	Arpád Csete	Brunno Oravec	"You"

==== The Sing-off ====
Each coach nominates 5 acts from their group to advance to the live shows. The 2 remaining acts per group will do a sing-off for the remaining live show spot.

Sing Off #	Coach	Contestant	Song	Contestant	Song
1	Rytmus	Kristýna Daňhelová	"Big Girls Don't Cry"	Petr Lexa	"Forget You"
2	Josef	Martin Truhlář	"Just The Way You Are"	Jakub Pohle	"Always"
3	Dara	David Bisek	"California King Bed"	Lenka Jankovská	"Waiting on the World to Change"
4	Michal	Michal Kašpar	"Easy"	Petr Kutheil	"Whataya Want From Me"

=== The Live Shows ===
==== Episodes 9 & 10: April 8 and April 9, 2012 ====
Team Josef and Team Rytmus performed. Public voted and selected their top 2 in each team. These 2 contestants are safe and advancing to the next round. Then the coaches saved another 2 contestants and the remaining ones had to sing again for their place in the competition. They sang the same songs as they did the night before. One of them was saved by the coach and the other had to leave the competition.

- Team: Team Josef, Team Rytmus

Competition Performances

Performance Order	Coach	Contestant	Song	Result
1	Josef Vojtek	Markéta Poulíčková	"Left Outside Alone"	Josef's Vote
2	Josef Vojtek	Jakub Pohle	"Born to Be Wild"	Josef's Vote
3	Josef Vojtek	Kristína Zakuciová	"Bad Romance"	Sing-Off
4	Josef Vojtek	Daniel Mrózek	"Angels"	**Public Vote**
5	Josef Vojtek	Veronika Vrublová	"It's My Life"	Eliminated
6	Josef Vojtek	Barbora Švidraňová	"Rolling in the Deep"	Public Vote
7	Rytmus	Kristýna Daňhelová	"Stronger (What Doesn't Kill You)"	Sing-Off
8	Rytmus	Nikoeta Spalasová	"Halo"	Public Vote
9	Rytmus	Adam Koubek	"Kiss from a Rose"	Rytmus' Vote
10	Rytmus	Juraj Zaujec	"Držím ti miesto" by TEAM	Rytmus' Vote
11	Rytmus	Michal Chrenko	"I Need a Dollar"	Eliminated
12	Rytmus	Anna Veselovská	"Jar of Hearts"	Public Vote

==== Episodes 11 & 12: April 15 and April 16, 2012 ====
Team Dara and Team Michal performed. Public voted and selected their top 2 in each team. These 2 contestants are safe and advancing to the next round. Then the coaches saved another 2 contestants and the remaining ones had to sing again for their place in the competition. They sang the same songs as they did the night before. One of them was saved by the coach and the other had to leave the competition.

- Team: Team Dara, Team Michal

Competition Performances

Performance Order	Coach	Contestant	Song	Result
1	Dara Rolins	Dominika Šuľaková	"Grenade"	**Public Vote**
2	Dara Rolins	Katarína Demská	"Freedom"	**Sing-Off**
3	Dara Rolins	David Bisek	"Closer"	Eliminated
4	Dara Rolins	Zuzana Mikulcová	"No One"	**Public Vote**
5	Dara Rolins	Simona Hégerová	"We Found Love"	Dara's Vote
6	Dara Rolins	Miloš Novotný	"This Love"	Dara's Vote
7	Michal David	Petr Kutheil	"Lady Carneval"	Michal's Vote
8	Michal David	Kateřina Petráňová	"I Will Survive"	Michal's Vote
9	Michal David	Brunno Oravec	"Please Forgive Me"	**Sing-Off**
10	Michal David	Alžběta Pažoutová	"Who Knew"	**Eliminated**
11	Michal David	David Weingartner	"Personal Jesus"	Public Vote
12	Michal David	Ivanna Bagová	"I Will Always Love You"	Public Vote

==== Episodes 13 & 14: April 22 and April 23, 2012 ====
Team Josef and Team Rytmus performed. Public voted and selected their top 2 in each team. These 2 contestants are safe and advancing to the next round. Then the coaches saved another 1 contestant and the remaining ones had to sing again for their place in the competition. They sang the other songs as they did the night before. One of them was saved by the coach and the other had to leave the competition.

- Team: Team Josef, Team Rytmus

Competition Performances

Performance Order	Coach	Contestant	Song	Result
1	Josef Vojtek	Markéta Poulíčková	"GoldenEye"	**Public Vote**
2	Josef Vojtek	Jakub Pohle	"Skúsime to cez vesmir"	**Sing-Off**
3	Josef Vojtek	Kristína Zakuciová	"Nobody's Wife"	Josef's Vote
4	Josef Vojtek	Daniel Mrózek	"Boulevard Of Broken Dreams"	**Public Vote**
5	Josef Vojtek	Barbora Švidraňová	"Sweet Dreams"	Sing-Off
6	Rytmus	Kristýna Daňhelová	"I Surrender"	Sing-Off
7	Rytmus	Nikoeta Spalasová	"You Oughta Know"	Public Vote
8	Rytmus	Adam Koubek	"Never Gonna Give You Up"	**Sing-Off**
9	Rytmus	Juraj Zaujec	"La Camisa Negra"	Rytmus' Vote
10	Rytmus	Anna Veselovská	"Slzy tvý mámy"	Public Vote

Sing-Off Performances

Performance Order	Coach	Contestant	Song	Result
1	Josef Vojtek	Jakub Pohle	"Poker Face"	**Eliminated**
2	Josef Vojtek	Barbora Švidraňová	"Mercy"	Josef's vote
3	Rytmus	Kristýna Daňhelová	"Umbrella"	Rytmus' vote
4	Rytmus	Adam Koubek	"Man in the Mirror"	**Eliminated**

==== Episodes 15 & 16: April 29 and April 30, 2012 ====
Team Dara and Team Michal performed. Public voted and selected their top 2 in each team. These 2 contestants are safe and advancing to the next round. Then the coaches saved another contestant and the remaining ones had to sing again for their place in the competition. They sang the other songs as they did the night before. One of them was saved by the coach and the other had to leave the competition.

- Team: Team Dara, Team Michal

Competition Performances

Performance Order	Coach	Contestant	Song	Result
1	Dara Rolins	Dominika Šuľaková	"I Kissed A Girl"	**Sing-Off**
2	Dara Rolins	Katarína Demská	"Môj bože"	**Public Vote**
3	Dara Rolins	Zuzana Mikulcová	"These Words"	**Public Vote**
4	Dara Rolins	Simona Hégerová	"Sk8er Boi"	Sing-Off
5	Dara Rolins	Miloš Novotný	"Numb"	Dara's Vote
6	Michal David	Petr Kutheil	"Nothing Else Matters"	Sing-Off
7	Michal David	Kateřina Petráňová	"Domino"	Michal's Vote
8	Michal David	Brunno Oravec	"Hard To Say I'm Sorry"	**Public Vote**
9	Michal David	David Weingartner	"Feel"	Sing-Off
10	Michal David	Ivanna Bagová	"Už nejsem volná"	Public Vote

Sing-Off Performance

Performance Order	Coach	Contestant	Song	Result
1	Dara Rolins	Dominika Šuľaková	"Ain't No Other Man"	Dara's Vote
2	Dara Rolins	Simona Hégerová	"You Know I'm No Good"	Eliminated
3	Michal David	Petr Kutheil	"Smells Like Teen Spirit"	Michal's Vote
4	Michal David	David Weingartner	"Every You, Every Me"	Eliminated

==== Episodes 17 & 18: May 6 and May 7, 2012 ====
Team Josef and Team Rytmus performed. Public voted and selected their top 2 in each team. These 2 contestants are safe and advancing to the next round. The remaining ones had to sing again for their place in the competition. They sang the other songs as they did the night before. One of them was saved by the coach and the other had to leave the competition.

- Team: Team Josef, Team Rytmus

Competition Performances

Performance Order	Coach	Contestant	Song	Result
1	Josef Vojtek	Markéta Poulíčková	"Beat It"	**Public Vote**
2	Josef Vojtek	Kristína Zakuciová	"Because The Night"	Sing-Off
3	Josef Vojtek	Daniel Mrózek	"Dani California"	**Sing-Off**
4	Josef Vojtek	Barbora Švidraňová	"Chlap z kríža"	Public Vote
5	Rytmus	Kristýna Daňhelová	"Most přes minulost"	Sing-Off
6	Rytmus	Nikoeta Spalasová	"The Show Must Go On"	Public Vote
7	Rytmus	Juraj Zaujec	"Smooth"	Sing-Off
8	Rytmus	Anna Veselovská	"With Or Without You"	Public Vote

Sing-Off Performances

Performance Order	Coach	Contestant	Song	Result
1	Josef Vojtek	Kristína Zakuciová	"Russian Roulette"	Eliminated
2	Josef Vojtek	Daniel Mrózek	"Apologize"	Josef's Vote
3	Rytmus	Kristýna Daňhelová	"Firework"	Eliminated
4	Rytmus	Juraj Zaujec	"Ayo Technology"	Rytmus' Vote

==== Episodes 19 & 20: May 13 and May 14, 2012 ====
Team Dara and Team Michal performed. Public voted and selected their top 2 in each team. These 2 contestants are safe and advancing to the next round. The remaining ones had to sing again for their place in the competition. They sang another songs as they did the night before. One of them was saved by the coach and the other had to leave the competition.

- Team: Team Dara, Team Michal

Competition Performances

Performance Order	Coach	Contestant	Song	Result
1	Dara Rolins	Dominika Šuľaková	"Si sám"	**Public Vote**
2	Dara Rolins	Katarína Demská	"Imagine"	**Sing-Off**
3	Dara Rolins	Zuzana Mikulcová	"Beautiful"	**Public Vote**
4	Dara Rolins	Miloš Novotný	"Here I Go Again"	Sing-Off
5	Michal David	Petr Kutheil	"Země vzdálená"	Sing-Off
6	Michal David	Kateřina Petráňová	"V stínu kapradiny"	Sing-Off
7	Michal David	Brunno Oravec	"Voda, čo ma drží nad vodou"	**Public Vote**
8	Michal David	Ivanna Bagová	"Mamma Knows Best "	Public Vote

Sing-Off Performances

Performance Order	Coach	Contestant	Song	Result
1	Dara Rolins	Katarína Demská	"Billie Jean"	**Eliminated**
2	Dara Rolins	Miloš Novotný	"Shine"	Dara's Vote
3	Michal David	Petr Kutheil	"Whataya Want from Me"	Eliminated
4	Michal David	Kateřina Petráňová	" A Natural Woman"	Michal's Vote

==== Episode 21: May 21, 2012 ====
Every Team performed. Public voted and selected their top 1 in each team. These 1 contestant is safe and advancing to the semi-final round. The remaining ones had to sing again for their place in the competition. They sang the other songs as they did the night before. One of them was saved by the coach and the other had to leave the competition.

- Team: Team Josef, Team Rytmus, Team Dara, Team Michal

Competition Performances

Performance Order	Coach	Contestant	Song	Result
1	Josef Vojtek	Markéta Poulíčková	"Come Together"	**Public Vote**
2	Josef Vojtek	Daniel Mrózek	"Chci zas v tobě spát"	**Sing-Off**
3	Josef Vojtek	Barbora Švidraňová	"Make You Feel My Love"	Sing-Off
4	Rytmus	Nikoeta Spalasová	"Dirty Diana"	Sing-Off
5	Rytmus	Juraj Zaujec	"In The Air Tonight"	Sing-Off
6	Rytmus	Anna Veselovská	"The Story"	Public Vote
7	Dara Rolins	Dominika Šuľaková	"Bring Me To Life"	**Sing-Off**
8	Dara Rolins	Zuzana Mikulcová	"Crazy"	**Public Vote**
9	Dara Rolins	Miloš Novotný	"Hledá se žena"	Sing-Off
10	Michal David	Kateřina Petráňová	"I'm Every Woman"	Sing-Off
11	Michal David	Brunno Oravec	"Love Is A Wonderful Thing"	**Sing-Off**
12	Michal David	Ivanna Bagová	"Listen"	Public Vote

Sing-Off Performances

Performance Order	Coach	Contestant	Song	Result
1	Josef Vojtek	Daniel Mrózek	"Best of You"	**Eliminated**
2	Josef Vojtek	Barbora Švidraňová	"Warwick Avenue"	Josef's Vote
3	Rytmus	Nikoeta Spalasová	"If I Ain't Got You"	Eliminated
4	Rytmus	Juraj Zaujec	"Where Did You Sleep Last Night"	Rytmus' Vote
5	Dara Rolins	Dominika Šuľaková	"Sober"	**Eliminated**
6	Dara Rolins	Miloš Novotný	"Sweet Home Alabama"	Dara's Vote
7	Michal David	Kateřina Petráňová	"California King Bed"	Eliminated
8	Michal David	Brunno Oravec	"I Feel Good"	Michal's Vote

==== Episode 22 and 23: May 27 and May 28, 2012 ====
Every Team performed. Public and coaches voted and selected their top 1 in each team. These 1 contestant is safe and advancing to the final round. Other had to leave the competition.

- Team: Team Josef, Team Rytmus, Team Dara, Team Michal

Competition Performances

Performance Order	Coach	Contestant	Song	Result
1	Josef Vojtek	Markéta Poulíčková	"Black Cat"	**Safe**
2	Josef Vojtek	Barbora Švidraňová	"Marry the Night"	**Eliminated**
3	Rytmus	Juraj Zaujec	"Livin' La Vida Loca"	Eliminated
4	Rytmus	Anna Veselovská	"Wicked Game"	Safe
5	Dara Rolins	Zuzana Mikulcová	"Vision Of Love"	**Eliminated**
6	Dara Rolins	Miloš Novotný	"In The Shadows"	Safe
7	Michal David	Brunno Oravec	"Right Here Waiting"	**Eliminated**
8	Michal David	Ivanna Bagová	"My Heart Will Go On"	Safe

==== Episode 24: June 9, 2012 ====
Every Team performed. Public voted and selected their winner.

- Team: Team Josef, Team Rytmus, Team Dara, Team Michal

Competition Performances

Performance Order	Coach	Contestant	Song	Result
1	Josef Vojtek	Markéta Poulíčková	"Left Outside Alone"	3rd
1	Josef Vojtek	Markéta Poulíčková	"Jen jednou"	3rd
2	Rytmus	Anna Veselovská	"Jar of Hearts"	Runner-up
2	Rytmus	Anna Veselovská	"Na ceste"	Runner-up
3	Dara Rolins	Miloš Novotný	"Numb"	4th
3	Dara Rolins	Miloš Novotný	"Zachraň, co se dá"	4th
4	Michal David	Ivanna Bagová	"I Will Always Love You"	Winner
4	Michal David	Ivanna Bagová	"Pár minút"	Winner

== Results summary of live shows ==
=== Overall ===
Color key:

Artist's info

- Artist from Team Josef
- Artist from Team Dara
- Artist from Team Rytmus
- Artist from Team Michal

Live show results per week
Artist	Week 1	Week 2	Week 3	Week 4	Week 5	Finals
Ivanna Bagová	Public Safe	Public Safe	Public Safe	Public Safe	Safe	Winner
Anna Veselovská	Public Safe	Public Safe	Public Safe	Public Safe	Safe	Runner-up
Markéta Poulíčková	Safe	Public Safe	Public Safe	Public Safe	Safe	Third place
Miloš Novotný	Safe	Safe	Sing-Off	Sing-Off	Safe	4th place
Barbora Švidraňová	Public Safe	Sing-Off	Public Safe	Sing-Off	Eliminated	Eliminated (Week 5)
Juraj Zaujec	Safe	Safe	Sing-Off	Sing-Off	Eliminated	Eliminated (Week 5)
Zuzana Mikulcová	Public Safe	Public Safe	Public Safe	Public Safe	Eliminated	Eliminated (Week 5)
Brunno Oravec	Sing-Off	Public Safe	Public Safe	Sing-Off	Eliminated	Eliminated (Week 5)
Daniel Mrózek	Public Safe	Public Safe	Sing-Off	Eliminated	Eliminated (Week 4)	
Nikoleta Spalasová	Public Safe	Public Safe	Public Safe	Eliminated	Eliminated (Week 4)	
Dominika Šuľáková	Public Safe	Sing-Off	Public Safe	Eliminated	Eliminated (Week 4)	
Kateřina Petráňová	Safe	Safe	Sing-Off	Eliminated	Eliminated (Week 4)	
Kristína Zakuciová	Sing-Off	Safe	Eliminated	Eliminated (Week 3)		
Kristýna Daňhelová	Sing-Off	Sing-Off	Eliminated	Eliminated (Week 3)		
Katarína Demská	Sing-Off	Public Safe	Eliminated	Eliminated (Week 3)		
Petr Kutheil	Safe	Sing-Off	Eliminated	Eliminated (Week 3)		
Jakub Pohle	Safe	Eliminated	Eliminated (Week 2)			
Adam Koubek	Safe	Eliminated	Eliminated (Week 2)			
Simona Hégerová	Safe	Eliminated	Eliminated (Week 2)			
David Weingartner	Public Safe	Eliminated	Eliminated (Week 2)			
Veronika Vrublová	Eliminated	Eliminated (Week 1)				
Michal Chrenko	Eliminated	Eliminated (Week 1)				
David Bísek	Eliminated	Eliminated (Week 1)				
Alžběta Pažoutová	Eliminated	Eliminated (Week 1)				

== See also ==
- The Voice (TV series)
