= Céčka =

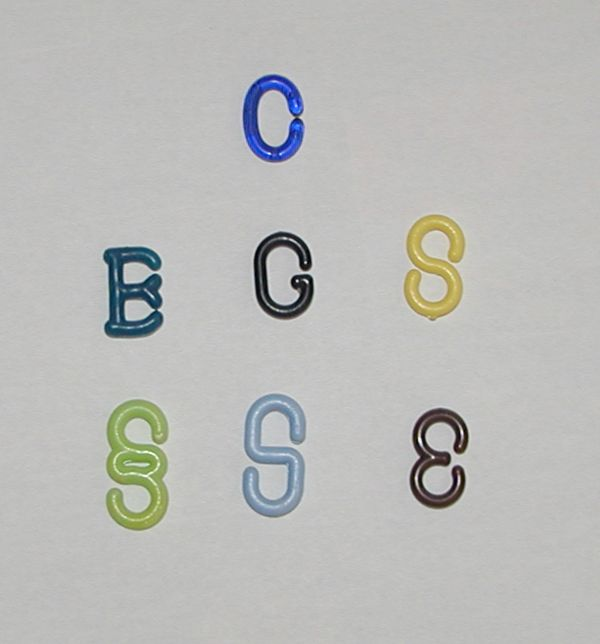
different shapes and colors of Céčka

Céčka ([t͡sɛːt͡ʃka]; English: C's; singular céčko) were plastic toys from Czechoslovakia popular in the 1980s and 90s, formerly used as parts of door hangings.

== History ==
The initial intention was to use Céčka as buckles for women's clothing, but it was a failure. The next attempt was to use them as parts of door hangings, but this did not succeed either. The real interest, which was born among the Czechoslovak children, set off Céčková horečka (Céčka fever). From 1984, Céčka became scarce materials of considerable value (for children) almost instantly. The basic shape is a letter C.

Plastic parts can be chained, and they were also used in several games, for instance, one similar in principle to pitching pennies. It also inspired Michal David's song Céčka, sbírá céčka (C's, she collects C's). Céčka are also mentioned twice in the song Pochodové cvičení by Czech singer and songwriter Slávek Janoušek.
