= Leoš Mareš =

Czech musician

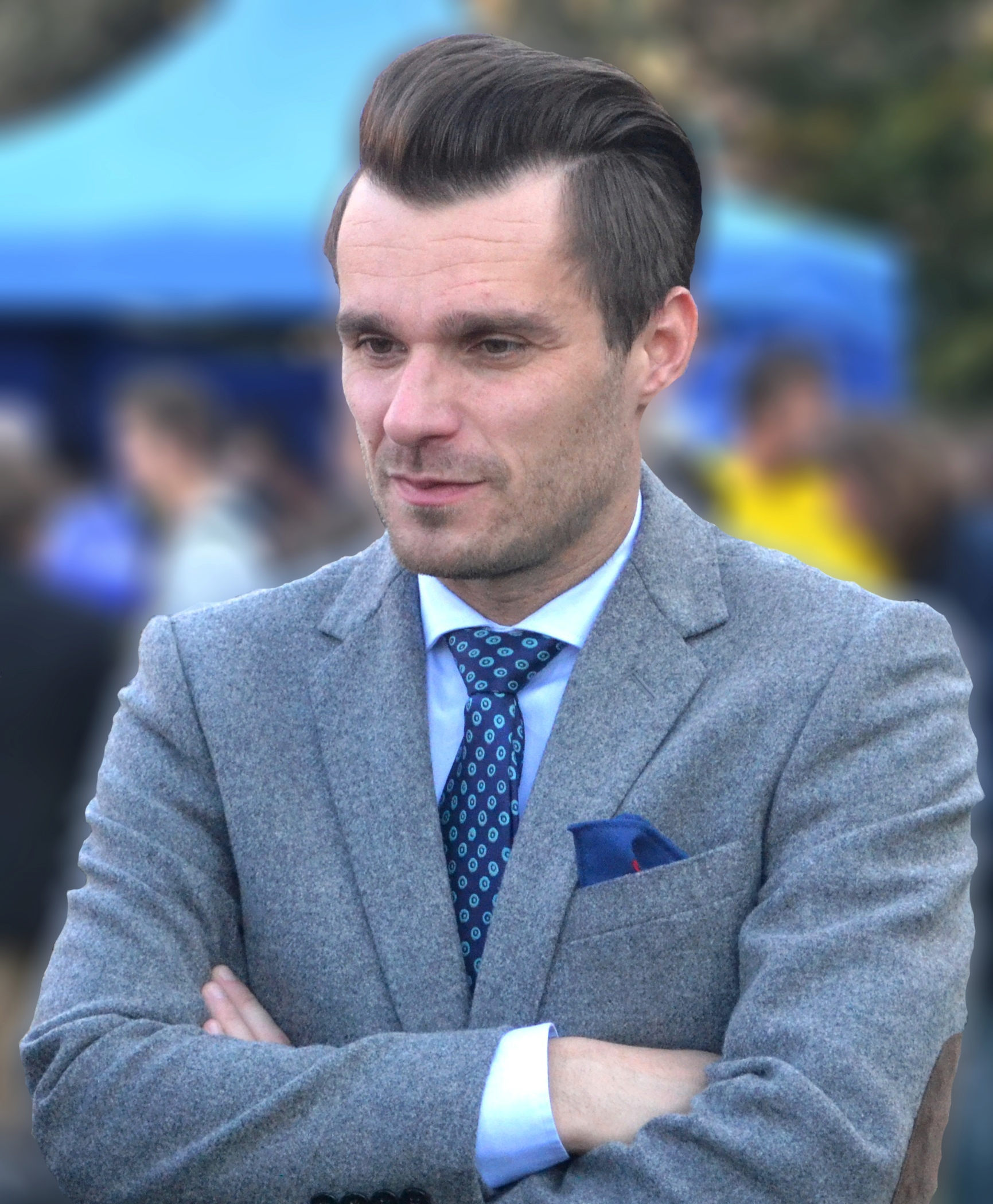

Background information
- Born: Leoš Mareš; 27 April 1976 (age 49)
- Origin: Beroun, Czechoslovakia
- Occupation: Moderator
- Years active: 2001–present
- Label: Universal
- Website: leosmares.cz

Leoš Mareš (born 27 April 1976) is a Czech television and radio presenter and singer. He has hosted a number of singer search television programmes, including Česko hledá SuperStar, X Factor and Hlas Česko Slovenska. He joined Česko Slovensko má talent as a judge in 2013. He is one of the highest-paid television presenters in the Czech Republic. A 2014 Forbes report listed Mareš as one of the 50 most influential people in Czech media.

== Early life ==
Mareš was born in the town of Beroun. He studied economics in the town of Cheb. He moved to Prague in 1997, joining national radio station Evropa 2. At Evropa 2 he presented programmes including the breakfast show and the Pepsi Top 20.

== Music career ==
Mareš released three albums between 2001 and 2003 via Universal Music Group.

== Television career and rising fame ==
Mareš moved into television in 2003; he was announced as the new host of TV Nova's music programme Eso, replacing Gabriela Partyšová. He continued in this position until Eso was discontinued in 2009. Later in 2003 Mareš hosted the Český slavík awards, describing the opportunity to do so as something which happens "once in a lifetime".

In 2012 Mareš and his morning show team from Evropa 2 – Patrik Hezucký and Lucie Šilhánová – were nominated for an award at the Czech Moderátor roku award. They won the award, which was announced at the end of October, ahead of presenters from rival stations including Frekvence 1 and Czech Radio.

Mareš served as the MC during Slavia Prague's 120th anniversary celebrations, held at Prague's National Theatre in 2013. He is a fan of Slavia Prague.

Mareš was named as one of the fifty most influential people in Czech media in the January 2014 Czech issue of Forbes magazine.

== Personal life ==
Mareš entered into a relationship with Monika Poslušná in 1998. Poslušná gave birth to their first son in November 2005. The couple married in July 2008. A second son was born to the couple in June 2009. He moved out of the family home in Prague's Smíchov district in 2010 and entered into a relationship with model Hana Svobodová, but wife Monika stated that divorce was "not on the agenda". Mareš's relationship with Svobodová, 13 years his junior, finished after 18 months in 2011.

== Discography ==
=== Studio albums ===
- 2001: Tři Slova
- 2002: Minuty Se Vlečou
- 2003: Nejlepší Nápad
