= Evropa 2 =

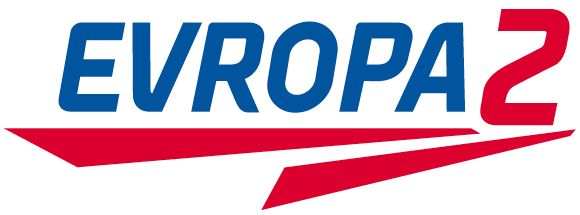
- Prague; Czech Republic
- Frequencies: 88.2 MHz (Prague); 105.5 MHz (Brno)

Programming
- Language: Czech

Ownership
- Owner: Czech Media Invest
- Sister stations: Europe 1, Europe 2, Europa 2

History
- First air date: 21 March 1990

Links
- Website: www.evropa2.cz

Evropa 2 is a Czech commercial radio station broadcasting a contemporary hit radio format. It began broadcasting in Prague on 21 March 1990, shortly after the Velvet Revolution, initially as the Czechoslovak version of the French station Europe 2.

The station is owned by Czech Media Invest, which acquired the Czech radio operations of Lagardère in 2018. Its broadcasting licence describes Evropa 2 as a contemporary hit radio station aimed at listeners aged 15 to 39.

In the first half of 2026, Evropa 2 was the second-most-listened-to radio station in the Czech Republic by average daily audience, with 673,000 listeners.

== History ==
The origins of Evropa 2 date to December 1989, shortly after the Velvet Revolution, when Martin Brisac, then managing director of the French radio network Europe 2, reached an agreement with Czechoslovak Radio to establish a youth-oriented music station. Evropa 2 began broadcasting in Prague on 21 March 1990 on 88.2 MHz, with Michel Fleischmann appointed to run the Czechoslovak operation. Under the initial arrangement, Czechoslovak Radio provided broadcasting facilities and distribution, while much of the programming was supplied from France.

In 1991, as Czechoslovakia opened radio broadcasting to private operators, Evropa 2 received an independent frequency in Prague and established its own studios. On 10 June 1991, it began broadcasting locally produced programming with Czech presenters and news, replacing the largely France-supplied service used during its first year.

During the 1990s, it expanded beyond Prague through a network of regional stations. By 1997, the network consisted of several regional affiliates carrying Evropa 2 programming for most of the broadcast day. Although Evropa 2 itself originally held a licence for Prague, its regional network had given it near-national coverage by the end of the decade.

The station's music format also evolved during the 1990s. After several changes, Evropa 2 switched from an adult contemporary format in January 1997 as it sought to appeal to a younger audience.

== Programming ==
Evropa 2 broadcasts a contemporary hit radio format focused primarily on current popular music, with presenter-led entertainment accompanied by news, weather and traffic information.

The station's principal programme is Ranní show (Morning Show), which first aired in September 1998. It became closely associated with presenters Leoš Mareš and Patrik Hezucký, who co-hosted the programme for more than two decades. Hezucký remained with the station until his death in December 2025. Ranní show continues to air on weekday mornings, presented by Mareš and Kateřina Říhová.
