= Sima (singer) =

Slovak singer (born 1996)

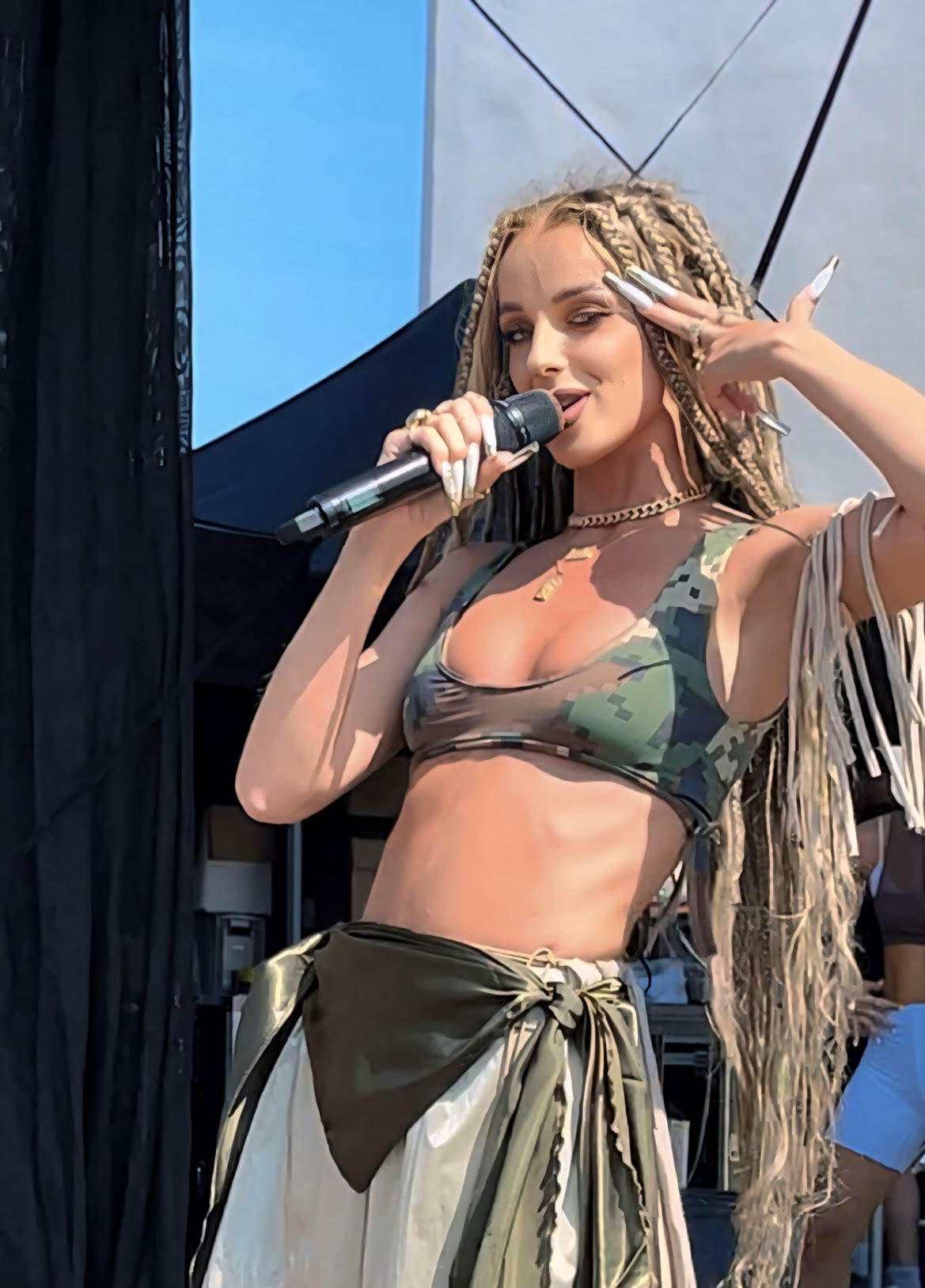
- Sima in 2024

Background information
- Born: Simona Hégerová; 30 April 1996 (age 29); Trnava, Slovakia
- Occupation: Singer
- Instrument: Vocals
- Years active: 2008–present
- Website: www.simonahegerova.sk

Simona Hégerová (born 30 April 1996, known professionally as Sima) is a Slovak pop and hip-hop singer. She is among the most popular Slovak internet personalities, with a high number of followers across multiple social media platforms.

== Biography ==
Simona Hégerová was born on 30 April 1996 in Trnava. She started singing at the age of nine. As a teenager, she participated in various television singing competitions. At 12, she, along with her sister Barbora, competed in the Mini Talent Show broadcast by Slovak Television and Radio. Four years later, at 16, she took part in Hlas Česko Slovenska 2012. At the age of 14, she was invited to perform at casting events of a modeling agency, which was later discovered to serve as a cover for human trafficking. Sima was among the key witnesses of the prosecution in the case against the owners of the agency.

In 2017, Sima started working with the rapper Ego, a member of the hip hop group Kontrafakt. This collaboration resulted in three successful albums - Femina (2017), Podľa Seba (2018) and Bombím (2019), which topped the sales charts in Slovakia. In 2022, she released her fourth album, Masterpiece, which topped the Spotify charts in Slovakia for most of the year. Due to her success on the platform, Sima was featured on a billboard in Times Square as part of Spotify's EQUAL campaign, highlighting influential female artists worldwide.

In 2024 Sima was included in the Slovak edition of Forbes magazine "30 under 30" list on the basis of her success across various online platforms.

== Musical style and influences ==
Her music is mainly pop, and she often raps or works with hip-hop artists. She first reached a wider audience through features with rapper Ego on the Podzemgang project, and her later singles kept this pop-rap mix. For example, “Toto leto” with rapper Kali was the most-viewed YouTube music video in Slovakia in 2020.

== Personal life ==
Since 2014, Sima has been in a relationship with the music producer Tomáš Gajlík.

== Discography ==
=== Studio albums ===
- Femina (2017) — Gajlo Records/Warner Music CZ.
- Podľa seba (2018) — Gajlo Records/Warner Music CZ; SK Albums peak #3.
- Bombím (2019) — Gajlo Records/Warner Music CZ; SK Albums peak #6.
- Masterpiece (2022) — Gajlo Records/Warner Music CZ; SK Albums peak #1.

=== Selected notable songs and collaborations ===
- “On je len kamarát” (2015) – Podzemgang feat. Ego & Sima.
- “Princíp vzájomnosti” (2017) – Sima feat. Ego.
