= Heidi Janků =

Czech singer and actress (born 1962)

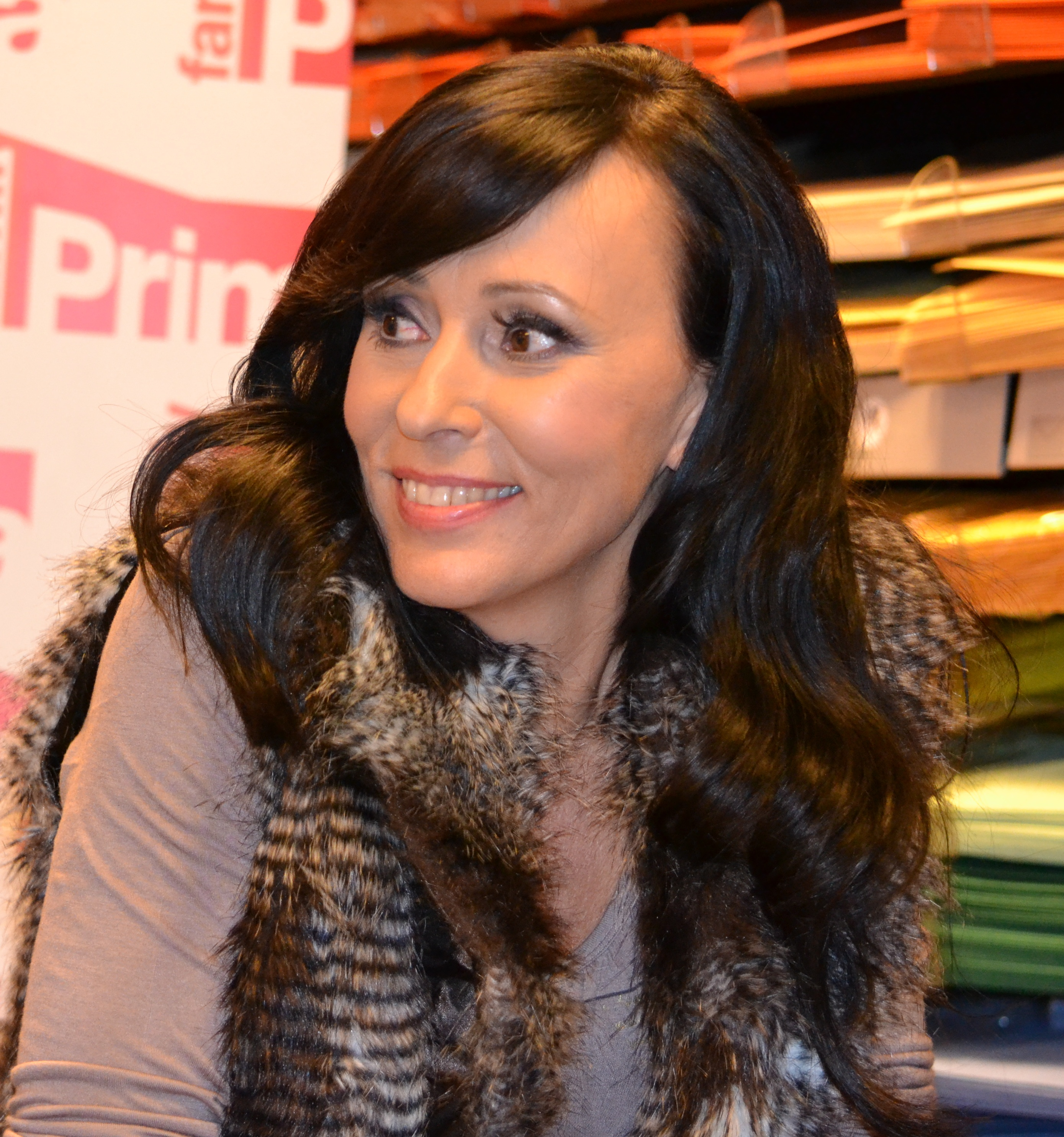
- Heidi Janků in 2013

Background information
- Born: Heidi Hantlová; 23 November 1962 (age 63)
- Origin: Ostrava, Czechoslovakia
- Occupation: Singer
- Years active: 1982–present
- Labels: Supraphon; Anes; Prolux; Aplaus; Popron; Ivox
- Website: heidi.cz

Heidi Janků (born 23 November 1962) is a Czech singer and actress. She released her first single, "Já jsem já" in 1982.

== Discography ==
=== Studio albums ===
- 1986: Heidi
- 1987: Úplně všechno
- 1987: Runnin' on
- 1990: Cesta kolem těla
- 1992: Heidi
- 1996: Ave Maria
- 2000: Zpověď
- 2002: Zlatej důl jsem přece já
- 2004: Buď a nebo
- 2006: Já jsem pořád já
