= Michal David =

Czech musician

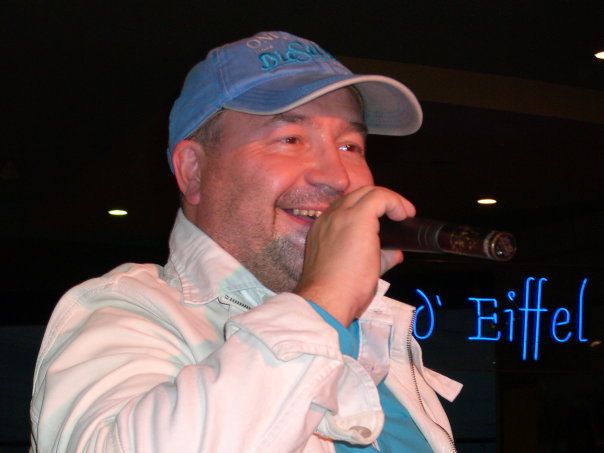
- Michal David at a concert in Brno

Background information
- Born: 14 July 1960 (age 65)
- Origin: Prague, Czechoslovakia
- Genres: Jazz, pop
- Occupations: Singer, songwriter, producer
- Instruments: Vocals, piano, electronic keyboard
- Years active: 1976–present
- Labels: Sony, Supraphon; Panton
- Website: michaldavid.cz

Michal David (born name Vladimír Štancl, 14 July 1960, Prague) is a Czech pop singer, songwriter and producer.

== Biography and career ==
He started his music career during his studies in Prague Conservatory in the 1970s where he created a jazz band with his friends, as jazz has been Michal's main passion and an academic concentration.

However, after a short period of time, he was hired by a successful pop-music producer František Janeček as a piano player, singer and a song-writer and soon became a teenage girls' idol.

Michal David had a very successful career as a singer and composer, however after the Czechoslovak Velvet Revolution in 1989, he as well many other Czechoslovak popular singers fell on hard times, since the political situation changed rapidly and the market started to open to other foreign artists and domestic artists lost their popularity for a while. He was also called a pro-regime singer by some critics. During this time Michal David was mainly focusing on composing and songwriting rather than performing.

His popularity was restored again in 1998 when he composed and sang "hymn" for the Czech national ice hockey team, which won the Nagano Winter Olympics that year.

Then, in 2000, he contributed to the comeback of another famous Czech female singer Helena Vondráčková by writing her a hit song "Dlouhá noc".

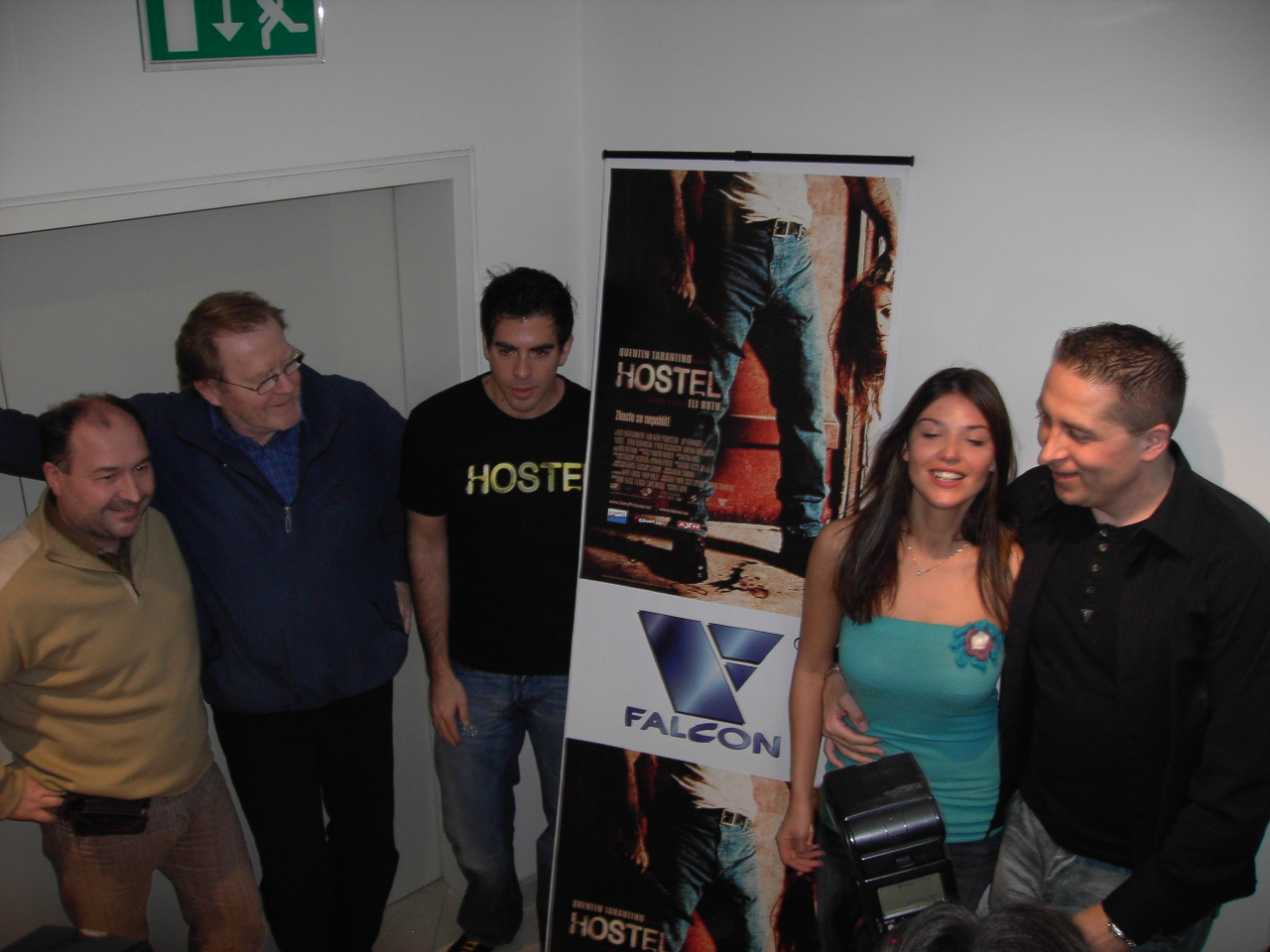
Michal David at the Hostel film premiere, first from left.

In 2002 Michal David officially composed his first musical show called "Kleopatra" which premiered in Prague theatre Broadway. Since then, Michal has composed more than 5 other musicals, where he was not only a songwriter but the producer as well. Kleopatra along with some of his other musical shows were sold to South Korea where they became instantly successful.

His song "Třetí Galaxie" appeared in Eli Roth's movie "Hostel".

Michal David was a vocal coach on the TV reality talent show The Voice, starting in February 2011 on Czech and Slovak National TV.

In June 2025, to celebrate his 45-year career, Michal David held two celebratory concerts at the O2 Arena in Prague, attracting over 20,000 spectators. The show direction and artistic production were handled by the Italian agency TBX Agency.

== Personal life ==
Michal David is currently living in Prague, Czech Republic with his wife Marcela (Marcela Skuherská), a former successful professional tennis player from the 1980s. (She won the Fed Cup in 1983 and 1984 with her team members Helena Suková, Hana Mandlíková and Iva Budařová, and participated in competitions such as US Open, Australian Open and Wimbledon). Michal's daughter Klára obtained her bachelor's degree in arts in New York City, followed by postgraduate studies at the University of Oxford.

David has been associated with many charities and non-profits since the death of his second daughter Michaela who died of leukemia at the age of 11.

== See also ==
- Céčka
