= Dara Rolins =

Slovak recording artist and entrepreneur

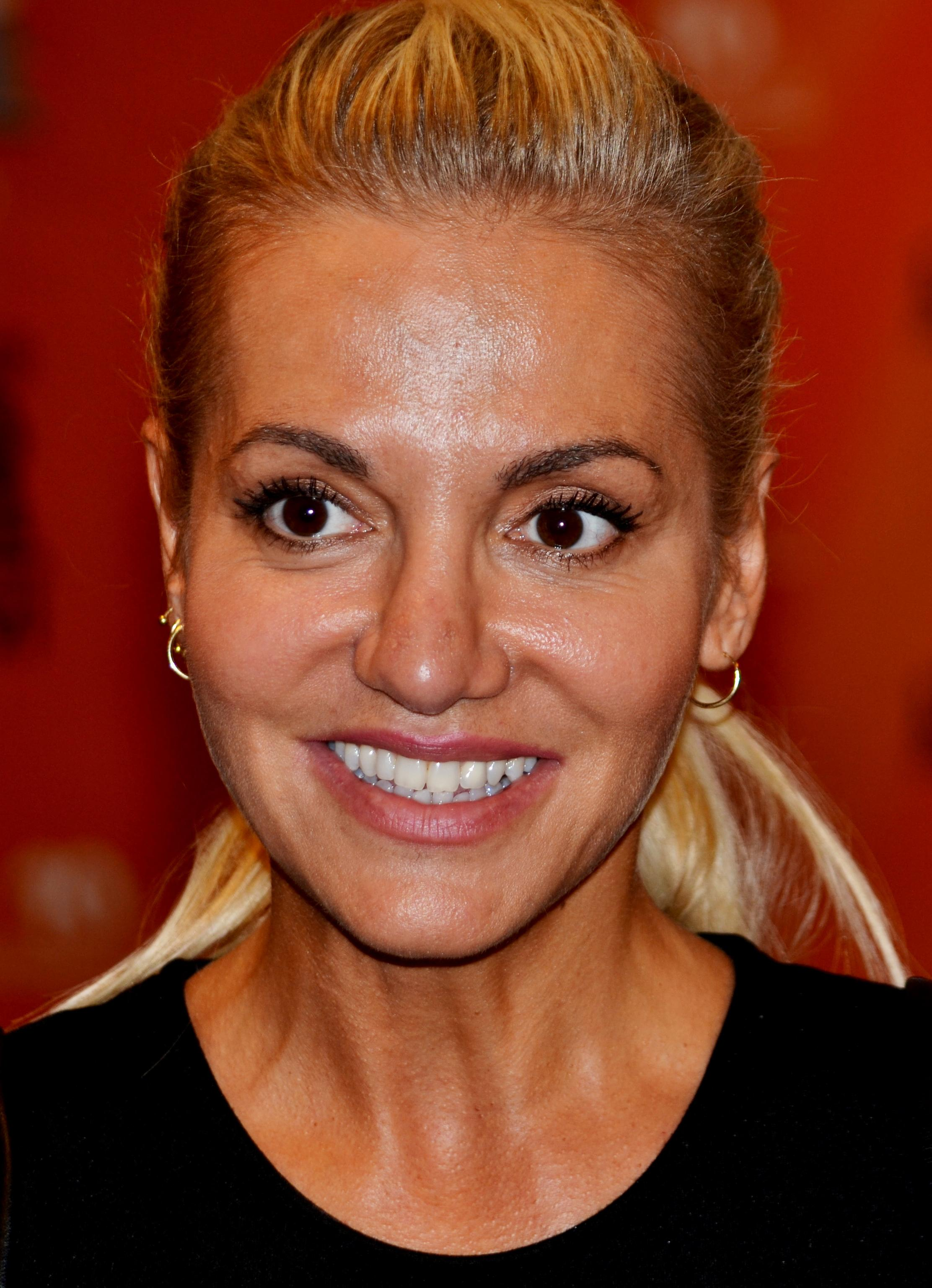
- At the launch ceremony of Vyčuraná máma book, September 2013
- Born: Darina Gombošová; 7 December 1972 (age 53); Bratislava, Czechoslovakia
- Occupations: Singer-songwriter; actress; entrepreneur7
- Years active: 1982–present
- Musical career
- Genres: Teen pop; synthpop; electronic dance; urban; soul
- Instrument: Vocals
- Labels: OPUS; Supraphon; Polydor; BMG; Epic; Bonton; Universal; EMI
- Website: dararolins.cz

Dara Rolins (born Darina Gombošová on 7 December 1972) is a Slovak recording artist and entrepreneur. Her music career began at the age of nine, after being cast in the television musical Zázračný autobus (1981). The early role established a formula for her regular assignments as a child singer, and resulted in recording her debut album Keby som bola princezná Arabela (1983) on OPUS Records. By her late teens, Rolins appeared in a number of made-for-TV films of varying quality, as well as releasing a series of teen pop-orientated albums, such as Darinka (1986), Čo o mne vieš (1988) and soundtrack Téměř růžový příběh (1990), all released by Supraphon. Along with Karel Gott, she experienced a one-off success in the German-speaking market in 1986, with their duet "Fang das Licht" ("Catch the Light") (the German version of their Czech duet "Zvonky štěstí") peaked at number seven on the Austrian Singles Chart, and number fifteen in Germany.

As she reached adulthood, her popularity stalled during the nineties. However, she made an attempt to replicate her local status abroad via the British album What You See Is What You Get (1996). The work distributed through a subsidiary of BMG, however, failed to attract the international market and she returned to homebase to resume her former course. Sen lásky (1997), which served as her initial comeback release featuring cover versions of various composers of classical era, produced a ZAI Awards-nomination within Slovak outputs. Following that, she continued in publishing dance material, namely What's My Name (2002) and D1 (2005); both on Epic. Her additional recordings included the best-of compilation 1983–1998 (2005) on Bonton, remix collection D2: Remixy (2008) by Epic and live recording of christmas album Šťastné a veselé (2009), released on Universal. On TV, she rebuilt her presence in 2007 for one season as a co-judge of reality show Slovensko hľadá SuperStar, and in the 2009 series of Česko Slovenská Superstar, also based on United Kingdom Pop Idol. She later joined the cast of Let's Dance (2011) and X Factor (2014).

Besides her recording achievements, Rolins posed topless in October 1999 for the Czech and Slovak issues of a men's magazine as a Playboy cover girl. She also upgraded her physical assets such as breasts prior to undergoing plastic surgery. The national press speculated about a rhinoplasty as well. In the new millennium, she has become the subject of more scrutiny. First, there was a 2009 revelation regarding her factual surname printed by Plus 7 dní; for over thirty years since her first public performance, she referred to herself exclusively under an adopted name. The following year, Rolins was accused of a negligent homicide caused by her 10 July 2010 traffic collision. The legal case, initially dropped due to a lack of probable cause, was later re-launched. In 2011, the pop singer released a new studio album on EMI entitled Stereo (2011). Receiving mixed reviews, the work featured an explicit, almost nude cover. Most recently, she released album ETC without a label.

== Biography ==
=== Early years ===
Dara Rolins, or Darina Rolincová, was born Darina Gambošová (Note: In 2009, Slovak Plus 7 dní disclosed information, upon which Rolins was lately identified to be born Darina Gambošová, instead of her initially provided maiden name Darina Rolincová. According to the Slovak civil registry, in 1980 her father Dušan Gamboš changed his name to Rolinec, the surname of his biological father. Because both of his parents had prematurely deceased, he was later adopted by a family named Gamboš. As stated for the magazine by the singer's grandmother from her paternal side, Božena Gambošová, Rolins' mother [Zlatica Rolincová] reportedly felt ashamed of her married name Gambošová (Gobish), so she urged her spouse to rename the whole family.) on 7 December 1972 in Bratislava, former Czechoslovakia. She is the younger daughter of Zlatica Rolincová (1945) and Dušan Gamboš (1948), parents of Slovak ancestry. She was raised with her half-sister Jana Labasová (1964), (Note: By 2009, Rolins' uterine sibling Jana was publicly recognized as her full sister named Jana Rolincová. As revealed by Plus 7 dní, she was actually her half-sister, originally born Jana Labasová as a result of having a different father. In the following years, she and/or the media used several variations of her name such as Jana Rolincová, Jana Hádlová, or formally Jana Rolincová-Hádlová.) better identified as Jana Hádlová-Rolincová per marriage with Czech record producer Daniel Hádl.
When she was four years old, Rolincová provisionally appeared in front of television cameras on the show Matelko, produced by STV. The regular program that starred a hand puppet named Drobček (Petit) was crafted for children. In 1978, encouraged by winning the talent contest Hledáme mladé talenty (Young Talents Wanted), she started to participate in local musical ensembles such as the Children's Choir of Czechoslovak Radio in Bratislava. Later on, she had piano lessons.

=== Car accident ===
On 8 October 2010 Rolins was officially accused by the Czech police of negligent manslaughter as the result of her traffic collision on Saturday 10 July 2010 in Prague. The singer, driving her Mercedes-Benz, had hit a motor scooter with a 63-year-old man named Jindřich Rotrekl, who died of his injuries three hours after he was escorted into hospital. She would deny all charges, however, and the case was dropped due to a lack of probable cause on 2 November 2010.

==== New prosecution ====
In August 2011, the prosecution against Rolins was re-launched following a new assessment, provided on behalf of the victim's family. According to the report, Rolins' vehicle had entered the opposite lane and hit the motorcyclist. On 19 September the singer was, therefore, re-interrogated by police officers, while facing up to six years in prison.

On 13 August 2012, the jury of the Prague Second District Court found Rolins guilty. She received a suspended sentence of two years and two months to three years probation. The singer also needed to reimburse about four million Czech crowns (approx. €160,224) in damages. In addition to court costs, the singer had to pay compensation to the family and all costs associated with the burial of the victim. She was also banned from operating a vehicle for three years. As of August 2012, the verdict, however, was not yet final and Rolins might appeal.

== Discography ==
Studio albums

Solo

- 1983: Keby som bola princezná Arabela
- 1986: Darinka
- 1988: Čo o mne vieš (alias You Hardly Know Me)
- 1996: What You See Is What You Get
- 1997: Sen lásky
- 2002: What's My Name
- 2006: D1
- 2011: Stereo
- 2017: ETC
- 2025: Znova a zas

Live Recordings

- 2009: Šťastné A Veselé
- 2021: Nablízko

With Others

- 1991: Snehulienka A 7 Pretekárov
- 1994: Thumbelina (Czech version)
- 1998: Sexy Dancers – Butcher's on the Road
- 2002: Wedding Band – Na Slovenskej Svadbe 1

== Filmography ==
Year	Title	Role	Director
Cinema
1984	Falošný princ	voice role only	Dušan Rapoš
1986	Není sirotek jako sirotek	voice role only	Stanislav Strnad
1987	Pehavý Max a strašidlá (Note B6)	voice role only	Juraj Jakubisko
1990	Takmer ružový príbeh	Darinka/Ruženka	Juraj Jakubisko
1994	Thumbelina: O Malence	voice role only	
2006	Sin City – město hříchu	voice role only	
2011	V peřině	Teacher	F. A. Brabec
Television
1982	Zázračný autobus	Janitor's daughter	Georgis Skalenakis
1982	Labula	Girl	Karol Spišák
1983	Monika a pes	Girl	Anton Majerčík
1983	Tam je hviezda Sírius (TV-series)	Ľubka	Cyril Králik
1984	Správne kroky	Schoolgirl	
1985	Cengá do triedy	Schoolgirl	
1986	Do-re-mi	Herself	Martin Hoffmeister
1987	Teta (TV series)	voice role only	Juraj Jakubisko
1988	Láska na inzerát		Eduard Sedlář
1991	Snehulienka a sedem pretekárov^{[A]}	voice role only	Libor Vaculík
2010	Dokonalý svět	Herself	Vít Karas
Documentaries
1988	Čo o mne vieš	Herself	
1999	František Tugendlieb: Všetko je v nás	Herself	Alena Čermáková
2004	Ženy pro měny	Herself	Erika Hníková
2008	Laci Strike: Cesta tanečníka	Herself	
Reality shows		Herself	
2007	Slovensko hľadá SuperStar (Season 3)	Judge	Various
2009	Česko Slovenská SuperStar season 1	Judge	Various
2011	Let's Dance (Season 5)	Judge	Various
2011	Modré z neba	Herself	Various
Talk shows
2003	Krásný ztráty	Herself	Tereza Kopáčová
2005	Uvolněte se, prosím	Herself	Vojtěch Nouzák
2009	Na streche	Herself	Peter Baláž
2011	AdelaShow	Herself	Various

Notes

- A Denotes a televised musical theatre.

== Bibliography ==
Year	Title	Publisher	Notes
2001	Afrodiziakální kuchařka: Láska prochází žaludkem	Duplex	Cookbook

== Copyrights ==
Year	Full Title	Copyright Number
1991	My dreaming	"PAu001563907".
1991	Keep all the money	"PAu001563933".
1993	Holiday, & 12 other songs	"PAu001747517".
2002	Stay	"PAu002786453".
2018	Have A Holiday	"PAu003906429".
2018	Hold You in My Arms	"PAu003909141".

== Awards ==
=== Major awards ===
Year	Nominated work	Award	Category	Result	Ref
1997	Sen lásky	ZAI Awards	Best Album	Nominated^{[B]}	
2006	Herself	Aurel Awards	Best Female Vocal Performance	Nominated^{[C]}	
2006	"Party DJ"	Aurel Awards	Best Music Video	Nominated^{[D]}	

Notes

- B Best Album category of 1997 was won by Svet lásku má, credited to various artists such as Pavol Habera, Peter Dvorský and Karel Gott. Other nominated works included Ultrapop by Hex, Štyry by Vidiek, Made II Mate's Carousel Life and the Klik-klak album by IMT Smile.
- C Aurel Awards allowed only three nominated artists per category. As a result of the equal number of votes received from academics, Rolins was nominated in 2006 for Best Female Vocal Performance with Barbara Haščáková. The other nominees were Tina and Katarína Knechtová. Tina eventually won the award.
- D Best Music Video category in 2006 went to "Miles" by Lavagance band, directed by Branislav Špaček.

=== Music polls ===
Zlatý slavík by Mladý svět, Czechoslovakia

Year	Nomination	Category	Result	Ref
1982	Herself	People's Choice: Female Singer	# 34	
1983	Herself	People's Choice: Female Singer	# 14	
1984	Herself	People's Choice: Female Singer	# 8	
1985	Herself	People's Choice: Female Singer	# 9	
1986	Herself	People's Choice: Female Singer	# 9	
1987	Herself	People's Choice: Female Singer	# 5	
1988	Herself	People's Choice: Female Singer	# 18	
1989	Herself	People's Choice: Female Singer	# 11	
1990	Herself	People's Choice: Female Singer	# 13	
1991	Herself	People's Choice: Female Singer	# 13	

Slávik by FORZA, Slovakia

Year	Nomination	Category	Result	Ref
1998	Herself	People's Choice: Female Singer	# 4	
1999	Herself	People's Choice: Female Singer	# 7	
2000	Herself	People's Choice: Female Singer	# 7	
2001	Herself	People's Choice: Female Singer	# 10	
2002	Herself	People's Choice: Female Singer	# 7	
2003	Herself	People's Choice: Female Singer	# 6	
2004	Herself	People's Choice: Female Singer	# 8	
2005	Herself	People's Choice: Female Singer	# 10	
2006	Herself	People's Choice: Female Singer	# 8	
2007	Herself	People's Choice: Female Singer	# 6	
2008	Herself	People's Choice: Female Singer	# 6	
2009	Herself	People's Choice: Female Singer	# 7	
2010	Herself	People's Choice: Female Singer	# 11	
2011	Herself	People's Choice: Female Singer	# 5	
2012	Herself	People's Choice: Female Singer	# 8	

Český slavík, Czech Republic

Year	Nomination	Category	Result	Ref
1997	Herself	People's Choice: Female Singer	# 22	
1998	Herself	People's Choice: Female Singer	# 27^{[E]}	
1999	Herself	People's Choice: Female Singer	# 27	
2000	Herself	People's Choice: Female Singer	# 27^{[F]}	
2001	Herself	People's Choice: Female Singer	# 27	
2002	Herself	People's Choice: Female Singer	# 23	
2003	Herself	People's Choice: Female Singer	# 34	
2004	Herself	People's Choice: Female Singer	# 26	
2005	Herself	People's Choice: Female Singer	# 27	
2006	Herself	People's Choice: Female Singer	# 20	
2007	Herself	People's Choice: Female Singer	# 21	
2008	Herself	People's Choice: Female Singer	# 18^{[G]}	
2009	Herself	People's Choice: Female Singer	# 19^{[H]}	
2010	Herself	People's Choice: Female Singer	# 23^{[I]}	
2011	Herself	People's Choice: Female Singer	# 25^{[H]}	
2012	Herself	People's Choice: Female Singer	# 32	
2013	Herself	People's Choice: Female Singer	# 31	

Žebřík by Report, Czech Republic

Year	Nomination	Category	Result	Ref
1998	Herself	Female Singer	# 7^{[J]}	
1999	Herself	Female Singer	# 5	
2000	Herself	Female Singer	# 7	
2001	Herself	Female Singer	# 11	
2002	Herself	Female Singer	# 12	
2003	Herself	Female Singer	# 14	

Óčko by Stanice O, Czech Republic

Year	Nomination	Category	Result	Ref
2006	Herself	Czech R&B Act	# 4	

Notes

- E In 1998, Rolins shared her top ranking (#27) as Female Singer with Marcela Holanová.
- F In 2000, Rolins was classified in Teenagers' Choice list at No. 63.
- G Within the Slovak Act category, Rolins finished at No. 10 in 2008.
- H In 2009 and 2011, she was ranked as the 9th Slovak Act.
- I In 2010, Rolins finished at No. 11 in the Slovak category.
- J Within the Žebřík 1998 pool, Rolins was also classified as the 11th in the so-called Biggest Surprise category.

== See also ==
- The 100 Greatest Slovak Albums of All Time
