= Celeste Buckingham discography =

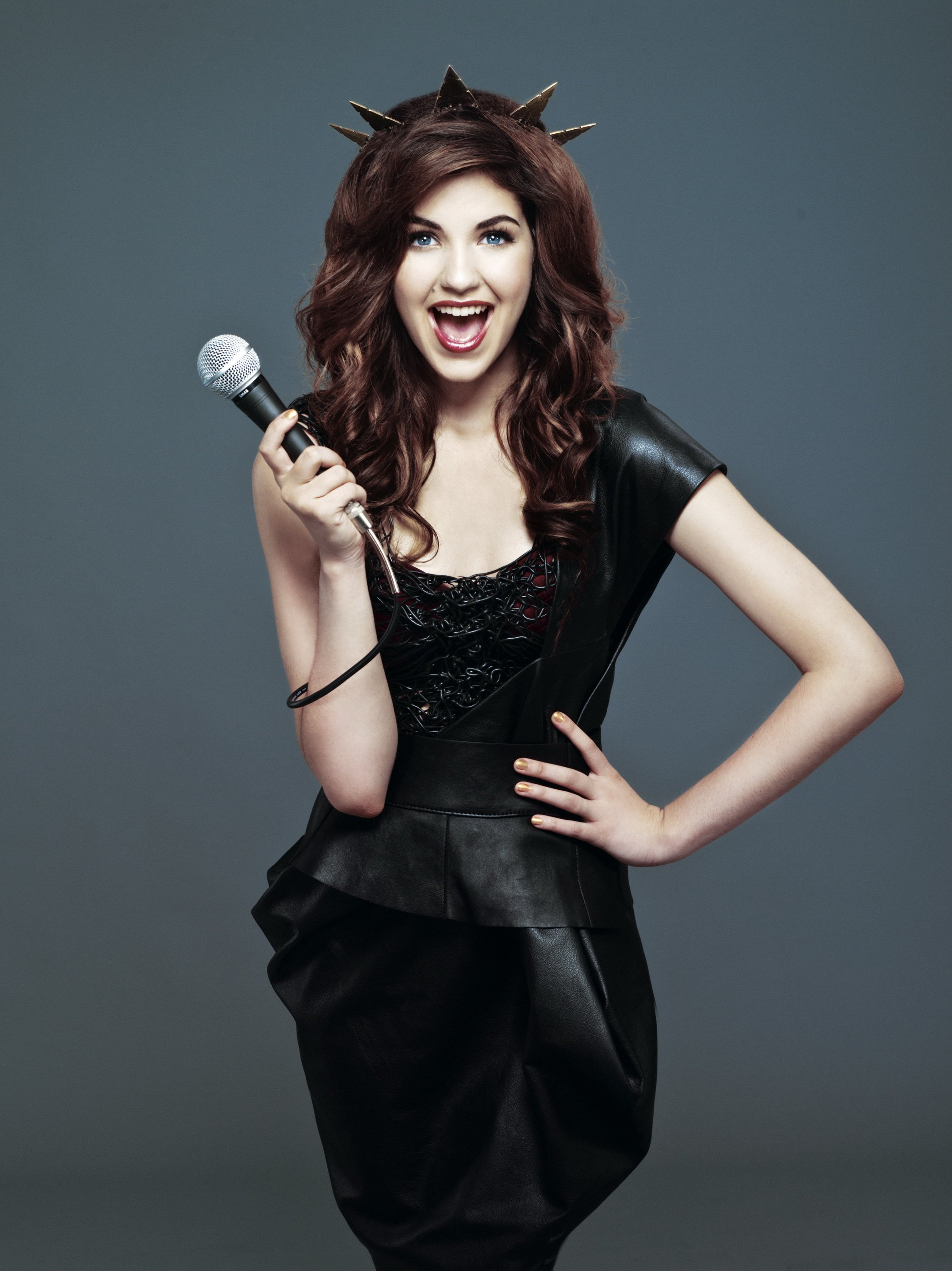

Releases:
Studio albums	3
Soundtracks	1
Singles	14
Music videos	12
Other appearances	3 Features
Unreleased songs	19

The discography of Slovak recording artist Celeste Buckingham consists of three studio albums, one compilation and fourteen singles, including three featuring her contribution. In addition to, she has appeared on twelve music videos, has two other appearances as well a number of unreleased songs.

Musically, Buckingham received her initial exposure at the age of fifteen, after being cast in the TV reality show Česko Slovenská SuperStar (2011); based on UK Pop Idol. However failed to earn the title, she managed to appear on the themed compilation Výběr finálových hitů, issued on May 9, 2011, by Universal Music. The soundtrack featuring vocal performances by the finalists of the talent series, peaked at number sixteen on the local albums chart, including also two compositions recorded by herself. While one of those served as her own cover version of a Stone's hit ("You Had Me"), the other was the album's hymn tune and ensemble track, "Nevzdávám". Following that, singer began collecting a material for her full-length record.

Her debut solo single, "Blue Guitar", arrived shortly through iTunes. Released on July 20, 2011, the song promptly cracked the Hot 50 of the component radio chart in her homebase country at number seven, reaching on the overall Top 100 list at number thirty-eight. Subsequently, on November 7, Buckingham scored another success. This time, though, in favor of a R&B mid-tempo called "Nobody Knows", accompanied with a music video. The work originally crafted as support for the VA compilation F84 to raise awareness of autism, climbed to number four on the Hot 50 in SK and to number seven in CZ, respectively. Meanwhile, her name was also credited on "Ja a ty", a duet delivered for the album Nový človek by male rapper Majk Spirit. After signing a distribution deal with EMI Records, her debut album Don't Look Back saw its eventual release on April 3, 2012.

== Albums ==
=== Studio albums ===
Year	Album details	Peak chart positions
Year	Album details	CZE
2012	Don't Look Back: Released: April 3, 2012 (May 14, 2012; iTunes); Label: CB/EMI (#669 135 2); Format: CD, digital download	37
2013	Where I Belong: Released: November 18, 2013; Label: CB (#0 015568 109454); Format: CD, digital download	41
2015	So Far So Good: Released: November 18, 2015; Label: CB (#0 015568 109454); Format: CD, digital download	

=== Soundtracks ===
Year	Album details	Peak chart positions
Year	Album details	CZE
2011	Česko Slovenská SuperStar: Released: May 9, 2011 (May 16, 2011 via iTunes); Label: Universal (#277 310 2); Format: CD, download	16

== Singles ==
=== As lead artist ===
Year	Single	Peak chart positions		Album
Year	Single	SVK	CZE	Album
2011	"Blue Guitar"	38	—	Don't Look Back
2011	"Nobody Knows"	48	28	Don't Look Back
2012	"Run Run Run"	2		Don't Look Back
2012	"Never Be You"	47	42	Where I Belong
2013	"I Was Wrong" featuring Majk Spirit	2	17	Where I Belong
2013	"Gone" featuring Carmel Buckingham	15	62	Where I Belong
2013	"Crushin' My Fairytale"	7		Where I Belong
2014	"I'm Not Sorry"	3	2	Where I Belong
2014	"Love in Your Soul"	32	49	(OST) Láska na vlásku
2015	"Unpredictable"	17	—	Non-album song
2015	"Loving You"	—	71	(EP) So Far, So Good
2016	"Hello"	54	58	(EP) So Far, So Good
2016	"My Last Song"	63	46	Non-album songs
2017	"One Life" (with Adam Mišík)	—	—	Non-album songs
2017	"Go Away"	25	65	BARE
2018	"Immature"	31	58	BARE
2021	"Feel"	18	—	Non-album song
2022	"Make Me"	36	—	Life
2023	"Another Life"	37	75	Life
2024	"Drive (Ruhde Remix)"	46	—	Non-album song
2024	"Pretty Girls"	—	63	Life
2025	"What Do I Do Now"	—	63	TBA
"—" denotes a single that did not chart or was not released in that region.

=== As featured artist ===
Year	Single	Peak chart positions		Album
Year	Single	SVK	CZE	Album
2011	"Nevzdávám" with VA	—	—	Výběr finálových hitů
2012	"Ja a ty" with Majk Spirit	48	—	Nový človek
2012	"Swing (Single version)" with AMO	46	—	non-album song
2016	"Taký nejsom" with VLADIS	70	—	Generacia II Kalašnikov
2023	"Venuša" with Dominika Mirgová	—	—	Wonder Woman
"—" denotes a single that did not chart or was not released in that region.

== Other appearances ==
Year	Song	Notes
2011	"Somebody"	Released only as a download song through the Apple's online music store iTunes on November 7, 2011
2013	"Let It Snow! Let It Snow! Let It Snow!" (Cover)	Recorded for VA Christmas compilation Priatelia Vianoc (#SOZA 2281–001–2), issued on December 16, 2013, for free at the Slovak branch of Lidl supermarkets with purchases over €20.

=== Unreleased songs ===
Year	Song	Notes
2011	"Hey, Soul Sister" (by Train)	Unreleased tracks all recorded and performed live for the TV reality show Česko Slovenská SuperStar that broadcast from February 20 until June 5, 2011, on TV Nova in the Czech Republic and Markíza in Slovakia, respectively.
2011	"Bad Romance" (by Lady Gaga)	Unreleased tracks all recorded and performed live for the TV reality show Česko Slovenská SuperStar that broadcast from February 20 until June 5, 2011, on TV Nova in the Czech Republic and Markíza in Slovakia, respectively.
2011	"Unfaithful (Live)" (by Rihanna)	Unreleased tracks all recorded and performed live for the TV reality show Česko Slovenská SuperStar that broadcast from February 20 until June 5, 2011, on TV Nova in the Czech Republic and Markíza in Slovakia, respectively.
2011	"Mercy (Live)" (by Duffy)	Unreleased tracks all recorded and performed live for the TV reality show Česko Slovenská SuperStar that broadcast from February 20 until June 5, 2011, on TV Nova in the Czech Republic and Markíza in Slovakia, respectively.
2011	"Listen (Live)" (by Beyoncé Knowles)	Unreleased tracks all recorded and performed live for the TV reality show Česko Slovenská SuperStar that broadcast from February 20 until June 5, 2011, on TV Nova in the Czech Republic and Markíza in Slovakia, respectively.
2011	"Nekráčaj predo mnou (Live)" (by Zuzana Smatanová)	Unreleased tracks all recorded and performed live for the TV reality show Česko Slovenská SuperStar that broadcast from February 20 until June 5, 2011, on TV Nova in the Czech Republic and Markíza in Slovakia, respectively.
2012	"Rolling in the Deep (Live)" (by Adele)	Performed for the 24-episode Christmas special Slovensko 2012 Advent, aired by RTVS. The live show ran from November 26 to December 23, 2012.

== Videos ==
=== Music videos ===
Year	Song	Director(s)
2011	"Sweet 17" by Jan Bendig	Michal Skořepa
2011	"Nobody Knows"	Braňo Vincze
2012	"Run Run Run"	Tomáš Kasal
2012	"Ja a ty" with Majk Spirit	DJ Lowa, Drahouš Lysák
2012	"Swing" with AMO	Martin Hudák
2012	"Never Be You"	Roland Wraník
2013	"I Was Wrong" with Majk Spirit	Jiří Marshal
2013	"Gone" with Carmel Buckingham	Kasal
2013	"Crushin' My Fairytale"	Hudák
2014	"I'm Not Sorry"	Hudák
2014	"Love in Your Soul"	Mariana Čengel Solčanská
2015	"Unpredictable"	Celeste and David W. Ruby

== See also ==
- List of number-one songs (Slovakia)
- List of number-one songs (Czech Republic)
- The 100 Greatest Slovak Albums of All Time
