= List of awards and nominations received by Celeste Buckingham =

Celeste Buckingham awards and nominations
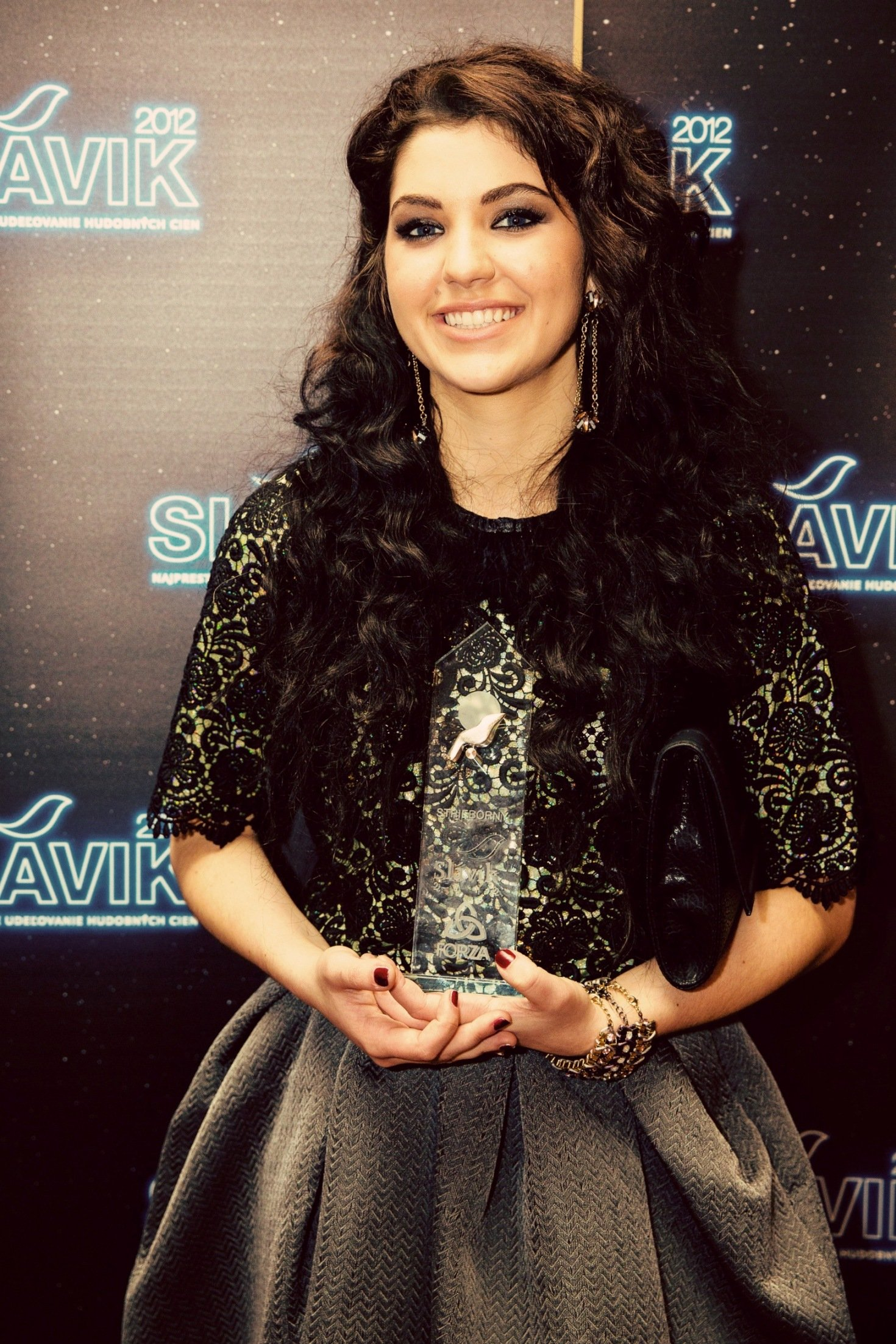
- Photo: Lukáš Dvořák
Totals:
Award	Wins	Nominations
E2 Awards	5	5
MTV Awards	1	3
OTO Awards	3	3
Óčko Awards	1	3
RDM Awards	0	1
Slávik Awards	1	5
SOZA Awards	0	1
ZAI Awards	0	1
Žebřík Awards	1	3
Year-end charts	1	6
Others	1	3
Awards won	14
Nominations	34

As of March 2014, Celeste Buckingham has accumulated thirty-two awards and/or nominations in recognition of her early success in the music genre. On November 17, 2012 she was nominated for the MTV Europe Music Awards as the Best Czech & Slovak Act. However, on November 11, 2012 lost in favor of her fellow Majk Spirit, singer was then only female nominee out of five presented artists for the regional category, having placed the second. On January 16, 2013 the Slávik Awards nominations were announced in her home country. For this occasion, she overall earned four nominations, including the category New Artist of the Year that she won on February 3, 2013. Simultaneously with that, Buckingham also became the runner-up for the major female category at the ceremony, for which she earned a silver trophy at least.

One day preceding the annual event, on February 2, the later victor of the gold prize, Tina, would compliment her youngest rival via a social networking website. Her Facebook statement cited the Czech BRAVO magazine, too. "I don't want it to sound silly or thankless, but I think that for the year 2012 the award should be deserved by Celeste Buckingham. I watch her from distance already since the SuperStar, where I'd met her, and [I] have to say [that] no other female vocalist in Slovakia has done in the past period of time such a deal of work than she has. Undoubtedly she had the most played songs, most concerts, a good sale, fans found their way to her and they did well. She is a phenomenon and [she] deserves to get the credit [...]." Buckingham eventually missed the main prize by 83 votes.

Some of her additional nominations for poll-oriented awards included one for the SK TV-based OTOs, her winning, two nominations at the Žebřík Music Awards by CZ magazine REPORT, winning one category, two winning nominations for the recently established Evropa 2 Awards named after the CZ radio station, and a nomination for the CZ Óčko Awards held by a local music TV. In terms of the year-end charts, her signature song "Run Run Run" was ranked as the most played SK composition of 2012, while second in the CZ territory, and she was also voted the Most Desired Female Singer within an online poll organized by Feminity.sk. Based on the Google's annual report Zeitgeist, Buckingham was listed among the most sought-after celebrities on the internet for the year of 2012, being rated as the fourth within the SK entertainment industry and ninth in the CZ show business, respectively.

== Music awards ==
=== E2 Music Awards ===
The Evropa 2 in Czech Republic, or rather Europa 2 Music Awards in Slovakia, were originally established by CZ contemporary hit radio Evropa 2 in March 2013. The following year a SK sister station transcribed as Europa 2, addtionally joined the project. The awards are given overall in eleven categories, divided per domestic and international artists with exception of the New Artist of the Year category, which is collective. While the winners are voted by radio listeners online, the annual ceremony is permitted live by both involved radios. Buckingham has been nominated five times.

Year	Nominated work	Category	Result
2012	"Run Run Run"	Song of the Year — Domestic	Won
2012	Herself	Female Singer of the Year — Domestic	Won
2013	Herself	Female Singer of the Year — Domestic	Won
2013	"I Was Wrong" with Majk Spirit	Song of the Year — Domestic	Won
2014	Herself	Female Singer of the Year — Domestic	Won

=== MTV Awards ===
==== MTV Europe Music Awards ====
Since 1994, the MTV Europe Music Awards are presented annually by Viacom International Media Networks (known as MTV Networks Europe until 2011). As an equivalent to the American MTV Video Music Awards, the awards are primarily aimed at and chosen by MTV's European viewers, while broadcast live on MTV Europe, MTV Live HD and most of the international MTV channels as well as online. Buckingham has been nominated three times — twice in a regional category, winning in 2013, while once as the Best Eastern European Act.

Year	Nominated work	Category	Result
2012	Herself	Best Czech & Slovak Act	Runner-up^{[A]}
2013	Herself	Best Czech & Slovak Act	Won
2013	Herself	Best Eastern European Act	Nominated

Notes

- A The award won her fellow male hip-hop artist Majk Spirit from Slovakia, while the other nominees included Ben Cristovao of Czech-Angola origins, pop rock quintet Mandrage and indie rock quartet Sunshine, both from the Czech Republic.

=== OTO Awards ===
Osobnosť televíznej obrazovky (OTO), thus Television Screen Personality in English, is an annual poll recognizing the people and the work of popular culture in Slovakia. As such, the winners are voted on by the general public the most favorite television personalities and/or programs. Established in 2000 by Art Production Agency (APA), it is aired by the national network Slovenská televízia. Buckingham was nominated three times, winning each respective year.

Year	Nominated work	Category	Result
2012	Herself	Female Singer	Won^{[B]}
2013	Herself	Female Singer	Won
2014	Herself	Female Singer	Won

Notes

- B The additional nominees featured Zuzana Smatanová and Nela Pocisková.

=== Óčko Music Awards ===
The Óčko Music Awards (Hudební ceny Óčko in Czech) are presented by the first television music channel focusing predominantly on playing music videos in the Czech Republic, Óčko (previously known as Stanice O). Launched in 2002, the annual event included a number of different awards originally divided into local and international categories. Until 2011 the gala show was broadcast live featuring performances by the nominated artists. Since 2012, only local categories are effective, such as Male Singer of the Year, Female Singer of the Year, Band of the Year, Music Video of the Year and New Artist of the Year. While the nominees/winners are voted by the TV viewers online, the awards are also given by the voters themselves. So far Buckingham was nominated three times, winning once.

Year	Nominated work	Category	Result
2012	Herself	New Artist of the Year	4th Place^{[C]}
2013	Herself	Female Singer of the Year	Won
2013	"I Was Wrong" with Majk Spirit	Music Video of the Year	Nominated

Notes

- C The winner Voxel, (aka Václav Lebeda), a pop male singer from the Czech Republic, was followed by the second indie rock group A-Banquet from CZ, and Peter Bič Project from Slovakia who placed the third. Buckingham herself scored at number four.

=== RDM Awards ===
The Radio Disney Music Awards is an annual awards show by American radio network Radio Disney. Honoring the biggest achievements of a respective year in music industry, their winners are voted by teen viewers. Buckingham has been nominated once.

Year	Nominated work	Category	Result
2014	Herself	Best New Artist — The Freshest	Nominated

=== Slávik Awards ===
In Slovakia, the Slávik Awards were established in 1998 as an equivalent to the national music poll Zlatý slavík (until 1991 effective in former Czechoslovakia). The people's choice awards were given in three major categories, such as Male Singer of the Year, Female Singer of the Year, and Band of the Year. Additional nominations featured the New Artist of the Year, Radio Artist, Song of the Year, and others. Broadcast live on TV JOJ since 2011, the event was held in collaboration with the agency OKLAMČÁK Production. Buckingham was nominated four times at the final volume of the show, winning one category eventually.

==== Czech Republic ====
Year	Nominated work	Category	Result
2014	Herself	Slovak Artist and/or Band	3rd Place

==== Slovakia ====
Year	Nominated work	Category	Result
2012	Herself	New Artist of the Year	Won
2012	Herself	Female Singer of the Year	Runner-up^{[D]}
2012	"Run Run Run"	Song of the Year	3rd Place^{[E]}
2012	www.celestebuckingham.com	Website of the Year	3rd Place^{[F]}

Notes

- D The gold trophy for the female category went to R&B performer Tina, while the bronze to Zuzana Smatanová.
- E The category won "Žijeme len raz" by Ego featuring Robert Burian, followed by "Ženy treba ľúbiť" by Majk Spirit (rated as the second), the duet "Klid, mír a pokora" by Richard Müller and Tereza Kerndlová (the fourth) and "Zmier svetlo s tmou" by Katarína Knechtová (as the fifth).
- F The online survey established in collaboration with www.pokec.sk, won the official website by Zuzana Smatanová and Martin Harich, respectively. Buckingham that placed the third in the row was followed by the group Desmod (the fourth) and Majk Spirit (the fifth).

=== SOZA Awards ===
Year	Nominated work	Category	Result
2012	"Run, Run, Run"	Most Played Song of the Year	Nominated

=== ZAI Awards ===
Year	Nominated work	Category	Result
2013	Herself	Solo Vocal Artist or Ensemble	Nominated

=== Žebřík Music Awards ===
Buckingham has been nominated three times, winning once.

Year	Nominated work	Category	Result
2012	"Run Run Run"	Song of the Year — Domestic	Won
2012	Herself	New Artist of the Year — Domestic	3rd Place^{[G]}
2013	Herself	Female Singer — Domestic	Nominated

Notes

- G The winner became A Banquet, followed by the second Calm Season and herself, being voted as the third. The additional nominees included Barbora Poláková, and Nebe.

== Year-end charts ==
Year	Nominated work	Chart/Survey	Category	Result
2012	"Run Run Run"	Rádio SK 50 Oficiálna	Most Played Song of the Year	Won
2012	"Run Run Run"	Rádio CZ 50 Oficiální	Most Played Song of the Year	Runner-up
2012	"Run Run Run"	Rádio Top 100 Oficiálna	Most Played Song of the Year	8th Place
2012	"Run Run Run"	Óčko Top 100	Most Played Song of the Year	29th Place
2013	"I Was Wrong" with Majk Spirit	Óčko Top 100	Most Played Song of the Year	26th Place
2013	Where I Belong	MusicServer.cz	Best Domestic Album of the Year	3rd Place

== Others ==
=== Feminity.sk ===
Year	Nominated work	Chart/Survey	Category	Result
2012	Herself	Feminity.sk	Most Desired Female Singer	Won

=== Google Zeitgeist ===
Year	Nominated work	Chart/Survey	Category	Result
2012	Herself	Most Sought-after Celebrities	Slovak Entertainment Industry	4th Place^{[H]}
2012	Herself	Most Sought-after Celebrities	Czech Entertainment Industry	9th Place^{[I]}

Notes

- H Within Slovak entertainment, Buckingham was preceded by Majk Spirit (rapper), Peter Sagan (Junior World Championship-winner) and Ego (rapper).
- I In the Czech neighborhood, singer was surpassed by David Rath (politician), Aneta Savarová (presenter), Ornella Štiková (model), Jaro Slávik (producer), Ivanna Benešová (film director), Vladimír Franz (performer), Tamara Koubová (make-up artist and Emmy Award-nominee) and Nela Slováková (Paradise Hotel winner).

== See also ==
- Celeste Buckingham discography
- Celeste Buckingham filmography
