= Run Run Run (Celeste Buckingham song) =

- The official music video for the song was directed by Tomáš Kasal.

Single by Celeste Buckingham

from the album Don't Look Back
- Released: April 4, 2012
- Recorded: 2012
- Genre: Pop; soul; breakbeat
- Length: 3:42
- Label: CB/EMI
- Songwriter(s): Celeste Buckingham, Andrej Hruška, Martin Šrámek
- Producer(s): Celeste Buckingham, Andrej Hruška, Martin Šrámek

Celeste Buckingham singles chronology
"Ja a ty" (2012)	"Run Run Run" (2012)	"Swing" (2012)

Audio sample
- file; help

Music video
- "Run Run Run" on YouTube

"Run Run Run" is a 2012 song by the Slovak recording artist Celeste Buckingham. Released on April 4, 2012, the singer herself wrote the song, with assistance from producers Andrej Hruška and Martin Šrámek.

The official music video was credited to the director Tomáš Kasal.

== Credits and personnel ==
- Celeste Buckingham - lead vocalist, writer, producer, publisher
- Andrej Hruška - writer, producer, guitar
- Martin Šrámek - writer, producer, keyboard
- LittleBeat - recording studio
- EMI Czech Republic - distributor

== Track listings ==
1. "Run Run Run" (Album version) — 3:42

== Charts ==
=== Weekly charts ===
Chart (2012)	Peak position
Slovak Top 100 (Rádio Top 100 Oficiálna)	2
Slovak Hot 50 (Rádio SK 50 Oficiálna)	1
Czech Top 100 (Rádio Top 100 Oficiální)	2
Czech Hot 50 (Rádio CZ 50 Oficiální)	1
Chart (2013)	Peak position
Czech Top 20 Music Videos on YouTube	2

=== Year-end charts ===
Chart (2012)	Peak position
Slovak Top 100	8
Slovak Hot 50	1
Czech Hot 50	2
Óčko Top 100	29

== Music awards and nominations ==
Year	Nominated work	Award	Category	Result
2012	"Run Run Run"	MTV Europe Music Awards	Best Czech & Slovak Act	won
2012	"Run Run Run"	Slávik Awards	Song of the Year	3rd Place
2012	"Run Run Run"	Žebřík Music Awards	Song of the Year — Domestic	Won
2013	"Run Run Run"	Evropa 2 Music Awards	Song of the Year — Domestic	Won
Note: Awards are listed in order of the effective years, annual ceremonies are usually held the following.

== See also ==
- List of number-one songs (Slovakia)
- List of number-one songs (Czech Republic)
