= Česko Slovenská SuperStar season 2 =

Česko Slovenská SuperStar
- Season 2
- Hosted by: Leoš Mareš; Tina
- Judges: Rytmus; Gábina Osvaldová; Helena Zeťová; Pavol Habera
- Winner: Lukáš Adamec
- Runner-up: Gabriela Gunčíková
- Finals venue: Incheba Expo Prague

Release
- Original network: Nova; Markíza
- Original release: February 20 – June 5, 2011

Season chronology
- ← Previous; Season 1 Next → Season 3

Česko Slovenská SuperStar (English: Czech&Slovak SuperStar) is the joint Czech-Slovak version of Idol series' Pop Idol merged from Česko hledá SuperStar and Slovensko hľadá SuperStar which previous to that had three individual seasons each. The second season premiered in February 2011 with castings held in Prague, Brno, Bratislava and Košice. It is broadcast on two channels: «TV Nova» (Czech Republic) and «Markíza» (Slovakia) which have also been the broadcast stations for the individual seasons. Also both hosts have been their hosts countries before as have been three out of the four judges. To legitimate a fair chance for each country's contestants to reach the final, twelve of the contestants will compete split into genders and nationalities in the semifinals, guaranteeing a 50% share for each country in the top 12.

== Regional auditions ==
Auditions were held in Bratislava, Košice, Prague, Brno in the winter of 2010–2011.

Audition City	Date
Brno, Czech Republic	December 11, 2010
Bratislava, Slovakia	December 18, 2010
Košice, Slovakia	January 9, 2011
Prague, Czech Republic	January 15, 2011

== Divadlo ==
In Divadlo (Theater) were 100 contestants. The contestants first emerged on stage in groups of 9 or 10 but performed solo unaccompanied, and those who did not impress the judges were cut after the group finished their individual performances. 40 made it to the next round Dlouhá cesta. 24 contestants made it to the Semi-final.

== Semi-final ==
24 semifinalists were revealed in March when the show premiered on screen. Six boys and six girls from both countries competed for a spot in the top 12. In three Semifinals the guys performed on Saturday and the girls on Sunday night. The following Monday the lowest vote getter from each gender and country got eliminated (the viewers could vote for contestants from both countries). It means that three Czech and Slovak boys and three Czech and Slovak girls would make the finals.

=== Top 24 – Females ===
Order	Contestant	Song (original artist)	Result
1	Aneta Salačová	"Zatmění" (Leona Machálková)	Safe
2	Monika Povýšilová	"At Last" (Etta James)	Safe
3	Sára Milfajtová	"No One" (Alicia Keys)	Safe
4	Jana Karasová	"Empire State of Mind" (Alicia Keys)	Eliminated
5	Alžběta Kolečkářová	"Bad Day" (Daniel Powter)	Safe
6	Gabriela Gunčíková	"Alone" (Heart)	Safe
7	Alexandra Vokáliková	"I'll Be There" (Tiffany Evans)	Safe
8	Dorota Dragulová	"I Will Always Love You" (Whitney Houston)	Safe
9	Simona Fecková	"When I Look at You" (Miley Cyrus)	Safe
10	Petra Huliaková	"Vráť mi tie hviezdy" (Kristína)	Eliminated
11	Klaudia Pappová	"Impossible" (Christina Aguilera)	Safe
12	Celeste Buckingham	"Unfaithful" (Rihanna)	Safe

=== Top 24 – Males ===
Order	Contestant	Song (original artist)	Result
1	Jan Ráček	"Whataya Want from Me" (Adam Lambert)	Eliminated
2	Petr Ševčík	"Cryin'" (Aerosmith)	Safe
3	Tomáš Jurenka	"Everything" (Michael Bublé)	Safe
4	Michal Šeps	"I Shot the Sheriff" (Bob Marley)	Safe
5	Noah Scott Ellenwood	"Come Together" (The Beatles)	Safe
6	Martin Kurc	"Heaven" (Bryan Adams)	Safe
7	Martin Harich	"21 Guns" (Green Day)	Safe
8	Lukáš Adamec	"I'm Yours" (Jason Mraz)	Safe
9	Jerguš Oravec	"Ain't No Sunshine" (Bill Withers)	Safe
10	Lukáš Ondruš	"Večnosť" (No Name)	Safe
11	Matej Piňák	"If There's Any Justice" (Lemar)	Safe
12	Marcel Dragúň	"She's So High" (Kurt Nielsen)	Eliminated

=== Top 20 – Females ===
Order	Contestant	Song (original artist)	Result
1	Aneta Salačová	"Un-Break My Heart" (Toni Braxton)	Safe
2	Monika Povýšilová	"Poker Face" (Lady Gaga)	Safe
3	Sára Milfajtová	"I'm Like a Bird" (Nelly Furtado)	Eliminated
4	Alžběta Kolečkářová	"You Know I'm No Good" (Amy Winehouse)	Safe
5	Gabriela Gunčíková	"Love Hurts" (Nazareth)	Safe
6	Alexandra Vokáliková	"Strong Enough" (Cher)	Safe
7	Dorota Dragulová	"White Horse" (Taylor Swift)	Eliminated
8	Simona Fecková	"Skvělý nápad" (Aneta Langerová)	Safe
9	Klaudia Pappová	"Nah Neh Nah" (Vaya Con Dios)	Safe
12	Celeste Buckingham	"Mercy" (Duffy)	Safe

=== Top 20 – Males ===
Order	Contestant	Song (original artist)	Result
1	Petr Ševčík	"This Is the Last Time" (Keane)	Safe
2	Tomáš Jurenka	"Chci tě líbat" (Václav Neckář)	Eliminated
3	Michal Šeps	"Eternal Flame" (The Bangles)	Safe
4	Noah Scott Ellenwood	"Just the Way You Are" (Bruno Mars)	Safe
5	Martin Kurc	"Right Here Waiting" (Richard Marx)	Safe
6	Martin Harich	"Som na tebe závislý" (Desmod)	Safe
7	Lukáš Adamec	"Nepriznaná" (Václav Patejdl)	Safe
8	Jerguš Oravec	"Under the Bridge" (Red Hot Chili Peppers)	Safe
9	Lukáš Ondruš	"Can You Feel the Love Tonight" (Elton John)	Eliminated
10	Matej Piňák	"Láska moja" (Elán)	Safe

=== Top 16 – Females ===
Order	Contestant	Song (original artist)	Result
1	Aneta Salačová	"Without You" (Mariah Carey)	Eliminated
2	Monika Povýšilová	"I Have Nothing" (Whitney Houston)	Safe
3	Alžběta Kolečkářová	"Jealous Guy" (John Lennon)	Safe
4	Gabriela Gunčíková	"Send Me an Angel" (Scorpions)	Safe
5	Alexandra Vokáliková	"Soulmate" (Natasha Bedingfield)	Eliminated
6	Simona Fecková	"Búrka" (Mária Čírová)	Safe
7	Klaudia Pappová	"I Say a Little Prayer" (Aretha Franklin)	Safe
8	Celeste Buckingham	"Listen" (Beyoncé Knowles)	Safe

=== Top 16 – Males ===
Order	Contestant	Song (original artist)	Result
1	Petr Ševčík	"You Raise Me Up" (Westlife)	Safe
2	Michal Šeps	"What a Wonderful World" (Louis Armstrong)	Safe
3	Noah Scott Ellenwood	"Haven't Met You Yet" (Michael Bublé)	Eliminated
4	Martin Kurc	"Your Song" (Ewan McGregor)	Safe
5	Martin Harich	"She's the One" (Robbie Williams)	Safe
6	Lukáš Adamec	"Imagine" (John Lennon)	Safe
7	Jerguš Oravec	"Wish You Were Here" (Pink Floyd)	Eliminated
8	Matej Piňák	"She's Out of My Life" (Michael Jackson)	Safe

== Finalist ==
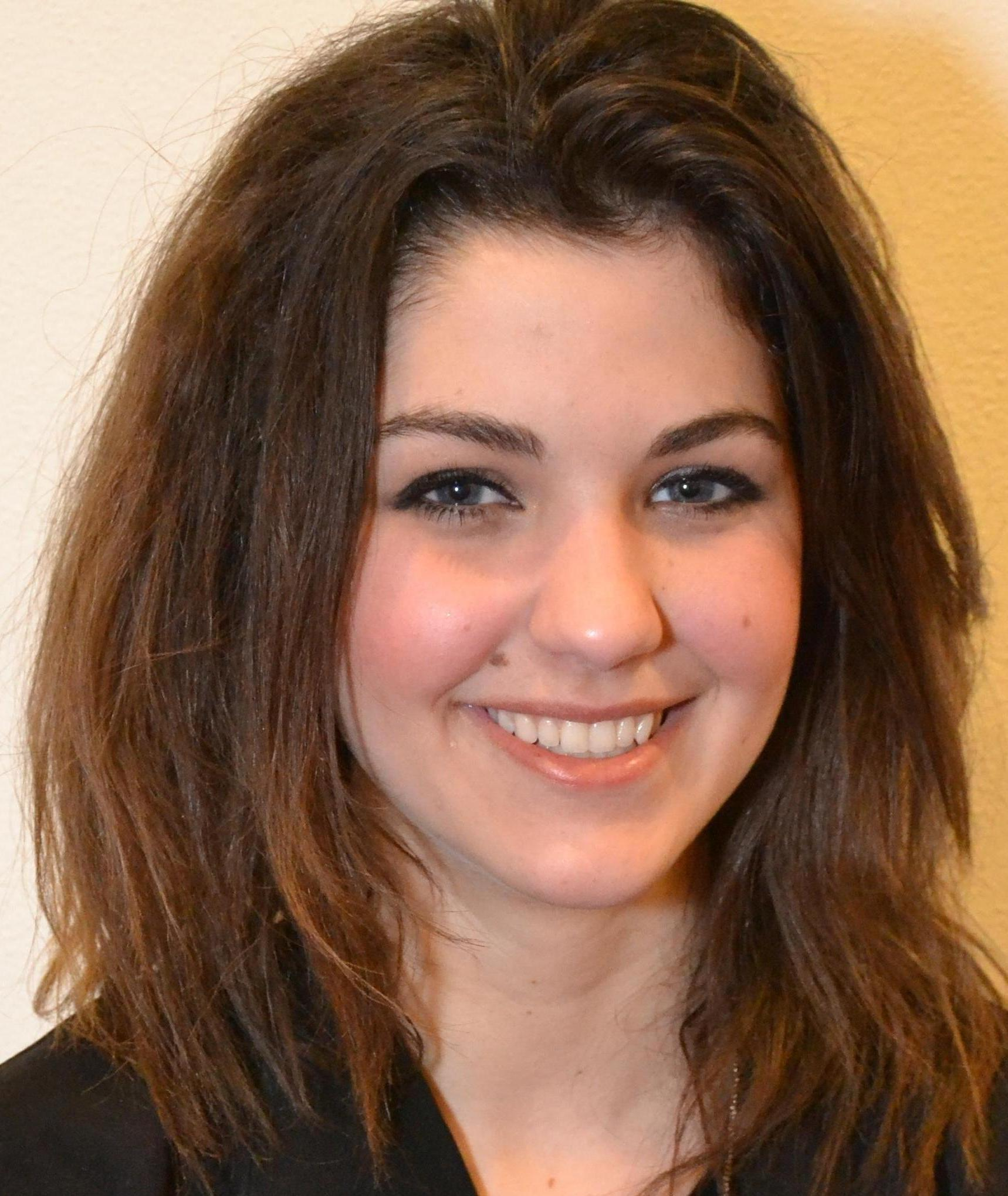
Celeste Buckingham

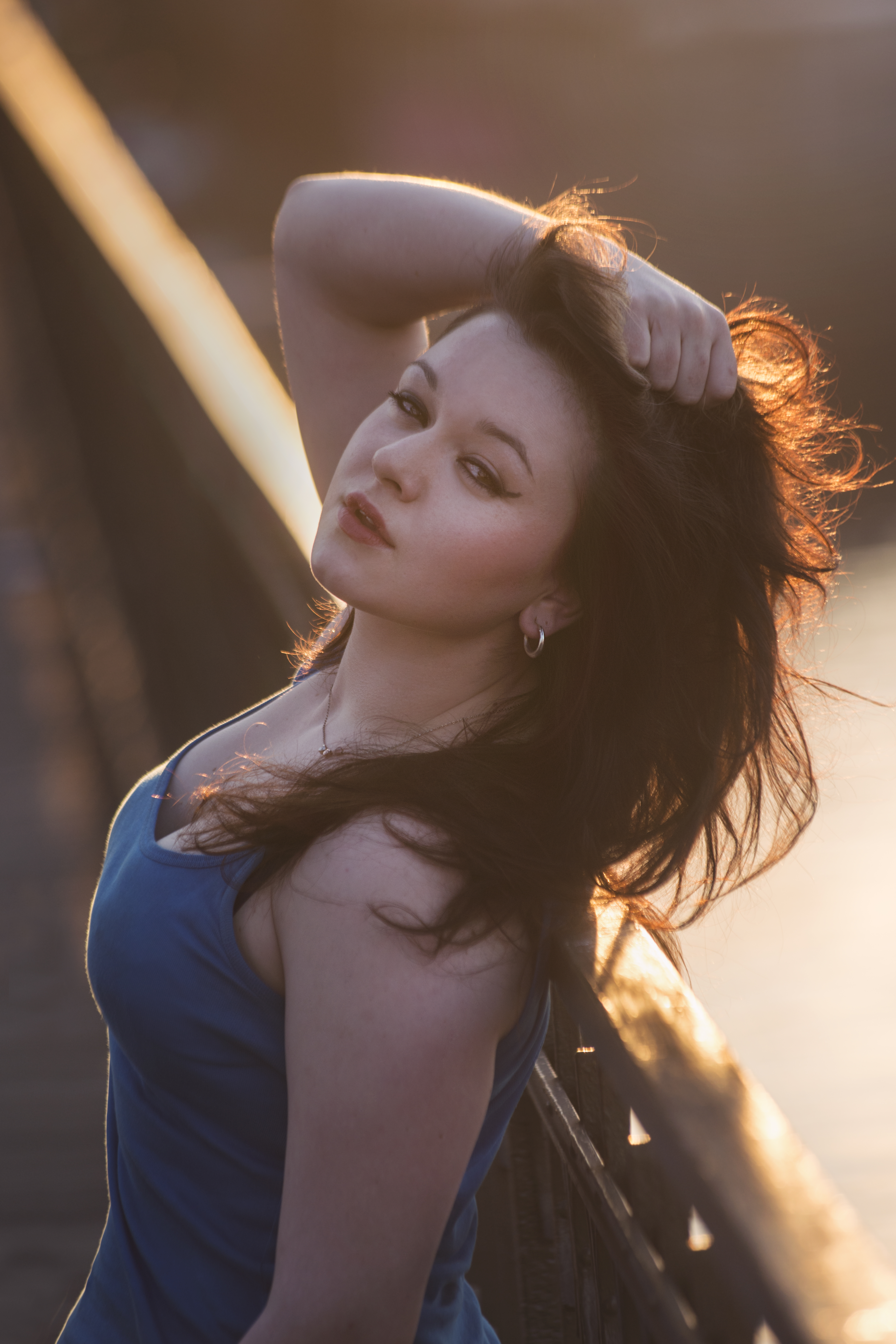
Alžběta Kolečkářová

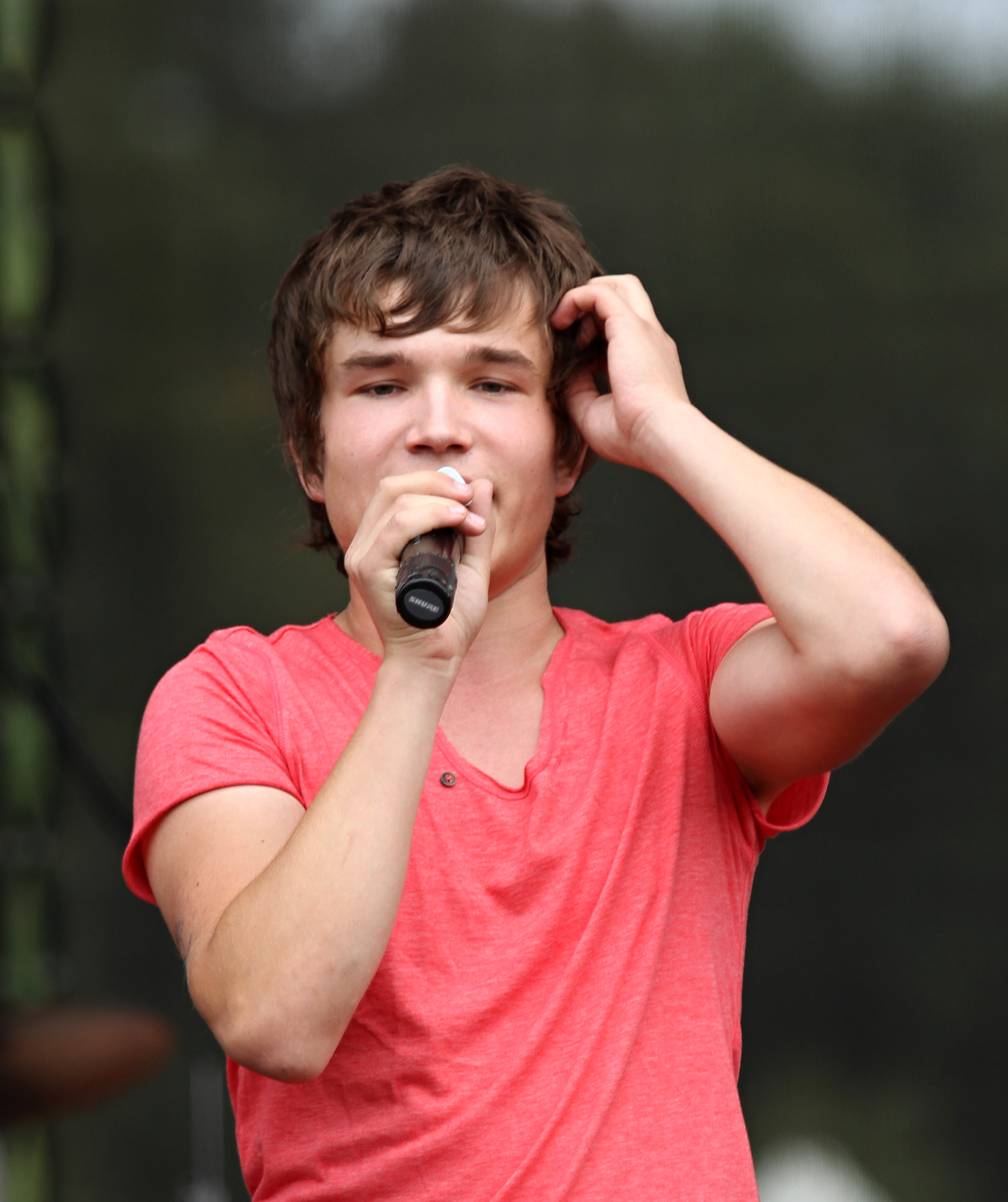
Martin Harich

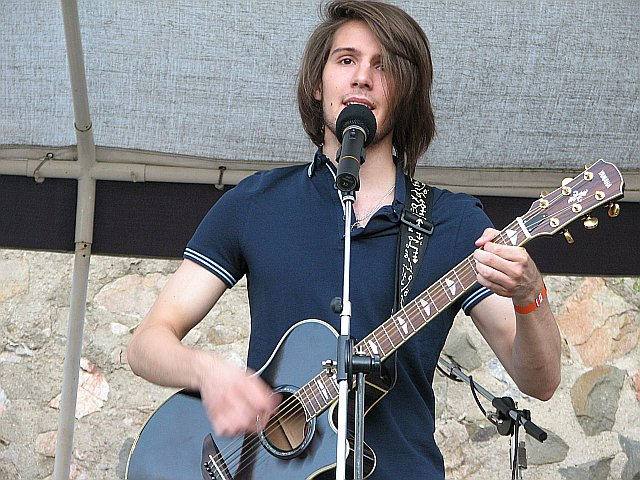
Petr Ševčík

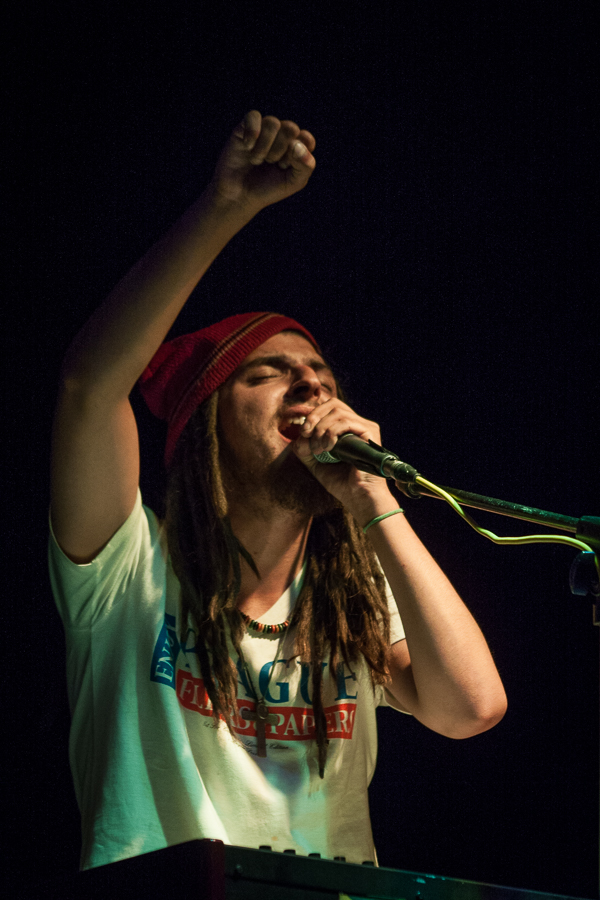
Michal Šeps

Contestant	Age	Hometown	Place finished
Lukáš Adamec	24	Košice, Slovakia	Winner
Gabriela Gunčíková	17	Kroměříž, Czech Republic	Runner-up
Michal Šeps	16	Trutnov, Czech Republic	3rd
Martin Harich	15	Liptovský Mikuláš, Slovakia	4th
Petr Ševčík	19	Brno, Czech Republic	5th
Martin Kurc	17	Brno, Czech Republic	6th
Alžběta Kolečkářová	19	Napajedla, Czech Republic	7th
Simona Fecková	21	Košice, Slovakia	8th
Matej Piňák	25	Hlohovec, Slovakia	9th
Celeste Buckingham	15	Borinka, Slovakia	10th
Monika Povýšilová	18	Olomouc, Czech Republic	11th
Klaudia Pappová	20	Matúškovo, Slovakia	12th

== Finals ==
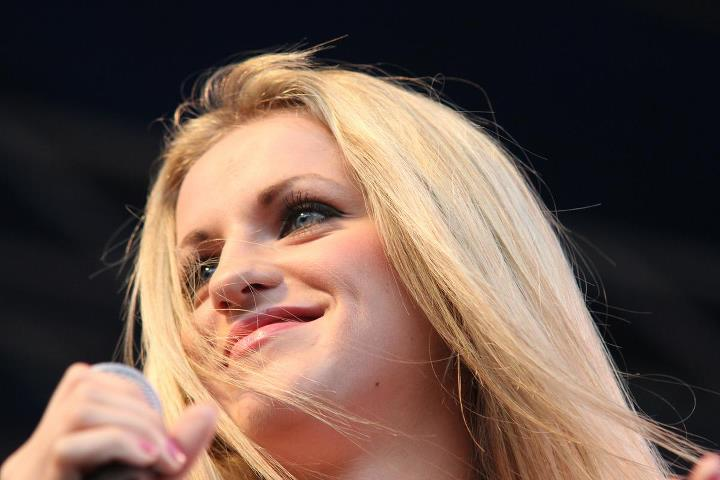
Gabriela Gunčíková

Twelve contestants made it to the finals. TOP 12 consists of 3 Slovak boys, 3 Czech boys, 3 Slovak girls and 3 Czech girls. The first single recorded by TOP 12 is called "Nevzdávám" (Ain't Giving Up). Every final night has its theme. Audience can vote for contestants from the very beginning of the show, voting ends during result show day after. There were double eliminations in first two final rounds while only one contestant is being eliminated once the candidates got reduced to TOP 8. All gender and nationality quotas are abolished in the finals.

=== Top 12 – My Idol ===
Order	Contestant	Song (original artist)	Result
1	Simona Fecková	"My Number One" (Helena Paparizou)	Safe
2	Matej Piňák	"Virtual Insanity" (Jamiroquai)	Safe
3	Klaudia Pappová	"Doesn't Mean Anything" (Alicia Keys)	Eliminated
4	Petr Ševčík	"Come What May" (Ewan McGregor)&(Nicole Kidman)	Safe
5	Monika Povýšilová	"Beautiful" (Christina Aguilera)	Eliminated
6	Martin Harich	"Come Undone" (Robbie Williams)	Safe
7	Gabriela Gunčíková	"U + Ur Hand" (Pink)	Safe
8	Lukáš Adamec	"Are You Gonna Go My Way" (Lenny Kravitz)	Safe
9	Alžběta Kolečkářová	"Cry Baby" (Janis Joplin)	Safe
10	Martin Kurc	"Crazy" (Seal)	Safe
11	Celeste Buckingham	"You Had Me" (Joss Stone)	Safe
12	Michal Šeps	"No Woman No Cry" (Bob Marley)	Safe

=== Top 10 – Czech and Slovak Hits ===
Order	Contestant	Song (original artist)	Result
1	Simona Fecková	"Modrá" (Jana Kirschner)	Safe
2	Matej Piňák	"22 dní" (Miroslav Žbirka)	Eliminated
3	Petr Ševčík	"Ráchel" (Oceán)	Safe
4	Martin Harich	"Ľudia nie sú zlí" (IMT Smile)	Safe
5	Gabriela Gunčíková	"Země vzdálená" (BSP)	Safe
6	Lukáš Adamec	"Držím ti miesto" (Pavol Habera)	Safe
7	Alžběta Kolečkářová	"SMS" (Lucie Bílá)	Safe
8	Martin Kurc	"Trezor" (Karel Gott)	Safe
9	Celeste Buckingham	"Nekráčaj predo mnou" (Zuzana Smatanová)	Eliminated
10	Michal Šeps	"Já na to mám" (Natural)	Safe

=== Top 8 – Dance ===
Order	Contestant	Song (original artist)	Result
1	Simona Fecková	"Hung Up" (Madonna)	Eliminated
2	Petr Ševčík	"I Like It" (Enrique Iglesias)	Safe
3	Martin Harich	"Grace Kelly" (Mika)	Safe
4	Gabriela Gunčíková	"Firework" (Katy Perry)	Safe
5	Lukáš Adamec	"Crazy" (Gnarls Barkley)	Safe
6	Alžběta Kolečkářová	"Papa Was a Rollin' Stone" (The Temptations)	Safe
7	Martin Kurc	"Livin' La Vida Loca" (Ricky Martin)	Safe
8	Michal Šeps	"Somewhere Over the Rainbow" (Israel Kamakawiwo'ole)	Safe

=== Top 7 – Rock ===
Order	Contestant	Song (original artist)	Result
1	Petr Ševčík	"Highway to Hell" (AC/DC)	Safe
2	Martin Harich	"Beautiful Day" (U2)	Saved
3	Gabriela Gunčíková	"I Don't Wanna Miss a Thing" (Aerosmith)	Safe
4	Lukáš Adamec	"Whiskey in the Jar" (Metallica)	Safe
5	Alžběta Kolečkářová	"Dreamer" (Ozzy Osbourne)	Safe
6	Martin Kurc	"It's My Life" (Jon Bon Jovi)	Safe
7	Michal Šeps	"Satisfaction" (The Rolling Stones)	Safe
8	Petr Ševčík	"Behind Blue Eyes" (Limp Bizkit)	Safe
9	Martin Harich	"The Scientist" (Coldplay)	Saved
10	Gabriela Gunčíková	"The Final Countdown" (Europe)	Safe
11	Lukáš Adamec	"More Than Words" (Extreme)	Safe
12	Alžběta Kolečkářová	"You Oughta Know" (Alanis Morissette)	Safe
13	Martin Kurc	"(Everything I Do) I Do It for You" (Bryan Adams)	Safe
14	Michal Šeps	"Iron Man" (Black Sabbath)	Safe

- TOP 7 Performance: Láska je tu s nami(Peter Nagy and Indigo)

=== Top 7 – Helena Vondráčková's Choice and Duets ===
Mentor: Helena Vondráčková

Order	Contestant	Song (original artist)	Result
1	Petr Ševčík	"You Can't Hurry Love" (Phil Collins)	Safe
2	Martin Harich	"Hard Day's Night" (The Beatles)	Safe
3	Gabriela Gunčíková	"Lásko má já stůňu" (Helena Vondráčková)	Safe
4	Lukáš Adamec	"It's Not Unusual" (Tom Jones)	Safe
5	Alžběta Kolečkářová	"A ty se ptáš co já" (Helena Vondráčková)	Eliminated
6	Martin Kurc	"Wake Me Up Before You Go-Go" (Wham!)	Eliminated
7	Michal Šeps	"Obchodník s deštěm" (Kryštof)	Safe
8	Michal Šeps & Alžběta Kolečkářová	"I Got You, Babe" (Sonny & Cher)	N/A
9	Petr Ševčík, Martin Harich & Martin Kurc	"All for Love" (Sting), (Bryan Adams)&(Rod Stewart)	N/A
10	Lukáš Adamec & Gabriela Gunčíková	"Cose della vita" (Eros Ramazzotti) & (Tina Turner)	N/A

=== Top 5 – Elán and Lucie ===
Order	Contestant	Song (original artist)	Result
1	Petr Ševčík	"Chci zas v tobě spát" (Lucie)	Eliminated
2	Martin Harich	"Šrouby do hlavy" (Lucie)	Safe
3	Gabriela Gunčíková	"Amerika" (Lucie)	Safe
4	Lukáš Adamec	"Oheň" (Lucie)	Safe
5	Michal Šeps	"Sen" (Lucie)	Safe
6	Petr Ševčík	"Neviem byť sám" (Elán)	Eliminated
7	Martin Harich	"Sestrička z Kramárov" (Elán)	Safe
8	Gabriela Gunčíková	"Čaba neblázni" (Elán)	Safe
9	Lukáš Adamec	"Zlodej slnečníc" (Elán)	Safe
10	Michal Šeps	"Kaskadér" (Elán)	Safe

=== Top 4 – ABBA and Queen ===
Order	Contestant	Song (original artist)	Result
1	Martin Harich	"Waterloo" (ABBA)	Eliminated
2	Gabriela Gunčíková	"Lay All Your Love On Me" (ABBA)	Safe
3	Lukáš Adamec	"SOS" (ABBA)	Safe
4	Michal Šeps	"Mamma Mia" (ABBA)	Safe
5	Martin Harich	"We Are the Champions" (Queen)	Eliminated
6	Gabriela Gunčíková	"Who Wants to Live Forever" (Queen)	Safe
7	Lukáš Adamec	"Somebody To Love" (Queen)	Safe
8	Michal Šeps	"Mustapha" (Queen)	Safe

- TOP 4 Performance: Dancing Queen (ABBA) and We Will Rock You (Queen)

=== Top 3 – Miroslav Žbirka, Judges' Choice, Idol's Choice ===
Mentor: Miroslav Žbirka

Order	Contestant	Song (original artist)	Result
1	Gabriela Gunčíková	"Atlantída" (Miroslav Žbirka)	Safe
2	Lukáš Adamec	"Balada o poľných vtákoch" (Miroslav Žbirka)	Safe
3	Michal Šeps	"Dr. Jekyll Mr. Hyde" (Miroslav Žbirka)	Eliminated
4	Gabriela Gunčíková	"Listen to Your Heart" (Roxette)	Safe
5	Lukáš Adamec	"Nothing Else Matters" (Metallica)	Safe
6	Michal Šeps	"Englishman in New York" (The Police)	Eliminated
7	Gabriela Gunčíková	"We Don't Need Another Hero" (Tina Turner)	Safe
8	Lukáš Adamec	"Best of You" (Foo Fighters)	Safe
9	Michal Šeps	"Roots Rock Reggae" (Bob Marley)	Eliminated

=== Top 2 – Finale ===
Order	Contestant	Song (original artist)	Result
1	Gabriela Gunčíková	"Livin' on a Prayer" (Jon Bon Jovi)	Runner-up
2	Lukáš Adamec	"By the Way" (Red Hot Chili Peppers)	Winner
3	Gabriela Gunčíková	"Jednoho dne se vrátíš" (Věra Špinarová)	Runner-up
4	Lukáš Adamec	"Two Princies" (Spin Doctors)	Winner
5	Gabriela Gunčíková	"Final Countdown" (Europe)	Runner-up
6	Lukáš Adamec	"Nepriznaná" (Václav Patejdl)	Winner
7	Lukáš Adamec & Gabriela Gunčíková	"You're The One That I Want" (Grease)	N/A

- TOP 12 Performance: Let Me Entertain You (Robbie Williams)

== Elimination chart ==
Legend
Female	Male	Top 24	Top 12	Winner

Safe	Safe First	Safe Last	Eliminated

Stage:		Semi Finals			Finals								
Week:		3/21	3/28	4/4	4/11	4/18	4/25	5/2	5/9	5/16	5/23	5/30	6/5
Place	Contestant	Result											
1	Lukáš Adamec	Safe	Safe	Safe	Safe	Safe	Safe	Safe	Safe	Safe	Safe	Safe	Winner
2	Gabriela Gunčíková	Safe	Safe	Safe	Safe	Safe	Safe	Safe	Safe	Safe	Safe	Safe	Runner-up
3	Michal Šeps	Safe	Safe	Safe	Safe	Safe	Safe	Safe	Safe	Safe	Safe	Eliminated	
4	Martin Harich	Safe	Safe	Safe	Safe	Safe	Safe	Saved	Safe	Safe	Eliminated		
5	Petr Ševčík	Safe	Safe	Safe	Safe	Safe	Safe	Safe	Safe	Eliminated			
6-7	Martin Kurc	Safe	Safe	Safe	Safe	Safe	Safe	Safe	Eliminated				
6-7	Alžběta Kolečkáŕová	Safe	Safe	Safe	Safe	Safe	Safe	Safe	Eliminated				
8	Simona Fecková	Safe	Safe	Safe	Safe	Safe	Eliminated						
9-10	Matej Piňák	Safe	Safe	Safe	Safe	Eliminated							
9-10	Celeste Buckingham	Safe	Safe	Safe	Safe	Eliminated							
11-12	Monika Povýšilová	Safe	Safe	Safe	Eliminated								
11-12	Klaudia Pappová	Safe	Safe	Safe	Eliminated								
13-16	Aneta Salačová	Safe	Safe	Eliminated									
13-16	Jerguš Oravec	Safe	Safe	Eliminated									
13-16	Noah Scott Ellenwood	Safe	Safe	Eliminated									
13-16	Alexandra Vokáliková	Safe	Safe	Eliminated									
17-20	} Lukáš Ondruš	Safe	Eliminated										
17-20	Sára Milfajtová	Safe	Eliminated										
17-20	Tomáš Jurenka	Safe	Eliminated										
17-20	Dorota Dragulová	Safe	Eliminated										
21-24	Jana Karasová	Eliminated											
21-24	Marcel Dragúň	Eliminated											
21-24	Petra Huliaková	Eliminated											
21-24	Jan Ráček	Eliminated											

== Contestants who appeared on other seasons/shows ==
- Petr Ševčík was a contestant from Česko Slovenská Superstar 2009 where he was eliminated in Divadlo round.

== See also ==
- Česko Slovenská SuperStar: Výběr finálových hitů (soundtrack album)
