= Don't Look Back (Celeste Buckingham album) =

Studio album by Celeste Buckingham
- Released: April 3, 2012 (SK, CD); April 20, 2012 (CZ, CD); May 14, 2012 (Download)
- Recorded: 2011–2012 at LittleBeat, Bratislava, SK
- Genre: Pop, electronic, R&B, soul
- Length: 36:24
- Label: CB/EMI (#669 135 2)
- Producer: Celeste Buckingham, Andrej Hruška, Martin Šrámek

Celeste Buckingham chronology
Nový človek (2011)	Don't Look Back (2012)	Where I Belong (2013)

Singles from Don't Look Back
- 1. "Blue Guitar" Released: July 20, 2011; 2. "Nobody Knows" Released: November 7, 2011; 3. "Run Run Run" Released: April 4, 2012

Compact disc

Don't Look Back is the debut album by Slovak-based recording artist Celeste Buckingham, released on April 3, 2012 through a distribution by EMI Records.

== Reception ==
=== Critical response ===
Professional ratings
Review scores
Source	Rating
REPORT	6/7
MusicServer.cz	8/10
Hudba.sk	(favorable)
FutureHits.cz	8/10
Koule.cz	75/100

Don't Look Back received very favorable reviews from music critics. The REPORT magazine praised the album as "one of the best debut records that has ever been released by the finalists of any local talent contest". Complimenting young artist for "having surpassed all fellow singers of her own", Daniel Maršalík attributed much of "Buckingham's allure" to her ability to see beyond the horizons of her homebase in the first place. Beside the album's anthem "Run Run Run and its titular ballad, he would find the most aspiring up-tempo tracks, namely "Hello Stranger", "Bleeding" and "Blue Guitar". Giving the set six (out of seven) points, he only reproached the Slovak cut "Mám ťa málo", respectively the spoken intro of "Stupid Love Games", both of which he saw "disturbing to no purpose".

In a review published in the online newspaper MusicServer.cz, Honza Balušek introduced the product as "a fresh and brilliant record", continuing further: "However unbelievable, (at the time of recording) sixteen-year-old Celeste Buckingham is on the absolute top of the best SuperStar's finalists... Wow!" Despite noting the broad genre influences, such as e.g. Adele, Dido, Rihanna and Katy Perry, the columnist stressed Buckingham's skills as a sovereign composer. Except for the opening tune "Nobody Knows", reportedly disliked due to "[its] wrecked rhythm", he felt all of the album's tracks as "radio-friendly hits." Among other, he lauded "Run Run Run" as his favorite and, especially, the singer's duet "Heart" featuring Noah Ellenwood. Unlike Maršalík of the REPORT, he saw also a potential in her collaboration with Martin Harich, describing their result ("Mám ťa málo") to sound "like the best in the Slovak classic pop" music. Eventually, he graded the album with eight points (out of ten in total).

=== Chart performance ===
On July 26, 2012, the album entered the Top 50 Prodejní, a chart effective for both countries Czech Republic and Slovakia, debuting at number forty. The following week, on August 3, 2012, the set topped its chart run at number thirty-seven. In total, the record would spend four weeks on the list.

== Track listing ==
No.	Title	Writer(s)	Featured artist(s)	Length
1.	"Nobody Knows"	Celeste Buckingham, Martin Šrámek, Andrej Hruška		3:47
2.	"Bleeding"	Celeste Buckingham		3:40
3.	"Don't Look Back"	Carmel Buckingham		3:58
4.	"Run Run Run"	Celeste Buckingham, Martin Šrámek, Andrej Hruška		3:42
5.	"Blue Guitar"	Celeste Buckingham, Martin Šrámek, Andrej Hruška		3:44
6.	"Mám ťa málo" (in Slovak)	Martin Harich	Martin Harich	3:38
7.	"Hello, Stranger"	Celeste Buckingham		3:05
8.	"Stupid Love Games"	Celeste Buckingham		3:18
9.	"Heart"	Celeste Buckingham	Noah Ellenwood	3:55
10.	"Gole Goldun" (in Iranian)			3:37
Total length:				36:24

== Credits and personnel ==
- Celeste Buckingham - lead vocalist, writer, lyrics, producer
- Andrej Hruška - writer, producer, guitar
- Martin Šrámek - writer, producer, keyboard
- Marián Slávka - drums
- Maťo Ivan - bass guitar
- Carmel Buckingham - writer
- Martin Harich - backing vocalist, writer
- Noah Scott Ellenwood - backing vocalist
- LittleBeat - recording studio
- EMI Czech Republic - distributor

== Charts ==
"Run Run Run"
Upon its release, the third single "Run Run Run" has received an instant airplay in both countries of the former Czech and Slovak Federal Republic.

Chart (2012)	Peak position
Czech Albums Chart	37

=== Singles ===
Year	Single	Peak positions			
Year	Single	SK		CZ	
Year	Single	50	100	50	100
2011	"Blue Guitar"	7	38	—	—
2011	"Nobody Knows"	4	48	7	28
2012	"Run Run Run"	1	2	1	2

== Release history ==
Region(s)	Date(s)	Format(s)	Edition
Slovakia	April 3, 2012	CD	Standard
Czech Republic	April 20, 2012	CD	Standard
Europe	May 14, 2012	Download	Standard

== See also ==
- Celeste Buckingham discography
- The 100 Greatest Slovak Albums of All Time
