= Česko Slovenská SuperStar: Výběr finálových hitů =

Soundtrack album by Various artists
- Released: May 9, 2011 (CD); May 16, 2011 (Download)
- Recorded: 2011
- Genre: Pop, rock, R&B, soul
- Length: 43:10
- Label: Universal (#277 310 2)
- Producer: TV Nova, Markíza

Celeste Buckingham chronology
Česko Slovenská SuperStar (2011)	Nový človek (2011)

Singles from Výběr finálových hitů
- 1. "Nevzdávám" Released: April 22, 2011

Alternative cover
- Slidepack edition

Česko Slovenská SuperStar: Výběr finálových hitů is the soundtrack album from the second season of the talent contest Česko Slovenská SuperStar, released by Universal. It contains one cover song from each of the top ten finalists of the TV show, and one ensemble track performed by the top twelve contestants.

The compilation was preceded by the single "Nevzdávám", issued through iTunes on April 22, 2011. As such, the track peaked at number twenty-four on the Slovak radio component chart and at number forty-two on the fellow airplay-list in Czech Republic.

== Track listing ==
No.	Title	Writer(s)	Performer(s)	Length
1.	"Nevzdávám" (in Czech and Slovak)	Tomáš Zubák, Václav Pokorný, Peter Graus, Marián Kachút	Ensemble	4:05
2.	"Are You Gonna Go My Way" (by Lenny Kravitz)	Lenny Kravitz, Craig Ross	Lukáš Adamec	3:35
3.	"Cry Baby" (by Janis Joplin)	Bert Berns, Jerry Ragovoy	Alžběta Kolečkářová	3:44
4.	"I Shot the Sheriff" (by Bob Marley)	Bob Marley	Michal Šeps	4:23
5.	"Come Undone" (by Robbie Williams)	Robbie Williams, Ashley Hamilton, Boots Ottestad, Daniel Pierre	Martin Harich	4:29
6.	"U + Ur Hand" (by Pink)	Pink, Max Martin, Dr. Luke, Rami Yacoub	Gabriela Gunčíková	3:36
7.	"Heaven" (by Bryan Adams)	Bryan Adams, Jim Vallance	Martin Kurc	3:57
8.	"When I Look at You" (by Miley Cyrus)	Hillary Lindsey, John Shanks	Simona Fecková	4:07
9.	"This Is the Last Time" (by Keane)	Tim Rice-Oxley, Tom Chaplin, Richard Hughes, James Sanger	Petr Ševčík	3:26
10.	"You Had Me" (by Joss Stone)	Joss Stone, Francis White, Wendy Stoker, Betty Wright	Celeste Buckingham	4:00
11.	"Virtual Insanity" (by Jamiroquai)	Jay Kay, Toby Smith	Matej Piňák	3:48
Total length:				43:10

== Credits and personnel ==
- Lukáš Adamec - lead vocalist, backing vocalist
- Gabriela Gunčíková - lead vocalist, backing vocalist
- Michal Šeps - lead vocalist, backing vocalist
- Martin Harich - lead vocalist, backing vocalist
- Petr Ševčík - lead vocalist, backing vocalist
- Martin Kurc - lead vocalist, backing vocalist
- Alžběta Kolečkářová - lead vocalist, backing vocalist
- Simona Fecková - lead vocalist, backing vocalist
- Matej Piňák - lead vocalist, backing vocalist
- Celeste Buckingham - lead vocalist, backing vocalist
- Monika Povýšilová - lead vocalist, backing vocalist
- Klaudia Pappová - lead vocalist, backing vocalist
- Tomáš Zubák - writer, producer
- Václav Pokorný - writer, producer
- Peter Graus - writer, producer
- Marián Kachút - writer, producer
- TV Nova - executive producer
- Markíza - executive producer
- Universal - distributor

== Charts ==
=== Peak positions ===
Chart (2011)	Peak position
Czech Albums Chart	16

=== Singles ===
Year	Single	Peak positions			
Year	Single	SK		CZ	
Year	Single	50	100	50	100
2011	"Nevzdávám" with VA	24	—	42	—

== Release history ==
Region(s)	Date(s)	Format(s)	Edition(s)
Slovakia/Czech Republic	May 9, 2011	CD	Standard + slide-pack
Slovakia/Czech Republic	May 16, 2011	Download	Standard + slide-pack

== See also ==
- Celeste Buckingham discography
- The 100 Greatest Slovak Albums of All Time
