= Nobody Knows (Celeste Buckingham song) =

Single by Celeste Buckingham

from the album Don't Look Back
- Released: November 7, 2011
- Recorded: 2011
- Studio: LittleBeat, Bratislava, Slovakia
- Genre: R&B, electronic, soul
- Length: 4:01
- Label: F84/CB/UMG
- Songwriter(s): Celeste Buckingham, Andrej Hruška, Martin Šrámek
- Producer(s): Celeste Buckingham, Andrej Hruška, Martin Šrámek

Celeste Buckingham singles chronology
"Blue Guitar" (2011)	"Nobody Knows" (2011)	"Ja a ty" (2012)

Audio sample
- file; help

Music video
- "Nobody Knows" on YouTube

"Nobody Knows" is a 2011 song by Slovak recording artist Celeste Buckingham, distributed by Universal. Co-written and co-produced by herself along with Andrej Hruška and Martin Šrámek, it was pre-released on November 7, 2011 as the second forerunner of the singer's then upcoming studio album Don't Look Back (2012), which followed a few months later.

Initially, the composition was specifically designed for the one-off compilation F84 (2011), performed by a number of her fellow recording artists, which as the first such collaborative effort in its country of origin helped raise awareness of those with autism. In addition to, the song was attached to her own full-length output, appearing as the album's opener, too.

In favor being more unconventional and electronic, the work was a radical change in comparison to her previously established sound as evident on "Blue Guitar". Unlike its predecessor, "Nobody Knows" presented a downbeat R&B-oriented sound featuring elements including trip hop, electronica and some of techno riffs. Lyrically, the song deals with issues related to darkness, loneliness and despair.

As such, the final result received from mixed to positive reviews from music journalists with most of them criticizing its presence on the singer's debut set. Nonetheless, the song did enjoy a considerable success becoming a radio "favorite" in both territories. While in her homebase country it achieved a top-five status within domestic outputs (at number four), on the similar component chart effective for Czech Republic the single reached at number seven; making it the Buckingham's first charter.

The song's accompanying music video directed by Braňo Vincze, was premiered on the local music channel MTV on March 1, 2012.

== Background ==
"I wrote the song because I was addressed by my producers Martin Šrámek and Andy Hruška, if I would contribute for a charitable project named as F84. I would not hesitate for a single moment."

As disclosed by the producers Martin Šrámek and Andrej Hruška of the LittleBeat studio — both recognized as her regular tandem —, Buckingham was offered a chance to write a composition in support of children and adults affected by the symptoms of autism. The song was to appear on a scheduled compilation that would serve as a fund-raising tool for awareness efforts of the disability. Featuring also vocal contributions by additional Slovak artists (such as e.g. Pavol Hammel), the release itself would be named after the so-called F84 syndrome, known as one of disorders of psychological development. Accepting the offer, the singer provided lyrics entitled "Nobody Knows", and under a supervision of Šrámek—Hruška she developed also a music. The result eventually became the opening tune of the themed compilation, which was sold online through the shopping website of the corresponding foundation www.shop.f84.sk.

== Critical reception ==
Following the song's inclusion on the album Don't Look Back (2012), its critical opinion varied by a source. Daniel Maršalík from the lead local music magazine REPORT as well Jana Moravcová of Koule.cz, they both acknowledged the single's airplay success. Yet they saw the composition as either one of the Buckingham's "least catchy" as written in the Maršalík's review, or "one of [her] weakiest songs" per Moravcová herself. She would explain her judgement further: "In contrast to the rest, it works too roughly and its R&B flow misfits the pop concept of [her] album."

Honza Balušek writing for the online newspaper MusicServer.cz, refused the result for a change, calling it "[her] most weird [song]" reportedly due to its "broken rhythm". The editor, though, admitted the song's potential in the underground circuit. Štěpán Strejček of the FutureHits celebrated the result as "very modern track", actually adding: "For my part, there is nothing at all to reproach [it]." While Michaela Žureková from the Slovak web devoted to music Hudba gave a positive rating, too, quoting: "...even an acoustic spirit of songs fits Celeste, which she demonstrates for example on the first single, a really strong, though not that much fitting song".

== Music video ==
As one of the producers, Martin Šrámek, confirmed for Aktuality, the song was originally written exclusively for purposes of the charitable projectF84. The production of the music video therefore was not planned. After a heavy rotation of the song on the music radio stations, the producers changed their mind and decided to proceed also with a visual presentation. The video directed by Braňo Vincze of the Kuul Fabrik company.

Singer commented making the work for the local press as much demanding: "It was my first real videoclip. We were shooting about thirteen hours, and after filming I was rushing to my prom." Apart from her younger sister Carmel, in a number of scenes also both co-writers and producers of the song Martin Šrámek and Andrej Hruška appeared in the video. "I believe they had fun in front of the cameras," said Buckingham for Aktuality. The video premiered on March 1, 2012 on the MTV. The local media rated the visual work featuring special effects original, extravagant and futuristic, respectively.

- Director: Braňo Vincze
- Production company: Kuul Fabrik

== Credits and personnel ==
- Celeste Buckingham - lead vocalist, writer, lyrics, producer, publisher
- Andrej Hruška - writer, producer, guitar
- Martin Šrámek - writer, producer, keyboard
- LittleBeat - recording studio
- EMI Czech Republic - distributor

== Track listing ==
1. "Nobody Knows" (Album version) — 4:01

== Charts ==
Chart (2012)	Peak position
Slovak Hot 50 (Rádio SK 50 Oficiálna)	4
Czech Hot 50 (Rádio CZ 50 Oficiální)	7
Czech Top 100 (Rádio Top 100 Oficiální)	28
Slovak Top 100 (Rádio Top 100 Oficiálna)	48
