= Amo (band) =

Slovak rap-reggae band

AMO
- Origin: Bratislava, Slovakia
- Genres: Rap, reggae, dancehall
- Years active: 2003–present
- Labels: Universal Music, G.A. Records
- Members: Opak, Moe, Viktor Hazard

AMO is a Slovak band, active since 2003.

== Discography ==
Studio albums

- 2005: Original (Universal)
- 2007: Family biznis (Universal)
- 2011: Positive G.A. Records
- 2013: Rok Nula

Singles

- 2012: "Swing" with Celeste Buckingham

== Awards ==
Year	Nominated work	Award	Category	Result
2006	Themselves	Slávik Awards	Band of the Year	#46
2007	Themselves	Slávik Awards	Band of the Year	#41
2012	Themselves	Slávik Awards	Band of the Year	#17
