= Swing (AMO song) =

Single by AMO and Celeste Buckingham
- Released: June 5, 2012
- Recorded: 2012
- Genre: Hip hop, swing, dancehall
- Length: 2:54
- Label: G.A.
- Songwriter(s): Opak, Moe, Celeste Buckingham
- Producer(s): Opak, Marcel Vén

Celeste Buckingham singles chronology
"Run Run Run" (2012)	"Swing" (2012)	"Never Be You" (2012)

Audio sample
- file; help

Music video
- "Swing (single version)" on YouTube

"Swing" is a 2012 song by Slovak hip hop band AMO. While the original version of the composition was released on the group's studio album Positive (2011), its single version with featuring a vocal contribution by Celeste Buckingham, sung in English, was issued on June 5, 2012.

The single peaked at number five on the component Rádio SK 50 Oficiálna and at number forty-six on the Rádio Top 100 Oficiálna, respectively. The accompanying music video directed Martin Hudák.

== Credits and personnel ==
- Opak - lead vocalist, writer, producer
- Moe - writer
- Celeste Buckingham - backing vocalist, writer
- Marcel Vén - producer

== Track listings ==
1. "Swing" (Album version) — 3:42
2. "Swing" (Single version) featuring Celeste Buckingham — 3:42

== Charts ==
Chart (2012)	Peak position
Slovak Hot 50 (Rádio SK 50 Oficiálna)	5
Slovak Top 100 (Rádio Top 100 Oficiálna)	46
