= Nevzdávám =

Single by Various artists

from the album Česko Slovenská SuperStar: Výběr finálových hitů
- Released: April 22, 2011
- Recorded: 2011
- Genre: Pop
- Length: 4:05
- Label: Universal Music
- Songwriter(s): Tomáš Zubák; Václav Pokorný; Peter Graus; Marián Kachút
- Producer(s): TV Nova; Markíza

Celeste Buckingham singles chronology
"Nevzdávám" (2011)	"Blue Guitar" (2011)

Audio sample
- file; help

Music video
- "Nevzdávám" (live) on YouTube

"Nevzdávám" ("Ain't Giving Up") is a 2011 song by the top twelve finalists of the second season of the Czech and Slovak talent show, Česko Slovenská Superstar. Issued on April 22, 2011 by Universal Music, the composition was written by Tomáš Zubák, Václav Pokorný, Peter Graus and Marián Kachút as the main theme of the series.

The track released on the soundtrack album Česko Slovenská SuperStar: Výběr finálových hitů, it peaked at number twenty-four on the Slovak radio component chart and at number forty-two on the fellow airplay-list in Czech Republic.

== Credits and personnel ==
- Lukáš Adamec - lead vocalist, backing vocalist
- Celeste Buckingham - lead vocalist, backing vocalist
- Simona Fecková - lead vocalist, backing vocalist
- Gabriela Gunčíková - lead vocalist, backing vocalist
- Martin Harich - lead vocalist, backing vocalist
- Alžběta Kolečkářová - lead vocalist, backing vocalist
- Martin Kurc - lead vocalist, backing vocalist
- Klaudia Pappová - lead vocalist, backing vocalist
- Matej Piňák - lead vocalist, backing vocalist
- Monika Povýšilová - lead vocalist, backing vocalist
- Michal Šeps - lead vocalist, backing vocalist
- Petr Ševčík - lead vocalist, backing vocalist
- Tomáš Zubák - writer
- Václav Pokorný - writer
- Peter Graus - writer
- Marián Kachút - writer
- TV Nova - executive producer
- Markíza - executive producer
- Universal - distributor

== Track listings ==
1. "Nevzdávám" (Album version) — 4:05

== Charts ==
Chart (2011)	Peak position
Czech Hot 50 (Rádio CZ 50 Oficiální)	42
Slovak Hot 50 (Rádio SK 50 Oficiálna)	24
