= Nie som tu náhodou =

Studio album by Majk Spirit
- Released: December 7, 2018
- Studio: Starmusic, Bratislava
- Genre: Hip hop
- Length: 73:45
- Language: Slovak
- Label: Spirit Entertainment
- Producer: Majk Spirit; Roman Zámožný; Grimaso; Abe; Special Beatz

Majk Spirit chronology
Y White / Y Black (2015)	Nie som tu náhodou (2018)

Nie som tu náhodou (English: I'm Not Here by Accident) is the third studio album by Slovak rapper Majk Spirit, released on December 7, 2018, through Spirit Entertainment. The album contains 18 tracks were made with 16 different producers. Majk Spirit embarked on a tour in support of the album, beginning in March 2019 in Prague.

It was supported by the single "Spokojný". The title track is a collaboration with Slovak singer Richard Müller; a music video directed by Roland Wranik was also made for the song. The album reached number four in Slovakia.

== Background ==
On the album's sound, Majk Spirit affirmed: "I don't like albums that make you feel like you're going through an album, and you've got twelve music styles in 13 songs and then [you] just ask yourself: 'What's that guy doing? [Does he] just want to engage all listeners?'" Despite clarifying that Majk Spirit wanted "different emotions" in each song, he wanted them to feature a coherent theme.

Regarding his collaboration with Richard Müller, Majk Spirit said: "Richard is a legend that I really appreciate [...] I was just planning to use the intro of his song Kristove roky [Christ Years]. I liked it, I decided to try it with this single. I think the result is great, at least I am really happy." Müller stated that he was unsure upon first recording the song, as his voice featured prominently in the mix, but was pleased when he heard the final recording. Of the resulting mix of the two artists' genres, he said: "Young people know what they are doing and, above all, how they should do it. Hip hop is a legitimate genre, just like pop, jazz, rock or anything else. I don't see why [our] genres shouldn't be connected."

== Critical reception ==
Several critics noted that Nie som tu náhodou is Majk Spirit's "most courageous" of his career thus far. The staff of Zoznam.sk called the title track "Nie som tu náhodou" a "high-quality, musically-crafted single with a philosophical message" in its lyrics.

== Track listing ==
No.	Title	Length
1.	"Trinity"	3:33
2.	"Spokojný"	3:44
3.	"Trochu lásky"	3:18
4.	"Žiariš" (featuring VeronikaS)	3:33
5.	"Impresie"	3:51
6.	"Nikto iný"	3:33
7.	"Kairos" (featuring Monika Bagárová)	3:24
8.	"Baby"	3:53
9.	"Michael"	3:14
10.	"Hic/Finesy/Hype/Haleluja"	8:11
11.	"Karel/Fialové mosty"	5:23
12.	"Len človek"	4:06
13.	"Zenit" (featuring Anita Soul)	3:29
14.	"Dar" (featuring Matěj Vávra)	3:03
15.	"Robím čo môžem" (featuring MadSkill)	3:57
16.	"Virgo"	3:27
17.	"33" (featuring VeronikaS)	5:57
18.	"Nie som tu náhodou" (featuring Richard Müller)	4:09
Total length:		73:45

== Charts ==
Chart (2018–19)	Peak position
Czech Albums (ČNS IFPI)	32
Slovak Albums (ČNS IFPI)	4
