= Ja a ty =

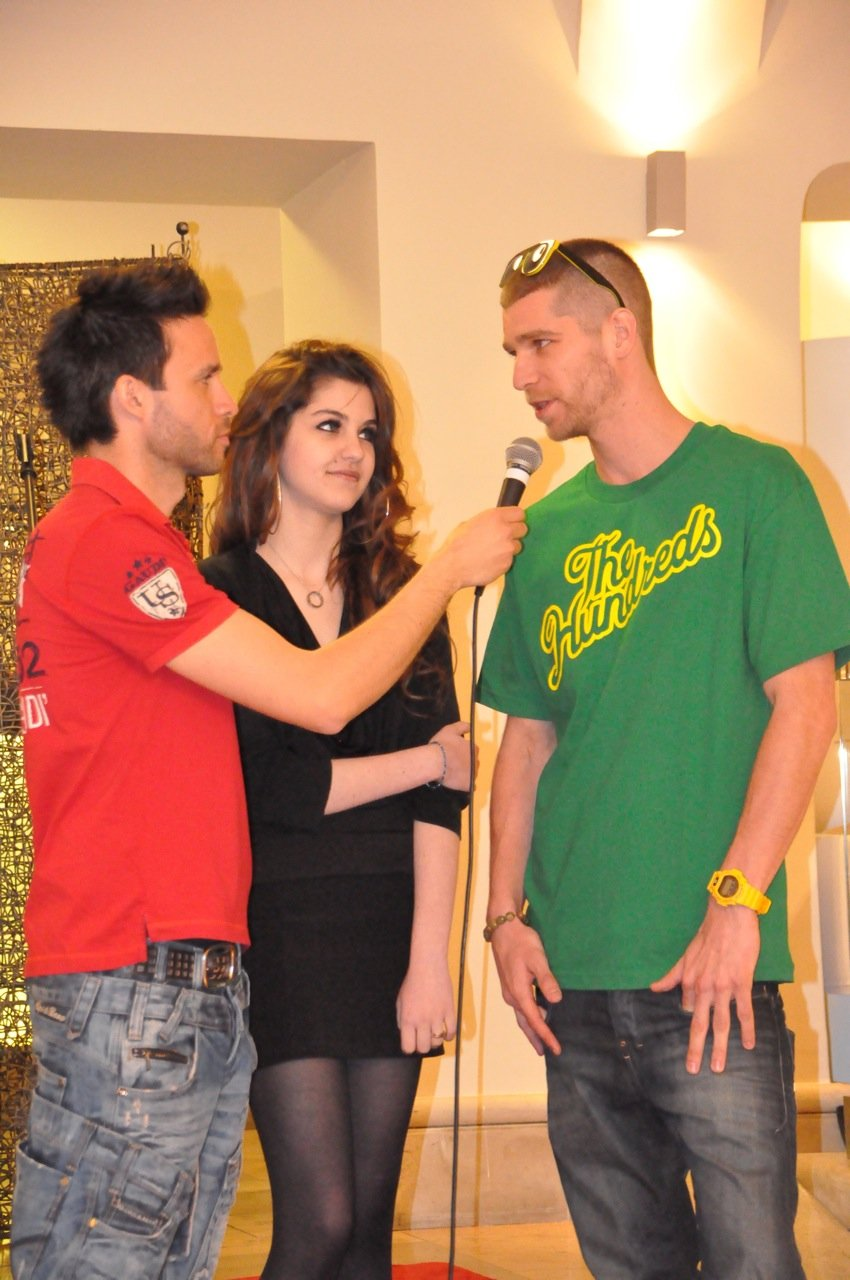
- Artists interviewed at the launch ceremony of Don't Look Back album on May 29, 2012 in Prague.

Single by Majk Spirit featuring Celeste Buckingham

from the album Nový človek
- Released: February 14, 2012
- Recorded: 2011
- Genre: Hip hop, pop, soul
- Length: 2:51
- Label: BeatBan
- Songwriter(s): Majk Spirit, Celeste Buckingham
- Producer(s): Grimaso

Celeste Buckingham singles chronology
"Nobody Knows" (2011)	"Ja a ty" (2012)	"Run Run Run" (2012)

Audio sample
- file; help

Music video
- "Ja a ty" on YouTube

"Ja a ty" ("Me and You" in English) is a 2011 song by Majk Spirit and Celeste Buckingham. As the first music collaboration of the Slovak recording artists, their common duet was released on Valentine's Day, February 14, 2012. Prior to that, the single was issued on the rapper's own studio album entitled Nový človek (2011), distributed by BeatBan Records.

The song charted at number forty-eight on the SK Top 100, while at number four on the local component airplay list, and its official music video was produced by DJ Lowa and Drahouš Lysák. In 2013, both artists worked together back again on a track called "I Was Wrong".

== Credits and personnel ==
- Majk Spirit - lead vocalist, writer
- Celeste Buckingham - lead vocalist, writer
- Grimaso - producer
- Michal Matejovič - media management
- FatMusic Studio - recording studio
- BeatBan Records - record label, distributor
- Spirit Music - copyright
- OnStage Ltd. - distributor

== Track listings ==
1. "Ja a ty" (Album version) — 2:51

== Charts ==
Chart (2012)	Peak position
Slovak Top 100 (Rádio Top 100 Oficiálna)	48
Slovak Hot 50 (Rádio SK 50 Oficiálna)	4
