= List of number-one songs of the 2000s (Czech Republic) =

Rádio Top 100 Oficiální is the official chart of the top ranking songs as based on airplay in the Czech Republic, compiled and published weekly by IFPI Czech Republic.

From 2003 through 2010, the song that spend the most weeks at number one was "Say It Right" by Nelly Furtado. The artist with the most number ones during that time frame was Chinaski with five.

== Number-one songs ==
Issue date	Artist	Song	Weeks at number one
2002
July 1	Lucie	"Daniela"	8
August 26	Shakira	"Underneath Your Clothes"	1
September 2	Bryan Adams	"Here I Am"	1
September 9	Enrique Iglesias	"Love To See You Cry"	1
September 16	Céline Dion	"I´m Alive"	2
September 30	Chinaski	"Můj svět"	4+
November 25	Kryštof	"Obchodník s deštěm"	5
December 30	Robbie Williams	"Feel"	10
2003
February 24	Atomic Kitten	"The Last Goodbye"	2
March 10	Céline Dion	"I Drove All Night"	6
May 5	Kryštof	"Tramvaje"	1
May 12	Mig 21 (band)	"Malotraktorem"	1
May 19	Céline Dion	"I Drove All Night"	3
June 9	Chinaski	"Dobrák od kosti"	4
July 7	Lucie Bílá	"eSeMeS"	5
August 11	DJ BoBo	"Chihuahua"	3
September 1	Dido	"White Flag"	13
December 1	Chinaski	"1970"	3
December 22	Dido	"White Flag"	2
2004
January 5	Chinaski	"1970"	8
March 1	Westlife	"Mandy"	2
March 15	The Black Eyed Peas	"Shut Up"	1
March 22	Outkast	"Hey Ya!"	1
March 29	No Doubt	"It's My Life"	2
April 12	Limp Bizkit	"Behind Blue Eyes"	5
May 17	Jamelia	"Superstar"	1
May 24	Anastacia	"Left Outside Alone"	1
May 31	Limp Bizkit	"Behind Blue Eyes"	3
June 21	Anastacia	"Left Outside Alone"	2
July 5	Eamon	"Fuck It (I Don't Want You Back)"	2
July 19	Anastacia	"Left Outside Alone"	1
July 26	Eamon	"Fuck It (I Don't Want You Back)"	2
August 2	Aneta Langerová	"Letím ke hvězdám"	1
August 9	Eamon	"Fuck It (I Don't Want You Back)"	2
August 23	Maroon 5	"This Love"	9
October 25	Anastacia	"Sick and Tired"	6
December 13	Support Lesbiens	"Cliché"	2
December 27	Dan Bárta	"On My Head"	14
2005
April 18	Green Day	"Boulevard of Broken Dreams"	1
April 25	Arash	"Boro Boro"	2
May 9	Natasha Bedingfield	"Unwritten"	1
May 16	Green Day	"Boulevard of Broken Dreams"	2
May 30	The Pirates	"You Should Really Know"	2
June 13	Green Day	"Boulevard of Broken Dreams"	1
June 20	Global Deejays	"The Sound of San Francisco"	1
June 27	Daniel Powter	"Bad Day"	2
July 11	The Black Eyed Peas	"Don't Phunk with My Heart"	4
August 8	Daniel Powter	"Bad Day"	1
August 15	Akon	"Lonely"	1
August 22	Backstreet Boys	"Incomplete"	2
September 5	Chinaski	"Tabáček"	1
September 12	James Blunt	"You're Beautiful"	2
September 26	Green Day	"Wake Me Up When September Ends"	2
October 10	Chinaski	"Tabáček"	9
December 12	Juanes	"La Camisa Negra"	2
2006
January 3	Madonna	"Hung Up"	3
January 24	Juanes	"La Camisa Negra"	1
January 31	Madonna	"Hung Up	1
February 7	James Blunt	"Wisemen"	5
March 14	Helena Zeťová	"Impossible (Unstoppable)"	1
March 21	Bob Sinclar featuring Gary "Nesta" Pine	"Love Generation"	5
April 25	Ready Kirken	"1+1"	1
May 2	Bob Sinclar presents featuring Gary "Nesta" Pine	"Love Generation"	1
May 9	Ready Kirken	"1+1"	6
June 20	Shakira	"Hips Don't Lie"	2
July 4	Support Lesbiens	"English Stereo"	8
August 29	Flipsyde	"Happy Birthday"	3
September 19	Chinaski	"Vedouci"	1
September 26	Pink	"Who Knew"	2
October 10	Kryštof	"Rubikon"	1
October 17	Wanastowi Vjecy	"Otevřená Zlomenina"	1
October 24	Kryštof	"Rubikon"	2
November 7	PEHA	"Spomal"	1
November 14	Kryštof	"Rubikon"	1
November 21	Wanastowi Vjecy	"Otevřená Zlomenina"	2
December 5	PEHA	"Spomal"	9
2007
February 6	Divokej Bill	"Čmelák"	1
February 13	Pink	"U + Ur Hand"	5
March 20	Nelly Furtado	"All Good Things (Come to an End)"	7
May 8	Mika	"Relax, Take It Easy"	1
May 15	Kaiser Chiefs	"Ruby"	1
May 22	Nelly Furtado	"Say It Right"	17
September 18	Chinaski	"Zadarmo"	4
October 16	Fergie	"Big Girls Don't Cry"	1
October 23	Enrique Iglesias	"Do You Know? (The Ping Pong Song)"	2
November 6	Plain White T's	"Hey There Delilah"	3
November 27	Marquess	"Vayamos compañeros"	1
December 4	Plain White T's	"Hey There Delilah"	4
2008
January 15	Sugababes	"About You Now"	10
March 25	Colbie Caillat	"Bubbly"	7
May 13	Kryštof	"Atentát"	7
July 1	Lenny Kravitz	"I'll Be Waiting"	2
July 15	Morandi	"Angels"	4
August 12	Enrique Iglesias	"Can You Hear Me"	1
August 19	Sugababes	"Denial"	2
September 2	Enrique Iglesias	"Can You Hear Me"	3
September 23	Katarína Knechtová	"Muoj bože"	1
September 30	September	"Cry for You"	1
October 7	Katarína Knechtová	"Muoj bože"	3
October 28	Katy Perry	"I Kissed a Girl"	1
November 4	Coldplay	"Viva la Vida"	1
November 11	Shaun Baker	"Hey Hi Hello"	2
November 25	Guru Josh Project	"Infinity 2008"	1
December 2	Pink	"So What"	3
December 23	Amy Macdonald	"This Is the Life"	2
2009
January 6	Coldplay	"Viva la Vida"	3
January 27	Katy Perry	"Hot n Cold"	10
April 7	Pink	"Sober"	2
April 21	Morandi featuring Helene	"Save Me"	1
April 28	Pink	"Sober"	1
May 5	Alesha Dixon	"The Boy Does Nothing"	8
June 30	Michal Hrůza	"Napořád"	1
July 7	Alesha Dixon	"The Boy Does Nothing"	3
July 28	Lily Allen	"Not Fair"	2
August 11	Green Day	"Know Your Enemy"	1
August 18	The Black Eyed Peas	"I Gotta Feeling"	3
September 8	David Guetta featuring Kelly Rowland	"When Love Takes Over"	2
September 22	The Black Eyed Peas	"I Gotta Feeling"	1
September 29	David Guetta featuring Kelly Rowland	"When Love Takes Over"	2
October 13	The Black Eyed Peas	"I Gotta Feeling"	3
November 3	Lady Gaga	"Paparazzi"	2
November 17	David Guetta featuring Akon	"Sexy Chick"	1
November 24	Lady Gaga	"Paparazzi"	2
December 8	The Pussycat Dolls	"Hush Hush"	1
December 15	David Guetta featuring Akon	"Sexy Chick"	4

== See also ==
- 2000s in music
- List of number-one songs of the 2000s (Slovakia)
