= Never Be You (Celeste Buckingham song) =

Single by Celeste Buckingham

from the album Where I Belong
- Released: November 12, 2012
- Recorded: 2012
- Genre: Pop; rock; soul
- Length: 2:55
- Label: Artist release
- Songwriter(s): Celeste Buckingham; Martin Šrámek; Andrej Hruška; Aaron Harmon; Jordan Reyes; Paula Winger
- Producer(s): Martin Šrámek; Andrej Hruška

Celeste Buckingham singles chronology
"Swing" (2012)	"Never Be You" (2012)	"I Was Wrong" (2013)

Audio sample
- file; help

Music video
- "Never Be You" on YouTube

"Never Be You" is a 2012 song by Slovak recording artist Celeste Buckingham. Released on November 12 through iTunes, the track composed the singer along with Littlebeat producers Martin Šrámek—Andrej Hruška, and US-based musicians Aaron Harmon—Jordan Reyes, both from BoyGenius Studios. While the lyrics co-wrote Paula Winger, the music video directed by Roland Wraník was shot in a Slovak spa town, Trenčianske Teplice.

The single peaked at number forty-two on the CZ Top 100 airplay chart, and at number forty-seven on an equivalent SK playlist, Rádio Top 100 Oficiálna. Within the CZ component playlist, it charted at number nine.

== Development ==
Buckingham wrote the lyrics in July 2012, as her own dialogue between true self and false self, or else a new recording artist versus her alter ego, described as a potentially acclaimed but arrogant music star. In addition to, Paula Winger revised some of the verses.

== Credits and personnel ==
- Celeste Buckingham - lead vocalist, writer, lyricist, copyright
- Martin Šrámek - producer
- Andrej Hruška - producer
- Aaron Harmon - writer
- Jordan Reyes - writer
- Paula Winger - lyricist
- Littlebeat - recording studio
- BoyGenius Studios - recording studio, mastering

== Track listings ==
1. "Never Be You" (Original version) — 2:55

== Charts ==
Chart (2012)	Peak position
Slovak Top 100 (Rádio Top 100 Oficiálna)	47
Chart (2013)	Peak position
Czech Top 100 (Rádio Top 100 Oficiální)	42
Czech Hot 50 (Rádio CZ 50 Oficiální)	9
Czech Top 20 Music Videos on YouTube	9
