= The Lost Princess (Celeste and Carmel Buckingham book) =

2007 book by Celeste and Carmel Buckingham

- Author: Celeste and Carmel Buckingham
- Illustrator: Georgina Soar
- Language: English
- Genre: Children's literature
- Publisher: Divis-Slovakia
- Publication date: October 1, 2007
- Publication place: Slovakia
- Media type: Print: Paperback
- Pages: 69
- ISBN: 978-809-6935-45-1
- Dewey Decimal: 810

The Lost Princess is a children's picture book by Celeste and Carmel Buckingham, published on October 1, 2007 on Divis-Slovakia. It is accompanied with illustrations by Georgina Soar. The fairy tale utilizes elements of fantasy, adventure, and mystery fiction.

== Background ==
The book was Celeste Buckingham's first exposure to the public prior to her musical career, which began in 2011. The book describes the child authors as "sisters who were eleven and nine when they wrote this book. Both are Americans but live with their parents in the Slovak Republic. Celeste attends middle school and loves dancing, swimming, music and reading. Carmel is in the fifth grade and loves fairy-tales and reading".

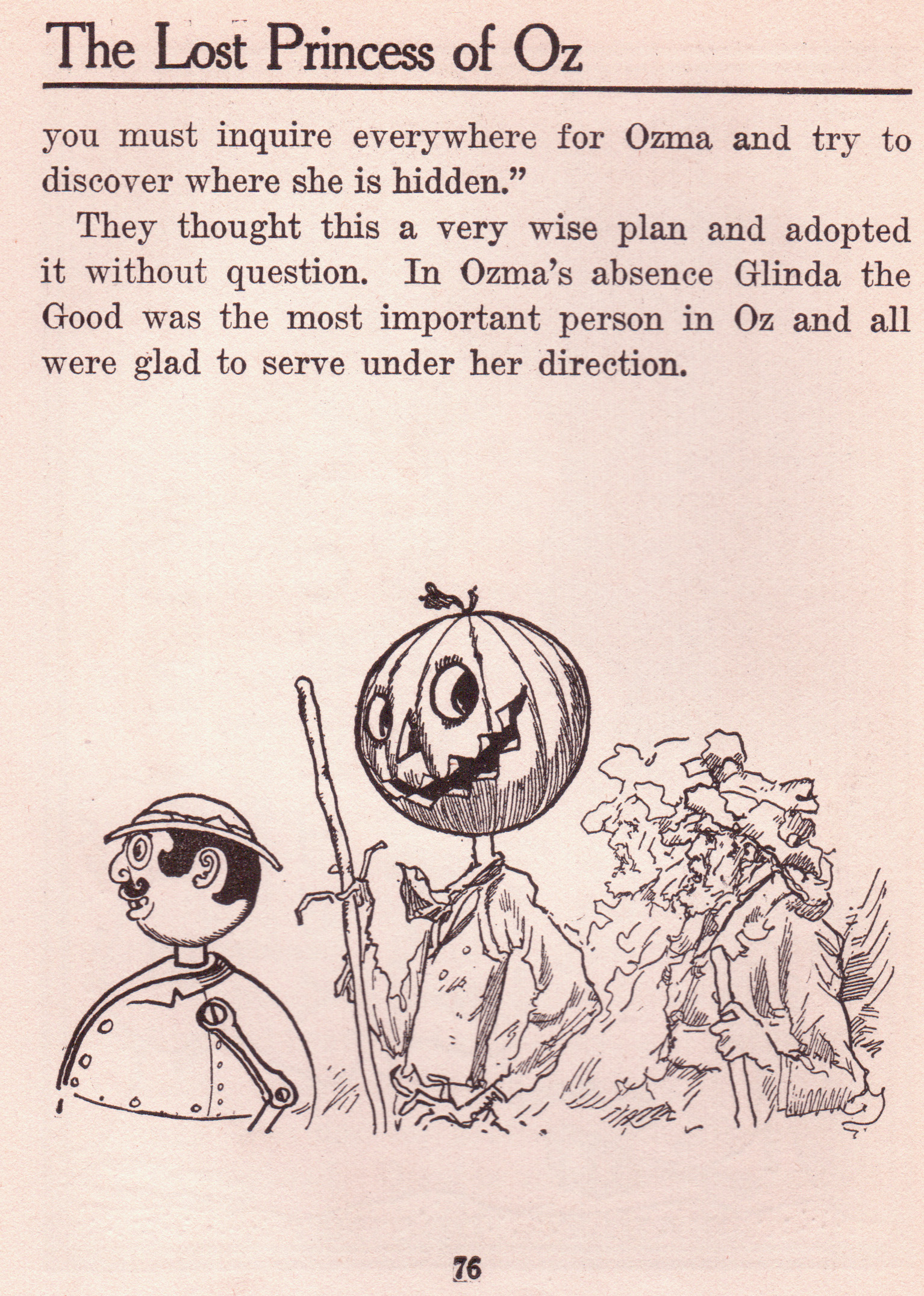
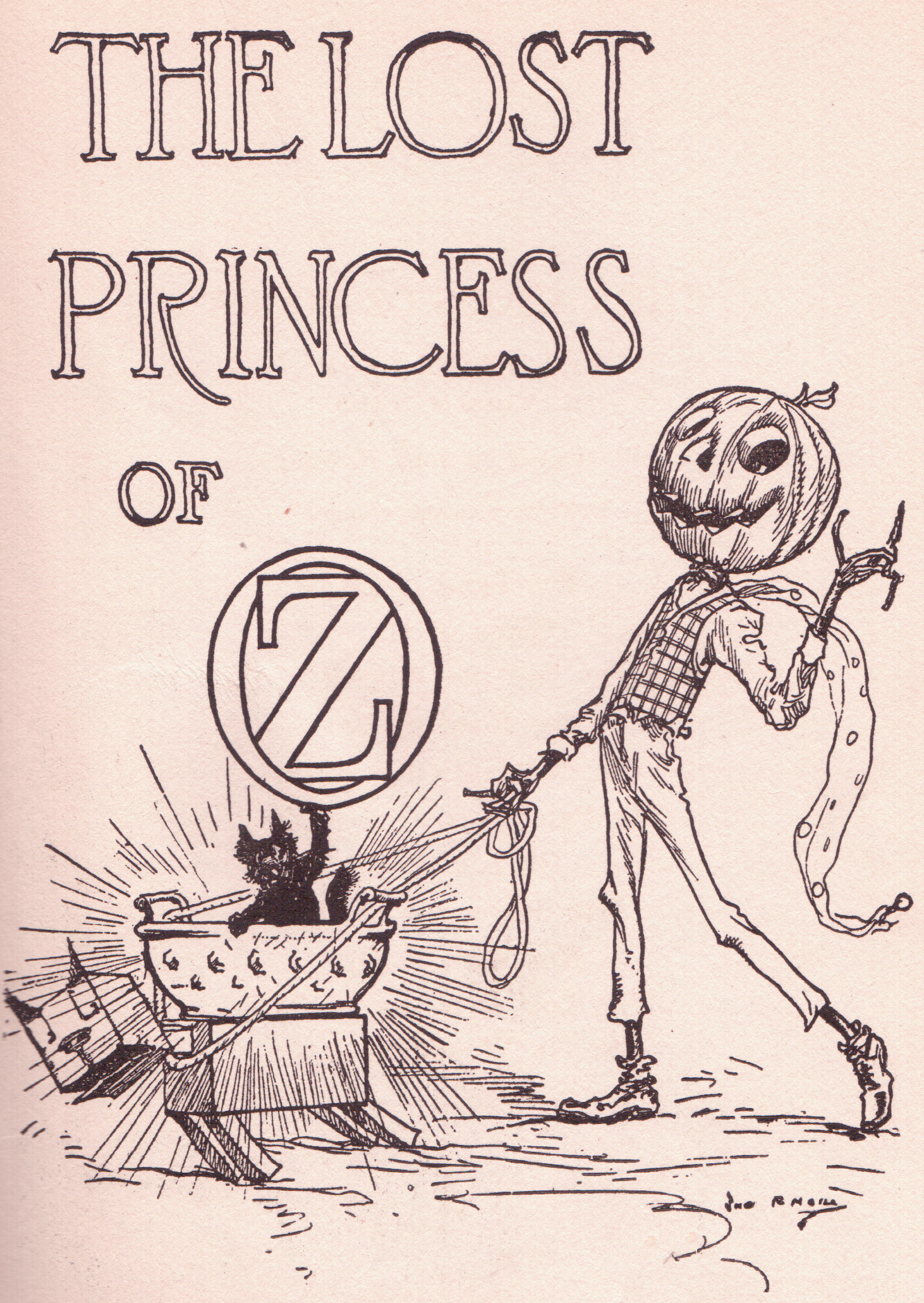
90 years after the release of the Baum's Lost Princess (1917) that featured twelve pen-and-ink drawings by John R. Neill, the sisters Buckingham revised the Oz book for their own output, illustrated by Georgina Soar.

The plot of the book in some ways bears a resemblance to the 11th canonical "Oz" book, The Lost Princess of Oz (1917).

== Plot ==
The books follows two sisters. The younger is kidnapped, and the older sister must find her and bring her back to the family.

== See also ==
- Fantasy literature
- List of Oz books
