= Blue Guitar (Celeste Buckingham song) =

Single by Celeste Buckingham

from the album Don't Look Back
- Released: July 20, 2011
- Recorded: 2011
- Genre: Pop, soul
- Length: 3:44
- Label: CB/EMI
- Songwriter(s): Celeste Buckingham, Andrej Hruška, Martin Šrámek
- Producer(s): Celeste Buckingham, Andrej Hruška, Martin Šrámek

Celeste Buckingham singles chronology
"Nevzdávám" (2011)	"Blue Guitar" (2011)	"Nobody Knows" (2011)

Audio sample
- file; help

"Blue Guitar" is a 2011 song by the Slovak recording artist Celeste Buckingham. Released on July 20, 2011, the composition wrote singer herself along with producers Andrej Hruška and Martin Šrámek. Upon its release on the corresponding album Don't Look Back, her debut single received positive reviews from music journalists.

== Critical reception ==
The composition received positive reviews from music critics. While reviewing the Buckingham's first studio album, Daniel Maršalík from the Czech REPORT commented the work: "Blue Guitar featuring a mid-tempo, it would not get lost on the music charts.". A similar opinion shared Jana Moravcová of Koule.cz, after ranking the "guitar song" amongst those that demonstrate a "hit potential."

== Credits and personnel ==
- Celeste Buckingham - lead vocalist, writer, producer, publisher
- Andrej Hruška - writer, producer, guitar
- Martin Šrámek - writer, producer, keyboard
- LittleBeat - recording studio
- EMI Czech Republic - distributor

== Track listings ==
1. "Blue Guitar" (Album version) — 3:44

== Charts ==
Chart (2011)	Peak position
Slovak Hot 50 (Rádio SK 50 Oficiálna)	7
Slovak Top 100 (Rádio Top 100 Oficiálna)	38
