= I Was Wrong (Celeste Buckingham and Majk Spirit song) =

Single by Celeste Buckingham and Majk Spirit

from the album Where I Belong
- Released: May 6, 2013
- Recorded: 2013
- Genre: Pop, soul
- Length: 3:58
- Label: Spirit MBA
- Songwriter(s): Martin Šrámek, Celeste Buckingham, Majk Spirit
- Producer(s): Andrej Hruška, Martin Šrámek, Filip Hittrich

Celeste Buckingham singles chronology
"Never Be You" (2012)	"I Was Wrong" (2013)	"Gone" (2013)

Audio sample
- file; help

Music video
- "I Was Wrong" on YouTube

"I Was Wrong" is a 2013 song by Celeste Buckingham and Majk Spirit, released through iTunes on May 6, 2013. Following the initial collaboration of both Slovak recording artists for a song called "Ja a ty" from 2012, their second duet was produced by Andrej Hruška and Martin Šrámek of Littlebeat studio.

The song charted at number two on the SK Top 100 topping the component airplay chart, respectively. In the Czech Republic, it reached at number seventeen on the CZ Top 100, while at number two on the CZ Hot 50. The music video directed by Jiří Marshal was shot in California, USA.

== Credits and personnel ==
- Celeste Buckingham - lead vocalist, writer, lyrics (in English)
- Majk Spirit - backing vocalist, lyrics (in Slovak)
- Martin Šrámek - writer, producer, programmer
- Andrej Hruška - post-production, programmer
- Filip Hittrich - post-production, programmer
- Matej Mikloš - piano
- Ľuboš Priehradník - mastering
- Littlebeat - recording studio
- Spirit MBA - record label, distributor

== Track listings ==
1. "I Was Wrong" (Original version) — 3:58

== Charts ==
Chart (2013)	Peak position
Czech Hot 50 (Rádio CZ 50 Oficiální)	2
Czech Top 100 (Rádio Top 100 Oficiální)	17
Slovak Hot 50 (Rádio SK 50 Oficiálna)	1
Slovak Top 100 (Rádio Top 100 Oficiálna)	2
