= Nový človek =

Studio album by Majk Spirit
- Released: November 5, 2011
- Recorded: 2011
- Studio: FatMusic Studio
- Genres: Hip hop, pop, R&B
- Length: 79:53
- Label: BeatBan

Singles from Nový človek
- 1. "Good vibration" Released: April 10, 2011; 2. "Sen" Released: 2011; 3. "Ja a ty" Released: February 14, 2012; 4. "Sexy" Released: 2012; 5. "Hľadám pravdu" Released: 2012

Compact disc design

Nový človek is the debut album by Slovak rapper Majk Spirit released on November 11, 2011 on BeatBan Records. During first six weeks upon its release, the set sold over 6,000 copies in both the Czech Republic and Slovakia.

== Track listing ==
All lyrics are written by Majk Spirit.

No.	Title	Featured artist(s)	Length
1.	"Som, aký som"		4:10
2.	"Počítaj so mnou"		3:49
3.	"Hip-Hop"		3:49
4.	"Sen"	Nironic	3:53
5.	"Good vibration"	MadSkill	3:53
6.	"Ženy treba ľúbiť"		4:16
7.	"Nebuď tragéd"	Orion	3:14
8.	"Free"	Delik	4:19
9.	"Ži a nechaj žiť"		4:05
10.	"Legendárna"	H16	3:48
11.	"Ja a ty"	Celeste Buckingham	2:51
12.	"Bič!"	Cigo	3:27
13.	"Sexy"		3:29
14.	"Všetkospoluhrá"	Supa	4:40
15.	"Jazvy"		4:43
16.	"Hviezdy"		4:27
17.	"Hľadám pravdu"		3:44
18.	"Babylon horí"	DNA & Suvereno	4:23
19.	"Nový človek"		8:45
Total length:			79:53

== Personnel ==
- Michal "Majk Spirit" Dušicka – executive producer, vocals, lyrics
- Nironic – backing vocals
- MadSkill – backing vocals, mastering, mixing
- Orion – backing vocals
- Delik – backing vocals
- H16 – backing vocals
- Celeste Buckingham – backing vocals
- Cigo – backing vocals
- Supa – backing vocals
- DNA – backing vocals
- Suvereno – backing vocals
- Marek Šurin – mastering, mixing
- Viktor Hazard – recording
- Marek Rehák – photography, cover art design
- Michal Švihra – executive producer
- Daniela Grečnerová – executive producer

== Charts ==
Chart (2011)	Peak position
Czech Albums Chart	16

=== Singles ===
Year	Title	Peak positions	
Year	Title	SK 50	SK 100
2011	"Good vibration" with MadSkill	2	41
2011	"Sen" with Nironic	4	46
2012	"Ja a ty" with Celeste Buckingham	4	48
2012	"Sexy"	4	39
2012	"Hľadám pravdu"	44	—

== Release history ==
Region(s)	Date(s)	Format(s)	Edition(s)
Europe	November 5, 2011	download	Standard
Slovakia/Czech Republic	November 11, 2011	CD	Standard
Slovakia/Czech Republic	April 22, 2012	DVD	Live

== See also ==
- European hip hop
- Celeste Buckingham discography
- The 100 Greatest Slovak Albums of All Time
