= List of number-one songs (Slovakia) =

This is a list of number-one hits in Slovakia by year from the Rádio Top 100 Oficiálna chart which is compiled weekly by IFPI Czech Republic on a weekly basis since the cancellation of the Slovak national section (SNS IFPI) on December 31, 2009.

- 2000s
- 2010s
- 2020s
