= List of number-one songs of the 2000s (Slovakia) =

Rádio Top 100 Oficiálna is the official chart of Slovakia, ranking the top songs based on radio airplay as compiled and published weekly by the Slovak national section (SNS IFPI). Beginning in 2010, IFPI Czech Republic took over that responsibility.

Below are the songs that reached number one on the chart from September 2006 through December 2009.

== Number-one songs ==
| Issue date | Artist | Song | Weeks at number one |
2006
| September 5 | Paris Hilton | "Stars Are Blind" | 5 |
| October 10 | Peha | "Renesancia" | 3 |
| October 31 | Tina | "Viem, že povieš áno" | 1 |
| November 7 | Peha | "Renesancia" | 1 |
| November 14 | Tina | "Viem, že povieš áno" | 4 |
| December 12 | Nelly Furtado | "All Good Things (Come to an End)" | 1 |
| December 19 | Desmod | "Zhorí všetko čo mám" | 1 |
| December 26 | Tina | "Viem, že povieš áno" | 3 |
2007
| January 16 | Nelly Furtado | "All Good Things (Come to an End)" | 1 |
| January 23 | Desmod | "Zhorí všetko čo mám" | 1 |
| January 30 | Nelly Furtado | "All Good Things (Come to an End)" | 2 |
| February 13 | Desmod | "Zhorí všetko čo mám" | 2 |
| February 27 | Nelly Furtado | "Say It Right" | 1 |
| March 6 | Tina | "Viem, že povieš áno" | 1 |
| March 13 | Nelly Furtado | "Say It Right" | 11 |
| May 29 | Zdenka Predná | "Keď To Nejde" | 4 |
| June 26 | Rihanna and Jay-Z | "Umbrella" | 1 |
| July 3 | Zdenka Predná | "Keď To Nejde" | 2 |
| July 17 | Rihanna and Jay-Z | "Umbrella" | 1 |
| July 24 | Sunrise Avenue | "Fairytale Gone Bad" | 1 |
| July 31 | Rihanna and Jay-Z | "Umbrella" | 1 |
| August 7 | Sunrise Avenue | "Fairytale Gone Bad" | 3 |
| August 28 | Fergie | "Big Girls Don't Cry" | 6 |
| October 9 | Peha | "Opýtaj sa" | 3 |
| October 30 | James Blunt | "1973" | 1 |
| November 6 | Timbaland featuring OneRepublic | "Apologize" | 16 |
2008
| February 26 | Leona Lewis | "Bleeding Love" | 1 |
| March 4 | Peha | "Muoj Bože" | 2 |
| March 18 | Mika | "Happy Ending" | 4 |
| April 15 | Peter Cmorik | "Čo to Znamená" | 2 |
| April 29 | Desmod | "Zober Ma Domov" | 4 |
| May 27 | I.M.T. Smile | "Mám Krásny Sen" | 1 |
| June 3 | Estelle featuring Kanye West | "American Boy" | 1 |
| June 10 | Rihanna | "Take a Bow" | 3 |
| July 1 | I.M.T. Smile | "Mám Krásny Sen" | 9 |
| September 2 | Desmod | "Lavíny" | 1 |
| September 9 | Morandi | "Angels" | 1 |
| September 16 | Desmod | "Lavíny" | 2 |
| September 30 | I.M.T. Smile | "Mám Krásny Sen" | 1 |
| October 7 | Morandi | "Angels" | 1 |
| October 14 | Coldplay | "Viva La Vida" | 6 |
| November 25 | Desmod | "Vyrobená Pre Mňa" | 2 |
| December 9 | Katy Perry | "Hot n Cold" | 1 |
| December 16 | Desmod | "Vyrobená Pre Mňa" | 1 |
| December 23 | Beyoncé | "If I Were a Boy" | 1 |
2009
| January 6 | Leona Lewis | "Forgive Me" | 1 |
| January 13 | Beyoncé | "If I Were a Boy" | 1 |
| January 21 | Jana Kirschner | "Pokoj v duši" | 10 |
| March 31 | Lady Gaga | "Poker Face" | 6 |
| May 12 | Mando Diao | "Dance with Somebody" | 3 |
| June 2 | Lady Gaga | "Poker Face" | 1 |
| June 9 | Lily Allen | "Not Fair" | 1 |
| June 16 | Beyoncé | "Halo" | 1 |
| June 23 | Lily Allen | "Not Fair" | 2 |
| July 7 | Zuzana Smatanová | "Daj ruku do mojej ruky" | 1 |
| July 14 | Lily Allen | "Not Fair" | 1 |
| July 21 | David Guetta featuring Kelly Rowland | "When Love Takes Over" | 4 |
| August 18 | The Black Eyed Peas | "I Gotta Feeling" | 1 |
| August 25 | David Guetta featuring Kelly Rowland | "When Love Takes Over" | 3 |
| September 15 | Madonna | "Celebration" | 3 |
| October 6 | Morandi | "Colors" | 3 |
| October 27 | Jay Sean featuring Lil Wayne | "Down" | 1 |
| November 3 | Robbie Williams | "Bodies" | 1 |
| November 10 | Jay Sean featuring Lil Wayne | "Down" | 5 |
| December 15 | Rihanna | "Russian Roulette" | 1 |
| December 22 | Lady Gaga | "Bad Romance" | 6 |

== See also ==
- 2000s in music
- List of number-one songs of the 2000s (Czech Republic)
