= List of number-one songs (Czech Republic) =

This is a list of number-one hits in the Czech Republic by decade from the Rádio Top 100 Oficiální chart which is compiled weekly by IFPI Czech Republic.

- List of number-one songs of the 2000s (Czech Republic)
- List of number-one songs of the 2010s (Czech Republic)
- List of number-one songs of the 2020s (Czech Republic)

== See also ==
- List of number-one albums of the 2010s (Czech Republic)
- List of number-one albums of the 2020s (Czech Republic)
