= Majk Spirit =

Slovak rapper (born 1984)

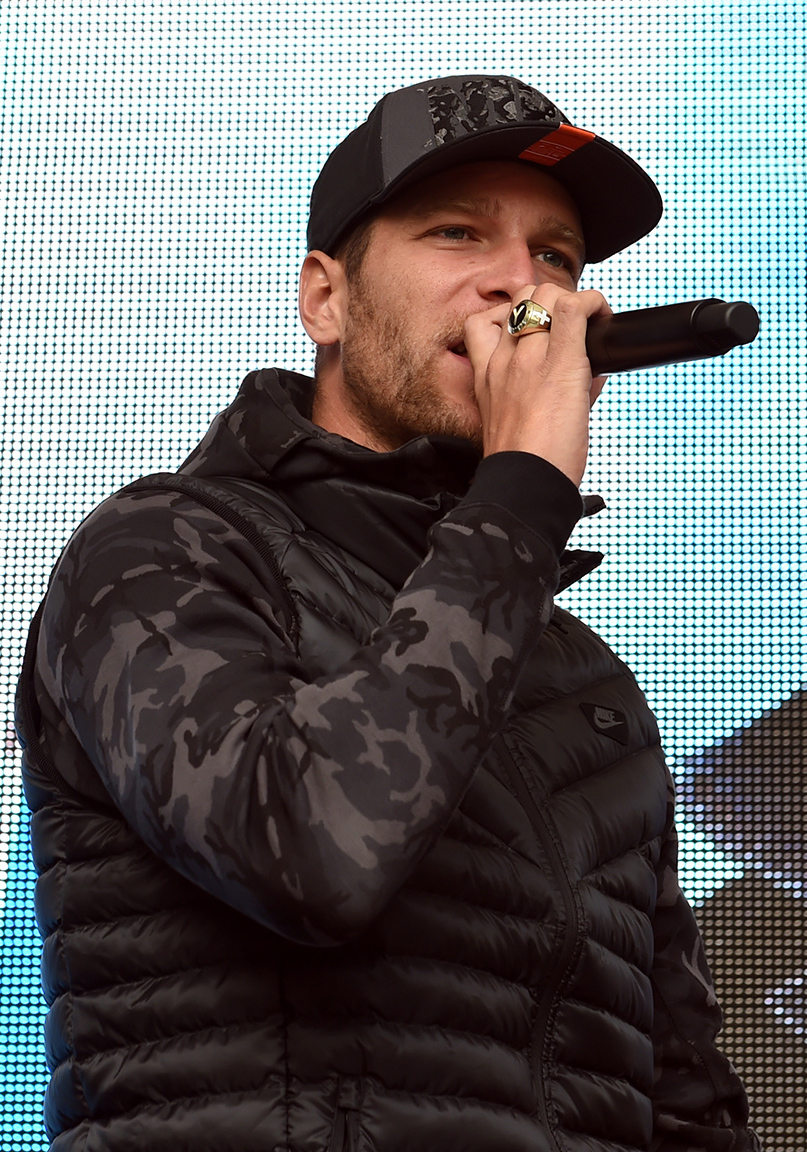
- Spirit in 2015

Background information
- Also known as: Dilema; Koko Šajs; Koko Najs
- Born: Michal Dušička; 28 August 1984 (age 42); Bratislava, Czechoslovakia (present-day Slovakia)
- Genres: Hip-hop; pop; dance
- Years active: 2000–present
- Label: BeatBan (2010–present)
- Website: majkspirit.sk

Majk Spirit (born Michal Dušička; 28 August 1984, Bratislava, Slovakia) is a Slovak rapper and member of the group H16, named after his primary school Hálova 16 in Petržalka.

The winner of the MTV Europe Music Awards for the Best Czech and Slovak Act category in 2012, Majk Spirit released his debut album Nový človek in 2011, earning the Best New Artist award at Slávik annual music poll the same year as well.

== Discography ==
Studio albums

- Nový človek (New Person, 2011)
- Y (2015)
- Nie som tu náhodou (2018)
- Artist (2020)
- Playli5t (2023)
- Nový Človek 2.0 (2023)

with H16

- Kvalitný materiál (Quality material, 2006)
- Čísla nepustia (Numbers don't let go, 2008)
- Rýmy, Hudba a Boh (Rhymes, Music, and God, 2013)
- Sila (Power, 2016)
- Lockdown Music (2021)

== See also ==
- "Ja a ty" (Me and you) – a 2012 song recorded with Celeste Buckingham
- "I Was Wrong" – a 2013 song recorded with Buckingham
