= MTV Europe Music Award for Best Czech & Slovak Act =

The following is a list of the MTV Europe Music Award winners and nominees for Best Czech & Slovak Act.

== 2010s ==
Year	Winner	Nominees
2010	Charlie Straight	Ewa Farna; Aneta Langerová; Rytmus; Marek Ztracený
2011	Charlie Straight	Ben Cristovao; Debbi; PSH; Rytmus
2012	Majk Spirit	Ben Cristovao; Sunshine; Mandrage; Celeste Buckingham
2013	Celeste Buckingham	Ben Cristovao; Charlie Straight; Ektor & DJ Wich; Peter Bič Project
