= Warner Music Czech Republic =

Czech record label

- Parent company: Warner Music Group
- Founded: 1990
- Country of origin: Czech Republic
- Official website: warner-music.cz

Warner Music Czech Republic (formerly EMI Czech Republic and Parlophone Czech Republic) is a record label based in the Czech Republic. The company was founded under the name Monitor in 1990. EMI purchased the label in 1994 and maintained it under the name Monitor/EMI s.r.o. Later, the label was renamed EMI Czech Republic s.r.o. It was sold to the Warner Music Group in 2013, with EMI labels, for £487 million.
