= Celeste Buckingham =

Slovak singer-songwriter (born 1995)

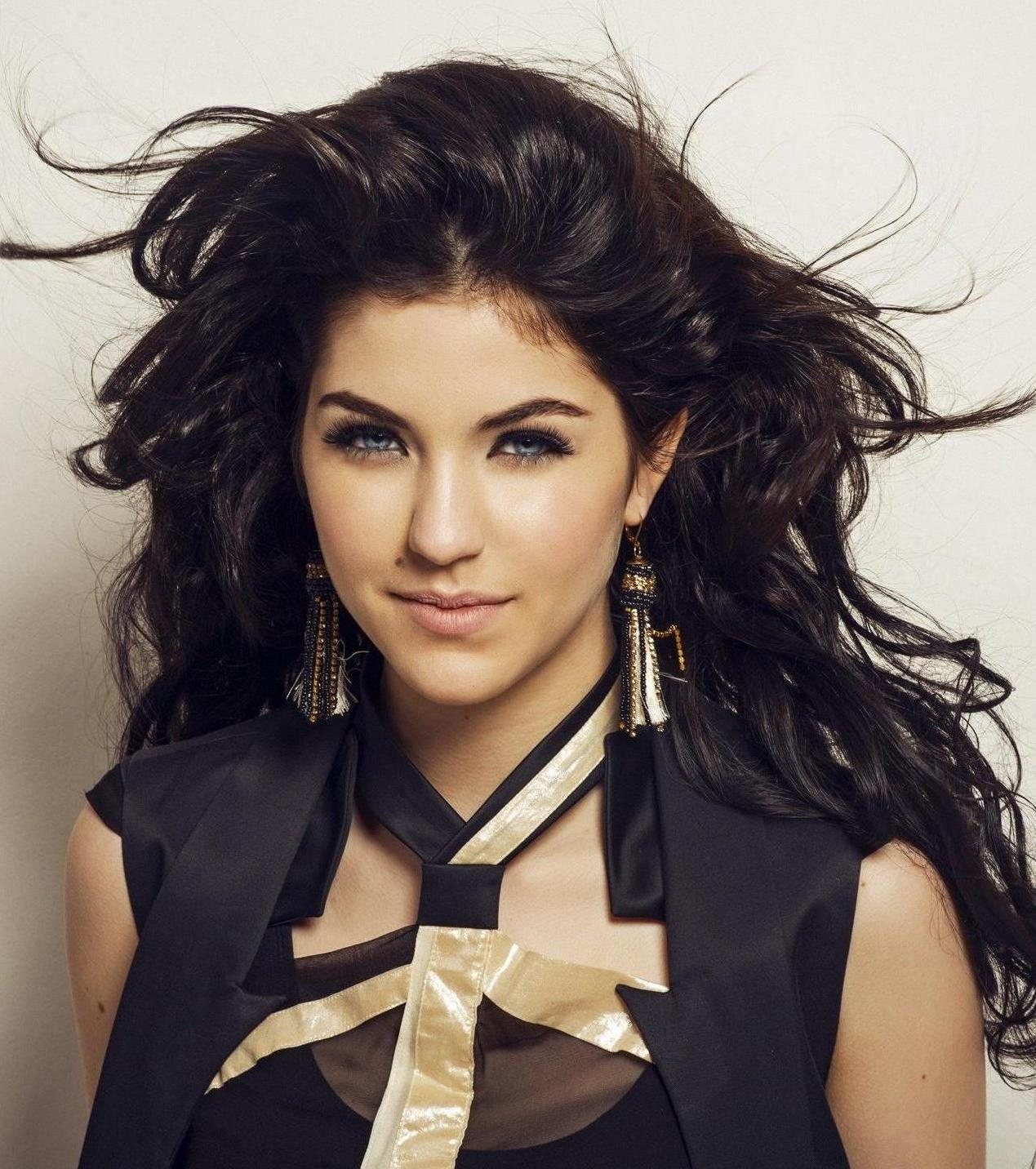
- Buckingham in 2012

Background information
- Born: Celeste Rizvana Buckingham; 3 May 1995 (age 31); Zürich, Switzerland
- Origin: Borinka, Slovakia
- Genre: Pop
- Occupations: Singer; songwriter; author
- Instrument: Vocals
- Years active: 2011–present
- Label: EMI Czech Republic
- Website: celestebuckingham.com

Celeste Rizvana Buckingham (born 3 May 1995) is a Slovak singer and songwriter. Buckingham began her career in 2011, after finishing fifth in the second season of Česko Slovenská SuperStar, the joint Czech-Slovak version of Idol.

Born in Switzerland to an American father and Iranian mother, Buckingham settled with her family in Slovakia at the age of three. After beginning her professional career with Česko Slovenská SuperStar, Buckingham released the singles "Blue Guitar" and "Nobody Knows", both of which became top ten radio hits in Slovakia. The singles were followed by the release of her debut studio album Don't Look Back (2012). While a moderate commercial success, the album spawned the release of the single "Run Run Run", becoming a number-one radio hit in both Slovakia and the Czech Republic, and the most-played song of the year by a Slovak artist. Buckingham has since gone on to release four additional studio albums as an independent artist: Where I Belong (2013), So Far So Good (2015), BARE (2017), and Life (2022).

In addition to music, Buckingham has additionally worked as a model and television host, and was a judge on X Factor Česko a Slovensko, the Czech-Slovak version of The X Factor, in 2014. In 2007, she authored and released the children's picture book The Lost Princess (2007), cowritten by her younger sister Carmel.

== Early life and education ==
Let's put it this way – I'm a stranger who has lived in Slovakia for a very long time, and has learned the local language. I've managed the accent quite well, though I still make grammar mistakes. When mum and dad put me in kindergarten, I couldn't speak Slovak at all, it was too hard for me. I still remember that children would laugh at me. But eventually, I managed it [...]."

— Buckingham about her native-like Slovak (SME, 29 August 2012)

Buckingham was born on 3 May 1995 in Zürich to a culturally diverse family. Her father, Thomas (born 1954), is an American from Chicago with British-Irish origins, while her mother, Zarin (born 1961), is Iranian with Russian heritage. Shortly after Buckingham's birth, the family relocated to Anchorage, Alaska in the United States, where her father worked as a cardiologist. Buckingham is the elder of two sisters: her younger sister is Carmel (born 1998).

In 1999, the family left Alaska and relocated to Slovakia, after Buckingham's father was offered a job there. After arriving in Slovakia, they settled in the village of Borinka, outside of Bratislava. Despite initially planning to only spend a year in Slovakia, they ultimately remained there indefinitely. Upon beginning school in Slovakia, Buckingham could not speak the Slovak language and was teased by her peers for this inability, although she soon became fluent. Buckingham was later educated at Forel International School, an international school in Bratislava, founded by her mother. In 2012, she began studying music at Belmont University in Nashville, Tennessee.

Buckingham developed an interest in music at a young age, and began taking lessons in classical ballet and Latin dance, while learning to play the piano and guitar. In 2007, she and her sister coauthored the children's picture book The Lost Princess, released by Divis-Slovakia.

== Career ==
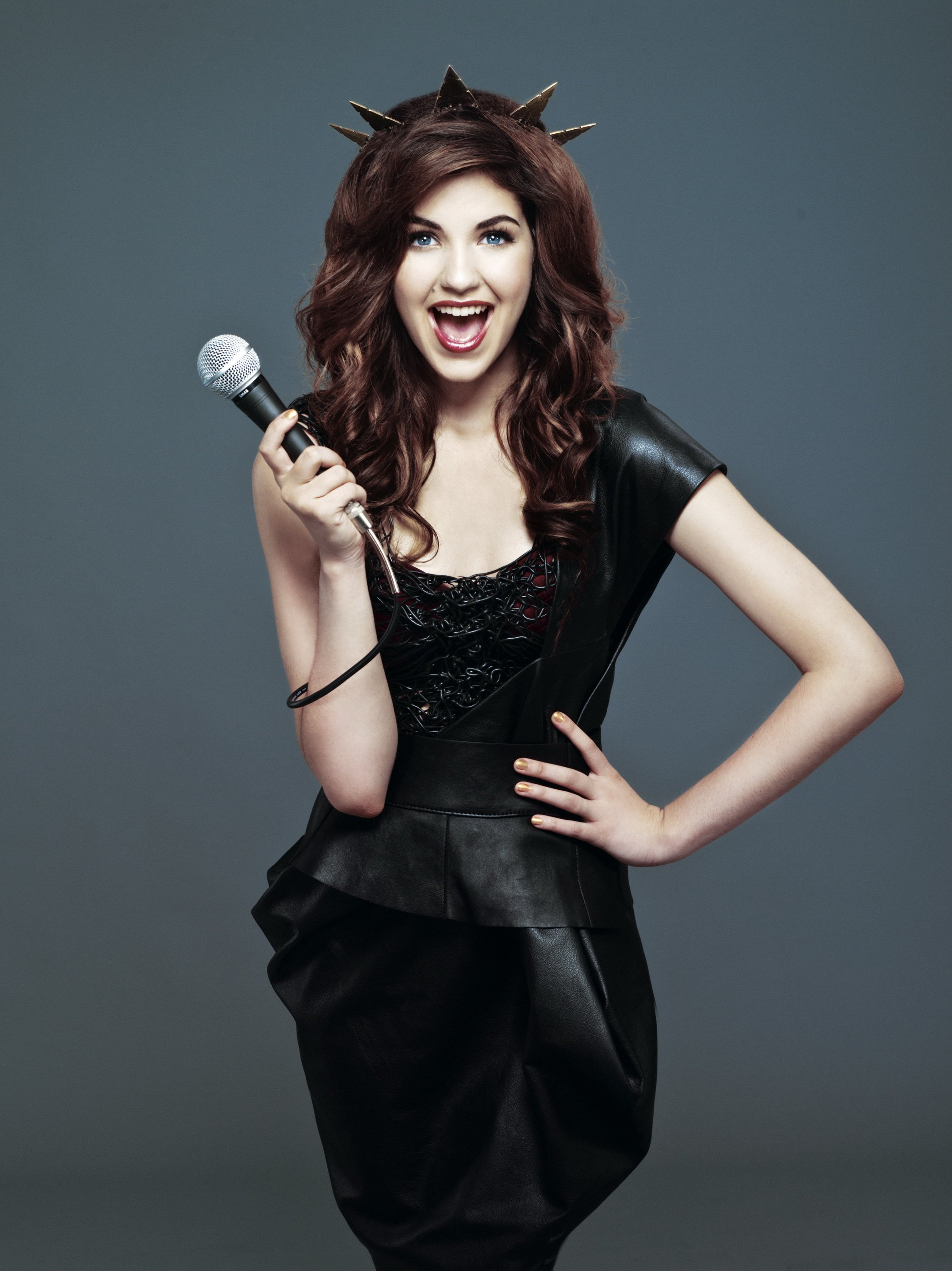
Buckingham in 2012

=== 2011–2012: Česko Slovenská SuperStar and Don't Look Back ===
Buckingham began her professional career in 2011, after auditioning for season two of Česko Slovenská SuperStar, the joint Czech-Slovak version of Idol. Buckingham had been encouraged to audition for the series by record producers Martin Šrámek and Andrej Hruška. Buckingham went on to pass her audition, and finished the competition in tenth place, being eliminated in week two of the finals.

Česko Slovenská SuperStar season 2 performances and results
Week #	Theme	Song choice	Original artist	Order #	Result
Audition	Bratislava	"Because of You"	Kelly Clarkson	N/A	Advanced
Top 100	Theatre Week Round 1 – Groups	Unknown		N/A	Advanced
Top 80	Theatre Week Round 2 – Quartets	"Hey, Soul Sister"	Train	N/A	Advanced
Top 40	Dlouhá cesta	Unknown		N/A	Advanced
Top 24	Semifinal Round 1 – Girls	"Unfaithful"	Rihanna	12	Safe
Top 20	Semifinal Round 2 – Girls	"Mercy"	Duffy	10	Safe
Top 16	Semifinal Round 3 – Girls	"Listen"	Beyoncé	8	Safe
Top 12	My Idol	"You Had Me"	Joss Stone	11	Safe
Top 10	Czech and Slovak Hits	"Nekráčaj predo mnou"	Zuzana Smatanová	9	Eliminated

Following her elimination, Buckingham signed a recording contract with EMI Czech Republic to begin a career as a solo artist. In the aftermath of the competition, Buckingham spoke negatively of her experiences, stating that she and other contestants had no choice of songs and were frequently involved in disputes with directors and each other. She later released the singles "Blue Guitar" and "Nobody Knows" in July and November 2011, respectively, both of which became top ten radio hits in Slovakia. She later collaborated with Slovak rapper Majk Spirit on the song "Ja a ty" in February 2012, before releasing her debut studio album Don't Look Back in April. Coinciding with the release of Don't Look Up was the release of her third solo single "Run Run Run". The song went on to become a hit in Slovakia and the Czech Republic, topping both countries' radio songs charts and peaking at number-two on each country's overall singles charts. "Run Run Run" additionally became the most-played song by a Slovak artist of the year, and the second most-played song of the year in the Czech Republic.

Following the commercial success of "Run Run Run", Buckingham won New Artist of the Year at the 2012 Slávik Awards and Best Female Singer at the 2012 OTO Awards, while also being nominated for Female Singer of the Year at the Slávik Awards, and for Best Czech & Slovak Act at the 2012 MTV Europe Music Awards.

=== 2013–present: Independent artist ===
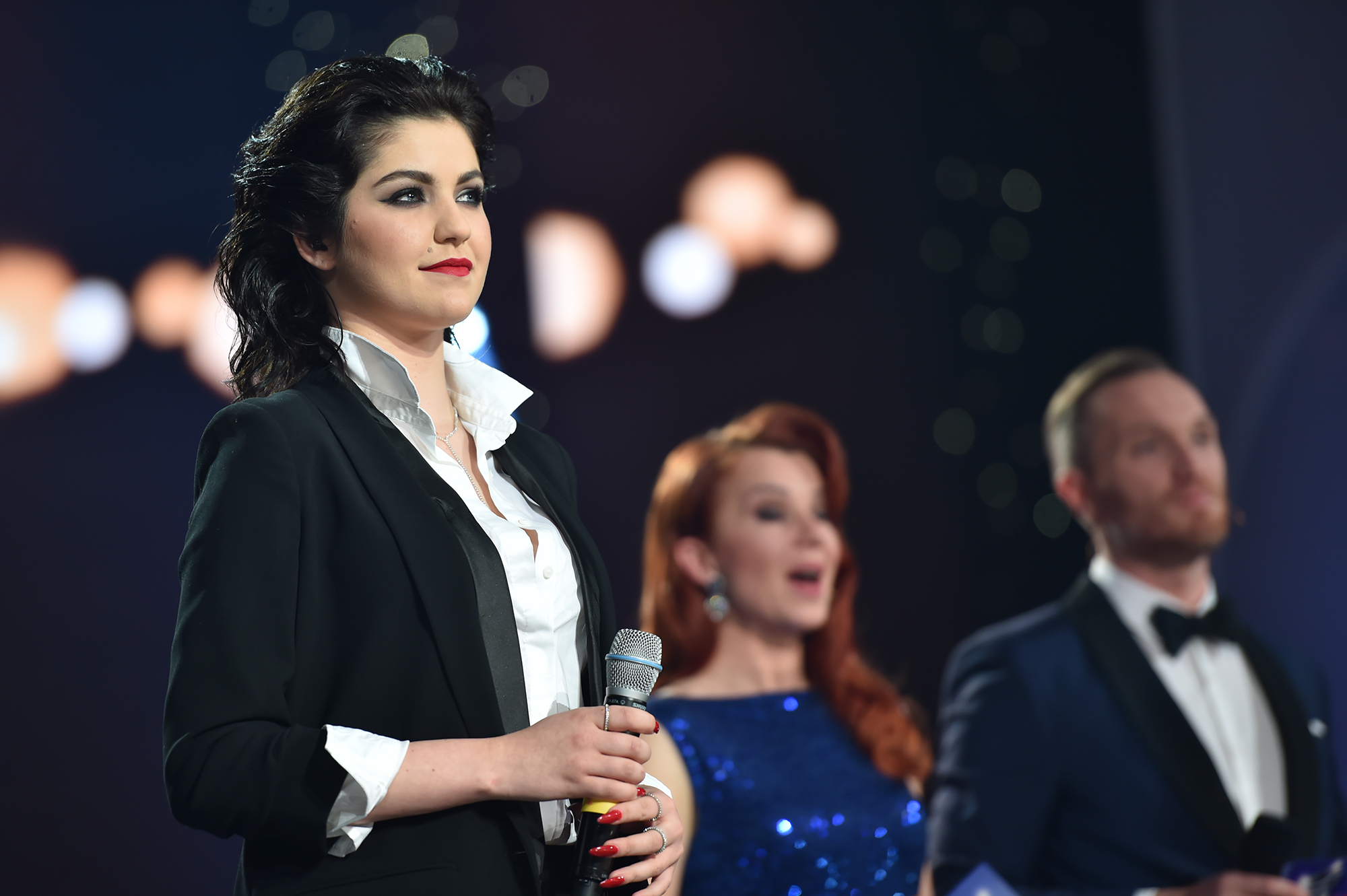
Buckingham performing in Bratislava in 2017

Buckingham ended her collaboration with EMI Czech Republic in late 2012, and continued her career as an independent musician. She later released the single "Never Be You" in November 2012, to serve as the lead single to her upcoming second studio album. The song was a moderate hit in Slovakia, but became a top ten radio hit in the Czech Republic. The song was followed by the release of "I Was Wrong" in May 2013, Buckingham's second collaboration with Majk Spirit. "I Was Wrong" went on to become Buckingham's second number-one radio hit in Slovakia, while also peaking at number-two on the Slovak overall singles chart. She went on to win Best Female Singer for the second consecutive year at the 2013 OTO Awards, while also becoming the final winner of Best Czech & Slovak Act at the 2013 MTV Europe Music Awards, following the category's discontinuation the following year.

== Bibliography ==
- 2007, The Lost Princess with Carmel Buckingham (illustrated by Georgina Soar)

== Discography ==
- Don't Look Back (2012)
- Where I Belong (2013)
- So Far So Good (2015)
- BARE (2017)
- Life (2022)

== Filmography ==
=== Reality shows ===
Reality TV
Air date			Episode	Role	Director	Ratings^{†}	
Year	Month	Day	Episode	Role	Director	CZ (15+)	SK (12–54)
2011	February	Česko Slovenská SuperStar					
2011	February	27	# 03: "Regional Auditions – Bratislava, Brno"	Herself	Pepe Majeský	0,892	0,630
2011	March	12	# 07: "Theater Week (Part 1)"	Herself	Pepe Majeský	0,939	0,478
2011	March	13	# 08: "Theater Week (Part 2)"	Herself	Pepe Majeský	0,917	0,679
2011	March	14	# 09: "Long Way Week"	Herself	Pepe Majeský	0,787	0,521
2011	March	19	# 10: "Semi-final Week 1 – Girls"	Herself	Pepe Majeský	0,874	0,490
2011	March	21	# 12: "Semi-final Week 1 – Elimination"	Herself	Pepe Majeský	0,843	0,564
2011	March	27	# 14: "Semi-final Week 2 – Girls"	Herself	Pepe Majeský	1,123	0,620
2011	March	28	# 15: "Semi-final Week 2 – Elimination"	Herself	Pepe Majeský	0,860	0,568
2011	April	2	# 16: "Semi-final Week 3 – Girls"	Herself	Pepe Majeský	0,922	0,478
2011	April	4	# 18: "Semi-final Week 3 – Elimination"	Herself	Pepe Majeský	0,937	0,620
2011	April	10	# 19: "Final Week 1 – My Idol"	Herself	Pepe Majeský	1,154	0,594
2011	April	11	# 20: "Final Week 1 – Elimination"	Herself	Pepe Majeský	0,918	0,575
2011	April	17	# 21: "Final Week 2 – Czechoslovak Songs"	Herself	Pepe Majeský	1,216	0,593
2011	April	18	# 22: "Final Week 2 – Elimination"	Herself	Pepe Majeský	0,937	0,540
2011	April	24	# 23: "Final Week 3 – Dance Hits"	Herself/audience	Pepe Majeský	0,923	0,494
2011	April	25	# 24: "Final Week 3 – Elimination"	Herself/audience	Pepe Majeský	1,171	0,491
2011	April	Modré z neba					
2011	April	27	—	Herself	Ivan Holub	—	—N/a
2011	May	Česko Slovenská SuperStar					
2011	May	1	# 25: "Final Week 4 – Rock Hits"	Herself/audience	Pepe Majeský	1,066	0,332
2011	May	2	# 26: "Final Week 4 – Elimination"	Herself/audience	Pepe Majeský	0,835	0,476
2011	May	9	# 28: "Final Week 5 – Elimination"	Herself/audience	Pepe Majeský	0,675	0,463
2011	May	16	# 30: "Final Week 6 – Elimination"	Herself/audience	Pepe Majeský	0,944	0,473
2011	May	22	# 31: "Final Week 7 – Queen and ABBA"	Herself/audience	Pepe Majeský	1,221	0,518
2011	May	23	# 32: "Final Week 7 – Elimination"	Herself/audience	Pepe Majeský	0,949	0,411
2011	May	29	# 33: "Final Week 8 – Miro Žbirka"	Herself/audience	Pepe Majeský	1,335	0,531
2011	May	30	# 34: "Final Week 8 – Elimination"	Herself/audience	Pepe Majeský	1,083	0,480
2011	June	5	# 35: "Grand Finale"	Herself/audience	Pepe Majeský	1,468	0,634
— denotes either an untitled episode and/or a series unreleased in a region.						^{†} in millions.	

=== Morning shows ===
Breakfast TV
Air date			Episode	Role	Director	Ratings	
Year	Month	Day	Episode	Role	Director	CZ	SK
2011	April	Snídaně s Novou					
2011	April	8	—	Herself	N/A	—N/a	—
2011	April	19	—	Herself	N/A	—N/a	—
2011	May	17	Weather forecast	Host	N/A	—N/a	—
2011	June	Teleráno					
2011	June	1	—	Herself	N/A	—	—N/a
2011	December	Snídaně s Novou					
2011	December	1	—	Herself	N/A	—N/a	—
2012	March	1	—	Herself	N/A	—N/a	—
2012	May	30	—	Herself	N/A	—N/a	—
2012	November	29	—	Herself	N/A	—N/a	—
— denotes either an untitled episode and/or a series unreleased in a region.

=== TV specials ===
TV special
Air date			Episode	Role	Director	Ratings^{†}	
Year	Month	Day	Episode	Role	Director	CZ	SK
2012	November	Slovensko 2012 Advent					
2012	November	27	#02: "Levoča – Radnica"	Herself	Laco Halama	—	0,300
2012	December	23	#24: "Bratislava – Mlynská dolina"	Herself	Peter Nuňez	—	0,650
— denotes either an untitled episode and/or a series unreleased in a region.						^{†} in millions.	

=== TV documentaries ===
TV documentary
Air date			Episode	Role	Director	Ratings	
Year	Month	Day	Episode	Role	Director	CZ	SK
2011	April	Backstage LIVE					
2011	April	18	# ??: "SuperStar 2"	Herself	N/A	—N/a	—
— denotes either an untitled episode and/or a series unreleased in a region.
