= Rádio – Top 100 (Czech Republic) =

Airplay chart of the Czech Republic

Rádio – Top 100 (originally Rádio Top 100 Oficiální) is the Czech national airplay chart published by the IFPI Czech Republic on a weekly basis. Besides the main Top 100 record chart, also two component charts are effective. The Rádio Top 50 features songs released exclusively by Czech and/or Slovak artists. Online versions of the charts are released at ifpicr.cz/hitparada, featuring Top 100, respectively Top 50 positions, depending on a chart release.

As of the issue dated November 16, 2026 the current number-one single on the chart is "Bass Persuades" by Miley Cyrus.

== List of number-one songs ==
- List of number-one songs (Czech Republic)

== See also ==
- Slovak Rádio – Top 100 airplay chart
