= SuperStar Search Slovakia =

Slovak music competition television series

- Also known as: Slovensko hľadá SuperStar
- Created by: Simon Fuller
- Presented by: Season 1 - 3 Martin Rausch Adela Banášová
- Judges: Season 1 Laco Lučenič Pavol Habera Lenka Slaná Julo Viršík Season 2 Laco Lučenič Pavol Habera Jana Hubinská Julo Viršík Season 3 Laco Lučenič Dara Rolins Pavol Habera
- Countries of origin: Czech Republic; Slovakia
- No. of seasons: 3

Original release
- Network: STV (Seasons 1–2); Markíza (Season 3)
- Release: October 29, 2004 – December 16, 2007

SuperStar Search Slovakia (Slovak: Slovensko hľadá SuperStar) is a Slovak casting television series based on the Idol franchise. The contest aimed to determine the best young singer in Slovakia and was aired by the national TV network STV in seasons 1 and 2. A third season was broadcast by private TV channel Markíza.

All seasons of SuperStar Search Slovakia had four audition cities to find new talent all over Slovakia, including: Košice, Banská Bystrica, Žilina, and finally finishing in Bratislava.

Both TV Nova and Markíza, the Czech and Slovak broadcasters respectively, announced that Česko hledá SuperStar was merged with SuperStar Search Slovakia into a bilingual federal program titled SuperStar beginning 6 September 2009.

== Cast ==
Judges and host of the last season of SuperStar

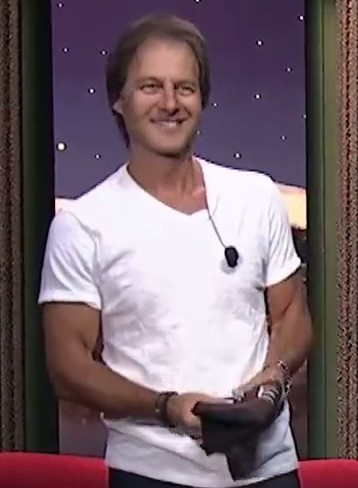
Pavol Habera

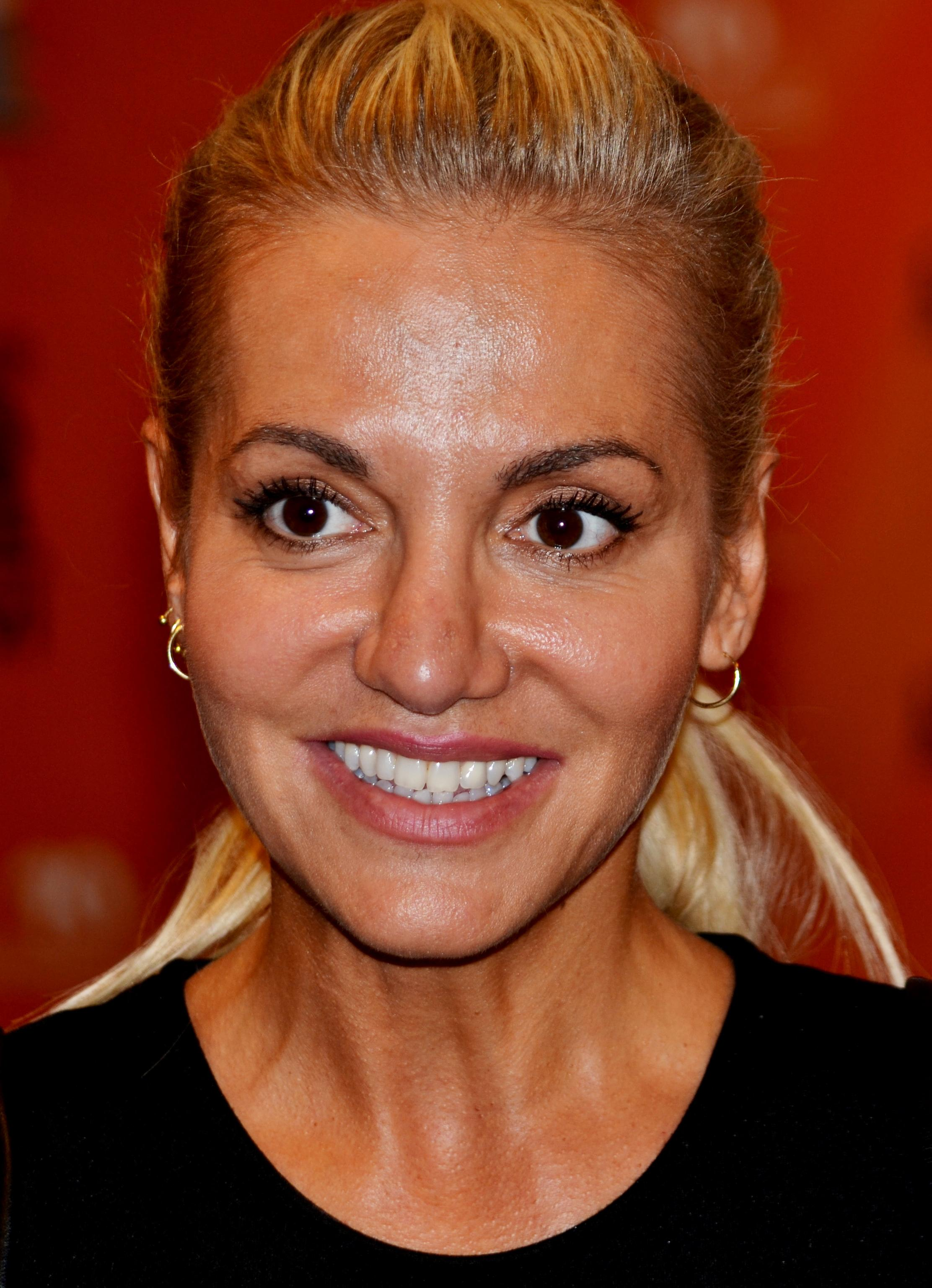
Dara Rolins

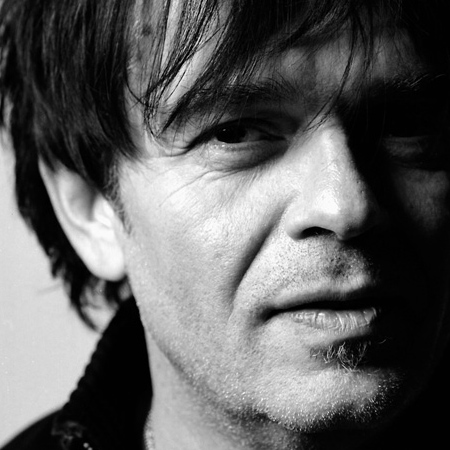
Laco Lučenič

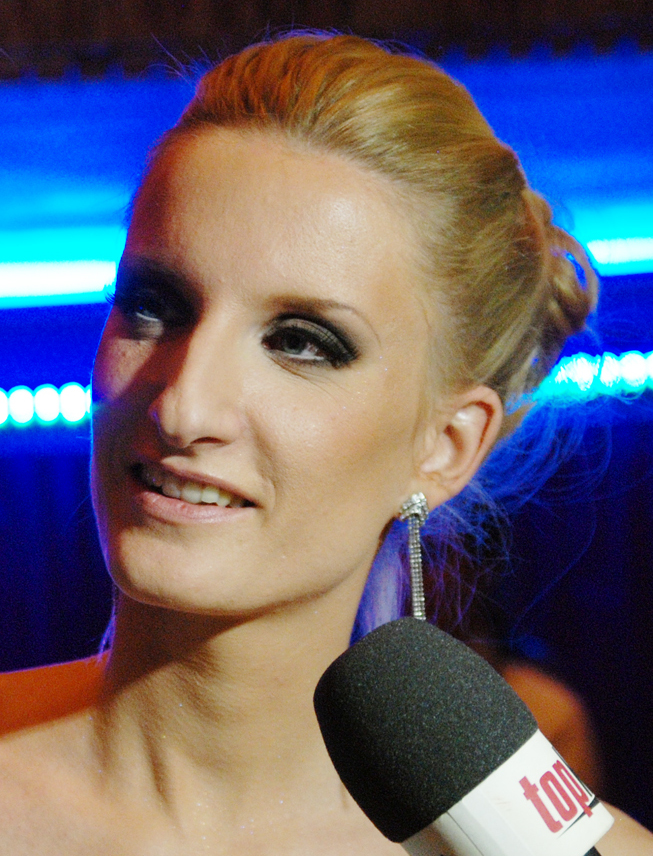
Adela Banášová

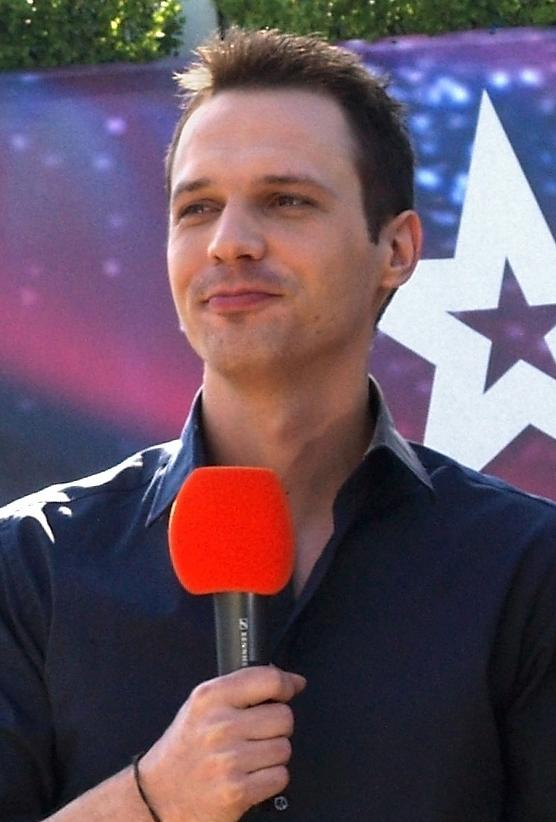
Martin "Pyco" Rausch

=== Hosts ===
Key
Host of SuperStar

Presenter	Season 1	Season 2	Season 3
Adela Banášová			
Martin "Pyco" Rausch			

=== Judges ===
Key

Judges of SuperStar

Presenter	Season 1	Season 2	Season 3
Pavol Habera			
Laco Lučenič			
Dara Rolins			
Julo Viršík			
Jana Hubinská			
Lenka Slaná			

== Series overview ==
Color key

Female contestant
Male contestant

Season	Premiere	Finale	No. of finalists	No. of final weeks	Winner	Runner-up	Judges			
One	October 29, 2004	April 15, 2005	11	10	Katarína Koščová	Martina Šindlerová	Pavol Habera	Lenka Slaná	Laco Lučenič	Julo Viršík
Two	November 4, 2005	April 7, 2006	11	10	Peter Cmorík	Mária Bundová	Pavol Habera	Jana Hubinská	Laco Lučenič	Julo Viršík
Three	September 2, 2007	December 16, 2007	10	9	Vierka Berkyová	Dominika Mirgová	Pavol Habera	Dara Rolins	Laco Lučenič	

=== Season 1 ===
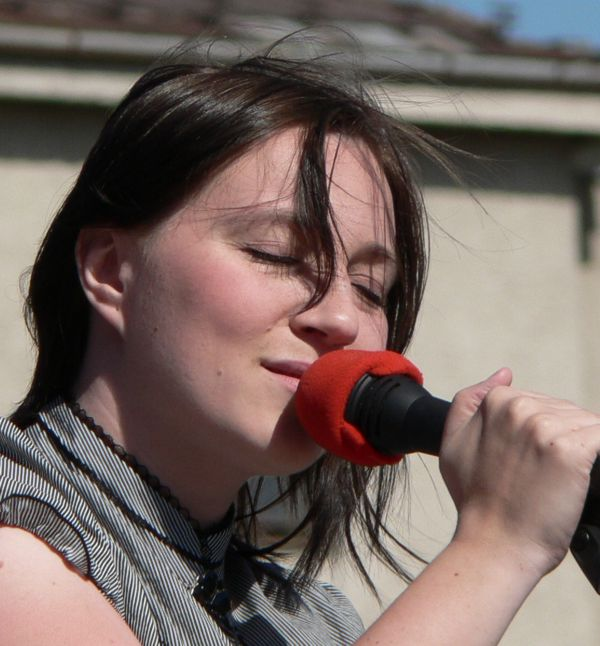
Katarína Koščová, the first season winner

In season 1, eleven contestants made it to the finals. The first single recorded by the top 11 was "Kým vieš snívať" (lit. 'As long as you can dream') and was composed by judge Pavol Habera (music) and Slovak poem writer Daniel Hevier. Every final night had its theme. The audience was able to vote for contestants from the very beginning of the show, with voting ending during the results show on the same day.

=== Season 2 ===
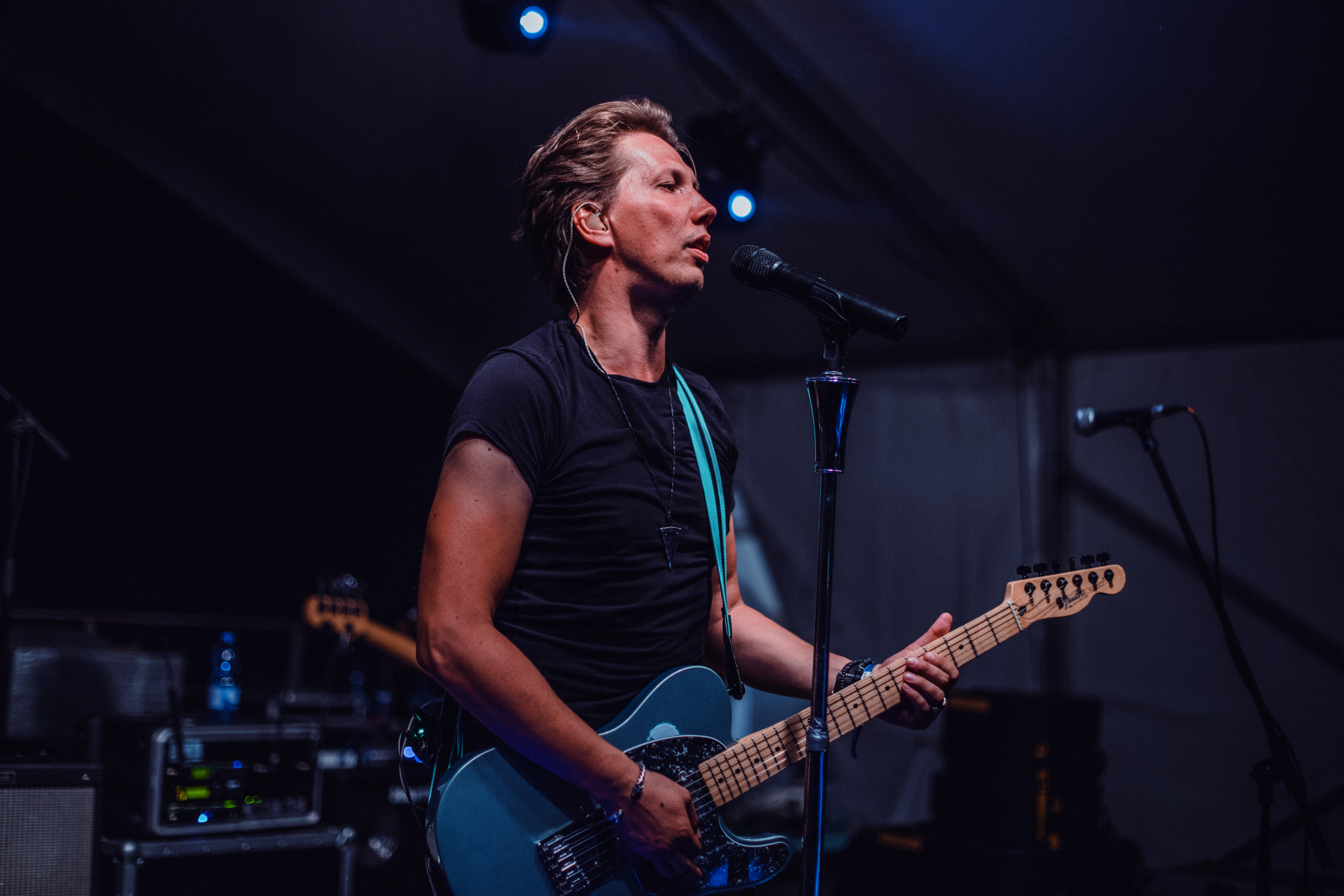
Peter Cmorík, the second season winner

In season 2, eleven contestants made it to the finals. The first single recorded by the top 11 was "So mnou môžeš rátať" (lit. 'You can count on with me') and was composed by judge Pavol Habera (music) and Slovak poem writer Daniel Hevier. Every final night had its theme. The audience was able to vote for contestants from the very beginning of the show, with voting ending during the results show on the same day.

=== Season 3 ===
A third season aired on 2 September 2007 and was broadcast by private TV channel Markíza with significant changes, including graphic ident and gradual elimination in the semifinals. Ten contestants made it to the finals. The first single recorded by the top 10 was "Dotkni sa hviezd" (lit. 'Touch the Stars') and was composed by judge Pavol Habera (music) and Slovak poet Daniel Hevier. Every final night had its theme. The audience was able to vote for contestants from the very beginning of the show, with voting ending during the results show on the same day.
