= SuperStar Search Slovakia season 1 =

Season of television series

SuperStar Search Slovakia
- Season 1
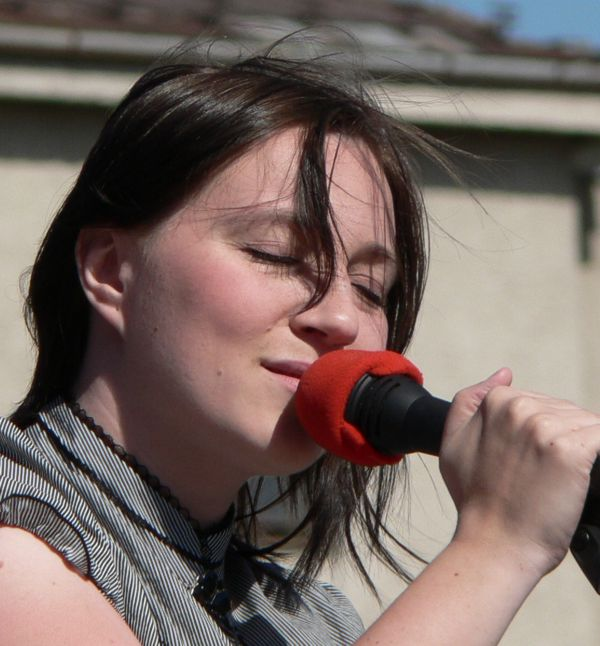
- Hosted by: Martin Rausch; Adela Banášová
- Judges: Ladislav Lučenič; Pavol Habera; Lenka Slaná; Julo Viršík
- Winner: Katarína Koščová
- Runner-up: Martina Šindlerová
- Finals venue: National Tennis Centre

Release
- Original network: STV
- Original release: October 29, 2004 – April 15, 2005

Season chronology
- Next → Season 2

SuperStar Search Slovakia (Slovak: Slovensko hľadá SuperStar) is a casting television show based on the popular British show Pop Idol. The show is a contest to determine the best young singer in Slovakia. It was broadcast by the national TV network STV in the late 2004 and early 2005. The first season premiered on October 29, 2004, and concluded on April 15, 2005. The main show was aired on Fridays, the accompanying SuperStar Search Slovakia Magazine was broadcast on Tuesdays and Thursdays, premiering on December 14, 2004.

== Judges and hosts ==
=== Judges ===
The show had four judges; singers and musicians Ladislav Lučenič and Pavol Habera, a music producer Lenka Slaná, and a radio personality Július Viršík. Lučenič served as the head-judge and had the main vote.

=== Hosts ===
The regional auditions and live shows were hosted by the then radio presenters Adela Banášová and Martin Rausch (referred to by his radio nickname, Pyco). The accompanying Superstar Search Slovakia Magazine was hosted by Banášová and Rausch's radio associate, Branislav Ciberej (a.k.a. Bruno). The magazine covered the making of the show and featured interviews with contestants, judges or musicians.

== Regional auditions ==
Auditions were held in Bratislava, Košice, Banská Bystrica, Žilina in the summer of 2004.

Audition City	Date
Košice, Slovakia	August 31, 2004
Banská Bystrica, Slovakia	September 7, 2004
Žilina, Slovakia	September 14, 2004
Bratislava, Slovakia	September 21, 2004

== Divadlo (Theatre) ==
The best 100 singers from the regional auditions advanced to Divadlo (Theatre). The contestants first emerged on stage in groups of 9 or 10 and performed a solo unaccompanied. Those who did not impress the judges were eliminated after the group members finished their individual performances. The remaining contestants then formed same-sex trios and had to perform given songs accompanied with piano. The female trios sang "Modrá" by Jana Kirschner, the male trios performed "Voda, čo ma drží nad vodou" by Elán. The best 50 contestants made it to the semi-finals.

== Semi-finals ==
The 50 contestants who reached this stage were referred to in the show as the semi-finalists. They were divided into groups of 10 and performed live from the studio. From each group, two people advanced to the final round, based on viewers' votes. Below are the five semi-final groups with contestants listed in their performance order.

=== Group 1 ===
Order	Contestant	Song (original artist)	Result
1	Radka Tomášková	"Diaľkové ovládanie" (Katarína Knechtová)	Eliminated
2	Jana Ferenčíková	"I Will Always Love You" (Whitney Houston)	Eliminated
3	Robo Mikla	"Let Me Entertain You" (Robbie Williams)	Advanced
4	Mária Mladosievičová	"Stop!" (Sam Brown)	Eliminated
5	Monika Zázrivcová	"I Bruise Easily" (Natasha Bedingfield)	Wild Card
6	Adam Ďurica	"Opri sa o mňa" (IMT Smile)	Wild Card
7	Marián Fatrsík	"Let It Be" (The Beatles)	Eliminated
8	Mária Petríková	"Tam kde sa naumiera" (Zuzana Smatanová)	Eliminated
9	Samuel Tomeček	"Wherever You Will Go" (The Calling)	Advanced
10	Jana Čonková	"My Immortal" (Evanescence)	Eliminated

=== Group 2 ===
Order	Contestant	Song (original artist)	Result
1	Michaela Mrúzová	"Čo o mne vieš" (Dara Rolins)	Eliminated
2	Petra Humeňanská	"Black Velvet" (Alannah Myles)	Advanced
3	Igor Belaj	"Vo veľkej škole dní" (Tublatanka)	Eliminated
4	Martin Kelecsényi	"Feel" (Robbie Williams)	Advanced
5	Saskia Šipošová	"Like a Prayer" (Madonna)	Eliminated
6	Katka Svrčeková	"These Words" (Natasha Bedingfield)	Eliminated
7	Mário Dvorský	"Love Me Tender" (Elvis Presley)	Eliminated
8	Rastislav Majerech	"Every Breath You Take" (The Police)	Eliminated
9	Zdenka Menšíková	"Don't Speak" (No Doubt)	Eliminated
10	Jana Mutňanská	"Out of Reach" (Gabrielle)	Eliminated

=== Group 3 ===
Order	Contestant	Song (original artist)	Result
1	Zuzana Krivošíková	"Flashdance... What a Feeling" (Irene Cara)	Eliminated
2	Eva Gažová	"My Love Is Your Love" (Whitney Houston)	Wild Card
3	Zdenka Predná	"Can't Take My Eyes Off You" (Lauryn Hill)	Advanced
4	Peter Kotuľa	"With or Without You" (U2)	Wild Card
5	Žaneta Ozaniaková	"Underneath Your Clothes" (Shakira)	Eliminated
6	Silvia Ménová	"What Happens Tomorrow" (Duran Duran)	Eliminated
7	Zachariáš Hubáček	"Lovesong" (Pavol Habera)	Wild Card
8	Martin Lebek	"My Love" (Westlife)	Eliminated
9	Daniel Gábriš	"Dnes je skvelý deň" (Gladiátor)	Eliminated
10	Katarína Koščová	"Rome Wasn't Built in a Day" (Morcheeba)	Advanced

=== Group 4 ===
Order	Contestant	Song (original artist)	Result
1	Júlia Smolková	"Killing Me Softly" (Alicia Keys)	Eliminated
2	Lucia Radecká	"Easy to Be Hard" (Hair (musical))	Eliminated
3	Peter Konček	"I Believe I Can Fly" (R. Kelly)	Advanced
4	Tomáš Bezdeda	"Malý princ" (Aya)	Advanced
5	Zuzka Cibová	"Posledná" (Jana Kirschner)	Eliminated
6	Jaroslav Závodský	"Everybody Hurts" (R.E.M.)	Eliminated
7	Tünde Gogolová	"The Power of Love" (Laura Branigan)	Eliminated
8	Nina Pavlovičová	"I Will Survive" (Gloria Gaynor)	Eliminated
9	Andrej Vršanský	"Feel" (Robbie Williams)	Eliminated
10	Marta Szábóová	"The Winner Takes It All" (ABBA)	Eliminated

=== Group 5 ===
Order	Contestant	Song (original artist)	Result
1	Dodo Mikulášik	"Against All Odds" (Phil Collins)	Eliminated
2	Jozef Šivák	"Back for Good" (Take That)	Eliminated
3	Marek Kravjar	"Milovanie v daždi" (Richard Müller)	Eliminated
4	Monika Vojtková	"I Don't Know How to Love Him" (Yvonne Elliman)	Eliminated
5	Richard Vida	"Just A Gigolo" (Lou Bega)	Eliminated
6	Simona Brezánová	"If I Ain't Got You" (Alicia Keys)	Eliminated
7	Lenka Rakárová	"Women In Love" (Barbra Streisand)	Eliminated
8	Monika Rybárová	"Sick & Tired" (Anastacia)	Eliminated
9	Miro Jaroš	"When You Say Nothing At All" (Ronan Keating)	Advanced
10	Martina Šindlerová	"Stop!" (Sam Brown)	Advanced

=== Wild Card Round ===
Contestant	Results
Adam Ďurica	Eliminated
Monika Zázrivcová	Eliminated
Zachariáš Hubáček	Eliminated
Peter Kotuľa	Advanced
Eva Gažová	Eliminated

== Finalists ==
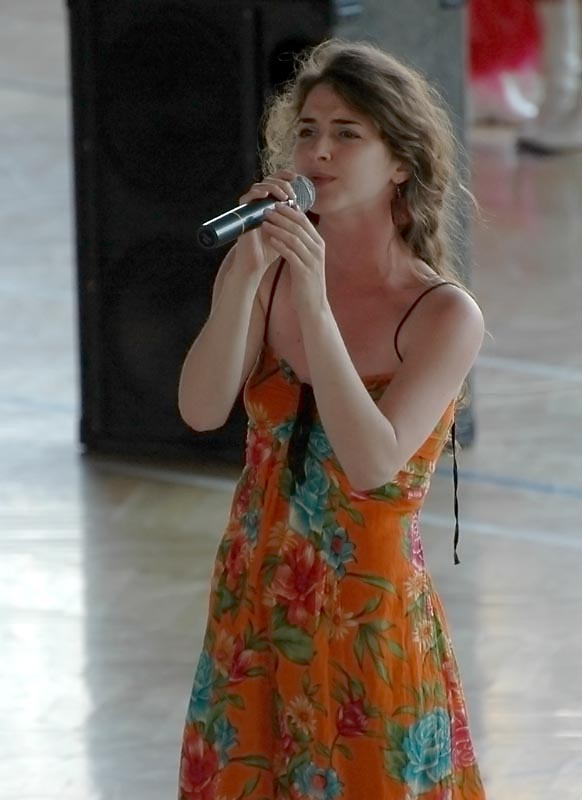
Petra Humeňanská

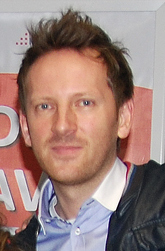
Miro Jaroš

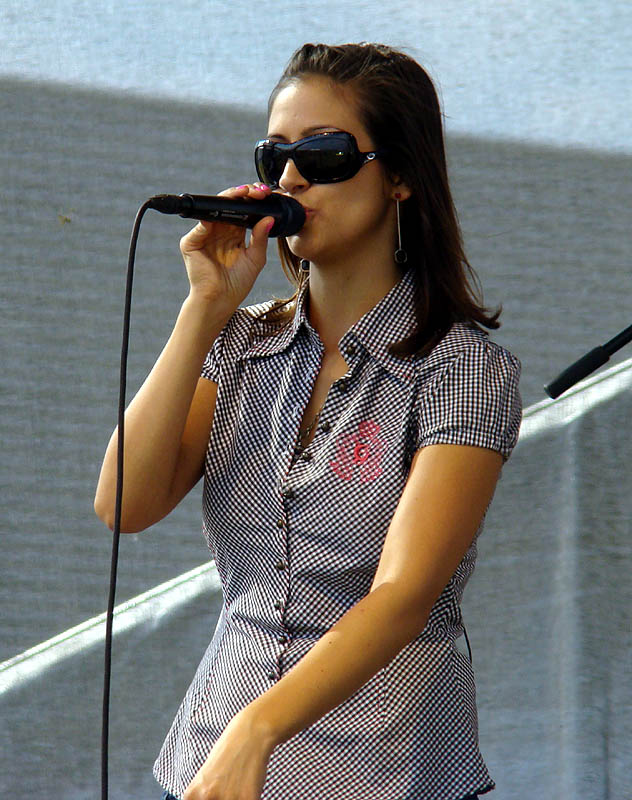
Zdenka Predná

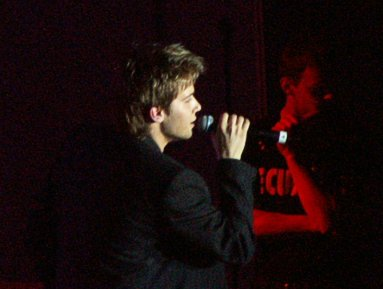
Tomáš Bezdeda

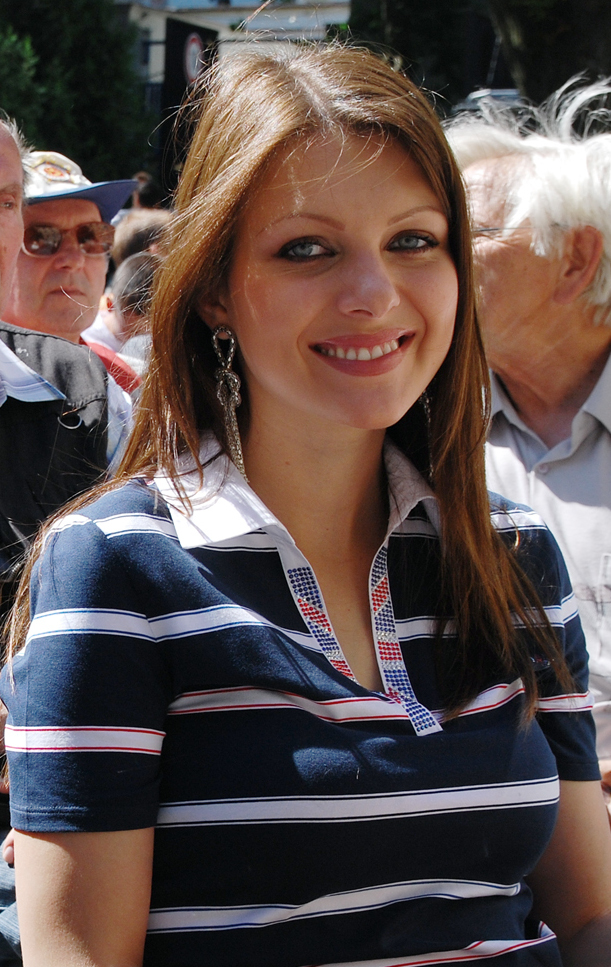
Martina Šindlerová

Contestant	Age	Hometown	Place Finished
Katarína Koščová	22	Prešov, Slovakia	Winner
Martina Šindlerová	16	Bratislava, Slovakia	Runner-up
Tomáš Bezdeda	19	Žilina, Slovakia	3rd
Zdenka Predná	20	Banská Bystrica, Slovakia	4th
Robo Mikla	22	Banská Štiavnica, Slovakia	5th
Miro Jaroš	26	Teplička nad Váhom, Slovakia	6th
Samuel Tomeček	19	Bratislava, Slovakia	7th
Peter Konček	19	Nové Zámky, Slovakia	8th
Peter Kotuľa	22	Bratislava, Slovakia	9th
Petra Humeňanská	20	Prešov, Slovakia	10th
Martin Kelecsényi	25	Bratislava, Slovakia	11th

Peter Konček died in a car accident on January 6, 2012.

== Finals ==
Eleven contestants made it to the finals. The first single recorded by TOP 11 is called "Kým vieš snívať" ("As Long as You Can Dream") and it was composed by the judge Pavol Habera (music) and a Slovak poem writer Daniel Hevier (lyrics). Each final night had its own theme. Audiences could vote for the contestants from the beginning of the show via text messages. The voting ended during the result show on the same day. The best 6 contestants later recorded another single, "Teraz je ten správny čas" ("Now It Is the Right Time").

=== Top 11 – My Idol ===
Order	Contestant	Song (original artist)	Result
1	Robo Mikla	"Kým ťa mám" (Robo Grigorov)	Safe
2	Samuel Tomeček	"It's My Life" (Bon Jovi)	Safe
3	Petra Humeňanská	"Hungry Eyes" (Eric Carmen)	Bottom 3
4	Martin Kelecsényi	"Bed of Roses" (Bon Jovi)	Eliminated
5	Zdenka Predná	"Fallin'" (Alicia Keys)	Safe
6	Katarína Koščová	"You Had Me" (Joss Stone)	Safe
7	Peter Konček	"If I Could Turn Back The Hands Of Time" (R. Kelly)	Safe
8	Tomáš Bezdeda	"Dnes" (Tublatanka)	Safe
9	Miro Jaroš	"Boro Boro" (Arash)	Safe
10	Martina Šindlerová	"Stairway To Heaven" (Led Zeppelin)	Safe
11	Peter Kotuľa	"Love's Divine" (Seal)	Bottom 3

=== Top 10 – Ballads ===
Order	Contestant	Song (original artist)	Result
1	Robo Mikla	"Knockin' on Heaven's Door" (Bob Dylan)	Safe
2	Samuel Tomeček	"You Are So Beautiful" (Joe Cocker)	Safe
3	Petra Humeňanská	"Love of My Life" (Queen)	Eliminated
4	Zdenka Predná	"Nothing Compares 2 U" (Sinéad O'Connor)	Safe
5	Katarína Koščová	"Little Sister" (Jana Kirschner)	Safe
6	Peter Konček	"In A Rush" (Blackstreet)	Bottom 3
7	Tomáš Bezdeda	"Tears in Heaven" (Eric Clapton)	Safe
8	Miro Jaroš	"L’Aurora" (Eros Ramazzotti)	Safe
9	Martina Šindlerová	"Je t'aime" (Lara Fabian)	Safe
10	Peter Kotuľa	"Mandy" (Barry Manilow)	Bottom 3

=== Top 9 – 1970s Disco ===
Order	Contestant	Song (original artist)	Result
1	Robo Mikla	"You're the First, the Last, My Everything" (Barry White)	Bottom 3
2	Samuel Tomeček	"I Was Made for Lovin' You" (Kiss)	Bottom 3
3	Zdenka Predná	"I Will Survive" (Gloria Gaynor)	Safe
4	Katarína Koščová	"We Are Family" (Sister Sledge)	Safe
5	Peter Konček	"Kung Fu Fighting" (Carl Douglas)	Safe
6	Tomáš Bezdeda	"When You're in Love with a Beautiful Woman" (Dr. Hook & the Medicine Show)	Safe
7	Miro Jaroš	"Love Is in the Air" (John Paul Young)	Safe
8	Martina Šindlerová	"Hot Stuff" (Donna Summer)	Safe
9	Peter Kotuľa	"Y.M.C.A." (Village People)	Eliminated

=== Top 8 – Hits of Year 2004 ===
Order	Contestant	Song (original artist)	Result
1	Robo Mikla	"Exotica" (I.M.T. Smile)	Safe
2	Samuel Tomeček	"Behind Blue Eyes" (Limp Bizkit)	Bottom 3
3	Zdenka Predná	"These Words" (Natasha Bedingfield)	Bottom 3
4	Katarína Koščová	"Powerless (Say What You Want)" (Nelly Furtado)	Safe
5	Peter Konček	"Carwash" (Christina Aguilera)	Eliminated
6	Tomáš Bezdeda	"Hľadám" (No Name)	Safe
7	Miro Jaroš	"Not in Love" (Enrique Iglesias)	Safe
8	Martina Šindlerová	"Left Outside Alone" (Anastacia)	Safe

=== Top 7 – Rock Edition ===
Order	Contestant	Song (original artist)	Result
1	Robo Mikla	"Rebel Yell" (Billy Idol)	Bottom 3
2	Samuel Tomeček	"Wherever You Will Go" (The Calling)	Eliminated
3	Zdenka Predná	"What's Up?" (4 Non Blondes)	Safe
4	Katarína Koščová	"You Oughta Know" (Alanis Morissette)	Safe
5	Tomáš Bezdeda	"Reklama na ticho" (TEAM)	Safe
6	Miro Jaroš	"Enjoy the Silence" (Depeche Mode)	Bottom 3
7	Martina Šindlerová	"Weak" (Skunk Anansie)	Safe

=== Top 6 – Duets ===
Order	Contestant	Song (original artist)	Result
1	Katarína Koščová & Zdenka Predná	"Say Say Say" (Michael Jackson & Paul McCartney)	N/A
2	Miro Jaroš & Robo Mikla	"Senza una donna" (Zucchero and Paul Young)	N/A
3	Martina Šindlerová & Tomáš Bezdeda	"Stumblin' In" (Suzi Quatro & Chris Norman)	N/A
4	Miro Jaroš & Katarína Koščová	"Oh Me Oh My" (Jana Kirschner & Miroslav Žbirka)	N/A
5	Zdenka Predná & Tomáš Bezdeda	"V slepých uličkách" (Marika Gombitová & Miroslav Žbirka)	N/A
6	Martina Šindlerová & Robo Mikla	"Pár dní" (Desmod & Zuzana Smatanová)	N/A
7	Katarína Koščová & Martina Šindlerová	"The Shoop Shoop Song" (Cher)	N/A
8	Zdenka Prená & Miro Jaroš	"7 Seconds" (Youssou N'Dour & Neneh Cherry)	N/A
9	Tomáš Bezdeda & Robo Mikla	"Ó Maňo" (Ján Kuric & Věra Bílá)	N/A

Contestant	Results
Robo Mikla	Bottom 3
Zdenka Predná	Safe
Katarína Koščová	Bottom 3
Tomáš Bezdeda	Safe
Miro Jaroš	Eliminated
Martina Šindlerová	Safe

=== Top 5 – The Beatles vs Elvis Presley ===
Order	Contestant	Song (original artist)	Result
1	Robo Mikla	N/A	Withdrew
2	Zdenka Predná	"Twist and Shout" (The Beatles)	Safe
3	Katarína Koščová	"I Saw Her Standing There" (The Beatles)	Safe
4	Tomáš Bezdeda	"She Loves You" (The Beatles)	Safe
5	Martina Šindlerová	"Oh! Darling" (The Beatles)	Safe
6	Robo Mikla	N/A	Withdrew
7	Zdenka Predná	"Hound Dog" (Elvis Presley)	Safe
8	Katarína Koščová	"Jailhouse Rock" (Elvis Presley)	Safe
9	Tomáš Bezdeda	"Always on My Mind" (Elvis Presley)	Safe
10	Martina Šindlerová	"My Way" (Elvis Presley)	Safe

=== Top 4 – Slovak Hits ===
Order	Contestant	Song (original artist)	Result
1	Zdenka Predná	"Slnečná balada" (Peha)	Eliminated
2	Katarína Koščová	"Tam kde sa neumiera" (Zuzana Smatanová)	Safe
3	Tomáš Bezdeda	"Poďme sa zachrániť" (Peter Nagy)	Safe
4	Martina Šindlerová	"Chlap z kríža" (Szidi Tobias)	Bottom 2
5	Zdenka Predná	"Študentské lásky" (Marika Gombitová)	Eliminated
6	Katarína Koščová	"Pomätená" (Marika Gombitová)	Safe
7	Tomáš Bezdeda	"Voda, čo ma drží nad vodou" (Elán)	Safe
8	Martina Šindlerová	"Vyznanie" (Marika Gombitová)	Bottom 2

=== Top 3 – Swing ===
Order	Contestant	Song (original artist)	Result
1	Katarína Koščová	"Sing, Sing, Sing (With a Swing)" (Louis Prima)	Safe
2	Tomáš Bezdeda	"They Can't Take That Away from Me" (Fred Astaire)	Eliminated
3	Martina Šindlerová	"Over the Rainbow" (Judy Garland)	Safe
4	Katarína Koščová	"Summertime" (Abbie Mitchell)	Safe
5	Tomáš Bezdeda	"Theme from New York, New York" (Frank Sinatra)	Eliminated
6	Martina Šindlerová	"It's Only a Paper Moon" (Ella Fitzgerald)	Safe
7	Katarína Koščová	"Cheek to Cheek" (Ginger Rogers)	Safe
8	Tomáš Bezdeda	"Blue Moon" (Mel Tormé)	Eliminated
9	Martina Šindlerová	"I Got Rhythm" (Judy Garland)	Safe

=== Top 2 – Grand Final ===
Order	Contestant	Song (original artist)	Result
1	Katarína Koščová	"Rome Wasn't Built in a Day" (Morcheeba)	Winner
2	Martina Šindlerová	"Left Outside Alone" (Anastacia)	Runner-up
3	Katarína Koščová	"You Oughta Know" (Alanis Morissette)	Winner
4	Martina Šindlerová	"Je t´aime" (Lara Fabian)	Runner-up
5	Katarína Koščová	"Najkrajšia SMS-ka" (Winner Song)	Winner
6	Martina Šindlerová	"Najkrajšia SMS-ka" (Winner Song)	Runner-up
7	Martina Šindlerová & Katarína Koščová	"Zasvieť" (TOP 2 Song)	N/A

== Elimination chart ==
Legend
Female	Male	Top 50	Wild Card	Top 11	Winner

Did Not Perform	Safe	Safe First	Safe Last	Eliminated

Stage:		Semi Finals					Wild Card	Finals									
Week:		12/17	12/23	12/31	1/7	1/14	1/15	1/28	2/4	2/11	2/18	2/25	3/11	3/18	4/1	4/8	4/15
Place	Contestant	Result															
1	Katarína Koščová			Safe (1st)				Safe	Safe	Safe	Safe	Safe	Bottom 3	Safe	Safe	Safe	Winner
2	Martina Šindlerová					Safe (2nd)		Safe	Safe	Safe	Safe	Safe	Safe	Safe	Bottom 2	Safe	Runner-up
3	Tomáš Bezdeda				Safe (2nd)			Safe	Safe	Safe	Safe	Safe	Safe	Safe	Safe	Eliminated	
4	Zdenka Predná			Safe (2nd)				Safe	Safe	Safe	Bottom 3	Safe	Safe	Safe	Eliminated		
5	Róbert Mikla	Safe (2nd)						Safe	Safe	Bottom 3	Safe	Bottom 2	Bottom 2	Withdrew			
6	Miro Jaroš					Safe (1st)		Safe	Safe	Safe	Safe	Bottom 3	Eliminated				
7	Samuel Tomeček	Safe (1st)						Safe	Safe	Bottom 2	Bottom 2	Eliminated					
8	Peter Konček				Safe (1st)			Safe	Bottom 3	Safe	Eliminated						
9	Peter Kotuľa			Wild Card			Safe	Bottom 3	Bottom 2	Eliminated							
10	Petra Humeňanská		Safe (1st)					Bottom 2	Eliminated								
11	Martin Kelecsényi		Safe (2nd)					Eliminated									
Wild; Card	Monika Zázrivcová	Wild Card					Eliminated										
Wild; Card	Adam Ďurica	Wild Card					Eliminated										
Wild; Card	Eva Gažová			Wild Card			Eliminated										
Wild; Card	Zachariáš Hubáček			Wild Card			Eliminated										
Semi- Final 5	Monika Rybárová					Eliminated											
Semi- Final 5	Lenka Rakárová					Eliminated											
Semi- Final 5	Simona Brezánová					Eliminated											
Semi- Final 5	Richard Vida					Eliminated											
Semi- Final 5	Monika Vojtková					Eliminated											
Semi- Final 5	Marek Kravjar					Eliminated											
Semi- Final 5	Jozef Šivák					Eliminated											
Semi- Final 5	Dodo Mikulášik					Eliminated											
Semi- Final 4	Andrej Vršanský				Eliminated												
Semi- Final 4	Marta Szábóová				Eliminated												
Semi- Final 4	Nina Pavlovičová				Eliminated												
Semi- Final 4	Jaroslav Závodský				Eliminated												
Semi- Final 4	Tünde Gogolová				Eliminated												
Semi- Final 4	Zuzana Cibová				Eliminated												
Semi- Final 4	Lucia Radecká				Eliminated												
Semi- Final 4	Júlia Smolková				Eliminated												
Semi- Final 3	Zuzana Krivošíková			Eliminated													
Semi- Final 3	Žaneta Ozaniaková			Eliminated													
Semi- Final 3	Martin Lebek			Eliminated													
Semi- Final 3	Daniel Gábriš			Eliminated													
Semi- Final 3	Silvia Ménová			Eliminated													
Semi- Final 2	Michaela Mrúzová		Eliminated														
Semi- Final 2	Saskia Šipošová		Eliminated														
Semi- Final 2	Katarína Svrčeková		Eliminated														
Semi- Final 2	Zdenka Menšíková		Eliminated														
Semi- Final 2	Jana Mutňanská		Eliminated														
Semi- Final 2	Mário Dvorský		Eliminated														
Semi- Final 2	Rastislav Majerech		Eliminated														
Semi- Final 2	Igor Belaj		Eliminated														
Semi- Final 1	Radka Tomášková	Eliminated															
Semi- Final 1	Jana Ferenčíková	Eliminated															
Semi- Final 1	Mária Mladosievičová	Eliminated															
Semi- Final 1	Mária Petríková	Eliminated															
Semi- Final 1	Jana Čonková	Eliminated															
Semi- Final 1	Marián Fatrsík	Eliminated															

== Contestants who appeared on other seasons/shows ==
- Richard Vida would later be a finalist on SuperStar Search Slovakia season 2.
- Marián Fatrsík would later be a semi-finalist on SuperStar Search Slovakia season 2.
- Tünde Gogolová would later be a semi-finalist on SuperStar Search Slovakia season 2.
