= SuperStar Search Slovakia season 3 =

SuperStar Search Slovakia
- Season 3
- Hosted by: Martin Rausch; Adela Banášová
- Judges: Ladislav Lučenič; Dara Rolins; Pavol Habera
- Winner: Vierka Berkyová
- Runner-up: Dominika Mirgová
- Finals venue: Incheba Expo Arena

Release
- Original network: Markíza
- Original release: September 2 – December 16, 2007

Season chronology
- ← Previous; Season 2

SuperStar Search Slovakia (Slovak: Slovensko hľadá SuperStar) is a casting television show based on the popular British show Pop Idol. The show is a contest to determine the best young singer in Slovakia and is shown by the private TV network Markíza. The third season premiered in September 2007 with castings held in Banská Bystrica, Žilina, Bratislava and Košice.

== Regional auditions ==
Auditions were held in Bratislava, Košice, Banská Bystrica, Žilina in the summer of 2007.

Audition City	Date
Žilina, Slovakia	July 15, 2007
Banská Bystrica, Slovakia	July 22, 2007
Košice, Slovakia	July 29, 2007
Bratislava, Slovakia	August 6, 2007

== Divadlo ==
In Divadlo, there where 100 contestants. The contestants first emerged on stage in groups of 9 or 10 but performed solo unaccompanied, and those who did not impress the judges were cut after the group finished their individual performances. 22 contestants made it to the Semi-final.

== Semi-final ==
22 semifinalists were revealed in September when the show premiered on screen. Eleven boys and eleven girls competed for a spot in the top 10. In three Semifinals, the guys performed on Saturday and the girls on Sunday night. The following Monday the lowest vote getters from each gender were eliminated.

=== Top 22 - Females ===
Order	Contestant	Song (original artist)	Result
1	Vierka Berkyová	"What a Feeling" (Irene Cara)	Safe
2	Alexandra Ďurinová	"Strong Enough" (Cher)	Safe
3	Natália Hatalová	"I'm Outta Love" (Anastacia)	Safe
4	Ivana Kováčová	"The Voice Within" (Christina Aguilera)	Safe
5	Dominika Mirgová	"Rome Wasn't Built in a Day" (Morcheeba)	Safe
6	Lucia Olešová	"Unfaithful" (Rihanna)	Safe
7	Katarína Smolinská	"Nobody Knows" (Pink)	Safe
8	Dáša Šarkózyová	"Vráť mi tie hviezdy" (Beáta Dubasová)	Eliminated
9	Barbara Šulíková	"I Wanna Dance with Somebody" (Whitney Houston)	Safe
10	Katarína Talanová	"Because of You" (Kelly Clarkson)	Eliminated
11	Alex Zelezníková	"Spomaľ" (Peha)	Safe

=== Top 22 - Males ===
Order	Contestant	Song (original artist)	Result
1	Marcel Berky	"So Sick" (Ne-Yo)	Safe
2	Adam Briestenský	"Boulevard of Broken Dreams" (Green Day)	Eliminated
3	Tomáš Buranovský	"Lonely No More" (Rob Thomas)	Safe
4	Michal Chrenko	"1973" (James Blunt)	Safe
5	Martin Konrád	"Sail Away" (The Rasmus)	Safe
6	Tomáš Krak	"Klára" (Chinaski)	Safe
7	Filip Lenárth	"Otherside" (Red Hot Chili Peppers)	Safe
8	Lukáš Piala	"Feel" (Robbie Williams)	Safe
9	Peter Račko	"Every Breath You Take" (The Police)	Eliminated
10	Jozef Rakyta	"Nedá sa ujsť" (IMT Smile)	Safe
11	Róbert Šimko	"Behind Blue Eyes" (Limp Bizkit)	Safe

=== Top 18 - Females ===
Order	Contestant	Song (original artist)	Result
1	Vierka Berkyová	"I'll Be There" (Mariah Carey)	Safe
2	Alexandra Ďurinová	"Angels" (Jessica Simpson)	Eliminated
3	Natália Hatalová	"Lost Without You" (Delta Goodrem)	Safe
4	Ivana Kováčová	"I'm with You" (Avril Lavigne)	Safe
5	Dominika Mirgová	"Say It Right" (Nelly Furtado)	Safe
6	Lucia Olešová	"Baby Can I Hold You" (Tracy Chapman)	Eliminated
7	Katarína Smolinská	"What's Up?" (4 Non Blondes)	Safe
8	Barbara Šulíková	"We Are" (Ana Johnsson)	Safe
9	Alex Zelezníková	"Amnestia na neveru" (Elán)	Safe

=== Top 18 - Males ===
Order	Contestant	Song (original artist)	Result
1	Marcel Berky	"A Moment Like This" (Kelly Clarkson)	Safe
2	Tomáš Buranovský	"Beautiful" (Patrick Nuo)	Safe
3	Michal Chrenko	"Som na tebe závislý" (Desmod)	Safe
4	Martin Konrád	"Untitled" (Simple Plan)	Safe
5	Tomáš Krak	"Supreme" (Robbie Williams)	Safe
6	Filip Lenárth	"Čo ak" (IMT Smile)	Safe
7	Lukáš Piala	"Imagine" (John Lennon)	Eliminated
8	Jozef Rakyta	"My Immortal" (Evanescence)	Eliminated
9	Róbert Šimko	"Mama, I'm Coming Home" (Ozzy Osbourne)	Safe

=== Top 14 - Females ===
Order	Contestant	Song (original artist)	Result
1	Vierka Berkyová	"If I Ain't Got You" (Alicia Keys)	Safe
2	Natália Hatalová	"Saving All My Love for You" (Whitney Houston)	Safe
3	Ivana Kováčová	"Slnečný kalendár" (Marika Gombitová)	Safe
4	Dominika Mirgová	"Big Girls Don't Cry" (Fergie)	Safe
5	Katarína Smolinská	"Slnečná balada" (Peha)	Eliminated
6	Barbara Šulíková	"Hello" (Lionel Richie)	Eliminated
7	Alex Zelezníková	"One of Us" (Joan Osborne)	Safe

=== Top 14 - Males ===
Order	Contestant	Song (original artist)	Result
1	Marcel Berky	"The Greatest Love of All" (George Benson)	Safe
2	Tomáš Buranovský	"Here Without You" (3 Doors Down)	Eliminated
3	Michal Chrenko	"Shape of My Heart" (Sting)	Safe
4	Martin Konrád	"Wake Me Up When September Ends" (Green Day)	Safe
5	Tomáš Krak	"Tears in Heaven" (Eric Clapton)	Safe
6	Filip Lenárth	"Aby bolo jasné" (Desmod)	Eliminated
7	Róbert Šimko	"Láska" (Gladiátor)	Safe

=== Finalist ===
Contestant	Age	Hometown	Place Finished
Vierka Berkyová	16	Lučenec, Slovakia	Winner
Dominika Mirgová	15	Trnava, Slovakia	Runner-up
Róbert Šimko	17	Rožňava, Slovakia	3rd
Ivana Kováčová	18	Žiar nad Hronom, Slovakia	4th
Martin Konrád	15	Neded, Slovakia	5th
Marcel Berky	17	Sklabiná, Slovakia	6th
Tomáš Krak	25	Košice, Slovakia	7th
Michal Chrenko	17	Vráble, Slovakia	8th
Natália Hatalová	17	Topoľčany, Slovakia	9th
Alex Zelezníková	20	Partizánske, Slovakia	10th

=== Finals ===
Ten contestants made it to the finals. The first single recorded by the TOP 10 is called "Dotkni sa hviezd" (Touch the Stars) and it was composed by judge Pavol Habera (music) and Slovak poem writer Daniel Hevier. Every final night has its theme. Audience can vote for contestants from the very beginning of the show, voting ends during result show on the next day.

=== Top 10 – Year They Were Born ===
Order	Contestant	Song (original artist)	Result
1	Marcel Berky	"Right Here Waiting" (Richard Marx)	Safe
2	Vierka Berkyová	"Emotions" (Mariah Carey)	Safe
3	Michal Chrenko	"Poďme sa zachránit" (Peter Nagy)	Safe
4	Natália Hatalová	"All Around the World" (Lisa Stansfield)	Bottom 3
5	Dominika Mirgová	"Save the Best for Last" (Vanessa Williams)	Safe
6	Alex Zelezníková	"Heaven Is a Place on Earth" (Belinda Carlisle)	Eliminated
7	Martin Konrád	"O bláznech" (Michal Penk)	Safe
8	Róbert Šimko	"I Want It All" (Queen)	Bottom 3
9	Tomáš Krak	"Up Where We Belong" (Joe Cocker & Jennifer Warnes )	Safe
10	Ivana Kováčová	"I'm Your Baby Tonight" (Whitney Houston)	Safe

=== Top 9 – Rock ===
Order	Contestant	Song (original artist)	Result
1	Marcel Berky	"The Reason" (Hoobastank)	Bottom 3
2	Vierka Berkyová	"Don't Speak" (No Doubt)	Safe
3	Michal Chrenko	"Nepoznám" (IMT Smile)	Safe
4	Natália Hatalová	"I Love Rock 'n' Roll" (Joan Jett)	Eliminated
5	Dominika Mirgová	"Complicated" (Avril Lavigne)	Safe
6	Martin Konrád	"In the Shadows" (The Rasmus)	Bottom 3
7	Róbert Šimko	"My Sacrifice" (Creed)	Safe
8	Tomáš Krak	"Fairytale Gone Bad" (Sunrise Avenue)	Safe
9	Ivana Kováčová	"Free Your Mind" (En Vogue)	Safe

=== Top 8 – Ballads ===
Order	Contestant	Song (original artist)	Result
1	Marcel Berky	"Modlitba Lásky" (Robo Grigorov)	Bottom 3
2	Vierka Berkyová	"Anjelik môj" (Dara Rolins)	Safe
3	Michal Chrenko	"Say You, Say Me" (Lionel Richie)	Eliminated
4	Dominika Mirgová	"Stickwitu" (Pussycat Dolls)	Safe
5	Martin Konrád	"Láska drž ma nad hladinou" (Tublatanka)	Safe
6	Róbert Šimko	"Everybody Hurts" (R.E.M.)	Safe
7	Tomáš Krak	"Can You Feel The Love Tonight" (Elton John)	Safe
8	Ivana Kováčová	"Eternal Flame" (The Bangles)	Bottom 3

=== Top 7 – Dance ===
Order	Contestant	Song (original artist)	Result
1	Marcel Berky	"Because of You" (Ne-Yo)	Bottom 3
2	Vierka Berkyová	"Dancing Queen" (ABBA)	Safe
3	Dominika Mirgová	"Čo o mne vieš" (Dara Rolins)	Safe
4	Martin Konrád	"Hey! Baby" (DJ Ötzi)	Bottom 3
5	Róbert Šimko	"Sex Bomb" (Tom Jones)	Safe
6	Tomáš Krak	"Faith" (George Michael)	Eliminated
7	Ivana Kováčová	"Can't Get You Out of My Head" (Kylie Minogue)	Safe

=== Top 6 – Big Bands and Duets ===
Order	Contestant	Song (original artist)	Result
1	Marcel Berky	"Against All Odds" (Phil Collins)	Eliminated
2	Vierka Berkyová	"Lásko má já stůňu" (Helena Vondráčková)	Safe
3	Dominika Mirgová	"Unwritten" (Natasha Bedingfield)	Safe
4	Martin Konrád	"I Don't Want to Miss a Thing" (Aerosmith)	Bottom 3
5	Róbert Šimko	"The Unforgiven" (Metallica)	Safe
6	Ivana Kováčová	"Hero" (Mariah Carey)	Bottom 3
7	Róbert Šimko & Marcel Berky	"Loď ktorá sa plaví do neznáma" (Tublatanka)	N/A
8	Vierka Berkyová & Ivana Kováčová	"I'll Stand by You" (Girls Aloud)	N/A
9	Martin Konrád & Dominika Mirgová	"One" (U2 & Mary J.Blige)	N/A

=== Top 5 – Miroslav Žbirka ===
Order	Contestant	Song (original artist)	Result
1	Vierka Berkyová	"Atlantída" (Miroslav Žbirka)	Bottom 3
2	Dominika Mirgová	"Zažni" (Miroslav Žbirka)	Bottom 3
3	Martin Konrád	"Poraď si sám" (Miroslav Žbirka)	Eliminated
4	Róbert Šimko	"Mám čierny deň" (Miroslav Žbirka)	Safe
5	Ivana Kováčová	"Prvá" (Miroslav Žbirka)	Safe
6	Vierka Berkyová	"Dvaja" (Miroslav Žbirka)	Bottom 3
7	Dominika Mirgová	"Nespáľme to krásne v nás" (Miroslav Žbirka)	Bottom 3
8	Martin Konrád	"Možno sa ti zdá" (Miroslav Žbirka)	Eliminated
9	Róbert Šimko	"Cesta zakázanou rýchlosťou" (Miroslav Žbirka)	Safe
10	Ivana Kováčová	"V slepých uličkách" (Miroslav Žbirka)	Safe

=== Top 4 – Unplugged ===
Order	Contestant	Song (original artist)	Result
1	Vierka Berkyová	"Out of Reach" (Gabrielle)	Safe
2	Dominika Mirgová	"Umbrella" (Rihanna)	Bottom 2
3	Róbert Šimko	"Niekto ti to povie skôr než ja" (Desmod)	Safe
4	Ivana Kováčová	"Try" (Nelly Furtado)	Eliminated
5	Vierka Berkyová	"Killing Me Softly" (Fugees)	Safe
6	Dominika Mirgová	"Vietor" (Zdenka Predná)	Bottom 2
7	Róbert Šimko	"Fields of Gold" (Sting)	Safe
8	Ivana Kováčová	"It Must Have Been Love" (Roxette)	Eliminated

=== Top 3 – Idol's Choice ===
Order	Contestant	Song (original artist)	Result
1	Vierka Berkyová	"From Sarah with Love" (Sarah Connor)	Safe
2	Dominika Mirgová	"Knockin' on Heaven's Door" (Avril Lavigne)	Safe
3	Róbert Šimko	"Kúpim si pekný deň" (Gladiátor)	Eliminated
4	Vierka Berkyová	"Ain't That Just A Way" (Lutricia McNeal)	Safe
5	Dominika Mirgová	"Sway" (Pussycat Dolls)	Safe
6	Róbert Šimko	"How You Remind Me" (Nickelback)	Eliminated
7	Vierka Berkyová	"Viem že povieš áno" (Tina)	Safe
8	Dominika Mirgová	"Irreplaceable" (Beyoncé Knowles)	Safe
9	Róbert Šimko	"Tonight" (Reamonn)	Eliminated

=== Top 2 – Grand Final ===
Order	Contestant	Song (original artist)	Result
1	Vierka Berkyová	"Killing Me Softly" (Fugees)	Winner
2	Dominika Mirgová	"Sway" (Pussycat Dolls)	Runner-up
3	Vierka Berkyová	"Tři oříšky" (Iveta Bartošová)	Winner
4	Dominika Mirgová	"All I Want for Christmas Is You" (Mariah Carey)	Runner-up
5	Vierka Berkyová	"Angels " (Jessica Simpson)	Winner
6	Dominika Mirgová	"Angels " (Jessica Simpson)	Runner-up
7	Vierka Berkyová & Dominika Mirgová	"Dotkni sa hviezd" (TOP 10 Song)	N/A

- TOP 10 Performance: Happy Xmas (Plastic Ono Band)

== Elimination chart ==
Legend
Female	Male	Top 22	Top 10	Winner

Safe	Safe First	Safe Last	Eliminated

Stage:		Semi Finals			Finals								
Week:		10/1	10/8	10/15	10/22	10/29	11/5	11/12	11/19	11/26	12/3	12/10	12/17
Place	Contestant	Result											
1	Vierka Berkyová	Safe	Safe	Safe	Safe	Safe	Safe	Safe	Safe	Bottom 2	Safe	Safe	Winner
2	Dominika Mirgová	Safe	Safe	Safe	Safe	Safe	Safe	Safe	Safe	Bottom 3	Bottom 2	Safe	Runner-up
3	Róbert Šimko	Safe	Safe	Safe	Bottom 3	Safe	Safe	Safe	Safe	Safe	Safe	Eliminated	
4	Ivana Kováčová	Safe	Safe	Safe	Safe	Safe	Bottom 3	Safe	Bottom 3	Safe	Eliminated		
5	Martin Konrád	Safe	Safe	Safe	Safe	Bottom 3	Safe	Bottom 2	Bottom 2	Eliminated			
6	Marcel Berky	Safe	Safe	Safe	Safe	Bottom 2	Bottom 2	Bottom 3	Eliminated				
7	Tomáš Krak	Safe	Safe	Safe	Safe	Safe	Safe	Eliminated					
8	Michal Chrenko	Safe	Safe	Safe	Safe	Safe	Eliminated						
9	Natália Hatalová	Safe	Safe	Safe	Bottom 2	Eliminated							
10	Alex Zelezníková	Safe	Safe	Safe	Eliminated								
11-14	Filip Lenárth	Safe	Safe	Eliminated									
11-14	Barbara Šulíková	Safe	Safe	Eliminated									
11-14	Tomáš Buranovský	Safe	Safe	Eliminated									
11-14	Katarína Smolinská	Safe	Safe	Eliminated									
15-18	Jozef Rakyta	Safe	Eliminated										
15-18	Lucia Olešová	Safe	Eliminated										
15-18	Lukáš Piala	Safe	Eliminated										
15-18	Alexandra Ďurinová	Safe	Eliminated										
19-22	Adam Briestenský	Eliminated											
19-22	Katarína Talanová	Eliminated											
19-22	Peter Račko	Eliminated											
19-22	Dáša Šárkózyová	Eliminated											
