= SuperStar Search Slovakia season 2 =

SuperStar Search Slovakia
- Season 2
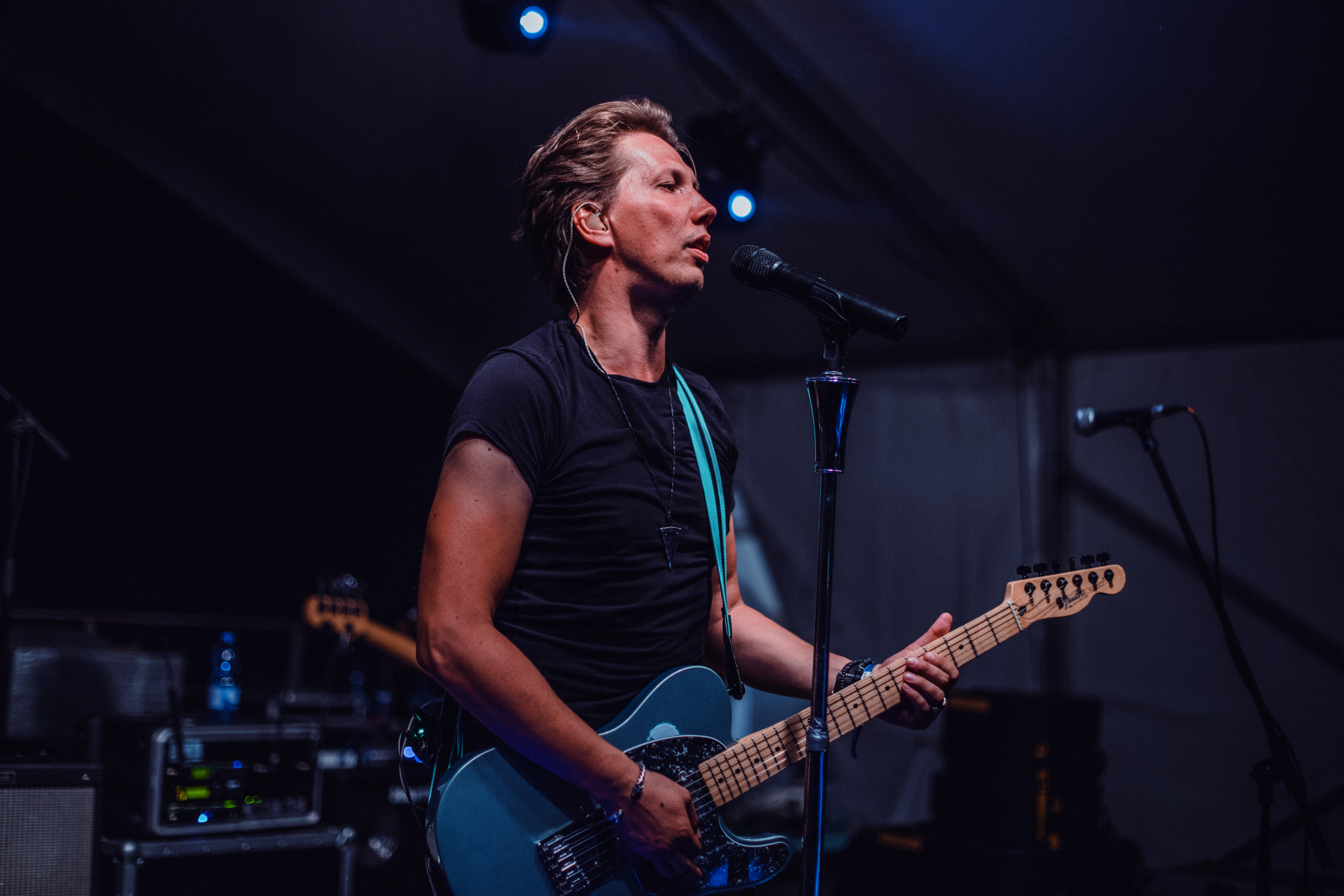
- Hosted by: Martin Rausch; Adela Banášová
- Judges: Ladislav Lučenič; Pavol Habera; Jana Hubinská; Julo Viršík
- Winner: Peter Cmorík
- Runner-up: Mária Bundová
- Finals venue: Incheba Expo Arena

Release
- Original network: STV
- Original release: November 4, 2005 – April 7, 2006

Season chronology
- ← Previous; Season 1 Next → Season 3

SuperStar Search Slovakia (Slovak: Slovensko hľadá SuperStar) is a casting television show based on the popular British show Pop Idol. The show is a contest to determine the best young singer in Slovakia and is shown by the national TV network STV. The second season premiered in November 2005 with castings held in Banská Bystrica, Žilina, Bratislava and Košice.

== Regional auditions ==
Auditions were held in Bratislava, Košice, Banská Bystrica, Žilina in the summer of 2005.

Audition City	Date
Košice, Slovakia	August 28, 2005
Banská Bystrica, Slovakia	September 3, 2005
Žilina, Slovakia	September 10, 2005
Bratislava, Slovakia	September 17, 2005

== Divadlo ==
In Divadlo were 100 contestants. The contestants first emerged on stage in groups of 9 or 10 but performed solo unaccompanied, and those who did not impress the judges were cut after the group finished their individual performances. 40 contestants made it to the Semi-final.

== Semi-final ==
The 40 contestants who reached this stage in this season were referred to in the show as the finalists. Below are the four semi-final and one Second Chance semi-final groups with contestants listed in their performance order. In each group, two people advanced to the next round, based on votes by the viewers.

=== Group 1 ===
Order	Contestant	Song (original artist)	Result
1	Peter Cmorík	"Bad Day" (Daniel Powter)	Advanced
2	Katarína Smithová	"Sleeping Satellite" (Tasmin Archer)	Eliminated
3	Dušan Marko	"Careless Whisper" (George Michael)	Eliminated
4	Veronika Adamovová	"There You'll Be" (Faith Hill)	Eliminated
5	David Zapriháč	"Easy" (Lionel Richie)	Eliminated
6	Ivan Štroffek	"You're Beautiful" (James Blunt)	Second Chance
7	Matej Koreň	"Kúpim si pekný deň" (Gladiátor)	Advanced
8	Jana Kozáková	"Stand By Me" (4 The Cause)	Eliminated
9	Marianna Demčáková	"I Believe" (Joana Zimmer)	Second Chance
10	Sanija Azizi	"Voda živá" (Aneta Langerová)	Eliminated

=== Group 2 ===
Order	Contestant	Song (original artist)	Result
1	Mária Bundová	"Change" (Lisa Stansfield)	Advanced
2	Andreas Imrich	"Wonderwall" (Oasis)	Eliminated
3	Magdaléna Krajčovičová	"The Voice Within" (Christina Aguilera)	Eliminated
4	Peter Lacho	"Sorry Seems to Be the Hardest Word" (Elton John)	Second Chance
5	Kristína Zakuciová	"Sweet Dreams" (Eurythmics)	Eliminated
6	Lenka Kvaková	"The Best" (Tina Turner)	Advanced
7	Júlia Vassová	"The Shoop Shoop Song" (Cher)	Eliminated
8	Petra Halušková	"All by Myself" (Céline Dion)	Eliminated
9	Michal Cabala	"Love's Divine" (Seal)	Second Chance
10	Ivana Fabiánová	"Ironic" (Alanis Morissette)	Eliminated

=== Group 3 ===
Order	Contestant	Song (original artist)	Result
1	Petra Kepeňová	"This Love" (Maroon 5)	Second Chance
2	Alexandra Okálová	"Beautiful" (Christina Aguilera)	Second Chance
3	Martin Krausz	"Can You Feel the Love Tonight" (Elton John)	Advanced
4	Peter Bažík	"Crazy" (Seal)	Second Chance
5	Paulína Opatřilová	"Walking on Broken Glass" (Annie Lennox)	Eliminated
6	Ľubomír Miča	"She's So High" (Kurt Nielsen)	Second Chance
7	Mikuláš Bocko	"Hard to Say I'm Sorry" (Chicago)	Eliminated
8	Martin Molent	"It's My Life" (Bon Jovi)	Eliminated
9	Peter Černý	"Nepoznám" (IMT Smile)	Eliminated
10	Jakub Petraník	"Angels" (Robbie Williams)	Advanced

=== Group 4 ===
Order	Contestant	Song (original artist)	Result
1	Jana Čonková	"Angels" (Robbie Williams)	Second Chance
2	Jana Mútňanská	"Can't Fight the Moonlight" (LeAnn Rimes)	Eliminated
3	Tünde Gogolová	"I'm So Excited" (Pointer Sisters)	Eliminated
4	Viliam Mego	"Láska" (Gladiátor)	Eliminated
5	Rastislav Petkáč	"One" (U2)	Eliminated
6	Richard Vida	"Hello" (Lionel Richie)	Advanced
7	Marián Fatrsík	"Balada o poľných vtákoch" (Miroslav Žbirka)	Second Chance
8	Katarína Svrčeková	"Wild Horses" (Natasha Bedingfield)	Eliminated
9	Barbora Balúchová	"Without You" (Mariah Carey)	Advanced
10	Soňa Kardošová	"Butterflies" (Alicia Keys)	Eliminated

=== Second Chance ===
Order	Contestant	Song (original artist)	Result
1	Ľubomír Miča	"Love Song" (Pavol Habera)	Eliminated
2	Marianna Demčáková	"What a Feeling" (Irene Cara)	Eliminated
3	Peter Lacho	"Opri sa o mňa" (IMT Smile)	Eliminated
4	Marián Fatrsík	"Can You Feel the Love Tonight" (Elton John)	Eliminated
5	Jana Čonková	"Don't Speak" (No Doubt)	Eliminated
6	Petra Kepeňová	"Against All Odds" (Phil Collins)	Wild Card
7	Ivan Štroffek	"Let Me Entertain You" (Robbie Williams)	Advanced
8	Michal Cabala	"Wherever You Will Go" (The Calling)	Eliminated
9	Alexandra Okálová	"Black Velvet" (Alannah Myles)	Wild Card
10	Peter Bažík	"It's My Life" (Bon Jovi)	Advanced

=== Wild Card Round ===
Contestant	Results
Petra Kepeňová	Advanced
Alexandra Okálová	Eliminated

=== Finalist ===
Contestant	Age	Hometown	Place Finished
Peter Cmorík	25	Veľký Krtíš, Slovakia	Winner
Mária Bundová	27	Bratislava, Slovakia	Runner-up
Ivan Štroffek	21	Kremnica, Slovakia	3rd
Peter Bažík	18	Habovka, Slovakia	4th
Martin Krausz	19	Čaňa, Slovakia	5th
Barbora Balúchová	17	Malacky, Slovakia	6th
Petra Kepeňová	22	Rimavská Sobota, Slovakia	7th
Jakub Petraník	17	Prešov, Slovakia	8th
Matej Koreň	19	Rapovce, Slovakia	9th
Richard Vida	22	Svätý Peter, Slovakia	10th
Lenka Kvaková	21	Malá Ida, Slovakia	11th

=== Finals ===
Eleven contestants made it to the finals. The first single recorded by TOP 11 is called "So mnou môžeš rátať" (You can count on with me) and it was composed by judge Pavol Habera (music) and Slovak poem writer Daniel Hevier. Every final night has its theme. Audience can vote for contestants from the very beginning of the show, voting ends during result show on the same day.

=== Top 11 – My Idol ===
Order	Contestant	Song (original artist)	Result
1	Peter Cmorík	"On My Head" (Dan Bárta)	Safe
2	Matej Koreň	"When You Say Nothing At All" (Ronan Keating)	Bottom 3
3	Mária Bundová	"Strong Enough" (Cher)	Safe
4	Lenka Kvaková	"I'm Alive" (Céline Dion)	Eliminated
5	Jakub Petraník	"Posledná" (Desmod)	Safe
6	Martin Krausz	"Otherside" (Red Hot Chili Peppers)	Bottom 3
7	Barbora Balúchová	"I Wanna Dance with Somebody" (Whitney Houston)	Safe
8	Richard Vida	"Careless Whisper" (George Michael)	Safe
9	Peter Bažík	"Real to Me" (Brian McFadden)	Safe
10	Ivan Štroffek	"Walk On" (U2)	Safe
11	Petra Kepeňová	"That Don't Impress Me Much" (Shania Twain)	Safe

=== Top 10 – Elán ===
Order	Contestant	Song (original artist)	Result
1	Peter Cmorík	"Čaba neblázni" (Elán)	Safe
2	Matej Koreň	"Zanedbaný sex" (Elán)	Safe
3	Mária Bundová	"Nie sme zlí" (Elán)	Bottom 3
4	Jakub Petraník	"Ulica" (Elán)	Safe
5	Martin Krausz	"Kaskadér" (Elán)	Safe
6	Barbora Balúchová	"Neviem byť sám" (Elán)	Safe
7	Richard Vida	"Sestrička z Kramárov" (Elán)	Eliminated
8	Peter Bažík	"Láska moja" (Elán)	Safe
9	Ivan Štroffek	"Tisíc a jeden krát" (Elán)	Safe
10	Petra Kepeňová	"Telo si somnou robí, čo chce" (Elán)	Bottom 3

=== Top 9 – Disco ===
Order	Contestant	Song (original artist)	Result
1	Peter Cmorík	"Celebration" (Kool & The Gang)	Safe
2	Matej Koreň	"Sunrise" (Simply Red)	Eliminated
3	Mária Bundová	"Waiting For Tonight" (Jennifer Lopez)	Safe
4	Jakub Petraník	"Rock DJ" (Robbie Williams)	Bottom 3
5	Martin Krausz	"Sex Bomb" (Tom Jones)	Safe
6	Barbora Balúchová	"Only If I" (Kate Ryan)	Safe
7	Peter Bažík	"Escape" (Enrique Iglesias)	Safe
8	Ivan Štroffek	"Rock Your Body" (Justin Timberlake)	Safe
9	Petra Kepeňová	"Non-stop" (Michal David)	Bottom 3

=== Top 8 – Big Band ===
Order	Contestant	Song (original artist)	Result
1	Peter Cmorík	"You Can Leave Your Hat On" (Joe Cocker)	Safe
2	Mária Bundová	"Private Dancer" (Tina Turner)	Safe
3	Jakub Petraník	"Easy" (Faith No More)	Eliminated
4	Martin Krausz	"I Just Called to Say I Love You" (Stevie Wonder)	Bottom 3
5	Barbora Balúchová	"Crazy Chick" (Charlotte Church)	Safe
6	Peter Bažík	"Save the Last Dance for Me" (Michael Bublé)	Safe
7	Ivan Štroffek	"Satisfaction" (Rolling Stones)	Safe
8	Petra Kepeňová	"Rome Wasn't Built in a Day" (Morcheeba)	Bottom 3

=== Top 7 – Rock ===
Order	Contestant	Song (original artist)	Result
1	Peter Cmorík	"Summer of '69" (Bryan Adams)	Safe
2	Mária Bundová	"Still Got The Blues" (Garry Moore)	Bottom 3
3	Martin Krausz	"Fly Away" (Lenny Kravitz)	Bottom 3
4	Barbora Balúchová	"Ironic" (Alanis Morissette)	Safe
5	Peter Bažík	"Bez teba nemôžem dýchať" (Gladiátor)	Safe
6	Ivan Štroffek	"Livin' on the Edge" (Aerosmith)	Safe
7	Petra Kepeňová	"Every Breath You Take" (The Police)	Eliminated

=== Top 6 – Duets ===
Order	Contestant	Song (original artist)	Result
1	Peter Cmorík & Barbora Balúchová	"Kids" (Robbie Williams & Kylie Minogue)	N/A
2	Ivan Štroffek & Peter Cmorík	"All for Love" (Bryan Adams, Rod Stewart and Sting)	N/A
3	Peter Cmorík & Mária Bundová	"Don't Go Breaking My Heart" (Elton John & Kiki Dee)	N/A
4	Mária Bundová & Peter Bažík	"Especially for You" (Jason Donovan & Kylie Minogue)	N/A
5	Martin Krausz & Mária Bundová	"The Time Of My Life" (Bill Medley & Jennifer Warnes)	N/A
6	Martin Krausz & Barbora Balúchová	"Pár dní" (Desmod & Zuzana Smatanová)	N/A
7	Peter Bažík & Ivan Štroffek	"Sorry Seems To Be The Hardest Word" (Elton John)	N/A
8	Peter Bažík & Martin Krausz	"Ľudia nie sú zlí" (IMT Smile)	N/A
9	Barbora Balúchová & Ivan Štroffek	"Everything Burns" (Anastacia & Ben Moody)	N/A

Contestant	Results
Peter Cmorík	Safe
Mária Bundová	Bottom 3
Martin Krausz	Bottom 3
Barbora Balúchová	Eliminated
Peter Bažík	Safe
Ivan Štroffek	Safe

=== Top 5 – Hits of Year 2005 ===
Order	Contestant	Song (original artist)	Result
1	Peter Cmorík	"Sunday Morning" (Maroon 5)	Safe
2	Mária Bundová	"If There's Any Justice" (Lemar)	Safe
3	Martin Krausz	"Tabáček" (Chinaski)	Eliminated
4	Peter Bažík	"Nemám čo stratiť" (TEAM)	Bottom 3
5	Ivan Štroffek	"Speed of Sound" (Coldplay)	Bottom 3
6	Peter Cmorík	"Photograph" (Nickelback)	Safe
7	Mária Bundová	"Crazy" (Alanis Morissette)	Safe
8	Martin Krausz	"Myslím, že môže byť" (IMT Smile)	Eliminated
9	Peter Bažík	"Incomplete" (Backstreet Boys)	Bottom 3
10	Ivan Štroffek	"What Happens Tomorrow" (Duran Duran)	Bottom 3

=== Top 4 – Legends vs Legends ===
Order	Contestant	Song (original artist)	Result
1	Peter Cmorík	"I Still Haven't Found What I'm Looking For" (U2)	Safe
2	Mária Bundová	"One" (U2)	Safe
3	Peter Bažík	"With Or Without You" (U2)	Eliminated
4	Ivan Štroffek	"Beautiful Day" (U2)	Bottom 2
5	Peter Cmorík	"Angels" (Robbie Williams)	Safe
6	Mária Bundová	"She's the One" (Robbie Williams)	Safe
7	Peter Bažík	"Feel" (Robbie Williams)	Eliminated
4	Ivan Štroffek	"Come Undone" (Robbie Williams)	Bottom 2

=== Top 3 – Unplugged ===
Order	Contestant	Song (original artist)	Result
1	Peter Cmorík	"Soldier Of Fortune" (Deep Purple)	Safe
2	Mária Bundová	"Black Horse and the Cherry Tree" (KT Tunstall)	Safe
3	Ivan Štroffek	"Come as You Are" (Nirvana)	Eliminated
4	Peter Cmorík	"Nothing Else Matters" (Metallica)	Safe
5	Mária Bundová	"The Real Thing" (Lisa Stansfield)	Safe
6	Ivan Štroffek	"Chci zas v tobě spát" (Lucie)	Eliminated
7	Peter Cmorík	"Hotel California" (Eagles)	Safe
8	Mária Bundová	"Another Day In Paradise" (Brandy Norwood)	Safe
9	Ivan Štroffek	"Don't Look Back In Anger" (Oasis)	Eliminated

=== Top 2 – Grand Final ===
Order	Contestant	Song (original artist)	Result
1	Peter Cmorík	"Bad Day" (Daniel Powter)	Winner
2	Mária Bundová	"Change" (Lisa Stansfield)	Runner-up
3	Peter Cmorík	"On My Head" (Dan Bárta)	Winner
4	Mária Bundová	"If There's Any Justice" (Lemar)	Runner-up
5	Peter Cmorík	"Nič nie je stratené" (Winner Song)	Winner
6	Mária Bundová	"Nič nie je stratené" (Winner Song)	Runner-up
7	Peter Cmorík & Mária Bundová	"Don't Go Breaking My Heart" (Elton John & Kiki Dee)	N/A

== Elimination chart ==
Legend
Female	Male	Top 40	Wild Card	Top 11	Winner

Did Not Perform	Safe	Safe First	Safe Last	Eliminated

Stage:		Semi Finals					Wild Card	Finals									
Week:		12/23	12/30	1/6	1/13	1/20	1/27	2/3	2/10	2/17	2/24	3/3	3/10	3/17	3/24	3/31	4/7
Place	Contestant	Result															
1	Peter Cmorík	Safe (1st)						Safe	Safe	Safe	Safe	Safe	Safe	Safe	Safe	Safe	Winner
2	Mária Bundová		Safe (1st)					Safe	Bottom 3	Safe	Safe	Bottom 3	Bottom 2	Safe	Safe	Safe	Runner-up
3	Ivan Štroffek	Elim				Safe (2nd)		Safe	Safe	Safe	Safe	Safe	Safe	Bottom 2	Bottom 2	Eliminated	
4	Peter Bažík			Elim		Safe (1st)		Safe	Safe	Safe	Safe	Safe	Safe	Bottom 3	Eliminated		
5	Martin Krausz			Safe (2nd)				Bottom 3	Safe	Safe	Bottom 3	Bottom 3	Bottom 3	Eliminated			
6	Barbora Balúchová				Safe (1st)			Safe	Safe	Safe	Safe	Safe	Eliminated				
7	Petra Kepeňová			Elim		Wild Card	Safe	Safe	Bottom 2	Bottom 2	Bottom 2	Eliminated					
8	Jakub Petraník			Safe (1st)				Safe	Safe	Bottom 3	Eliminated						
9	Matej Koreň	Safe (2nd)						Bottom 2	Safe	Eliminated							
10	Richard Vida				Safe (2nd)			Safe	Eliminated								
11	Lenka Kvaková		Safe (2nd)					Eliminated									
12	Alexandra Okálová			Elim		Wild Card	Eliminated										
Semi- Final 5	Ľubomír Miča			Elim		Eliminated											
Semi- Final 5	Marianna Demčáková	Elim				Eliminated											
Semi- Final 5	Peter Lacho		Elim			Eliminated											
Semi- Final 5	Marián Fatrsík				Elim	Eliminated											
Semi- Final 5	Jana Čonková				Elim	Eliminated											
Semi- Final 5	Michal Cabala		Elim			Eliminated											
Semi- Final 4	Jana Mútňanská				Eliminated												
Semi- Final 4	Tünde Gogolová				Eliminated												
Semi- Final 4	Viliam Mego				Eliminated												
Semi- Final 4	Rastislav Petkáč				Eliminated												
Semi- Final 4	Katarína Svrčeková				Eliminated												
Semi- Final 4	Soňa Kardošová				Eliminated												
Semi- Final 3	Paulína Opatřilová			Eliminated													
Semi- Final 3	Mikuláš Bocko			Eliminated													
Semi- Final 3	Martin Molent			Eliminated													
Semi- Final 3	Peter Černý			Eliminated													
Semi- Final 2	Magdaléna Krajčovičová		Eliminated														
Semi- Final 2	Andreas Imrich		Eliminated														
Semi- Final 2	Kristína Zakuciová		Eliminated														
Semi- Final 2	Júlia Vassová		Eliminated														
Semi- Final 2	Petra Halušková		Eliminated														
Semi- Final 2	Ivana Fabiánová		Eliminated														
Semi- Final 1	Katarína Smithová	Eliminated															
Semi- Final 1	Dušan Marko	Eliminated															
Semi- Final 1	Veronika Adamcová	Eliminated															
Semi- Final 1	David Zapriháč	Eliminated															
Semi- Final 1	Jana Kozáková	Eliminated															
Semi- Final 1	Sanija Azizi	Eliminated															
