= List of people from Prešov =

This is a list of notable people from Prešov, Slovakia

== C ==
- Ivana Christová (born 1970), Slovak singer, businesswoman and former beauty queen.
- Kyla Cole (born 1978), Slovak glamour model.

== E ==
- József Eötvös (1813–1871), president of Hungarian Academy of Sciences, Minister of Educational-Cultural, lawyer, politician.

== G ==
- István Gyöngyösi (1620–1704), Hungarian poet.

== H ==
- Béla Hamvas (1897–1968), Hungarian writer, philosopher.
- Petra Humeňanská (born 1984), Slovak singer and actress.

== K ==
- Ferenc Kazinczy (1759–1831), Hungarian author, the most indefatigable agent in the regeneration of the Hungarian language and literature.
- Katarína Knechtová (born 1981), Slovak singer.
- David Kollar (born 1983), Slovak experimental guitarist and composer.
- Katarína Koščová (born 1982), Slovak singer.
- Lajos Kossuth (1802–1894), Hungarian politician, lawyer and Hungary Regent-President of in 1849.
- Juraj Kukura (born 1947), Slovak actor.

== L ==
- Peter Lipa (born 1943), Slovak singer.

== M ==
- Pál Maléter (1917–1958), Hungarian Minister of Defence, a martyr of Hungarian Revolution of 1956.
- Nadia Marcinko (born 1985), Slovak model, commercial aviation pilot and associate of Jeffrey Epstein.
- Vladimir Mihalik (born 1987), Slovak professional hockey player for the Tampa Bay Lightning (NHL).

== N ==
- Peter Nagy (born 1959), Slovak musician, singer, composer, songwriter, music producer and a photographer.

== P ==
- Lea Popovičová (born 2007), Slovak speed skater
- Ferenc Pulszky (1814–1897), Hungarian politician, archaeologist, art historian.

== R ==
- Ferenc Rákóczi (1676–1735), Hungarian prince of Transylvania.
- Albert Rusnák (born 1974), Slovak footballer.

== S ==
- Juraj Simek (born 1987), Slovak-born Swiss professional hockey player for the Tampa Bay Lightning (NHL).

== T ==
- Ivan Tásler (born 1979), Slovak singer.
- Tina (born 1984), Slovak singer.
- Imre Thököly (1657–1705), Hungarian prince of Transylvania.

== U ==
- Blaho Uhlár (1951-2024), Slovak theatre director

== Z ==
- Zea (born 1991), Slovak television actress, singer and choreographer.
