= Romani people in Slovakia =

Ethnic group

Romani in Slovakia
Romane manusha andi Slovakia (Romani)
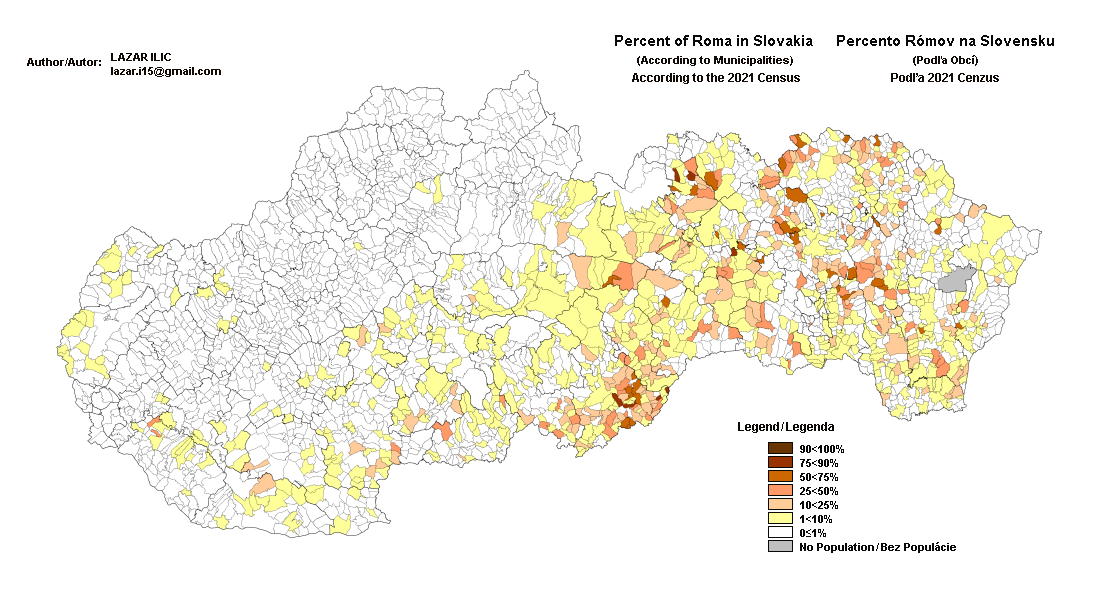

Total population
- 67,179 (2021 census)

Regions with significant populations
- Eastern Slovakia

Languages
- Romani and other languages (Slovak, Hungarian)

Religion
- Roman Catholicism; Greek Catholicism; Pentecostalism; Lutheranism; Restorationism; Eastern Orthodoxy; Romani mythology

According to the last census from 2021, there were 67,179 persons counted as Romani people in Slovakia (Slovak: Rómovia na Slovensku), or 1.23% of the population. However, the number of Roma is usually underreported, with estimates placing the Roma population at 7–11% of the population. Thus the actual number of Roma may be over half a million.

== History ==
=== Origin ===
The Romani people in Slovakia originated in Northern India, from the northwestern Indian regions of Rajasthan, Punjab and southeastern region of Pakistan Sindh.

The linguistic evidence has indisputably shown that roots of Romani language lie in India: the language has grammatical characteristics of Indo-Aryan languages and shares with them a big part of the basic lexicon, for example, body parts or daily routines.

More exactly, Romani shares the basic lexicon with Hindi and Punjabi. It shares many phonetic features with Marwari, while its grammar is closest to Bengali.

Genetic findings in 2012 suggest the Romani originated in northwestern India and migrated as a group. According to a genetic study in 2012, the ancestors of present scheduled tribes and scheduled caste populations of northern India, traditionally referred to collectively as the Ḍoma, are the likely ancestral populations of modern European Roma.

In February 2016, during the International Roma Conference, the Indian Minister of External Affairs stated that the people of the Roma community were children of India. The conference ended with a recommendation to the Government of India to recognize the Roma community spread across 30 countries as a part of the Indian diaspora.

=== Migration to Slovakia ===
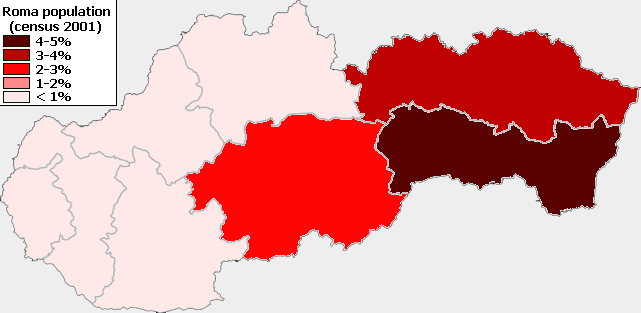
The Roma minority in Slovakia (census 2001)

The first record of sightings of small groups of Romani within the area of present-day Slovakia are from 1322 AD, when the region was part of the Kingdom of Hungary. Major waves of Romani nomads were recorded from 1417 onwards. In 1423 they received a decree from the Hungarian king Sigismund of Luxemburg at Szepes Castle, granting them Europe-wide right of passage and the right to settle. They proved to be useful metal workers for the royal armies fighting the Turks.

Through the ensuing centuries, whilst in western and central Europe Romani were treated violently and often expelled, the Hungarian Kingdom and Habsburg Monarchy in general provided a tolerant and stable safe-haven for the Romani community. In the 18th century, Joseph II of the house of Habsburg attempted to 'civilize' the Romani, for example by prohibiting their dress and customs and educating them. However these efforts generally failed.

=== 20th century ===
After the repressive Romani policies of the first Czechoslovak Republic (1918-1939), the communist government of 1948-1989 attempted to integrate the Romani into the majority population through obligatory education and employment, and the formation of Romani organizations. The nomadic way of life was banned in 1958. Parts of the Romani population were also resettled from Slovakia into the country's Czech regions.

Though these policies were partly successful, after the 1989 Velvet Revolution, the Romani have once again found themselves on the margins of the society. On the one hand, there is a generous social system, but the system fails to effectively integrate them into the mainstream society.

== Culture ==
Rap music holds considerable appeal among the Slovak Roma community and is vital to the Slovak hip-hop scene. The Romani population has embraced hip hop to rise above poverty and articulate their struggles in areas like Lunik IX. Many notable and celebrated rappers in Slovakia, such as Rytmus, come from Roma backgrounds. Romani music enjoys considerable popularity in Slovakia. In spite of the animosity that numerous Slovaks harbor towards their Romani fellow citizens, Romani music is extensively appreciated and is even regarded as "Slovak" when artists like Ciganski Diabli achieve success internationally. Romani bands frequently feature in Slovak wedding celebrations. The Romani community in Slovakia believes in the evil eye, which they refer to as Jakhendar in their folklore. Marikľa is a well-known Romani dish in Slovakia. It is a traditional Roma bread, commonly made by impoverished Romani communities in Slovakia. The bread is made from cheap readily available ingredients.

== Discrimination ==
Roma people suffer serious discrimination in Slovakia. Roma children are segregated in school and do not receive the same level of education as Slovak children. Some are sent to schools for children with mild mental disabilities. As a result, their attainment level is far below average. In Slovakia, dropping out of school early has been prevalently seen among the Roma population, with Roma women taking up a notable portion of those not in education, employment, or training (NEETs). The country has witnessed a concerning upward trend in early school drop-out rates from 4.9% in 2008 to nearly doubling to 8.6% in 2018. A major concern is the insufficient number of trained educators in Slovak kindergartens and primary schools. There is a notable shortage of special education teachers, school psychologists, speech therapists, social pedagogues, and pedagogical assistants. Another problem seen in the school staff would be the lack of training in creating an inclusive school atmosphere in classrooms with Roma children. Teachers often do not receive training in Roma language and culture, resulting in ongoing language barriers between school staff and students or their families. Data from the EU-MIFID II survey highlight a prevalent sense of discrimination among the Roma community in Slovakia, with 54% reporting experiencing discrimination due to their Roma origins in the last five years, and 30% in the past twelve months. The majority of this discrimination is reported in the context of seeking employment, in which applicants with Roma names had a less than 50 percent chance of being accepted for a job interview than non-Roma named applicants even if both parties held similar qualifications like education. Amnesty International's report "Unfulfilled promises: Failing to end segregation of Roma pupils in Slovakia" describes the failure of the Slovak authorities to end the discrimination of Roma children on the grounds of their ethnicity in education. According to a 2012 United Nations Development Programme survey, around 43 per cent of Roma in mainstream schools attended ethnically segregated classes.

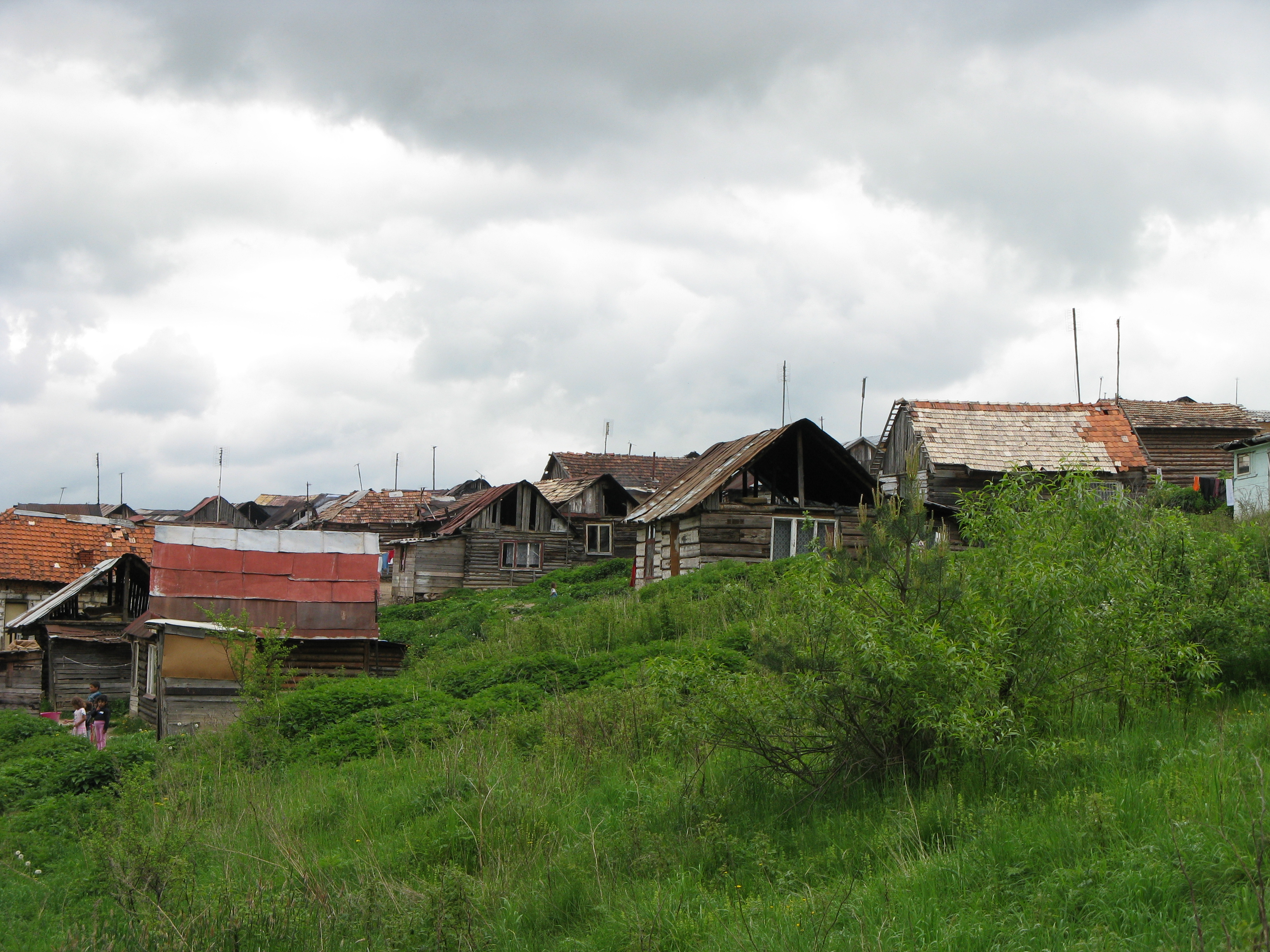
A Romani settlement near Letanovce, Košice Region, Slovakia

In 2014 the European Commission's initiated infringement proceedings against the Slovak government for violating EU anti-discrimination laws in its treatment of Roma children in schools. The Commission's decision to act against Slovakia stems from concerns raised by international and domestic human rights bodies, such as Amnesty International. The Slovak government has been criticized for further exacerbating segregation rather than addressing the causes of the discrimination. One such action taken by the Slovak government in 2010 involved the funding of "container schools" which separate Romani children from other schools by being built directly in Roma settlements.

In 2019 the European Commission issued a reasoned opinion highlighting the country's failure to comply with EU anti-discrimination laws in its treatment of Roma children in education. Despite Slovakia's legislative reforms and adoption of inclusion strategies and action plans, the Commission found these efforts insufficient after careful assessment and monitoring. The discrimination against Roma children persists, with a significant percentage attending schools with predominantly Roma students. Slovakia still has the highest rate of Roma segregation in education among EU member states.

== Forced sterilisation ==
A human rights fact finding mission found widespread violations of Romani women's human rights including forced sterilisations, racially discriminatory access to health care and physical and verbal abuse by medical staff amongst others. In their report on the topic, The Center for Reproductive Rights has outlined a series of actions that they believe the Slovak government should take to address issues related to forced sterilization. They propose the establishment of a government body dedicated to investigating individual complaints, which would involve reviewing medical records and conducting examinations in cases where women suspect they were sterilized without their knowledge. Additionally, they suggest gathering statistics to understand the prevalence of sterilization in the Romani population. The Center also recommends providing monetary damages to women who were coercively or forcibly sterilized. Furthermore, the Center calls for the enactment of anti-discrimination legislation that aligns with the principles established in the EU Race Directive. They suggest creating a body to analyze discrimination issues, study possible solutions, and provide concrete assistance to victims. Additionally, they advocate for allocating more budgetary resources to address discrimination against the Roma community in general.

The accusations of forced sterilization have been claimed to be false, eg. in a paper published by a non-governmental organization stating that it was "aimed at proving an earlier assumed hypothesis, highly popular in the media. It did not bring any specific knowledge, no hard data, thanks to which we could say that some truth was revealed. This is, to put it shortly, an example of a harmful action on the part of NGOs." However, many cases have been confirmed, for instance by the European Court of Human Rights. In 2021 the Slovak government apologised for forced sterilisations of thousands of Roma women. Also in 2021, the Czech Republic passed a compensation bill.

== Crime ==
Roma are the victims of ethnically driven violence and crime in Slovakia. According to monitoring and reports provided by the European Roma Rights Center (ERRC) in 2013, racist violence, evictions, threats, and more subtle forms of discrimination have increased over the past two years in Slovakia. The ERRC considers the situation in Slovakia to be one of the worst in Europe, as of 2013.

== Public opinion ==
The 2009 Pew Research poll found that 78% of Slovaks held unfavorable views of the Romani people. This is compared to the 2019 Pew Research poll which found that 76% of Slovaks held unfavorable views of the Romani people.

== Notable Romani people living or born in the area of present-day Slovakia ==
- Kristián Bari, footballer (2001–)
- Eugen Bari, footballer (1971–)
- Vierka Berkyová, singer (1991–)
- Irena Bihariová, human rights activist and politician (1980–)
- Panna Cinka, violinist (1711?–1772)
- Rytmus, rapper (1977–)
- Dominika Mirgová, singer (1991–)
- Šorty, moderator, musical performer (1988–)
- Adam Cibuľa, bodybuilder (1964–)
- Anita Soul, singer (1985–)
- Peter Pollák, politician (1973–)

== See also ==
- Romani people in Czechoslovakia
- Demographics of Slovakia
- Luník IX
- Romani people in Romania
