= Zdenka Predná discography =

This is the discography of Slovak singer Zdenka Predná.

== Albums ==
=== Studio albums ===
| Year | Album | Peak chart positions | |
| Year | Album | SK | CZ |
|---|---|---|---|
| 2005 | Sunny Day: Studio album; Release date: 28 November 2005; Format: CD; Label: Sony BMG | — | — |
| 2007 | Zdenka Predná: Studio album; Release date: 26 March 2007; Format: CD; Label: Sony BMG | 5 | — |
| 2009 | Srdce z bubliny: Studio album; Release date: 5 October 2009; Format: CD; Label: Sony Music Entertainment | — | — |

== Single ==
=== Solo ===
| Year | Title | Peak chart positions | | | Album |
| Year | Title | SK Top 100 | SK Top 50 Domáce | CZ Top 100 | Album |
|---|---|---|---|---|---|
| 2005 | „Len ty smieš“ | 1 | 1 | — | Sunny Day |
| 2006 | „Vietor“ (feat. Tina) | 79 | 19 | — | Sunny Day |
| 2006 | „Vody sú pomalé“ | 44 | 13 | — | Sunny Day |
| 2007 | „Keď to nejde“ | 1 | 1 | — | Zdenka Predná |
| 2007 | „Ponad maky“ | 20 | 7 | — | Zdenka Predná |
| 2008 | „Kam má ísť?“ | 11 | 5 | — | Zdenka Predná |
| 2009 | „Srdce z bubliny“ | 3 | 1 | — | Srdce z bubliny |
| 2009 | „Odkiaľ viem“ | 41 | 8 | — | Srdce z bubliny |
| 2010 | „Na povrázku“ | 62 | 9 | — | Srdce z bubliny |
| 2010 | „Krásne dni“ | 24 | 3 | — | Srdce z bubliny |

=== Guest singles ===
| Year | Title | Peak chart positions | | | Album |
| Year | Title | SK Top 100 | SK Top 50 Domáce | CZ Top 100 | Album |
|---|---|---|---|---|---|
| 2006 | „Summer Fun“ (Funrádio & Zdenka Predná & Tina) | 58 | 29 | — | |
| | „The Passenger“ (Music One Band & Tomáš Sloboda & Lasky & Zdenka Predná & Bet Maj Sepja & Viktor Hazard) | — | — | — | |
| 2008 | „My“ (DNA feat. Zdenka Predná) | 67 | 15 | — | LOVE (peňáze/láska) |
| 2009 | „Ja viem“ (Haf feat. Zdenka Predná) | — | — | — | Moderný spevák |
| 2009 | „You“ (Robert Burian feat. Zdenka Predná) | 19 | 7 | — | Sound Park |
| 2010 | „Party“ (Street Dance Academy feat. Zdenka Predná & Robert Burian) | — | — | — | |

== Music videos ==
| Year | Title | Director | Watch | Album |
|---|---|---|---|---|
| 2006 | „Vietor“ (feat. Tina) | Braňo Vincze | YouTube | Sunny Day |
| 2007 | „Keď to nejde“ | Zdenka Predná | YouTube | Zdenka Predná |
| 2008 | „Kam má ísť?“ | Braňo Vincze | YouTube | Zdenka Predná |
| 2009 | „Ja viem“ (Tomáš Hafner feat. Zdenka Predná) | Peter Ehrenberger | YouTube | Moderný spevák |
| 2010 | „Na povrázku“ | Veronika Obertová | YouTube | Srdce z bubliny |
| 2010 | „Krásne dni“ | Branko Jašš | | Srdce z bubliny |
| 2010 | „Party" (Street Dance Academy feat. Zdenka Predná & Robert Burian) | Imagine Vision | YouTube | |
