= Martina Schindlerová =

Slovak singer

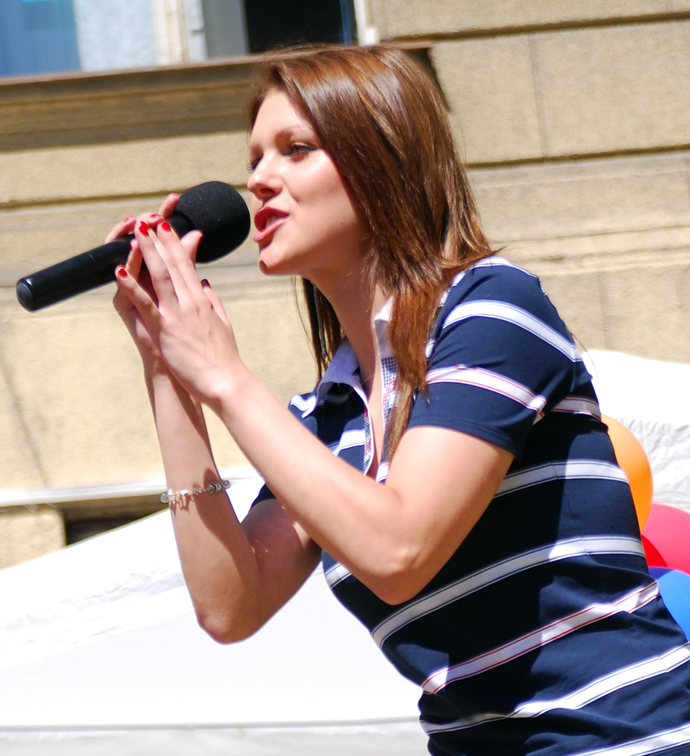
- Šindlerová in 2011
- Born: 29 June 1988 (age 38); Bratislava, Slovakia
- Other name: Martina Šindlerová
- Occupation: singer
- Known for: Runner up in the first serie of Slovensko hľadá SuperStar
- Spouse: Kamil Haršány (m. 2012; div. 2018)
- Children: 2

Martina Šindlerová (born 29 June 1988), also known as Martina Schindlerova, is a Slovak singer. She participated in Slovensko hľadá SuperStar, the Slovak version of Pop Idol, shown by STV.

== Biography ==
Martina Šindlerová was born on 29 June 1988 in Bratislava. She started singing at the age of six but only gained wider recognition after finishing second in the first series of the Slovensko hľadá SuperStar show in 2005. Just a few months after the show ended, Šindlerová released her first album Patríme Spolu, recorded in Belgium. While the album was received poorly by the critics, it became the best selling album of the year and received a platinum record for selling over 20,000 CDs.

After graduating from high school, Šindlerová enrolled in law school at the Comenius University while continuing to pursue her musical career. In 2008, she released her second album Čo sa to tu deje and in 2010 she unsuccessfully competed for national nomination for the Eurovision Song Contest. Nonetheless, after starting a family, she gradually sidelined music and focused on raising a family. In 2021, she unsuccessfully attempted to restart her singing career and enrolled in a PhD program at the Comenius university, which she later abandoned.

== Personal life ==
Right after Slovensko hľadá SuperStar, Šindlerová started a relationship with TV executive and politician Branislav Záhradník. The relationship was controversial because Šindlerová was 16 years old at the time, while Záhradník was 31. They split after four years. In 2012, she married the businessman Kamil Haršány. They had two children – daughter Martina and son Kamil. In 2018 Haršány was arrested due to suspicions of mafia involvement and soon after Šindlerová applied for divorce, citing years of physical and mental abuse. In 2022, Šindlerová started a relationship with the lawyer Marcel Boris. They split their time between Bratislava and Dominican Republic.

== Slovensko hľadá SuperStar Performances ==
Episode	Theme	Song choice	Original artist	Result
Semi-final - Group 5	Personal Choice	"Stop!"	Sam Brown	Advanced
Top 11	My Idol	"Stairway To Heaven"	Led Zeppelin	Safe
Top 10	Ballads	"Je t'aime"	Lara Fabian	Safe
Top 9	1970s Disco	"Hot Stuff"	Donna Summer	Safe
Top 8	Hits of Year 2004	"Left Outside Alone"	Anastacia	Safe
Top 7	Rock Edition	"Weak"	Skunk Anansie	Safe
Top 6	Duets	"Stumblin' In" with Tomáš Bezdeda	Suzi Quatro and Chris Norman	Safe
Top 6	Duets	"Pár dní" with Robo Mikla	Desmod and Zuzana Smatanová	Safe
Top 6	Duets	"The Shoop Shoop Song" with Katarína Koščová	Cher	Safe
Top 5	The Beatles vs Elvis Presley	"Oh! Darling"	The Beatles	Safe
Top 5	The Beatles vs Elvis Presley	"My Way"	Elvis Presley	Safe
Top 4	Slovak Hits	"Chlap z kríža"	Szidi Tobias	Bottom 2
Top 4	Slovak Hits	"Vyznanie"	Marika Gombitová	Bottom 2
Top 3	Swing	"Over the Rainbow"	Judy Garland	Safe
Top 3	Swing	"It's Only a Paper Moon"	Ella Fitzgerald	Safe
Top 3	Swing	"I Got Rhythm"	Judy Garland	Safe
Finale	Favorite song	"Left Outside Alone"	Anastacia	Runner-up
Finale	Favorite song	"Je t'aime"	Lara Fabian	Runner-up
Finale	Winner's song	"Najkrajšia SMS-ka"	Martina Šindlerová	Runner-up
Finale	Finalist duet	"Zasvieť" with Katarína Koščová	TOP 2	Runner-up

== Discography ==
=== Albums ===
- Slovensko hľadá Superstar Top 11 (April 2005)
- Patríme K Sebe (October 2005)
- Čo sa to tu deje (May 2008)

Patríme K Sebe (Album)

- Released: October 2005
- Format: CD
- Label: Sony BMG
- Chart position: No. 1 in Slovakia
- Certification: Double Platinum
- Tracks: eighteen

=== Singles ===
- "Je T'aime"
- "Neutekám"
- "Birds of Paradise"
- "Len sám Boh vie"

== See also ==
- The 100 Greatest Slovak Albums of All Time
