= Samuel Tomeček =

Slovak singer (born 1986)

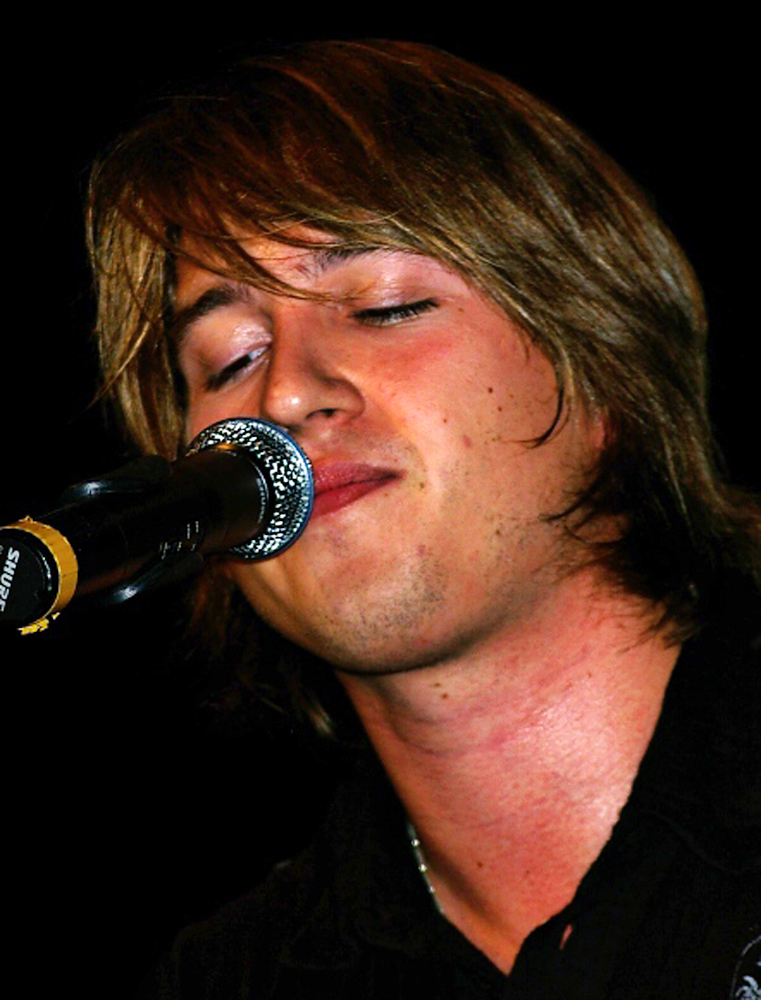
- Samuel Tomeček performing in Malacky in November 2009
- Born: 22 May 1986 (age 40); Bratislava, Czechoslovakia
- Other name: Samo Tomeček
- Occupation: Singer
- Years active: 2004–present
- Spouse: Sophie Tomečková
- Musical career
- Genres: Rock; Pop music
- Instrument: Vocals
- Labels: Sony BMG; Závodský Records; Fair Play Music Records
- Website: samueltomecek.com

Samuel Tomeček (born 22 May 1986 in Bratislava), also known as Samo Tomeček, is a Slovak singer. He rose to popularity after competing in the finals of the first session SuperStar Search Slovakia in 2004 at the age of 19. After the show, Tomeček together with his band Free Inna Cage released their first album Young and Rude (Mladý a Drzý), produced by Ivan Tásler under the Sony BMG label. The album received a Gold Record. Tomeček followed up on his first album by three more albums: Like in Nirvana (Ako v nirváne) (2009), I don't sleep (Nespím) (2015) and ICONS (IKONY) (2017).

Since 2011 he has been a regular part of the popular TV show We love Slovakia (Milujeme Slovensko).

In 2016, he produced a song My Place (Moje miesto), which became a campaign theme for the Slovak National Party.

== Personal life ==
In 2020 he married his long term girlfriend Sophie. The wedding was delayed three times due to COVID-19 pandemic.
