= Katarína Koščová =

Slovak singer (born 1982)

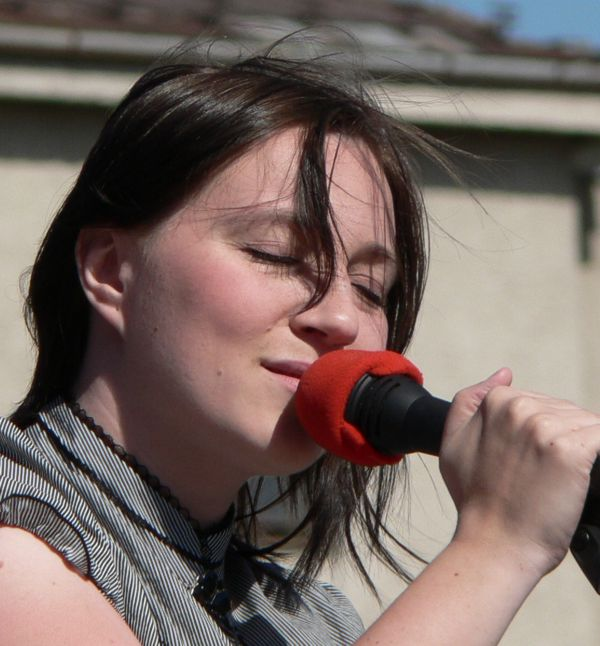
- Katarína Koščová
- Born: February 11, 1982 (age 44); Prešov, Slovakia
- Occupation: singer
- Children: 1

Katarína Koščová (born 11 February 1982 in Prešov, Slovakia) is a Slovak singer who rose to popularity after winning Slovensko Hľadá SuperStar, the Slovak version of Pop Idol, shown by STV.

== Slovensko hľadá SuperStar Performances ==
Episode	Theme	Song choice	Original artist	Result
Semi-final - Group 3	Personal Choice	"Rome Wasn't Built in a Day"	Morcheeba	Advanced
Top 11	My Idol	"You Had Me"	Joss Stone	Safe
Top 10	Ballads	"Little Sister"	Jana Kirschner	Safe
Top 9	1970s Disco	"We Are Family"	Sister Sledge	Safe
Top 8	Hits of Year 2004	"Powerless (Say What You Want)"	Nelly Furtado	Safe
Top 7	Rock Edition	"You Oughta Know"	Alanis Morissette	Safe
Top 6	Duets	"Say Say Say" with Zdenka Predná	Michael Jackson and George Michael	Bottom 3
Top 6	Duets	"Oh Me Oh My" with Miro Jaroš	Jana Kirschner and Miroslav Žbirka	Bottom 3
Top 6	Duets	"The Shoop Shoop Song" with Martina Šindlerová	Cher	Bottom 3
Top 5	The Beatles vs Elvis Presley	"I Saw Her Standing There"	The Beatles	Safe
Top 5	The Beatles vs Elvis Presley	"Jailhouse Rock"	Elvis Presley	Safe
Top 4	Slovak Hits	"Tam kde sa neumiera"	Zuzana Smatanová	Safe
Top 4	Slovak Hits	"Pomätená"	Marika Gombitová	Safe
Top 3	Swing	"Sing, Sing, Sing (With a Swing)"	Louis Prima	Safe
Top 3	Swing	"Summertime"	Abbie Mitchell	Safe
Top 3	Swing	"Cheek to Cheek"	Ginger Rogers	Safe
Finale	Favorite song	"Rome Wasn't Built in a Day"	Morcheeba	Winner
Finale	Favorite song	"You Oughta Know"	Alanis Morissette	Winner
Finale	Winner's song	"Najkrajšia SMS-ka"	Katarína Koščová	Winner
Finale	Finalist duet	"Zasvieť" with Martina Šindlerová	TOP 2	Winner

== Discography ==
Albums

- Slovensko hľadá Superstar Top 11 (April 2005)
- Ešte sa nepoznáme (July 2005)
- Naboso (October 2006)
- Nebotrasenie (February 2009)
- Štedrý večer (October 2012)
- Oknom (September 2014)

Singles

- Katka
- Pehatá
- Koľko ešte krát
- Posledná

== See also ==
- The 100 Greatest Slovak Albums of All Time
