= Petra Humeňanská =

Slovak singer and actress (born 1984)

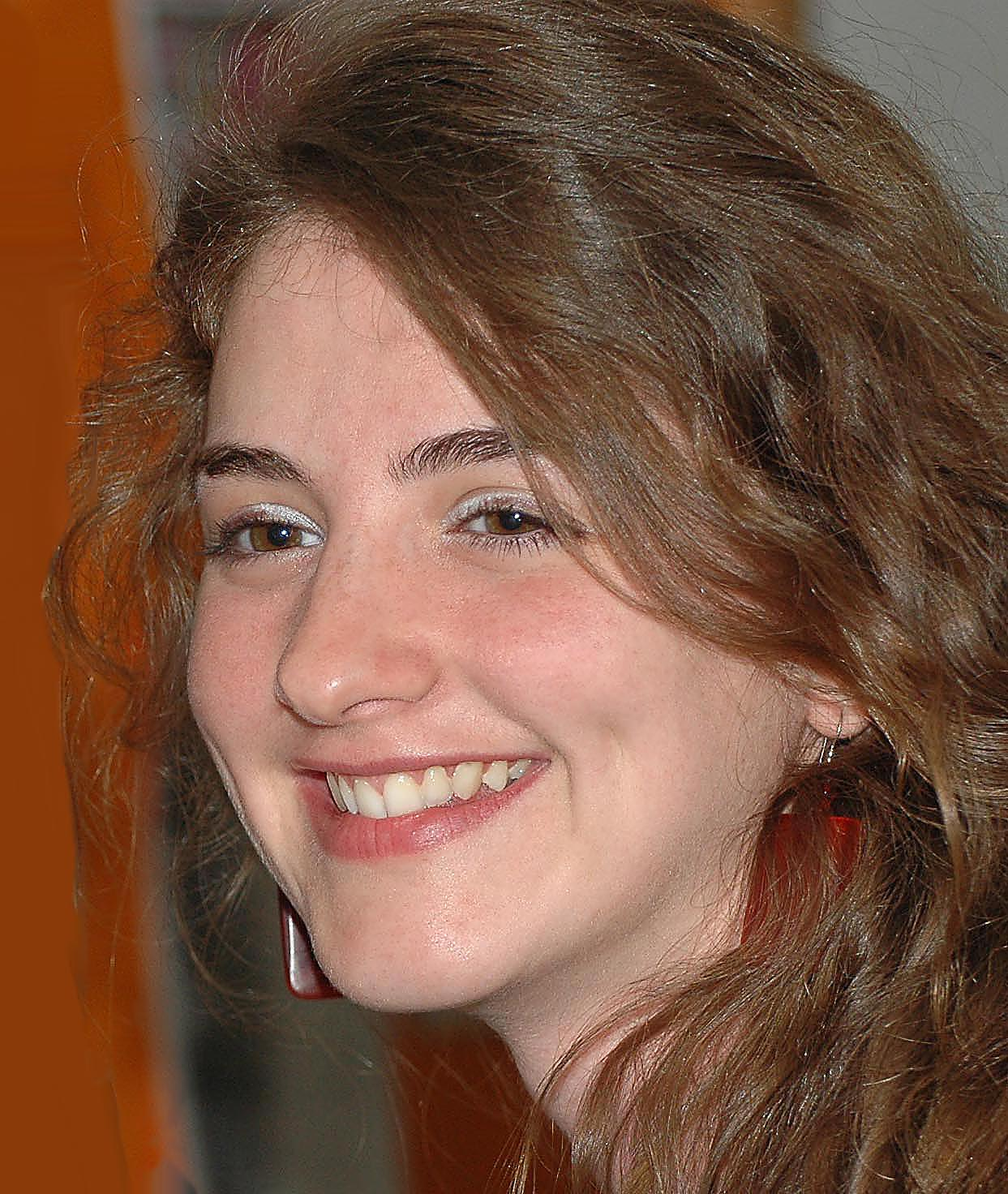
- Born: 29 August 1984 (age 41); Prešov, Czechoslovakia
- Occupation: singer

Petra Humeňanská (born 29 August 1984) is a Slovak singer and actress.

Humeňanská was born in Prešov. She dreamed of being a singer from an early age inspired by the example of her father and brother who are also musicians. After graduating from a high school in Košice, she studied musical acting at the Academy of Performing Arts in Bratislava.

Humeňanská became widely known in 2005 for competing in the finals of the first session of the SuperStar Search Slovakia show, where she was eliminated in the second round. Since 2006, she has been performing with the band Dollys, which also included her sister Jana. In 2010 she was Slovakia's nominee for the Eurovision contest with her song Rosa Rosí, but failed to advance to the finals. In 2013, she also started to perform with the band Družina, combining jazz and traditional Slovak folk music. The band's 2016 album Vianočné received a platinum record.

In addition to music, Humeňanská is also active as an actress. She has appeared in a number of plays of the Slovak National Theatre, most prominent of which being the role of Bianca in The Taming of the Shrew.

In 2017, Humeňanská married a yogi Marián Madhuka Sedlák.
