= Vierka Berkyová =

Slovak singer

- Born: 23 February 1991 (age 35)
- Origin: Lučenec, Czechoslovakia
- Occupation: Singer
- Years active: 2007–present

Vierka Berkyová (born 23 February 1991) is a Slovak singer who participated in the third season of SuperStar Search Slovakia in 2007, which she won.

Berkyová is from a Romani family.

She and her family lived with the singer Ida Kellarová while working on the musical adaptation of Gypsies go to Heaven, which was depicted in the documentary Vierka, or The Mystery of Family Disappearance, filmed by Miroslav Janek. Berkyová released her first English single "This Love" in 2015 but the album she was to release was cancelled by Sony Music.

She subsequently abandoned popular music to dedicate herself to gospel music and religion.

== Slovensko hľadá SuperStar performances ==
Episode	Theme	Song choice	Original artist	Result
Semi-final – Top 11 women	Personal Choice	"What a Feeling"	Irene Cara	Safe
Semi-final – Top 9 women	Personal Choice	"I'll Be There"	Mariah Carey	Safe
Semi-final – Top 7 women	Personal Choice	"If I Ain't Got You"	Alicia Keys	Safe
Top 10	Year they Were Born	"Emotions"	Mariah Carey	Safe
Top 9	Rock	"Don't Speak"	No Doubt	Safe
Top 8	Balads	"Anjelik môj"	Dara Rolins	Safe
Top 7	Dance	"Dancing Queen"	ABBA	Safe
Top 6	Big Bands and Duets	"Lásko má já stůňu"	Helena Vondráčková	Safe
Top 6	Big Bands and Duets	"I'll Stand by You" with Ivana Kováčová	Girls Aloud	Safe
Top 5	Miroslav Žbirka	"Atlantída"	Miroslav Žbirka	Bottom 2
Top 5	Miroslav Žbirka	"Dvaja"	Miroslav Žbirka	Bottom 2
Top 4	Unplugged	"Out of Reach"	Gabrielle	Safe
Top 4	Unplugged	"Killing Me Softly"	Fugees	Safe
Top 3	Idol's Choice	"From Sarah with Love"	Sarah Connor	Safe
Top 3	Idol's Choice	"Ain't That Just A Way"	Lutricia McNeal	Safe
Top 3	Idol's Choice	"Viem že povieš áno"	Tina	Safe
Finale	Favorite song	"Killing Me Softly"	Fugees	Winner
Finale	Christmas song	"Tři oříšky"	Iveta Bartošová	Winner
Finale	Winner's song	"Angels"	Jessica Simpson	Winner
Finale	Finalist duet	"Dotkni sa hviezd" with Dominika Mirgová	TOP 10	Winner

== Singles ==
- 2015: "This Love"
- 2015: "Through the Fire"
