= Dominika Mirgová =

Slovak singer and actress

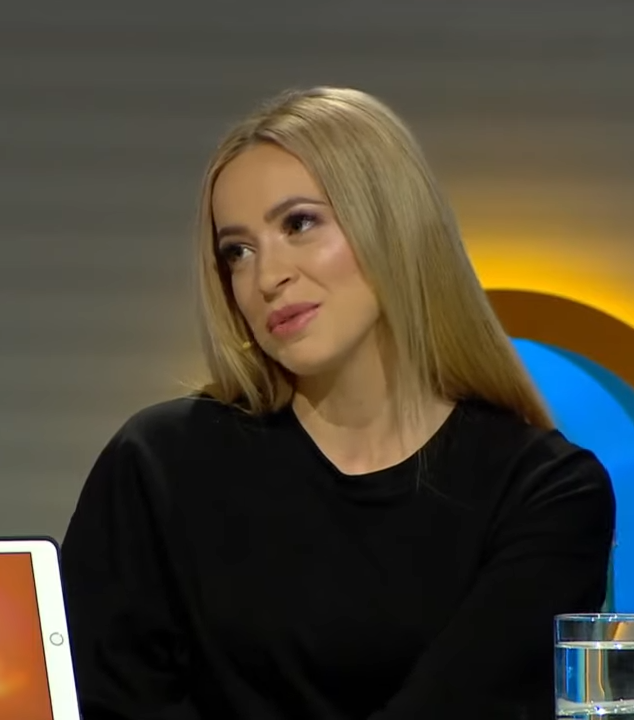
- Mirgová in 2020

Background information
- Born: 23 December 1991 (age 34)
- Origin: Trnava, Czechoslovakia
- Occupation: Singer
- Years active: 2007–present
- Website: www.dominikamirgova.sk

Dominika Mirgová (born 23 December 1991) is a Slovak singer and actress. Mirgová has been singing since she was three years old, and has been active in music alongside her father. She is half Romani.

== Career ==
=== Beginnings ===
Mirgová began her career at the age of 15 in the third season of Slovensko hľadá SuperStar (based on the British TV show Pop Idol), finishing second place. One year later, she debuted with her titular solo album.

In October 2013, together with the rapper Suveren, Mirgová recorded the benefit song "Musím Mej Nádej" for the Kvapka Nádej Foundation. A video clip was also created for the song, but neither of them appeared in the video clip. One month later, she collaborated with Miro Jaroš with the song "Bugs" in the Slovak dub of French animated film Bugs: The Valley of the Lost Ants.

=== 2015–2017: Armáda and departure from the Galgan Music ===
After the success of her Nová album, Mirgová started preparations for her third studio album, Armáda, with the leading single "Vám", in which she presents herself as the author of the lyrics for the first time. Mirgová stated: "I wouldn't be here without the inspiration from fans, so I wrote and dedicated the song to them, because it's only thanks to them that what I do has meaning." Apart from thanking her fans in the song, she also leaves a rapped message for the haters. Another single for the forthcoming album, "Hore", had more than 430,000 views in the first eight days of its release on YouTube. However, the flip side of the high number of views was the unflattering ratio of positive and negative reactions to the controversial single.

In December 2014, Mirgová released the Christmas song "Šťastné a veselé" (lit. "Happy and Merry"). The video clip has the form of a simple studio video in which she is accompanied by musicians Marek Danko on the piano and Peter Fajta on the violin.

After a long hiatus from pregnancy, she resumed her musician career in October 2015 with the song "Závislí" (lit. "Dependent"), collaborating with DJ Róbert Burian.

== Personal life ==
In November 2014, at the end of the Night of Hope charity gala, Mirgová stroked her growing belly several times. Her pregnancy was announced by presenter Jarmila Lajčáková-Hargašová. The news was subsequently confirmed by the singer herself on her profile on the social network Facebook.

In April 2015, Mirgová gave birth to a son named Peter. The same year in August, she married Peter Zvolenský. In 2023 Mirgová divorced Peter Zvolenský it is rumored that this was due to was infidelity on Zvolenskýs part, but these rumors are currently unconfirmed.

== Discography ==
=== Albums ===
- 2008: Dominika Mirgová
- 2012: Nová
- 2016: Armáda
- 2019: Toto som ja
- 2020: Noačo?!
- 2023: Wonder Woman

=== Singles ===
- 2010: "Cesta snov"
- 2013: "Je Koniec" (ft. Kali)
- 2013: "L.A.S.K.A." (ft. Rakby)
- 2013: "Swing" (ft. Mafia Corner)

== Slovensko hľadá SuperStar performances ==
Episode	Theme	Song choice	Original artist	Result
Semi-final – Top 11 women's	Personal Choice	"Rome Wasn't Built in a Day"	Morcheeba	Safe
Semi-final – Top 9 women's	Personal Choice	"Say It Right"	Nelly Furtado	Safe
Semi-final – Top 7 women's	Personal Choice	"Big Girls Don't Cry"	Fergie	Safe
Top 10	Year they Were Born	"Save the Best for Last"	Vanessa L. Williams	Safe
Top 9	Rock	"Complicated"	Avril Lavigne	Safe
Top 8	Ballads	"Stickwitu"	Pussycat Dolls	Safe
Top 7	Dance	"Čo o mne vieš"	Dara Rolins	Safe
Top 6	Big Bands and Duets	"Unwritten"	Natasha Bedingfield	Safe
Top 6	Big Bands and Duets	"One" with Martin Konrád	U2 and Mary J.Blige	Safe
Top 5	Miroslav Žbirka	"Zažni"	Miroslav Žbirka	Bottom 3
Top 5	Miroslav Žbirka	"Nespáľme to krásne v nás"	Miroslav Žbirka	Bottom 3
Top 4	Unplugged	"Umbrella"	Rihanna	Bottom 2
Top 4	Unplugged	"Vietor"	Zdenka Predná	Bottom 2
Top 3	Idol's Choice	"Knockin' on Heaven's Door"	Avril Lavigne	Safe
Top 3	Idol's Choice	"Sway"	Pussycat Dolls	Safe
Top 3	Idol's Choice	"Irreplaceable"	Beyoncé Knowles	Safe
Finale	Favorite song	"Sway"	Pussycat Dolls	Runner-up
Finale	Christmas song	"All I Want for Christmas Is You"	Mariah Carey	Runner-up
Finale	Winner's song	"Angels"	Jessica Simpson	Runner-up
Finale	Finalist duet	"Dotkni sa hviezd" with Vierka Berkyová	Top 10	Runner-up
