= Jana Hubinská =

Slovak film and stage actress (born 1964)

- Born: 7 June 1964 (age 60); Bratislava, Czechoslovakia
- Occupation: Actress
- Years active: 1986-present
- Website: hubinska.sk

Jana Hubinská (born 7 June 1964) is a Slovak film and stage actress. She won a Czech Lion for Best Supporting Actress at the 2002 Czech Lion Awards, for her role in the film Girlie. She has performed in theatres such as Divadlo West in Bratislava and the Theatre on the Balustrade in Prague.

== Selected filmography ==
- Girlie (2002)
- Pupendo (2003)
- Wrong Side Up (2005)
- Revival (2013)
