= Casting television =

Type of competition television program

Casting television is a competition television program where the winner wins a recording contract, or takes part in a competition.

== Slovakia ==
Slovakia's competition is Superstars, and the prize is a car, cash and recording contracts. Stars such as Zdenka Predna came to prominence this way.

== United Kingdom ==
Simon Cowell's "Popstars" is perhaps the most famous one of the lot, and other shows on a similar focus are Stars in Their Eyes, and Andrew Lloyd Webber's How Do You Solve a Problem Like Maria?.

== United States ==
Following directly on the UK template is the American Idol competition.

== Republic of Ireland ==
Ireland's version, called You're a Star, had a unique twist: winners came into the Eurovision Song Contest as the prize. However, after the disaster of the McCall Twins that format has been abandoned. The most famous winner and most successful in Eurovision (though he did not win) was Mickey Joe Harte.
