= Zuzana Smatanová =

Slovak musician (born 1984)

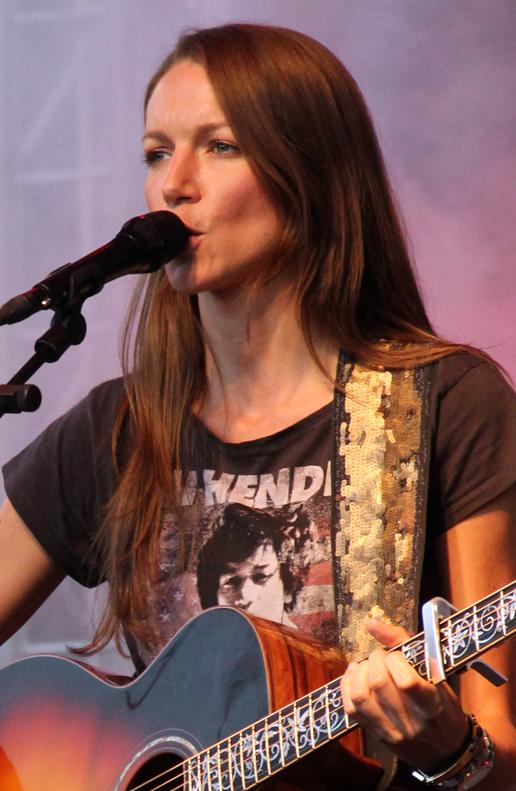
- Smatanová in 2014

Background information
- Born: Zuzana Smatanová; 14 June 1984 (age 42); Súľov-Hradná, Czechoslovakia
- Genres: pop-rock, pop music
- Occupations: Musician, songwriter, composer
- Instruments: Vocals, piano, flute, guitar
- Years active: 2003–present
- Label: Sony BMG
- Website: zuzanasmatanova.sk

Zuzana Smatanová (born 14 June 1984 Súľov-Hradná) is a Slovak pop-rock singer. She sings in Slovak and in English, writing her own lyrics and music. She plays the piano, the flute and the guitar.

In 1998 she was accepted to Pedagogical and Social Academy in Turčianske Teplice, but was more attracted to writing music than to being a teacher.

== Awards in slovak competitions ==
She won the Slovak Coca-Cola Popstar (2003) competition, the "Discovery of the Year" category at Aurel Awards 2003, Female singer of the year on "OTO" in 2004 and 2005 and Best female singer on "Slavik" in 2005, 2006, 2007, 2008, 2009 and 2010.

== Discography ==
- Entirely good (8 September 2003)
- Svet mi stúpil na nohu (10 October 2005)
- Tabletky odvahy (24 September 2007)
- Live! (CD and DVD, 2008)
- Gemini (2CD, 2009)
- Dvere (2011)
- Momenty (2013)
- Echo (2018)

She also collaborated with Desmod (song "Pár dní" from Skupinová terapia album, and song "Čiernobiela" from Kyvadlo album) and IMT Smile (songs "Suzanna" and "Úsmev a čaj (I Am Tea-Smile)" from Exotica album).

== See also ==
- The 100 Greatest Slovak Albums of All Time
