= Zdenka Predná =

Slovak female singer (born 1984)

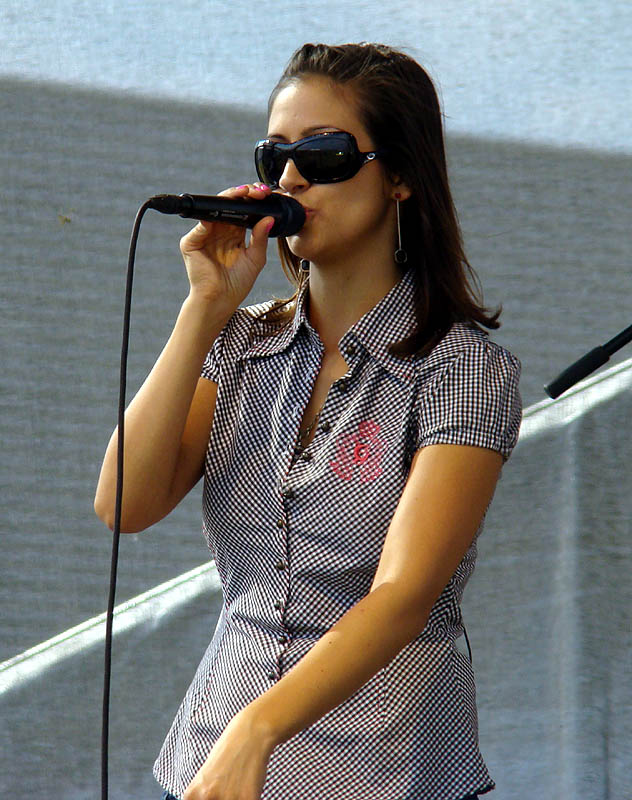

Background information
- Born: Zdenka Predná; 31 March 1984 (age 42); Banská Štiavnica, Czechoslovakia
- Genres: funk, pop music, electronic
- Occupations: Musician, songwriter, composer, producer
- Instrument: Vocals
- Years active: 2004–present
- Label: Sony BMG
- Website: www.zdenkapredna.sk

Zdenka Predná (31 March 1984) is a Slovak female singer. She is one of the most successful finalists of the Slovak version of the Pop Idol, called Slovensko hľadá Superstar for season 2004–2005. Zdenka Predná has recorded two studio albums.

Zdenka's vocals also featured on the popular trance track, You, by Robert Burian, which was released in 2010.

== Discography ==
- 2005 - Sunny Day
- 2007 - Zdenka Predná
- 2009 - Srdce z bubliny

== See also ==
- The 100 Greatest Slovak Albums of All Time
