= Polnočné otázky: 16 Naj 1984–1993 =

Compilation album by Marika Gombitová
- Released: 1993
- Recorded: 1984–93
- Genre: Pop rock
- Length: 68:06
- Label: OPUS (#91 2410)
- Producer: Ján Lauko; Peter Breiner; Peter Smolinský

Marika Gombitová chronology
Kam idú ľudia? (1990)	Polnočné otázky: 16 Naj 1984–1993 (1993)	Zostaň (1994)

Polnočné otázky: 16 Naj 1984–1993 (The Midnight Questions: Top 16 1984–1993), also known as Top 16, is the second compilation album by Marika Gombitová, released on OPUS in 1993. The set featured a new track, "Novembrové chryzantémy".

== Track listing ==
All tracks are written by Gombitová and Peteraj, unless stated otherwise

No.	Title	Writer(s)	Length
1.	"Crazy" (taken from №5)		4:02
2.	"Zem menom láska" (taken from №5)		3:20
3.	"Voľné miesto v srdci" (taken from Voľné miesto v srdci)		4:42
4.	"Mami, mami" (taken from SP "Nenápadná")		3:50
5.	"Záverečná" (taken from Voľné miesto v srdci)		4:22
6.	"V období dažďa" (taken from Ateliér duše)		3:19
7.	"Ateliér duše" (taken from Ateliér duše)	Patejdl; Peteraj	3:51
8.	"Koloseum" (taken from Ateliér duše)		4:20
9.	"Tak si so mnou opakuj" (taken from Ateliér duše)	Patejdl; Peteraj	4:22
10.	"Ave Mária" (taken from SP "Tváre pred zrkadlom")	Dušík; Peteraj	4:56
11.	"Polnočné otázky" (taken from Kam idú ľudia?)		4:58
12.	"Babylónia" (taken from Kam idú ľudia?)		5:15
13.	"Ži a nechaj žiť" (taken from Ateliér duše)		3:13
14.	"Novembrové chryzantémy" (new track)		3:20
15.	"Úlomky spomienok tribute to Chinese poetry" (taken from Kam idú ľudia?)		5:23
16.	"Kríž" (taken from Kam idú ľudia?)	Šeban; Peteraj	4:53
Total length:			68:06

== Official releases ==
- 1993: Polnočné otázky: 16 Naj 1984–1993, LP, MC, OPUS, #91 2410
- 1993: Top 16: Diskotéka Ženského magazínu, re-release, CD, Ženský magazín

== Credits and personnel ==
- Marika Gombitová - lead vocal, writer
- Václav Patejdl - music
- Gabo Dušík - writer
- Andrej Šeban - writer
- Kamil Peteraj - lyrics, notes
- Peter Breiner - producer
- Ján Lauko - producer
- Peter Smolinský - producer
- Juraj Filo - sound director
- Ivan Jombík - sound director
- Jozef Krajčovič - sound director
- Ivan Minárik - sound director
- Alexander Soldán - mastering
- Tibor Borský - photography
