= Česko Slovenská SuperStar season 3 =

Česko Slovenská SuperStar
- Season 3
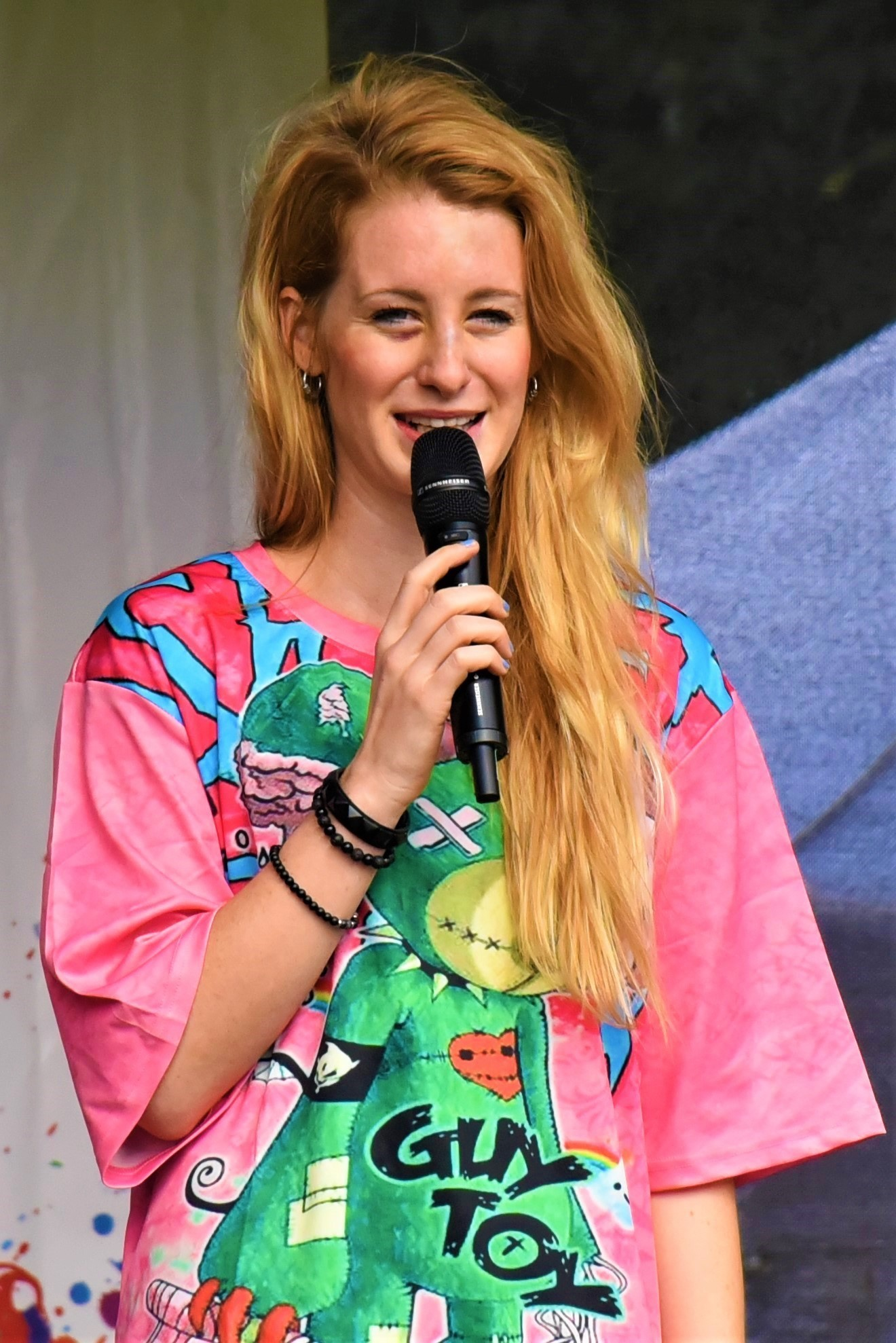
- Hosted by: Roman Juraško; Zora Kepková
- Judges: Ondřej Soukup; Ewa Farna; Pavol Habera
- Winner: Sabina Křováková
- Runner-up: Štefan Pčelár
- Finals venue: Barrandov Studios

Release
- Original network: Nova; Markíza
- Original release: February 10 – June 2, 2013

Season chronology
- ← Previous; Season 2 Next → Season 4

Česko Slovenská SuperStar (English: Czech&Slovak SuperStar) is the joint Czech-Slovak version of Idol series' Pop Idol merged from Česko hledá SuperStar and Slovensko hľadá SuperStar which previous to that had three individual seasons each. The third season premiered in February 2013 with castings held in Prague, Brno, Ostrava, Banská Bystrica, Bratislava and Košice. It is broadcast on two channels: «TV Nova» (Czech Republic) and «Markíza» (Slovakia) which have also been the broadcast stations for the individual seasons. Also both hosts have been their hosts countries before as have been three out of the three judges. To legitimate a fair chance for each country's contestants to reach the final, twelve of the contestants will compete split into genders and nationalities in the semifinals, guaranteeing a in the top 12.

== Regional auditions ==
Auditions were held in Bratislava, Košice, Prague, Ostrava, Banská Bystrica and Brno in the autumn and winter of 2012.

Audition City	Date
Košice, Slovakia	November 10, 2012
Banská Bystrica, Slovakia	November 11, 2012
Ostrava, Czech Republic	November 17, 2012
Brno, Czech Republic	November 18, 2012
Bratislava, Slovakia	December 1, 2012
Prague, Czech Republic	December 15–16, 2012

== Divadlo ==
In Divadlo where 100 contestants. The contestants first emerged on stage in groups of 9 or 10 but performed solo unaccompanied, and those who did not impress the judges were cut after the group finished their individual performances. 28 made it to the next round Dlouhá cesta. 16 contestants made it to the Semi-final.

== Semi-final ==
16 semifinalists were revealed in March when the show premiered on screen. Eight boys and eight girls competed for a spot in the top 12. Four semifinalist the lowest vote getter from each gender and country got eliminated.

=== Top 16 - Semi-final ===
Order	Contestant	Song (original artist)	Result
1	Ladislava Maníčková	"Read All About It" (Emeli Sandé)	Eliminated
2	Jaroslav Smejkal	"Locked Out of Heaven" (Bruno Mars)	Safe
3	Martin Šafařík	"Use Somebody" (Kings Of Leon)	Safe
4	Kristína Debnárová	"The One That Got Away" (Katy Perry)	Safe
5	Jan Zamec	"Russian Roulette" (Rihanna)	Eliminated
6	Veronika Stýblová	"One Night Only" (Jennifer Hudson)	Safe
7	Karol Komenda	"Behind Blue Eyes" (Limp Bizkit)	Safe
8	Karolína Vrbová	"Irreplaceable" (Beyoncé Knowles)	Eliminated
9	Štefan Pčelár	"Feeling Good" (Muse)	Safe
10	Virgínia Buberníková	"Video Games" (Lana Del Rey)	Safe
11	Daniel Šmidák	"Troublemaker" (Olly Murs ft. Flo Rida)	Safe
12	Sabina Křováková	"Who Knew" (Pink)	Safe
13	Tereza Mandzáková	"(You Make Me Feel Like) A Natural Woman" (Aretha Franklin)	Safe
14	Mário Bendík	"Billionaire" (Travie McCoy ft. Bruno Mars)	Eliminated
15	Natálie Kubištová	"Crazy" (Gnarls Barkley)	Safe
16	Adam Kukačka	"Johnny B. Goode" (Chuck Berry)	Safe

== Finalist ==
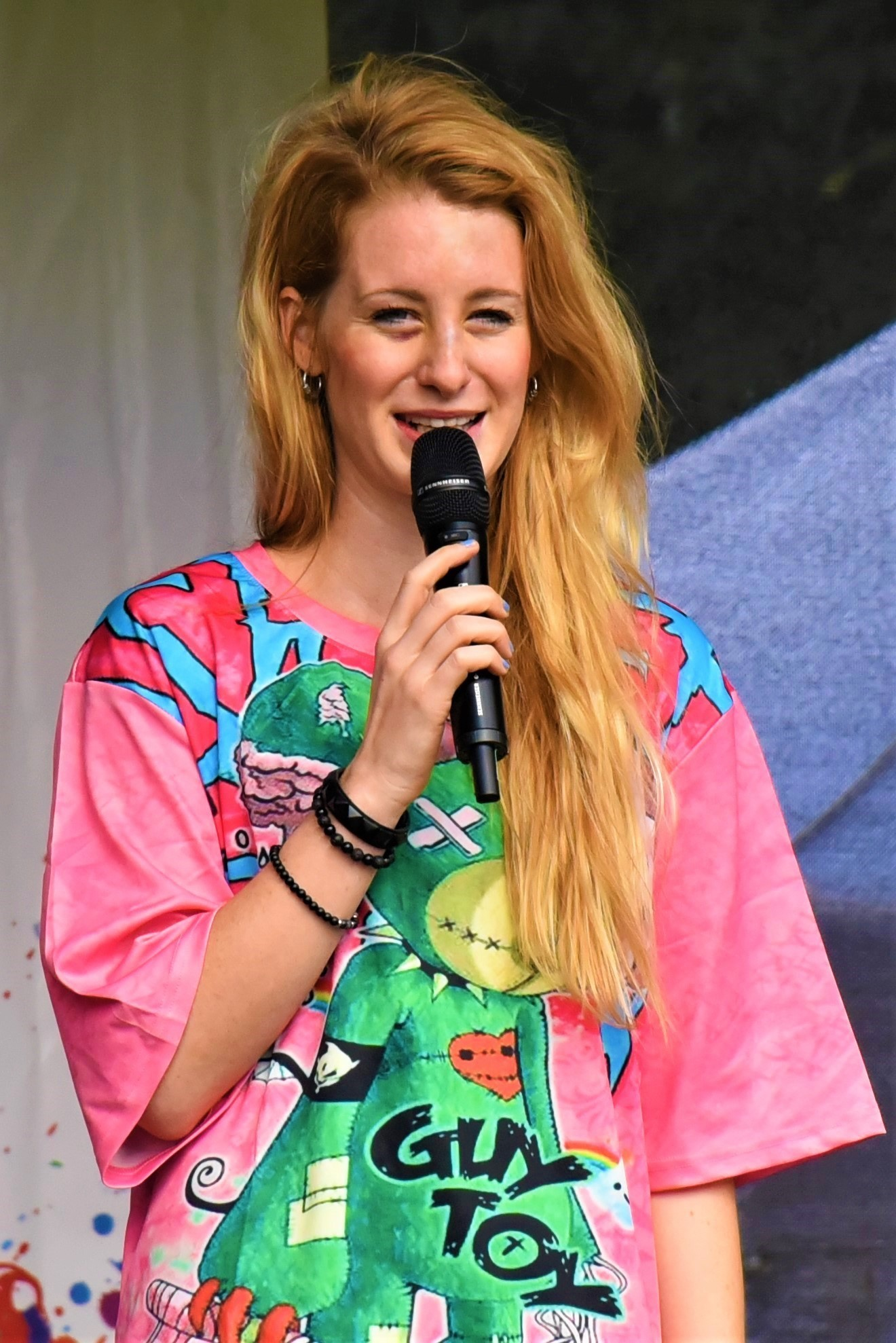
Winner Sabina Křováková

Contestant	Age	Hometown	Place finished
Sabina Křováková	20	Děčín, Czech Republic	Winner
Štefan Pčelár	25	Nitra, Slovakia	Runner-up
Adam Kukačka	16	Brno, Czech Republic	3rd
Martin Šafařík	21	Šternberk, Czech Republic	4th
Veronika Stýblová	18	Pardubice, Czech Republic	5th
Tereza Mandzáková	18	Snina, Slovakia	6th
Kristína Debnárová	17	Ružomberok, Slovakia	7th
Jaroslav Smejkal	21	Turnov, Czech Republic	8th
Virgínia Buberníková	19	Bratislava, Slovakia	9th
Daniel Šmidák	18	Ostrava, Czech Republic	10th
Karol Komenda	21	Prievidza, Slovakia	11th
Natálie Kubištová	19	Prague, Czech Republic	12th

== Finals ==
Twelve contestants made it to the finals. TOP 12 consists of 2 Slovak boys, 4 Czech boys, 3 Slovak girls and 3 Czech girls. The first single recorded by TOP 12 is called "Při tobě stát / Pri tebe stáť" (Stand next to you). Every final night has its theme. Audience can vote for contestants from the very beginning of the show, voting ends during result show on the same day.

=== Top 12 – No. 1 Hits ===
Order	Contestant	Song (original artist)	Result
1	Karol Komenda	"Are You Gonna Go My Way" (Lenny Kravitz)	Safe
2	Kristína Debnárová	"Run" (Leona Lewis)	Safe
3	Štefan Pčelár	"A Little Less Conversation" (Elvis Presley)	Safe
4	Virgínia Buberníková	"Empire State of Mind" (Alicia Keys)	Safe
5	Adam Kukačka	"Against All Odds" (Phil Collins)	Safe
6	Natálie Kubištová	"Raise Your Glass" (Pink)	Eliminated
7	Daniel Šmidák	"Hero" (Enrique Iglesias)	Safe
8	Veronika Stýblová	"Titanium" (David Guetta ft. Sia)	Safe
9	Martin Šafařík	"Iris" (Goo Goo Dolls)	Safe
10	Tereza Mandzáková	"A Moment Like This" (Kelly Clarkson)	Safe
11	Jaroslav Smejkal	"Light My Fire" (Will Young)	Safe
12	Sabina Křováková	"Survivor" (Die Happy)	Safe

=== Top 11 – Czech and Slovak Hits ===
Mentors: Miroslav Žbirka and Jan Ledecký

Order	Contestant	Song (original artist)	Result
1	Karol Komenda	"Cesta zakázanou rýchlosťou" (Miroslav Žbirka)	Eliminated
2	Kristína Debnárová	"Pokoj v duši" (Jana Kirschner)	Safe
3	Štefan Pčelár	"Bozk" (IMT Smile)	Safe
4	Virgínia Buberníková	"Láska" (Marcel Palonder)	Safe
5	Adam Kukačka	"Na kolena" (Ivan Hlas)	Safe
6	Daniel Šmidák	"Som na tebe závislý" (Desmod)	Safe
7	Veronika Stýblová	"Vokurky" (Lucie Bílá)	Safe
8	Martin Šafařík	"Proklínám" (Jan Ledecký)	Safe
9	Tereza Mandzáková	"Búrka" (Mária Čírová)	Safe
10	Jaroslav Smejkal	"Obchodník s deštěm" (Kryštof)	Safe
11	Sabina Křováková	"Sen" (Lucie)	Safe

=== Top 10 – Rock ===
Order	Contestant	Song (original artist)	Result
1	Kristína Debnárová	"Complicated" (Avril Lavigne)	Safe
2	Štefan Pčelár	"Beat It" (Fall Out Boy)	Safe
3	Virgínia Buberníková	"Enjoy the Silence" (Depeche Mode)	Safe
4	Adam Kukačka	"Rebel Yell" (Billy Idol)	Safe
5	Daniel Šmidák	"Mama, I'm Coming Home" (Ozzy Osbourne)	Eliminated
6	Veronika Stýblová	"Stay" (Shakespears Sister)	Safe
7	Martin Šafařík	"Enter Sandman" (Metallica)	Safe
8	Tereza Mandzáková	"Fuckin' Perfect" (Pink)	Safe
9	Jaroslav Smejkal	"Sex On Fire" (Kings of Leon)	Safe
10	Sabina Křováková	"I Don't Wanna Miss a Thing" (Aerosmith)	Safe

- Group performance: "Highway to Hell" (AC/DC)

=== Top 9 – Movie Songs ===
Order	Contestant	Song (original artist)	Result
1	Kristína Debnárová	"It Must Have Been Love" (Roxette)	Safe
2	Štefan Pčelár	"Kiss From a Rose" (Seal)	Safe
3	Virgínia Buberníková	"Perfect Day" (Duran Duran)	Eliminated
4	Adam Kukačka	"You Can Leave Your Hat On" (Joe Cocker)	Safe
5	Veronika Stýblová	"Skyfall" (Adele)	Safe
6	Martin Šafařík	"Hero" (Nickelback)	Safe
7	Tereza Mandzáková	"Son of a Preacher Man" (Dusty Springfield)	Safe
8	Jaroslav Smejkal	"Your Song" (Elton John)	Safe
9	Sabina Křováková	"All By Myself" (Céline Dion)	Safe

- Group performance: "Thriller" (Michael Jackson)

=== Top 8 – Legends ===
Order	Contestant	Song (original artist)	Result
1	Kristína Debnárová	"Believe" (Cher)	Safe
2	Štefan Pčelár	"Wish You Were Here" (Pink Floyd)	Safe
3	Adam Kukačka	"Lady Carneval" (Karel Gott)	Safe
4	Veronika Stýblová	"Vyznanie" (Marika Gombitová)	Safe
5	Martin Šafařík	"You Give Love a Bad Name" (Bon Jovi)	Safe
6	Tereza Mandzáková	"Angels" (Jessica Simpson)	Safe
7	Jaroslav Smejkal	"Every Breath You Take" (The Police)	Eliminated
8	Sabina Křováková	"The Show Must Go On" (Queen)	Safe

- Group performance:

TOP 8 - Girls: "Mamma Mia" (ABBA)
TOP 8 - Boys: "She Loves You" (The Beatles)

=== Top 7 – Idol's Choice ===
Order	Contestant	Song (original artist)	Result
1	Kristína Debnárová	"Family Portrait" (Pink)	Eliminated
2	Štefan Pčelár	"Viva la vida" (Coldplay)	Safe
3	Adam Kukačka	"Mad World" (Gary Jules)	Safe
4	Veronika Stýblová	"Strong Enough" (Cher)	Safe
5	Martin Šafařík	"Sexy and I Know It" (LMFAO)	Safe
6	Tereza Mandzáková	"Proud Mary" (Tina Turner)	Safe
7	Sabina Křováková	"Don't Cry" (Guns N' Roses)	Safe
8	Kristína Debnárová	"Nová" (Dominika Mirgová)	Eliminated
9	Štefan Pčelár	"Don't Stop Me Now" (Queen)	Safe
10	Adam Kukačka	"Jailhouse Rock" (Elvis Presley)	Safe
11	Veronika Stýblová	"Listen" (Beyoncé Knowles)	Safe
12	Martin Šafařík	"Něco končí" (Marek Ledecký)	Safe
13	Tereza Mandzáková	"Valerie" (Amy Winehouse)	Safe
14	Sabina Křováková	"Fighter" (Christina Aguilera)	Safe

=== Top 6 – Love Songs ===
Order	Contestant	Song (original artist)	Result
1	Štefan Pčelár	"Wonderwall" (Oasis)	Safe
2	Adam Kukačka	"I Do It for You" (Bryan Adams)	Safe
3	Veronika Stýblová	"Without You" (Mariah Carey)	Safe
4	Martin Šafařík	"What Goes Around... Comes Around" (Justin Timberlake)	Safe
5	Tereza Mandzáková	"The Power of Love" (Frankie Goes to Hollywood)	Eliminated
6	Sabina Křováková	"Love The Way You Lie" (Rihanna)	Safe
7	Štefan Pčelár	"Ak nie si moja" (Václav Patejdl)	Safe
8	Adam Kukačka	"Jasná zpráva" (Olympic)	Safe
9	Veronika Stýblová	"Víš lásko" (Iveta Bartošová)	Safe
10	Martin Šafařík	"Dotknu se ohně" (Lucie)	Safe
11	Tereza Mandzáková	"Vráť mi tie hviezdy" (Beáta Dubasová)	Eliminated
12	Sabina Křováková	"Už nejsem volná" (Petra Janů)	Safe

=== Top 5 – 1990s ===
Order	Contestant	Song (original artist)	Result
1	Štefan Pčelár	"Strong" (Robbie Williams)	Safe
2	Adam Kukačka	"Can't Help Falling in Love" (Elvis Presley)	Safe
3	Veronika Stýblová	"...Baby One More Time" (Britney Spears)	Eliminated
4	Martin Šafařík	"Candle In The Wind" (Elton John)	Safe
5	Sabina Křováková	"What's Up?" (4 Non Blondes)	Safe
6	Štefan Pčelár	"Easy" (Faith No More)	Safe
7	Adam Kukačka	"Losing My Religion" (R.E.M.)	Safe
8	Veronika Stýblová	"Nothing Compares 2 U" (Sinéad O'Connor)	Eliminated
9	Martin Šafařík	"Bitter Sweet Symphony" (The Verve)	Safe
10	Sabina Křováková	"Bitch" (Meredith Brooks)	Safe

- Group performance: "One" (U2)

=== Top 4 – Public's choice ===
Order	Contestant	Song (original artist)	Result
1	Štefan Pčelár	"Impossible" (James Arthur)	Safe
2	Adam Kukačka	"Oh, Pretty Woman" (Roy Orbison)	Safe
3	Martin Šafařík	"Love Me Tender" (Elvis Presley)	Eliminated
4	Sabina Křováková	"Cry Baby" (Janis Joplin)	Safe
5	Štefan Pčelár	"Hollywood Hills" (Sunrise Avenue)	Safe
6	Adam Kukačka	"She's So High" (Kurt Nielsen)	Safe
7	Martin Šafařík	"In My Head" (Jason Derülo)	Eliminated
8	Sabina Křováková	"Rolling in the Deep" (Adele)	Safe
9	Sabina Křováková & Martin Šafařík	"Stay" (Rihanna & Mikky Ekko )	N/A
10	Štefan Pčelár & Adam Kukačka	"Don't Let the Sun Go Down on Me" (Elton John & George Michael )	N/A

=== Top 3 – Summer Hits ===
Order	Contestant	Song (original artist)	Result
1	Štefan Pčelár	"Balada" (Gusttavo Lima)	Safe
2	Adam Kukačka	"Summer of '69" (Bryan Adams)	Eliminated
3	Sabina Křováková	"Summer Son" (Texas)	Safe
4	Štefan Pčelár	"Can't Take My Eyes Off You" (James Arthur)	Safe
5	Adam Kukačka	"The Lazy Song" (Bruno Mars)	Eliminated
6	Sabina Křováková	"California Gurls" (Katy Perry)	Safe
7	Štefan Pčelár	"Over the Rainbow" (Israel Kamakawiwo'ole)	Safe
8	Adam Kukačka	"Summer in the City" (Joe Cocker)	Eliminated
9	Sabina Křováková	"So What" (Pink)	Safe

- Group performance: "Summer Nights" (Grease)

=== Top 2 – Grand Final ===
Order	Contestant	Song (original artist)	Result
1	Štefan Pčelár	"Paradise" (Coldplay)	Runner-up
2	Sabina Křováková	"One of Us" (Joan Osborne)	Winner
3	Štefan Pčelár	"Dance with Somebody" (Mando Diao)	Runner-up
4	Sabina Křováková	"La La" (Ashlee Simpson)	Winner
5	Štefan Pčelár	"Set Fire to the Rain" (Adele)	Runner-up
6	Sabina Křováková	"Still Loving You" (Scorpions)	Winner
7	Štefan Pčelár	"Impossible" (James Arthur)	Runner-up
8	Sabina Křováková	"Cry Baby" (Janis Joplin)	Winner
9	Sabina Křováková & Štefan Pčelár	"Just Give Me a Reason" (Pink ft. Nate Ruess )	N/A

== Elimination chart ==
Legend
Female	Male	Top 16	Top 12	Winner

Safe	Safe First	Safe Last	Eliminated

Stage:		Semi-Finals	Finals										
Week:		3/17	3/24	3/31	4/7	4/14	4/21	4/28	5/5	5/12	5/19	5/26	6/2
Place	Contestant	Result											
1	Sabina Křováková	Safe	Safe	Safe	Safe	Safe	Safe	Safe	Safe	Safe	Safe	Safe	Winner
2	Štefan Pčelár	Safe	Top 3	Safe	Safe	Safe	Safe	Safe	Safe	Safe	Safe	Safe	Runner-up
3	Adam Kukačka	Safe	Top 3	Safe	Safe	Safe	Safe	Safe	Safe	Safe	Safe	Eliminated	
4	Martin Šafařík	Safe	Safe	Safe	Safe	Safe	Safe	Safe	Safe	Safe	Eliminated		
5	Veronika Stýblová	Safe	Top 3	Safe	Safe	Safe	Safe	Safe	Safe	Eliminated			
6	Tereza Mandzáková	Safe	Safe	Safe	Safe	Safe	Safe	Safe	Eliminated				
7	Kristína Debnárová	Safe	Safe	Safe	Safe	Safe	Safe	Eliminated					
8	Jaroslav Smejkal	Safe	Safe	Safe	Safe	Safe	Eliminated						
9	Virgínia Buberníková	Safe	Safe	Safe	Safe	Eliminated							
10	Daniel Šmidák	Safe	Safe	Safe	Eliminated								
11	Karol Komenda	Safe	Safe	Eliminated									
12	Natálie Kubištová	Safe	Eliminated										
13-16	Karolína Vrbová	Eliminated											
13-16	Mário Bendík	Eliminated											
13-16	Ladislava Maníčková	Eliminated											
13-16	Jan Zamec	Eliminated											

== Contestants who appeared on other seasons/shows ==
- Veronika Stýblová was a finalist on Česko Slovensko má talent season 1.
