= Česko Slovenská SuperStar season 4 =

Česko Slovenská SuperStar
- Season 4
- Hosted by: Martin "Pyco" Rausch; Jitka Nováčková
- Judges: Ondřej Soukup; Marta Jandová; Pavol Habera; Klára Vytisková
- Winner: Emma Drobná
- Runner-up: Štěpán Urban
- Finals venue: Barrandov Studios

Release
- Original network: Nova; Markíza
- Original release: August 30 – December 6, 2015

Season chronology
- ← Previous; Season 3 Next → Season 5

Česko Slovenská SuperStar (English: Czech&Slovak SuperStar) is the joint Czech-Slovak version of Idol series' Pop Idol merged from Česko hledá SuperStar and Slovensko hľadá SuperStar which previous to that had three individual seasons each. The fourth season premiered in autumn 2015 with castings held in Prague, Brno, Ostrava, Žilina, Bratislava and Košice. It is broadcast on two channels: «TV Nova» (Czech Republic) and «Markíza» (Slovakia) which have also been the broadcast stations for the individual seasons. Also both hosts have been their hosts countries before as have been three out of the four judges.

== Regional auditions ==
Auditions were held in Bratislava, Košice, Prague, Ostrava, Žilina and Brno in the summer of 2015.

Audition City	Date
Košice, Slovakia	May 16, 2015
Žilina, Slovakia	May 17, 2015
Ostrava, Czech Republic	May 23, 2015
Brno, Czech Republic	May 24, 2015
Bratislava, Slovakia	May 30, 2015
Prague, Czech Republic	June 5–6, 2015

== Veľký výber ==
In Veľký výber where 100 contestants. The contestants first emerged on stage in groups of 9 or 10 but performed solo unaccompanied, and those who did not impress the judges were cut after the group finished their individual performances. 40 made it to the next round held in beach. Contestants will sing in duet. Next round is Dlouhá cesta. 20 contestants made it to the Semi-final.

== Semi-final ==
20 semifinalists will revealed in October when the show premiered on screen. Ten boys and ten girls competed for a spot in the top 8. From each semi final 4 contestant will made it to the final. Public will choose one contestant and other three will be chosen by jury.

=== Top 10 - Boys ===
Order	Contestant	Song (original artist)	Result
1	Vojtěch Dzudza	"One and Only" (Adele)	Eliminated
2	Dalibor Slepčík	"It Will Rain" (Bruno Mars)	Advanced
3	Peter Farkašovský	"Who You Are" (Jessie J)	Eliminated
4	Samuel Sleziak	"Love's Divine" (Seal)	Eliminated
5	Pavol Kovaliček	"Heaven" (Bryan Adams)	Advanced
6	Štěpán Urban	"Mad World" (Gary Jules)	Advanced
7	Jan Tejkal	"Story of My Life" (One Direction)	Eliminated
8	Marek Pošta	"Photograph" (Ed Sheeran)	Eliminated
9	Daniel Křižka	"Blame It on Me" (George Ezra)	Advanced
10	Patricio Malundo	"Candle in the Wind" (Elton John)	Eliminated

=== Top 10 - Girls ===
Order	Contestant	Song (original artist)	Result
1	Réka Ballová	"Ain't Nobody" (Chaka Khan)	Eliminated
2	Veronika Vrublová	"Love Me like You Do" (Ellie Goulding)	Eliminated
3	Sabina Slepčíková	"Run to You" (Whitney Houston)	Advanced
4	Veronika Danišová	"Rolling in the Deep" (Adele)	Advanced
5	Barbora Hazuchová	"Jar of Hearts" (Christina Perri)	Advanced
6	Melinda Noáková	"Over the Love" (Florence and the Machine)	Eliminated
7	Alena Shirmanova	"Theme from New York, New York" (Frank Sinatra)	Eliminated
8	Karolína Přibylová	"I See Fire" (Ed Sheeran)	Eliminated
9	Nikol Kassell	"Love on Top" (Beyoncé)	Eliminated
10	Emma Drobná	"Your Song" (Elton John)	Advanced

== Finalist ==
Contestant	Age	Hometown	Place finished
Emma Drobná	21	Nové Mesto nad Váhom, Slovakia	Winner
Štěpán Urban	17	Uherské Hradiště, Czech Republic	Runner-up
Pavol Kovaliček	19	Dežerice, Slovakia	3rd
Dalibor Slepčík	15	Ústí nad Labem, Czech Republic	4th
Veronika Danišová	21	Partizánske, Slovakia	5th
Sabina Slepčíková	23	Ústí nad Labem, Czech Republic	6th
Barbora Hazuchová	17	Liptovský Mikuláš, Slovakia	7th
Daniel Křižka	20	Brumovice, Czech Republic	8th

== Finals ==
Eight contestants made it to the finals. TOP 8 consists of 1 Slovak boy, 3 Czech boys, 3 Slovak girls and 1 Czech girl. The first single recorded by TOP 8 is cover version of Česko Slovenská SuperStar 2009 theme song "Príbeh nekončí" (The Story Doesn't End). Every final night has its theme. Audience can vote for contestants from the very beginning of the show, voting ends during result show on the same day.

=== Top 8 – No. 1 Hits ===
Order	Contestant	Song (original artist)	Result
1	Dalibor Slepčík	"Billie Jean" (Michael Jackson)	Safe
2	Sabina Slepčíková	"All About That Bass" (Meghan Trainor)	Safe
3	Daniel Křižka	"You're Beautiful" (James Blunt)	Eliminated
4	Barbora Hazuchová	"Titanium" (Sia)	Bottom 3
5	Štěpán Urban	"I'm Yours" (Jason Mraz)	Bottom 3
6	Emma Drobná	"Habits" (Tove Lo)	Safe
7	Pavol Kovaliček	"Demons" (Imagine Dragons)	Safe
8	Veronika Danišová	"No One" (Alicia Keys)	Safe

=== Top 7 – Movies Night ===
Order	Contestant	Song (original artist)	Movie	Result
1	Dalibor Slepčík	"Do věží" (Waldemar Matuška)	A Night at Karlstein	Safe
2	Sabina Slepčíková	"It Must Have Been Love" (Roxette)	Pretty Woman	Bottom 3
3	Barbora Hazuchová	"Skyfall" (Adele)	Skyfall	Eliminated
4	Štěpán Urban	"Hallelujah" (Leonard Cohen)	Shrek	Bottom 3
5	Emma Drobná	"Čerešne" (Zuzana Kronerová)	Cosy Dens	Safe
6	Pavol Kovaliček	"I Don't Want to Miss a Thing" (Aerosmith)	Armageddon	Safe
7	Veronika Danišová	"Let It Go" (Idina Menzel)	Frozen	Safe

- Group performance:

TOP 7 - Girls: "A Little Party Never Killed Nobody" (Fergie)
TOP 7 - Boys: "Oh, Pretty Woman" (Roy Orbison)

=== Top 6 – Czech and Slovak Hits ===
Order	Contestant	Song (original artist)	Result
1	Dalibor Slepčík	"Pár přátel stačí mít" (Michal David)	Safe
2	Sabina Slepčíková	"Teď královnou jsem já" (Monika Absolonová)	Bottom 3
3	Štěpán Urban	"Chci zas v tobě spát" (Lucie)	Saved
4	Emma Drobná	"Pokoj v duši" (Jana Kirschner)	Safe
5	Pavol Kovaliček	"Zbohom buď, lipová lyžka" (Michal Dočolomanský)	Safe
6	Veronika Danišová	"Atlantída" (Miroslav Žbirka)	Bottom 3
7	Dalibor Slepčík & Veronika Danišová	"Zvonky štěstí" (Karel Gott & Dara Rolins)	N/A
8	Sabina Slepčíková & Pavol Kovaliček	"Čo bolí to prebolí" (Miroslav Žbirka & Martha)	N/A
9	Emma Drobná & Štěpán Urban	"Cudzinka v tvojej zemi" (Xindl X & Mirka Miškechová)	N/A

=== Top 6 – Songs of Legends ===
Order	Contestant	Song (original artist)	Result
1	Dalibor Slepčík	"Když jsem já byl tenkrát kluk" (Karel Gott)	Bottom 3
2	Sabina Slepčíková	"Hurt" (Christina Aguilera)	Eliminated
3	Štěpán Urban	"Come as You Are" (Nirvana)	Safe
4	Emma Drobná	"Fix You" (Coldplay)	Safe
5	Pavol Kovaliček	"It's My Life" (Bon Jovi)	Safe
6	Veronika Danišová	"Queen of the Night" (Whitney Houston)	Eliminated
7	Dalibor Slepčík	"Isn't She Lovely" (Stevie Wonder)	Bottom 3
8	Sabina Slepčíková	"The Winner Takes It All" (ABBA)	Eliminated
9	Štěpán Urban	"Angie" (The Rolling Stones)	Safe
10	Emma Drobná	"Valerie" (Amy Winehouse)	Safe
11	Pavol Kovaliček	"Od Tatier k Dunaju" (Elán)	Safe
12	Veronika Danišová	"Hero" (Mariah Carey)	Eliminated

=== Top 4 – Hits of Decades ===
Order	Contestant	Song (original artist)	Result
1	Dalibor Slepčík	"I Believe I Can Fly" (R. Kelly)	Eliminated
2	Štěpán Urban	"Wish You Were Here" (Pink Floyd)	Safe
3	Emma Drobná	"Feeling Good" (Nina Simone)	Safe
4	Pavol Kovaliček	"Right Here Waiting" (Richard Marx)	Bottom 2
5	Dalibor Slepčík	"Love Never Felt So Good" (Michael Jackson and Justin Timberlake)	Eliminated
6	Štěpán Urban	"Sex on Fire" (Kings of Leon)	Safe
7	Emma Drobná	"Love the Way You Lie" (Eminem ft. Rihanna)	Safe
8	Pavol Kovaliček	"Numb" (Linkin Park)	Bottom 2

=== Top 3 – Grand Final ===
Order	Contestant	Song (original artist)	Result
1	Štěpán Urban	"Půlnoční" (Václav Neckář)	Runner-up
2	Emma Drobná	"All I Want for Christmas Is You" (Mariah Carey)	Winner
3	Pavol Kovaliček	"Poďme bratia do Betléma" (Tublatanka)	2nd Runner-up
4	Štěpán Urban	"Angie" (The Rolling Stones)	Runner-up
5	Emma Drobná	"Fix You" (Coldplay)	Winner
6	Pavol Kovaliček	"Zbohom buď lipová lyžka" (Michal Dočolomanský)	2nd Runner-up
7	Štěpán Urban	"Dancing in the Dark" (Bruce Springsteen)	Runner-up
8	Emma Drobná	"Toxic" (Britney Spears)	Winner
9	Pavol Kovaliček	"More Than Words" (Extreme)	2nd Runner-up

== Elimination chart ==
Legend
Female	Male	Top 20	Top 8	Winner

Did Not Perform	Safe	Safe First	Safe Last	Eliminated

Stage:		Semi-Finals		Finals						
Week:		10/18	10/25	11/1	11/8	11/15	11/22	11/29	12/6	
Place	Contestant	Result								
1	Emma Drobná		Safe	Safe	Safe	Safe	Safe	Safe	Safe	Winner
2	Štěpán Urban	Safe		Bottom 2	Bottom 2	Saved	Safe	Safe	Safe	Runner-up
3	Pavol Kovaliček	Safe		Safe	Safe	Safe	Safe	Bottom 2	Eliminated	
4	Dalibor Slepčík	Safe		Safe	Safe	Safe	Bottom 3	Eliminated		
5	Veronika Danišová		Safe	Safe	Safe	Bottom 3	Eliminated			
6	Sabina Slepčíková		Safe	Safe	Bottom 3	Bottom 2	Eliminated			
7	Barbora Hazuchová		Safe	Bottom 3	Eliminated					
8	Daniel Křižka	Safe		Eliminated						
Semi- Final 2	Réka Ballová		Eliminated							
Semi- Final 2	Veronika Vrublová		Eliminated							
Semi- Final 2	Melinda Noáková		Eliminated							
Semi- Final 2	Alena Shirmanova		Eliminated							
Semi- Final 2	Karolína Přibylová		Eliminated							
Semi- Final 2	Nikol Kassell		Eliminated							
Semi- Final 1	Vojtěch Dzudza	Eliminated								
Semi- Final 1	Peter Farkašovský	Eliminated								
Semi- Final 1	Samuel Sleziak	Eliminated								
Semi- Final 1	Jan Tejkal	Eliminated								
Semi- Final 1	Marek Pošta	Eliminated								
Semi- Final 1	Patricio Malundo	Eliminated								

== Contestants who appeared on other seasons/shows ==
- Veronika Vrublová was an artist on the first season of The Voice, joined Team Josef Vojtek and eliminated during first Live show.
- Alena Shirmanova, under her stage name Aiko, competed in ESCZ 2024, the Czech selection for the Eurovision Song Contest 2024, and won, going on to represent the country in the event.
