= Nespáľme to krásne v nás =

- The artists promoting the song at the Slovak annual awards "Slávik", after a wide range of publicity that followed Gombitová's frustration concerning the final version of their work.

Single by Miro Žbirka and Marika Gombitová

from the album Modrý album
- Released: 2001
- Recorded: 2001
- Genre: Pop music
- Length: 3:22
- Label: Universal
- Songwriters: Miro Žbirka; Kamil Peteraj
- Producers: Aleš Zenkl; Honza Horáček; Miro Žbirka

Marika Gombitová singles chronology
| "Paradiso" (1994) | "Nespáľme to krásne v nás" (2001) | "Ten príbeh za náš sen stál" (2015) |

Audio sample
- "Nespáľme to krásne v nás": file; help

Music video
- "Nespáľme to krásne v nás" on YouTube

Nespáľme to krásne v nás (English: Let's Not Burn The Beauty In Us) is a song by Miro Žbirka and Marika Gombitová released on Universal in 2001.

The duet was the first collaboration of the artists since their common hit "V slepých uličkách" from 1980. Originally, the composition was issued on the Žbirka's twelfth studio set Modrý album (2003), while available also on the Gombitová's multi-platinum greatest hits compilation Vyznanie (2007) in addition.

In 2005, the artists recorded altogether another song called "Tajnosľubná", which was used as the main theme of a TV-series Medzi nami.

== Credits and personnel ==
- Miro Žbirka - writer, lead vocals, co-producer
- Marika Gombitová - lead vocal
- Kamil Peteraj - lyrics
- Aleš Zenkl - producer
- Honza Horáček - producer

== Official versions ==
1. "Nespáľme to krásne v nás" - Studio version I, 2001
2. "Nespáľme to krásne v nás" - Studio version II, 2001

== Controversies ==
Initially, the composition was to be premiered at the Slovak national beauty pageant show Miss Slovakia. However, Gombitová refused to appear that night, claiming that she had not been satisfied with the final version. Žbirka had to perform only himself, eventually, presenting one of his solo tracks. The case was widely discussed by Slovak and Czech media, by means of which, Gombitová urged Žbirka to re-arrange the song.

Furthermore, according to the authors of Gombitová's 2008 self-titled biography, the duet should have been released on the Žbirka's album without a prior permission from the female vocalist and, therefore, she was not paid for her featured contribution. Žbirka turned down such charges. After an agreement that followed six months later, both artists in person presented the work (in the meantime re-arranged as claimed in behalf of Gombitová) during the Slovak annual awards "Slávik" in 2001, at Istropolis in Bratislava. In 2005, they worked together back again on "Tajnosľubná", which was released on the Žbirka's following album Dúhy (Universal).
