= Tajnosľubná =

Song by Marika Gombitová & Miro Žbirka

from the album Dúhy
- Language: Slovak
- Released: 2005
- Genre: Pop rock
- Length: 3:08
- Label: Universal
- Composer: Miro Žbirka
- Lyricist: Kamil Peteraj
- Producer: Honza Horáček

Audio sample
- "Tajnosľubná": file; help

Tajnosľubná (Promising in Secret) is a duet by Marika Gombitová and Miro Žbirka, released on Universal Music in 2005.

The song was written by the male vocalist and appeared on his thirteenth studio album entitled Dúhy (2005). In addition, the composition was attached to Gombitová's double greatest hits album Vyznanie (2007), and along with their previously recorded duets, such as "V slepých uličkách" (from 1980) and "Nespáľme to krásne v nás" (from 2001).

Eventually, "Tajnosľubná" charted on the Czech component airplay chart at number thirty-five.

== Official versions ==
1. "Tajnosľubná" – Original version, 2005

== Credits and personnel ==
- Marika Gombitová – lead vocal
- Miro Žbirka – lead vocal, writer
- Honza Horáček – producer
- Kamil Peteraj – lyrics

== Charts ==
Chart (2007)	Peak position
Rádio CZ 50 Oficiální	35
