= Peklo milencov =

Single by Marika Gombitová

from the album Zostaň
- Released: 1994
- Recorded: 1994
- Genre: Pop
- Length: 3:53
- Label: Jumbo (#0023 3331)
- Songwriters: Marika Gombitová, Kamil Peteraj
- Producer: Vašo Patejdl

Marika Gombitová singles chronology
| "Tváre pred zrkadlom" (1989) | "Peklo milencov" (1994) | "Tak som chcela všetkých milovať" (2007) |

Audio sample
- "Peklo milencov": file; help

"Peklo milencov" (Lovers' Hell) is a song by Marika Gombitová released on Jumbo Records in 1994.

The composition wrote Gombitová in common with Kamil Peteraj, and was issued as B-side on single "Paradiso", also written by themselves. Both songs were released on the singer's last studio album to date Zostaň (1994).

== Official versions ==
1. "Peklo milencov" – Studio version, 1994

== Credits and personnel ==
- Marika Gombitová – songwriter, lead vocal
- Kamil Peteraj – lyrics
- Vašo Patejdl – producer
- Jumbo Records – copyright
