= Lucie Bílá discography =

- Studio albums: 16
- Extended plays: 2
- Soundtrack albums: 3
- Live albums: 3
- Compilation albums: 4
- Singles: 22
- B-sides: 4
- Video albums: 5
- Spoken word albums: 1
- Limited editions: 1
- Box sets: 1

== Albums ==
=== Studio albums ===
Year	Album details	Peak	Sales	Certifications
Year	Album details	CZ	Sales	Certifications
1986	Lucie Bílá (I): Label: Supraphon (#1113 4365); Format: LP	?		
1992	Missariel: Label: Monitor-EMI (#010075-2331); Format: CD	?		
1994	Lucie Bílá (II): Label: Monitor-EMI (#660340-2331); Format: CD, CC	?		
1997	Duety with Karel Gott: Label: Monitor-EMI (#72438 21828); Format: CD	?	CZ: 165,000	
1998	Hvězdy jako hvězdy: Label: Monitor-EMI (#72434 96373); Format: CD, CC	1	CZ: 100,000	Multi-platinum
1999	Úplně nahá: Label: Monitor-EMI (#72435 22756); Format: CD	?		Platinum
2003	Jampadampa: Label: Monitor-EMI (#72435 93858); Format: CD, CC	1	CZ: 80,000	
2007	Woman: Label: Monitor-EMI (#50999 5 09367); Format: CD, DVD	1		
2009	Bang! Bang!: Label: Monitor-EMI (#50999 4 58671); Format: CD	1		
2010	Bíle Vánoce: Label: Supraphon (#SU 6008); Format: CD	1	CZ: 39,000	3× Platinum
2012	Modi: Label: Supraphon; Format: CD			
2014	Recitál: Label: Supraphon (#SU 6247–2); Format: CD			
2014	Diamond Collection: Label: Supraphon (#825646205943); Format: CD			
2016	Hana: Label: Supraphon (#SU 6266–2); Format: CD			
2017	Bílé Vánoce Lucie Bílé II.: Label: Supraphon (#SU 6396–2); Format: CD			
2018	Duety with Karel Gott: Label: Supraphon (#9029554947); Format: CD			
2019	Ta o mně: Label: Supraphon (#SU 6529–2); Format: CD			

=== Compilations ===
Year	Album details	Peak	Sales	Certifications
Year	Album details	CZ	Sales	Certifications
2004	Láska je láska: Label: Monitor-EMI (#72438 63771); Format: CD	4		
2007	Platinum Collection: Label: Monitor-Emi (#09463 91695); Format: 3xCD	30		
2008	Gold: Label: Monitor-EMI (#50999 2 15284); Format: CD	—		
2011	Duety naBílo: Label: Monitor-EMI (#50999 0 98108); Format: CD, DVD	2		

=== Live albums ===
Year	Album details	Peak	Sales	Certifications
Year	Album details	CZ	Sales	Certifications
1997	Koncert hvězd na Žofíně with P.Dvorský and E.Urbanová: Label: Monitor-EMI (#72438 33280); Format: CD	?		
2006	Koncert: Label: Monitor-EMI (#50999 2 15546); Format: CD	15		
2008	Lucerna: Label: Monitor-EMI (#09463 61627); Format: CD	44		

=== Soundtracks ===
Year	Album details	Peak
Year	Album details	CZ
1993	Fontána pre Zuzanu 2: Label: Tommü Records (#610049-2331); Format: CD, DVD	
2008	Carmen: Label: Monitor-EMI; Format: CD	15
2011	V peřině: Label: Universal; Format: CD	7

=== Limited editions ===
Year	Album details
2010	Bang! Bang! / Hvězdy jako hvězdy: Label: EMI; Format: 2xCD

=== Box sets ===
Year	Album details	Peak
Year	Album details	CZ
2003	Komplet: Label: EMI; Format: 5xCD	67

=== Spoken word ===
Year	Album details
2008	Moja a Páv: Gorilí pohádky a písničky: Label: Monitor-EMI (#50999 2 06196); Format: CD Audiobook

== Extended plays ==
Year	EP details
1992	(OST) Requiem pro panenku: Label: Monitor (#010046-2331); Format: CD, CC
1994	Zahrada rajských potěšení II: Label: Monitor-EMI (#660273-2331); Format: CD

== Singles ==
Year	Single details	Peak				Album	Label
Year	Single details	CZ		SK		Album	Label
Year	Single details	50	100	50	100	Album	Label
1986	"Neposlušné tenisky"					Lucie Bílá	Supraphon
1986	"Neobjevená"					Lucie Bílá	Supraphon
1987	"Gejša" with Jiří Vondráček					non-album single	Supraphon
1989	"Já chci změnu"					non-album single	Supraphon
Airplay singles
2006	"Vokurky"	25	—	—	—	Koncert	EMI
2006	"Ulice"	35	—	—	—	Koncert	EMI
2007	"Miluji tě (Woman)"	24	72	—	—	Woman	EMI
2008	"Doufám"	28	—	—	—	Woman	EMI
2009	"Stůj"	46	—	—	—	Lucerna	EMI
2009	"eSeMeS"	27	—	—	—	Lucerna	EMI
2009	"Jsi můj pán"	24	—	—	—	Lucerna	EMI
2010	"Život vypadal krásně"	29	—	—	—	Bang! Bang!	EMI
2010	"Zpíváš mi requiem"	42	—	—	—	BS-Bang! Bang!	EMI
2010	"Láska je láska"	48	—	—	—		EMI
2010	"Samota" with Kamil Střihavka	30	—	—	—	(OST) Kajínek	Supraphon
2010	"Tambor"	24	—	—	—	Bíle Vánoce	Supraphon
2011	"Most přes minulost"	50	—	—	—		EMI
2011	"Zítřejší ráno" feat. Josef Vojtek	5	39	—	—		
2011	"Žily" with No Name	15	73	—	—	Duety naBílo	EMI
2011	"S ním ať jen sním"	9	51	—	—	V peřině	Universal
2011	"Ženušky" with No Name	9	34	14	92	Nový album	Sony BMG
2011	"Desatero"	11	48	—	—	Bang! Bang!	EMI
"—" denotes a single that did not chart or was not released in that region.

== Videos ==
=== Video albums ===
Year	Album details	Peak
Year	Album details	CZ
2006	Láska je láska: 20 videohitů: Label: EMI (#72435 44253); Format: DVD	5
2006	Koncert: Label: EMI (#50999 8 15546); Format: DVD	1
2008	Lucerna: Label: EMI (#09463 61627); Format: 2xDVD	13
2010	Láska je láska/Elixír života: Label: Bon Art (#594070 210053); Format: 2xDVD	14
2011	Duety naBílo: Label: EMI (#50999 0 98108); Format: DVD	1

== Other appearances ==
- 1995: Duny by Jiří Korn
- 1996: Citová investice by Petr Hapka and Michal Horáček
- 2001: Mohlo by tu být líp by Petr Hapka and Michal Horáček (on "Unesený" and "Okna dokořán")
- 2008: Kouzelné Vánoce - with Boni Pueri and Karel Gott (#8)
- 2009: Kouzelné Vánoce II - with Boni Pueri (#20, 5 weeks on the chart)
- Soukromé poselství – with Komorní filharmonie Pardubice
- Znamení by České srdce (on "Bosou nohou žárem")

== See also ==
- The 100 Greatest Slovak Albums of All Time
