= Paradiso (song) =

- A screenshot of the official music video

Single by Marika Gombitová

from the album Zostaň
- B-side: "Peklo milencov"
- Released: 1994
- Genre: Dance-pop
- Length: 4:18
- Label: Jumbo Records (#0023 3331)
- Songwriters: Marika Gombitová; Kamil Peteraj
- Producer: Vašo Patejdl

Marika Gombitová singles chronology
"Tváre pred zrkadlom" (1989)	"Paradiso" (1994)	"Nespáľme to krásne v nás" (2001)

Audio sample
- "Paradiso": file; help

Music video
- "Paradiso" on YouTube

Paradiso (English: Paradise) is a song by Marika Gombitová released on Jumbo Records in 1994.

The music for the lyrics by Kamil Peteraj wrote the singer, while a video was directed by Katarína Ďurovičová, winning in addition the annual Zlatý Triangel (English: Golden Triangle) award in 1995. Apart from being issued on the artist's nine studio set Zostaň.

== Official versions ==
1. "Paradiso" - Studio version, 1994

== Credits and personnel ==
- Marika Gombitová - lead vocal, music
- Vašo Patejdl - arranger, programming, keyboards, chorus
- Štefan Hegeds - arranger, programming, keyboards
- Henry Tóth - guitars
- Jana Kütreiberová - chorus
- Elena Matušová - chorus
- Marcel Palonder - chorus
- Jozef Krajčovič - sound director, technical coordination, mix
- Relax H&V - studio

== Awards ==
=== Triangel ===
Zlatý Triangel (English: Golden Triangle) was an annual video chart also broadcast by the public television network Slovenská televízia from 1984 to 1997. The show, originally hosted by Tatiana Kulíšková and Pavol Juráň, and since November 1989 by Daniel Junas, awarded exclusively Slovak and Czech artists for the best videos released in a calendar year, similarly as the MTV music channel. Prior to that, its monthly editions called Triangel were held. In total, Gombitová won four annual charts (in 1985–86, 1988 and 1995).

Year	Nominated work	Category	Result
1995	"Paradiso"	Best Video	Won
