= Kam idú ľudia? =

Studio album by Marika Gombitová
- Released: Summer 1990
- Recorded: 1989–90
- Genre: Pop rock
- Length: 47:53
- Label: OPUS (#9353 2214)
- Producer: Peter Smolinský

Marika Gombitová chronology
Slávnosť úprimných slov (1987)	Kam idú ľudia? (1990)	Polnočné otázky: 16 Naj 1984–1993 (1993)

Kam idú ľudia? (English: Where Do People Go?) is the eighth solo album by Marika Gombitová released on OPUS in 1990. The title song was dedicated to Stevie Wonder.

== Track listing ==
All tracks are written by Gombitová and Peteraj, unless stated otherwise

No.	Title	Writer(s)	Length
1.	"Babylónia"		5:15
2.	"Rád si menil popol na hviezdy"		4:20
3.	"Polnočné otázky"		4:58
4.	"Rádio Láska"	Šeban; Peteraj	4:15
5.	"Kríž"	Šeban; Peteraj	4:53
6.	"Úlomky spomienok" (tribute to Chinese poetry)		5:23
7.	"Dvaja"	Šeban; Peteraj	3:39
8.	"Žiadny hazard na účet srdca"		4:59
9.	"Strom 2000"		3:04
10.	"Kam idú ľudia?" (dedicated to Stevie Wonder)		6:07
Total length:			47:53

Kam idú ľudia?: Komplet 8 (Bonus tracks)
No.	Title	Writer(s)	Length
11.	"Nenápadná"		3:35
12.	"Mami, mami" (taken from SP "Nenápadná")		3:50
13.	"Tváre pred zrkadlom"		3:29
14.	"Ave Mária" (taken from SP "Tváre pred zrkadlom")	Dušík; Peteraj	4:56
Total length:			63:43

== Official releases ==
- 1990: Kam idú ľudia?, LP, MC, OPUS, #9353 2214
- 1990: Kam idú ľudia?, CD, OPUS, #91 2214
- 1995: Kam idú ľudia?, CD, Open Music, #91xx 2312
- 1996: Kam idú ľudia?, CD, OPUS, #91 25xx
- 2004: Kam idú ľudia?: Komplet 8, 4 bonus tracks (SP "Mami, mami" and "Tváre pred zrkadlom", CD, OPUS, #91 2214

== Credits and personnel ==
- Marika Gombitová - lead vocal, music
- Andrej Šeban - music, keyboards, guitars, drums programming, arranger
- Kamil Peteraj - lyrics
- Norbert Bóka - synthetizers programming
- Emil Frátrik Jr - cymbals
- Stanislav Beňačka - chorus
- Adriena Bartošová - chorus
- Elena Matúšová - chorus
- Jana Küthreibová - chorus
- Peter Smolinský - producer
- Ivan Jombík - soud director
- Michal Ivanický - technical collaboration
- Štefan Danko - responsible editor
- Anton Sládek - photography
- Gabo Dušík - writer (bonus track 14)
