= Modrý album =

Studio album by Miroslav Žbirka
- Released: 2001
- Genre: Pop
- Length: 53:30
- Label: Universal (#013 754)
- Producer: Aleš Zenkl; Honza Horáček; Miroslav Žbirka

Miroslav Žbirka chronology
Neberte nám princeznú (2001)	Modrý album (2001)	The Best of 93–03 (2003)

Modrý album (Blue Album) is the twelfth studio album by Slovak singer Miroslav Žbirka, released on Universal Music in 2001.

== Track listing ==
All tracks are written by Žbirka.

No.	Title	Featured artist(s)	Length
1.	"Jediná"		3:10
2.	"Je mi fajn"		4:05
3.	"Kvôli tebe"		3:35
4.	"Mayday"		3:15
5.	"Vstávaj"		4:12
6.	"Bezchybná"		3:15
7.	"Len zatvor oči"		4:12
8.	"Myslím, že ti rozumiem"		3:13
9.	"Mám rád"		2:59
10.	"Nad ránom"		3:17
11.	"Nespáľme to krásne v nás"	Marika Gombitová	3:20
12.	"Miliónkrát"		4:42
13.	"Nesplnený sen"		3:28
14.	"Co bolí to přebolí"	Martha (Uncredited)	3:23
15.	"Na klzisku"		4:02
Total length:			53:30

Modrý album (Bonus Tracks)
No.	Title	Featured artist	Length
16.	"V slepých uličkách"	Gombitová	4:02
17.	"Biely kvet"		3:28
18.	"Atlantída"		3:40
19.	"22 dní"		2:48
20.	"Zlodejka snov II"		4:35
21.	"Mám čierny deň"		2:31
Total length:			74:34

== Official releases ==
- 2001: Modrý album, CD, Universal Music, No. 013 754
- 2001: Modrý album, CD, bonus tracks, Universal Music, No. 013 754
- 2010: Zlatá edice: Modrý album, CD, Universal Music, #013 754

== Credits and personnel ==
- Miroslav Žbirka – lead vocal, writer, acoustic guitar, co-producer
- Marika Gombitová – lead vocal
- Martha – lead vocal
- Aleš Zenkl – producer
- Honza Horáček – producer
- Andrej Lažo – engineer, mastered-by
- Milan Cimfe – engineer, mastered-by

== Charts ==
=== Weekly charts ===
Chart (2002)	Peak position
Czech Albums Chart	11
Chart (2012)	Peak position
Czech Albums Chart	19

=== Year-end charts ===
Chart (2007)	Peak position
The 100 Greatest Slovak Albums of All Time	86
