= Emma Drobná =

Slovak singer

- Born: Emma Drobná; 24 March 1994 (age 32)
- Origin: Nové Mesto nad Váhom, Slovakia
- Occupation: Singer
- Years active: 2015–present
- Labels: Warner, Monitor

Emma Drobná (born 24 March 1994) is a Slovak singer and the winner of Česko Slovenská SuperStar 2015. She sings mainly in English, although some of her tracks are with Slovak lyrics. In 2016, Drobná took part in the TV series Tvoja tvár znie povedome, although she did not reach the final. In 2017 she competed alongside Filip Buránsky in the sixth series of Slovak TV series Let's Dance. Drobná signed a sponsorship deal with Coca-Cola in 2018.

== Discography ==
=== Studio albums ===
- 2016: Emma Drobná
- 2017: You Should Know
- 2020: Better Like This
- 2025: Emminencia
