= Jozef Ráž =

Slovak musician (born 1954)

Jožo Ráž
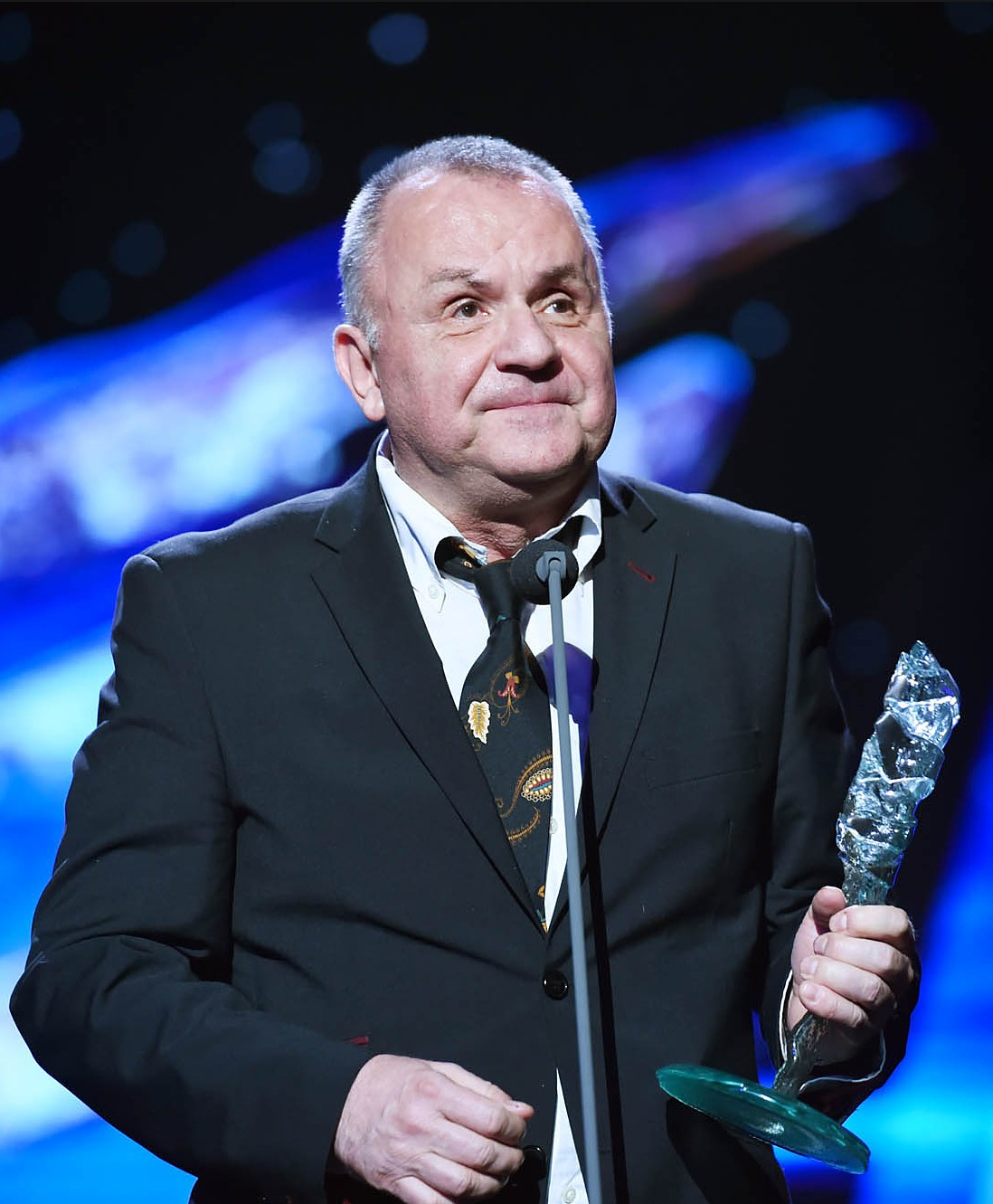
- Ráž in 2015

Background information
- Born: Jozef Ráž; 24 October 1954 (age 71); Bratislava, Czechoslovakia
- Genres: Rock; pop
- Occupation: Musician
- Instruments: Vocals; bass
- Years active: 1969–present
- Labels: Opus; BMG Ariola
- Member of: Elán
- Website: elan.cz

Jozef "Jožo" Ráž (born 24 October 1954) is a Slovak singer–songwriter and bassist from Bratislava known mainly for his work with the group Elán.

== Career ==
Jožo Ráž founded the pop-rock band Elán in 1968 together with his school classmates Vašo Patejdl, Juraj Farkaš, and Zdeno Baláž. He is also an occasional actor: in 1989, he played himself in the fictionalized film about the band Elán, titled Rabaka.

== Personal life ==
Ráž graduated from the Faculty of Arts, Comenius University in Bratislava. While riding his motorcycle in Bratislava's city center in 1999, he was hit by a car, causing him a serious head injury as well as a broken nose, wrist, and right leg.

Ráž has expressed controversial views in the past, such as in 2012, when he stated "I am not a racist, but I am afraid of the Chinese—there are many of them". He has also voiced his support for authoritative leaders such as Gustáv Husák, Vladimír Mečiar, Robert Fico, Fidel Castro, and Vladimir Putin.

Ráž's son, also named Jozef, was nominated for the position of Slovak Minister of the Interior in March 2018 for the Direction – Social Democracy party, but President Andrej Kiska refused his appointment.

== See also ==
- OST Fontána pre Zuzanu 2
- The 100 Greatest Slovak Albums of All Time
