= Zostaň =

Solo album by Marika Gombitová

Studio album by Marika Gombitová
- Released: 1994
- Recorded: 1994
- Genre: Pop rock
- Length: 46:57
- Label: Jumbo (#0025 2311)
- Producer: Václav Patejdl

Marika Gombitová chronology
Polnočné otázky: 16 Naj 1984–1993 (1993)	Zostaň (1994)	The Best of 1977–1988: Vol 1 (1995)

Singles from Zostaň
- 1. "Peklo milencov"/"Paradiso"

Zostaň (English: Stay) is the ninth solo album by Marika Gombitová released on Jumbo Records in 1994.

== Track listing ==
All tracks are written by Gombitová and Peteraj, unless stated otherwise.

No.	Title	Writer(s)	Length
1.	"Paradiso"		4:18
2.	"Peklo milencov"		3:53
3.	"Čo s láskou"		3:49
4.	"Zostaň"		3:46
5.	"Buď nad tým"		3:41
6.	"Sťahovanie duší"		3:48
7.	"Skús to znova"		3:40
8.	"Finále"	Dušík; Peteraj	2:56
9.	"Mama, kde si?"	Patejdl; Peteraj	5:05
10.	"Zabudnuté sa vráti"		3:47
11.	"Deň zatmenia slnka a hviezd"		4:02
12.	"Končí sa show"		4:12
Total length:			46:57

== Official releases ==
- 1994: Zostaň, CD, MC, Jumbo Records, #0025 2311
- 2006: Zostaň, bonus material ("Paradiso" video + slideshow), CD, Jumbo Records, #0025 2311

== Credits and personnel ==
- Marika Gombitová – lead vocal, music
- Václav Patejdl – music, arranger, programming, keyboards, chorus
- Štefan Hegeds – arranger, programming, keyboards
- Henry Tóth – guitars
- Jana Ktreiberová – chorus
- Elena Matušová – chorus
- Marcel Palonder – chorus
- Jozef Krajčovič – sound director, technical coordination, mix
- Relax – studio

== Re-release ==
Zostaň 2006

Studio album by Marika Gombitová
- Released: 2006
- Recorded: 1994, 2006
- Genre: Pop rock
- Length: 46:56
- Label: Jumbo (#0025 2311)
- Producer: Václav Patejdl

Marika Gombitová chronology
Dúhy (2005)	Zostaň 2006 (2006)	Vyznanie (2007)

=== Track listing ===
All tracks are written by Gombitová and Peteraj, unless stated otherwise.

No.	Title	Writer(s)	Length
1.	"Čo s láskou"		3:49
2.	"Finále"	Dušík; Peteraj	2:56
3.	"Sťahovanie duší"		3:48
4.	"Zostaň (2006)"		3:45
5.	"Buď nad tým"		3:41
6.	"Skús to znova"		3:40
7.	"Mama, kde si?"	Patejdl; Peteraj	5:05
8.	"Peklo milencov"		3:53
9.	"Deň zatmenia slnka a hviezd"		4:02
10.	"Zabudnuté sa vráti"		3:47
11.	"Paradiso"		4:18
12.	"Končí sa show"		4:12
Total length:			46:56

Bonus material
No.	Title	Length
13.	"Paradiso (video)"	4:18
14.	"Slideshow"
15.	"Lyrics"
Total length:		51:14

Additional credits and personnel

- Václav Patejdl – arranger (track 4)
