= Doktor Sen =

Studio album by Miroslav Žbirka
- Released: 1980
- Genre: Pop
- Length: 41:59
- Label: OPUS (#9116 1000)
- Producer: Ján Lauko; Štefan Danko

Miroslav Žbirka chronology
Doktor Sen (1980)	Sezónne lásky (1982)

Singles from Doktor Sen
- 1. "Klaun z domu č. 6"

Doktor Sen ('Doctor Dream') is the debut album by Slovak singer Miroslav Žbirka, released on OPUS in 1980.

== Track listing ==
All tracks are written by Žbirka and Peteraj.

No.	Title	Length
1.	"Klaun z domu číslo 6"	3:38
2.	"Doktor sen"	3:59
3.	"V slepých uličkách" (duet with Marika Gombitová)	4:08
4.	"Mám čierny deň"	3:02
5.	"Bežec na šachovnici"	2:35
6.	"Starý muž z osamelého domu"	4:14
7.	"Modrá kniha lásky"	4:09
8.	"Ako obrázok"	3:17
9.	"Zázračný dáždnik"	3:45
10.	"Aréna"	3:01
11.	"Sedem divov tvojich líc"	2:57
12.	"Balada o poľných vtákoch"	3:14
Total length:		41:59

== Official releases ==
- 1980: Doktor Sen, LP, MC, OPUS, #9116 100
- 1999: Doktor Sen, CD, Bonton, No. 49 2930
- 2008: Slovenské legendárne albumy II: Doktor Sen, CD, SME, #91 0017
- 2008: Doktor Sen: 2CD Collectors Edition, bonus CD, OPUS, #91 2716

== Credits and personnel ==
- Miroslav Žbirka – lead vocal, writer, acoustic guitar
- Marika Gombitová – lead vocal, back vocal
- Ladislav Lučenič – bass, guitar, percussion, back vocal
- Dušan Hájek – drums, percussion
- Jozef Hanák – harmonica, sound engineer
- Ján Lehotský – keyboards, back vocal
- Štefan Danko – executive producer
- Ján Lauko – record producer
- Karel Witz – guitar
- Martin Karvaš – synthesizer
- Kamil Peteraj – lyrics
- Július Kinček – liner notes
- Tibor Borský – art work

== Accolades ==
In 2007, Doktor Sen ranked 19th on the list of the 100 Greatest Slovak Albums of All Time.

== Export release ==
Doctor Dream (aka Miro and/or Like a Hero)

Studio album by Miroslav Žbirka
- Released: 1981
- Genre: Pop
- Length: 41:59
- Label: OPUS (#9113 1148); RCA Victor (#PL 28487); Dureco Benelux (#88 038)
- Producer: Ján Lauko; Štefan Danko

Miroslav Žbirka chronology
Doctor Dream (aka Miro and/or Like a Hero) (1981)	Light of My Life (1982)

Singles from Doctor Dream
- 1. "The Love Song"

The initial export version of the album, entitled Doctor Dream, was issued in 1981 on OPUS Records. Like a Hero, an edited version excluding one track, was released in 1982 on RCA Victor in Germany. While a similar, also 11 track release named just Miro, was issued in the Netherlands on Dureco Benelux.

=== Track listing ===
All tracks are written by Miroslav Žbirka and Kamil Peteraj.

No.	Title	Length
1.	"Mama"	3:38
2.	"I'm Gonna Make My Wife"	3:59
3.	"The Love Song"	4:08
4.	"My Darling"	3:02
5.	"Nightmare"	2:35
6.	"Flight 28"	4:14
7.	"Games of Life"	4:09
8.	"Gotta Make It Right"	3:17
9.	"Till I'm Around"	3:45
10.	"I'm a Stranger in My Own Town"	3:01
11.	"In the Middle of the Shave"	2:57
12.	"Hero"	3:14
Total length:		41:59

=== Official releases ===
- 1981: Doctor Dream, LP, MC, OPUS, #9113 1148
- 1982: Like a Hero, LP, MC, RCA Victor, #PL 28487
- 1982: Miro, LP, MC, Dureco Benelux, No. 88 038
