= Team (Slovak band) =

Slovak rock band

- Also known as: Pavol Habera a Team; Habera & TEAM
- Origin: Martin, Slovakia
- Genres: Rock; pop rock
- Years active: 1980–present
- Labels: Opus; Tommü Records; ENA Production; Forza; Universal Music
- Members: Pavol Habera; Dušan Antalík; Ivan Válek; Juraj Tatár; Marcel Buntaj
- Past members: Ivan Marček; Milan Dočekal; Erich Siegel; Bohuš Kantor; Roman Révai; Ďuso Petrus; Emil Fratik
- Website: team-online.sk

Team, sometimes stylized as TEAM, is a Slovak rock band led by Pavol Habera. It was founded in 1980 in the city of Martin, in what was then Czechoslovakia. The band won the Zlatý slavík music award in 1989, 1990, and again in 1991, as well as a ZAI Award in 1990. They have released ten studio albums, three live recordings, and several compilations.

== History ==
=== Beginnings ===
Team was founded by guitarist Dušan Antalík, vocalist and keyboard player Milan Dočekal, bassist Ivan Válek, and drummer Ivan Marček in 1980 in the Slovak city of Martin, then part of Czechoslovakia. Between 1982 and 1984, the group was inactive, as its members had to perform compulsory military service. They got back together in 1985 and recorded their first single, "Beh". In 1986, they were joined by second keyboardist Bohuš Kantor. They recorded another single, "Na jednej lodi", and began preparing their debut album.

=== Early albums ===
In 1988, vocalist Pavol Habera joined Team. Most of the material for the band's debut record had already been prepared, and Habera contributed the songs "Máš moje číslo" and "List od Vincenta", which he originally recorded with his previous band Avion. The album was a success, especially the track "Reklama na ticho". Team decided to record it again in Esperanto, with the help of new manager Stano Marček.

Their second album, Team 2 – Prichytený pri živote, saw Erich Siegel replace Marček on drums. The record was carried by the singles "Prievan v peňaženke" and "Lietam v tom tiež". The band's next album, Team 3, released in 1990, spawned the hit "Držím ti miesto". Team moved from Opus Records to Tommü Records, and Habera launched a solo career.

=== Team 4, 5, 6 ===
Ivan Marček returned to play on Team's fourth album, Team 4, which came out in 1991. It was followed in 1993 by Team 5, and in 1996, Team 6 – Voľná zóna came out. The album was made in the absence of Habera, Dočekal, and Marček, with Roman Révai singing and Ďuso Petrus playing drums. It was also the last record with Bohuš Kantor.

=== Habera's return–present ===
In 1997, Habera returned to Team. The band's next album, Team 7 – 7edem, was released in 2000 and included the hit "Krátke lásky". A new keyboard player, Juraj Tatár, was added to the group. Marček returned again on drums for the band's next album, Team 8 – Mám na teba chuť :-), which came out in 2002. A year later, Team recorded the concert album Team 9 – Live in Praha and followed it with the studio releases Team X and Team 11, in 2004 and 2007, respectively.

In December 2011, the band announced a farewell tour for 2012. Habera stated: "After almost 30 years since the establishment of Team, we want to close one extraordinary and successful chapter of our musical lives, and the best way is to play for our fans".

In May 2014, longtime drummer Ivan Marček died; he was replaced by Marcel Buntaj. As of 2026, the band continues to tour as Habera & Team.

== In popular culture ==
The song "Držím ti miesto", from TEAM's 1990 album, Team 3, was included on the soundtrack of the 2005 American film Hostel.

== Band members ==
Current

- Pavol Habera – vocals, guitar
- Dušan Antalík – guitar, vocals
- Ivan Válek – bass
- Juraj Tatár – keyboards
- Marcel Buntaj – drums

Past

- Ivan Marček – drums
- Milan Dočekal – keyboards, vocals
- Erich Siegel – drums
- Bohuš Kantor – keyboards
- Roman Révai – vocals
- Ďuso Petrus – drums
- Emil Fratik – drums

== Discography ==
Studio albums

- Team 1 (1988)
- Ora Team (also Team en Esperanto) (1989)
- Team 2 – Prichytený pri živote (1989)
- Team 3 (1990)
- Team 4 (1991)
- Team 5 (1993)
- Team 6 – Voľná zóna (1996)
- Team 7 – 7edem (2000)
- Team 8 – Mám na teba chuť :-) (2002)
- Team X (2004)
- Team 11 (2007)

Live albums

- Team 9 – Live in Praha (2003)
- Best of Tour Live (20 Rokov Skupiny Team) (2008)
- Best of "Live" (2024)

Compilations

- Team – Hity (1994)
- Best of Team (1997)
- Zlaté hity (2000)
- Pavol Habera & Team Best Of – Piesne o láske (2002)
- Best of 1988–2005 (2005)
- Gold (2006)
- Pavol Habera & Team – Největší Hity (2007)
- Best of Tour 2008 Výber (20 Rokov Skupiny Team) (2008)
- Team / Prichytený pri živote (2009)
- Od A po Zet (2016)

== Awards ==
- 1989 Zlatý slavík for Best Group
- 1990 Zlatý slavík for Best Group
- 1990 ZAI Awards for Best Vocal Artist or Ensemble
- 1991 Zlatý slavík for Best Group

== See also ==
The 100 Greatest Slovak Albums of All Time
