= Babylónia =

- A screenshot of the official music video

Song by Marika Gombitová

from the album Kam idú ľudia?
- Language: Slovak
- Released: 1990
- Genre: Pop rock
- Length: 5:15
- Label: OPUS
- Songwriters: Marika Gombitová; Kamil Peteraj
- Producer: Peter Smolinský

Music video
- "Babylónia" on YouTube

Audio sample
- file; help

"Babylónia" (Babel) is a song by Marika Gombitová released on OPUS in 1990.

The music composed Gombitová, while Kamil Peteraj contributed with lyrics as usually. Following the track being issued as the pilot song taken from the singer's ninth studio album Kam idú ľudia?, its music video presented the artist on the Austrian chart Die Großen Zehn by ORF, becoming the first such case for any Czechoslovak entertainer by June 20, 1990.

== Official versions ==
1. "Babylónia" – Studio version, 1990

== Credits and personnel ==
- Marika Gombitová – lead vocal, music
- Andrej Šeban – keyboards, guitars, drums programming, arranger
- Kamil Peteraj – lyrics
- Norbert Bóka – synthetizers programming
- Stanislav Beňačka – chorus
- Adriena Bartošová – chorus
- Elena Matúšová – chorus
- Jana Küthreibová – chorus
- Peter Smolinský – producer
- Ivan Jombík – soud director
- Michal Ivanický – technical collaboration
- Štefan Danko – responsible editor
