= Nenápadná =

Single by Marika Gombitová

from the album Ateliér duše (Bonus tracks)
- B-side: "Mami, mami"
- Released: 1986
- Recorded: 1986
- Genre: Pop
- Length: 4:03
- Label: OPUS (#9143 0664)
- Songwriters: Marika Gombitová; Kamil Peteraj

Marika Gombitová singles chronology
"Záhradná kaviareň" (1983)	"Nenápadná" (1986)	"Tváre pred zrkadlom" (1989)

Audio sample
- "Nenápadná": file; help

"Nenápadná" (Inconspicuous) is a song by Marika Gombitová, released by OPUS in 1986.

The composition, written by Gombitová with Kamil Peteraj, was released with "Mami, mami" on the B-side. For the first time on CD, both songs were attached to the 96's re-release of the singer's album Ateliér duše as bonus tracks.

== Official versions ==
1. "Nenápadná" – Studio version, 1983

== Credits and personnel ==
- Marika Gombitová – music, lead vocal
- Kamil Peteraj – lyrics
- OPUS – copyright

== Charts ==
=== Weekly charts ===
Chart (1988)	Peak position
Slovak EP/Singles Chart	3^{[A]}

=== Year-end charts ===
Chart (1987)	Peak position
Slovak EP/Singles Chart	4^{[B]}

Notes

- A The October chart topped "Smrtka na pražskom Orloji" by Elán, followed by "Pigi čaj" by Zenit. In November, Gombitová's single charted also at number No. 3, behind "Keď ťa nechá dievča" by Zenit, respectively Elán's "Smrtka na pražskom Orloji" by Elán.
- B The Top 5 of the Slovak Year End Chart topped in 1987 "Že mi je ľúto" by Elán & Lojzo, followed by Peter Nagy's "Poďme sa zachrániť" (#2) and "Zaľúbení" by Dušan Hlaváček. The fourth was Gombitová, while at No. 5 "Smrtka na pražskom Orloji" by Elán.
