= Ibrahim Maiga =

Slovak singer, actor, and politician (born 1963)

- Born: 3 January 1963 (age 63); Mopti, Mali
- Other name: Ibi Maiga
- Occupations: Singer; actor; comedian; politician

Ibrahim Maiga, also known as Ibi Maiga, (born in Mopti, 3 January 1963), is a Slovak singer, actor, comedian, and politician. The BBC describes him as a "celebrity in Slovakia".

== Biography ==
Maiga moved to what was then Czechoslovakia in the late 1980s as a student at the Slovak University of Technology in Bratislava and subsequently obtained Slovak citizenship. He "quickly became famous as a singer and actor". The BBC describes him as "a well-known figure" through his "infectious humour and songs about his homeland, Mali".

He stood as a candidate for the European Parliament during the 2009 elections, representing the Party of the Democratic Left (SDL). As a pro-European, he has stated: "Particularly now, in a time of crisis, we see how important the European Union is. Without its existence, several states might have suffered collapse". Explaining his choice to run for the European Parliament, he also stated: "I really want to fight this election just to show Europe that Slovakia has a great future in Europe. If I'm elected and for the first time in history a black man represents Slovakia, that's going to be obvious to all of Europe."

In 2019, Maiga announced his return to politics and ran for a seat in the 2019 European Parliament election in Slovakia as a representative of the Priama Demokracia party.

Maiga speaks six languages. He has two children, a son and a daughter.

== See also ==
- OST Fontána pre Zuzanu 2
- The 100 Greatest Slovak Albums of All Time
