= Fontána pre Zuzanu 2 =

Soundtrack album
- Released: June 1993
- Genre: pop, rock, dance
- Length: 55:44
- Label: Tommü Records
- Producer: Vašo Patejdl

Fontána pre Zuzanu 2 (Fountain for Suzanne 2) is the soundtrack album to the self-titled movie by Dušan Rapoš, released on Tommü Records in 1993.

The music for the compilation was written by Pavol Habera along with record producer Vašo Patejdl. Apart from Habera, other artists such as Szidi Tobias and Jožo Ráž provided solo tracks. Tobias on "Chlap z kríža", while also on a duet entitled "Pomník šibnutým", and Ráž on "Teraz alebo nikdy". From the Czech Republic, Lucie Bílá appears ("Láska šialená").

== Track listing ==
All lyrics are written by Boris Filan

| No. | Title | Music | Featured artist(s) | Length |
|---|---|---|---|---|
| 1. | "Niekto ma musí mať rád" | Pavol Habera | Pavol Habera | 4:10 |
| 2. | "Mama Kami" | Vašo Patejdl | Pavol Habera & Ibrahim Maiga | 3:42 |
| 3. | "Posledná jazda" | Vašo Patejdl | Pavol Habera | 4:52 |
| 4. | "Boh vie" | Pavol Habera | Pavol Habera & Ibrahim Maiga | 4:53 |
| 5. | "To sa na mňa podobá" | Vašo Patejdl | Pavol Habera | 4:08 |
| 6. | "Lovesong" | Pavol Habera | Pavol Habera | 3:58 |
| 7. | "Láska šialená" | Vašo Patejdl | Pavol Habera & Lucie Bílá | 3:49 |
| 8. | "Chlap z kríža" | Pavol Habera | Szidi Tobias | 5:05 |
| 9. | "Sťahovaví ftáci" | Vašo Patejdl | Pavol Habera | 3:26 |
| 10. | "Pomník šibnutým" | Vašo Patejdl | Pavol Habera & Szidi Tobias | 4:10 |
| 11. | "Teraz alebo nikdy" | Vašo Patejdl | Jožo Ráž | 4:30 |
| 12. | "Odkiaľ a kam" | Pavol Habera | Pavol Habera | 5:41 |
| 13. | "Niekto ma musí mať rád (Radio Mix)" | Pavol Habera | Pavol Habera | 3:20 |
| Total length: | | | | 55:44 |

Notes

- All songs performed in Slovak.

== Credits and personnel ==
- Vašo Patejdl - music, producer
- Pavol Habera - music, lead vocal
- Boris Filan - lyrics
- Ibrahim Maiga - lead vocal
- Lucie Bílá - lead vocal
- Szidi Tobias - lead vocal
- Jožo Ráž - lead vocal

== Sales ==
In 1999, the album was re-released in the Czech Republic as part of "The Most Selling Albums" edition.
