= Tváre pred zrkadlom =

Single by Marika Gombitová
- B-side: "Ave Mária"
- Released: 1989
- Recorded: 1989
- Genre: Dance-pop; disco
- Length: 3:29
- Label: OPUS (#9143 0739)
- Songwriters: Marika Gombitová; Gabo Dušík; Kamil Peteraj
- Producer: Peter Smolinský

Marika Gombitová singles chronology
"Nenápadná" (1986)	"Tváre pred zrkadlom" (1989)	"Paradiso" (1994)

Audio sample
- "Tváre pred zrkadlom": file; help

"Tváre pred zrkadlom" ("Faces in Front of the Mirror") is a song by Slovak singer-songwriter Marika Gombitová, released on OPUS in 1989. The composition wrote Gombitová in collaboration with Kamil Peteraj.

B-side of the single promoted a song called "Ave Mária", composed by Gabo Dušík, for a change. Its live version was featured only on VA compilation Nežná revolúcia (1990), also released by OPUS.

Both tracks were available in common on CD as bonus tracks on a 2004 re-issue of her studio album Kam idú ľudia? (originally from 1990).

== Official releases and formats ==
SK 7" Single, #9143 0739

1. "Tváre pred zrkadlom" (Studio version)
2. "Ave Mária" (Studio version)

SK CD album, No. 91 2214

- "Tváre pred zrkadlom" (Studio version)
- "Ave Mária" (Studio version)

SK Double LP, #9017 2240/41

- "Ave Mária" (Live version)

SK CD album, No. 91 2410

- "Ave Mária" (Studio version)

SK CD album, #None

- "Ave Mária" (Studio version)

== Charts ==
Chart (1990)	Peak position
Slovak Singles Chart	2^{[A]}

Notes

- A On the music charts, B-side "Ave Maria" was more successful, scoring as the second most selling SP in Slovakia (following "Sľúbili sme si lásku" by Ivan Hoffman, while preceding "Pravda víťazí" by Tublatanka).

== Credits and personnel ==
- Marika Gombitová – music, lead vocal
- Gabo Dušík – music (B-side)
- Kamil Peteraj – lyrics
- Peter Smolinský – producer
- OPUS Records – record label, copyright owner, marketing and distributor
