= V slepých uličkách =

1980 duet by Miro Žbirka and Marika Gombitová

- A screenshot of the official music video

Song by Miro Žbirka and Marika Gombitová

from the album Doktor Sen
- Released: 1980
- Recorded: 1980
- Genre: Pop
- Length: 4:04
- Label: OPUS (#9143 0538)
- Songwriters: Miro Žbirka; Kamil Peteraj
- Producer: Ján Lauko

Audio sample
- "V slepých uličkách": file; help

Music video
- "V slepých uličkách" on YouTube

"V slepých uličkách" (English: On Dead-End Streets) is a duet by Miro Žbirka and Marika Gombitová released on OPUS in 1980.

The song, written by Žbirka and Kamil Peteraj was originally issued as B-side of the Žbirka's solo single "Klaun z domu č. 6", taken also from his debut studio album Doktor Sen. An international, however solo version of the composition entitled "The Love Song" featured on the Žbirka's export album Doctor Dream (1981).

In 2007, the duet competed in the Slovak national poll organized by Slovenská televízia, being nominated as Hit storočia (English: Hit of the Century), but lost in favor of Gombitová's solo track "Vyznanie".

== Original text ==
1.:
Ako víno žiari chutí ako v ústach med
Ak ju nosíš v tvári krajšej tváre niet
Je taká zvláštna rozpovie ju kvet
Je taká zvláštna rozpovie ju kvet
Ako dúšok vína ako nápoj omamný
Sladko opojí ma na sto nocí na sto dní
Ak budem šťastná nelám krásne sny
Ak budem šťastný nelám krásne sny

R:
No tak daj mi svoju lásku, na pomoc mi rýchlo leť
No tak požičaj mi nádej, dvakrát ti ju vrátim späť
No tak daj mi svoju lásku, na pomoc mi rýchlo leť
No tak požičaj mi nádej, dvakrát ti ju vrátim späť

2.:
Som ten krásny blázon, čo má rád tvoj strach
Predstavím ti šťastie v slepých uličkách
To krásne šťastie v slepých uličkách
To krásne šťastie v slepých uličkách
Som ten krásny blázon, ktorý kráča v oblakoch
Túžim s tebou lietať aj túlať sa po vlakoch
Predstav mi šťastie, zázrak pre mňa sprav
Predstav mi šťastie, zázrak pre mňa sprav.

== Official versions ==
1. "V slepých uličkách" - original version, duet, 1980
2. "The Love Song" - international version, only solo (by Žbirka), 1981
3. "You Know I Love You (Love Song)" - re-released international version, only solo (by Žbirka), 2008

== Credits and personnel ==
- Miro Žbirka - lead vocal, writer, acoustic guitar
- Marika Gombitová - lead vocal, writer
- Kamil Peteraj - lyrics
- Laco Lučenič - bass, guitar, percussion
- Janko Lehotský - keyboards
- Dušan Hájek - drums, percussion
- Karel Witz - guitar
- Martin Karvaš - synthesizer
- Ján Lauko - producer
- Jozef Hanák - sound director, harmonica
- Štefan Danko - responsible editor

== Awards ==
=== Hit storočia ===
The Hit storočia (English: Hit of the Century) was a national TV competition organized by Slovenská televízia. Within its three-month run (beginning April 20, 2007), the viewers voted live the most popular Slovak songs from the 1930s to 1990s. Overall, nine songs were picked to compete in the Finale evening (July 6, 2007). Gombitová entered the show overall with three songs, however winning with a song written by Janko Lehotský and Kamil Peteraj, "Vyznanie" from 1979.

Year	Nominated work	Category	Result
2007	"V slepých uličkách"	Hit of the Century	Nominated

=== Villach Music Festival ===
A solo version of the composition performed by Žbirka himself at a music festival in Villach, Austria in 1982 won the main award. Simultaneously, he also received an award from Ö3 radio station broadcast by ORF.

Year	Nominated work	Category	Result
1982	"The Love Song"	Villach Music Festival	Won
1982	"The Love Song"	Ö3 Award	Won

== You Know I Love You (Love Song) ==
"You Know I Love You (Love Song)"

Song by Miro Žbirka

from the album Like a Hero: The Best of Miro (Remixed 2008)
- Language: English
- Released: 2008
- Genre: Pop music
- Length: 3:43
- Label: Universal
- Songwriters: Miro Žbirka; Kamil Peteraj

Audio sample
- "You Know I Love You (Love Song)": file; help

A new international version of the song, entitled "You Know I Love You (Love Song)", Miro Žbirka recorded for his remixed greatest hits set Like a Hero: The Best of Miro (Remixed 2008), released on Universal Music. Although, with no contribution by Gombitová, the new record appeared also as the second album's track.

== In media ==
In 2005, the American actor/director Eli Roth used the original version of the duet, "V slepých uličkách", in a sequence of his horror film Hostel, co-produced by Quentin Tarantino in 2005. The composition wasn't attached also to the original soundtrack album, however.
