= Pavol Habera =

Slovak musician and actor (born 1962)

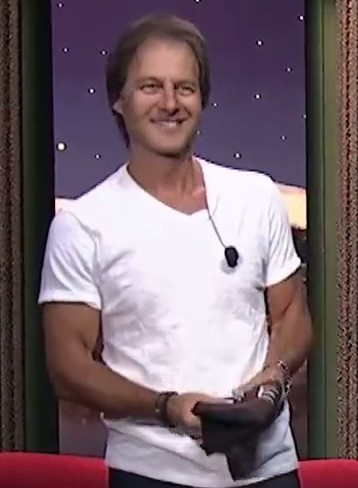
- Habera in 2016

Background information
- Also known as: Paľo Habera
- Born: 12 April 1962 (age 63); Brezno, Czechoslovakia
- Genres: Rock; pop rock
- Occupations: Musician; actor
- Instruments: Guitar; vocals; piano
- Years active: 1982–present
- Labels: Tommü Records; PolyGram; Ebony; Studio; P&H
- Member of: TEAM
- Formerly of: Tristo hrmených; Burčiak; Avion

Pavol Habera (born Pavel Habera in 12 April 1962), better known as Paľo Habera, is a Slovak singer, musician, composer, and musical actor. He gained popularity in the 1980s as the leader of the rock band TEAM and has since been known through his successful solo career, and most recently as a judge on the television shows SuperStar Search Slovakia and SuperStar, based on the British music competition television series Pop Idol.

== Early life ==
Habera studied economics at school but eventually found his specialization in music. Before performing compulsory military service, he sang in the band Tristo hrmených, which also included Andrej Šeban, and later in Burčiak, also with Šeban. After returning from the army, Habera played with the band Avion. In 1988, he joined TEAM, a pop rock band from the city of Martin, whose fame rose with the arrival of their new lead singer. He has remained the group's frontman to this day.

== Career ==
In 1991, Habera won the Zlatý slavík and Anděl music awards. The following year, he launched a successful solo career.

Habera was a judge on the panel of the Slovak music competition television show SuperStar Search Slovakia, based on the British programme Pop Idol. Since 2009, he has been a judge on the show SuperStar, a Czech-Slovak co-production of the same format.

Habera has also written music for other artists, including Karel Gott, for whom he composed the 1992 hit "Když muž se ženou snídá" and the 1993 single "Svet lásku má", which he sang together with Gott and opera singer Peter Dvorský. Apart from his musical activities, Habera has also dabbled in acting. He played the lead role in the 1993 musical film Fontána pre Zuzanu 2, which also starred Malian-Slovak singer and actor Ibrahim Maiga and Czech singer Lucie Bílá.

== Personal life ==
Previously married, Habera met Czech model Daniela Peštová in 2000. They have two children together.

== Discography ==
=== with Team ===
- Team 1 (1988)
- Ora Team (also Team en Esperanto) (1989)
- Team 2 – Prichytený pri živote (1989)
- Team 3 (1990)
- Team 4 (1991)
- Team 5 (1993)
- Team 6 – Voľná zóna (1996)
- Team 7 – 7edem (2000)
- Team 8 – Mám na teba chuť :-) (2002)
- Team X (2004)
- Team 11 (2007)

=== Solo ===
Studio albums

- Pavol Habera (1991)
- Habera 2 (1992)
- Zhasni a svieť (1995)
- Svet lásku má with Peter Dvorský, Karel Gott, and the Slovak Philharmonic, conducted by Ondrej Lenárd (1996)
- Habera '97 (1997)
- Vianočné koncerty with Peter Dvorský (1998)
- Vianočná hviezda with Peter Dvorský (1999)
- Boli sme raz milovaní (2000)
- To sa stáva (2006)

Soundtrack albums

- Fontána pre Zuzanu 2 (1993)

Compilations

- Pavol Habera výber (1995)
- Zlaté Hity (2001)

Singles

- "Chcem to zažiť eště raz" (featuring Ben Cristovao and Viktor Hazard) (2019)
- "Láska a smrť" (2020)

=== Others ===
- Stala Sa Nám Láska... with Burčiak (1989)
