= Elán (band) =

Slovak pop rock band

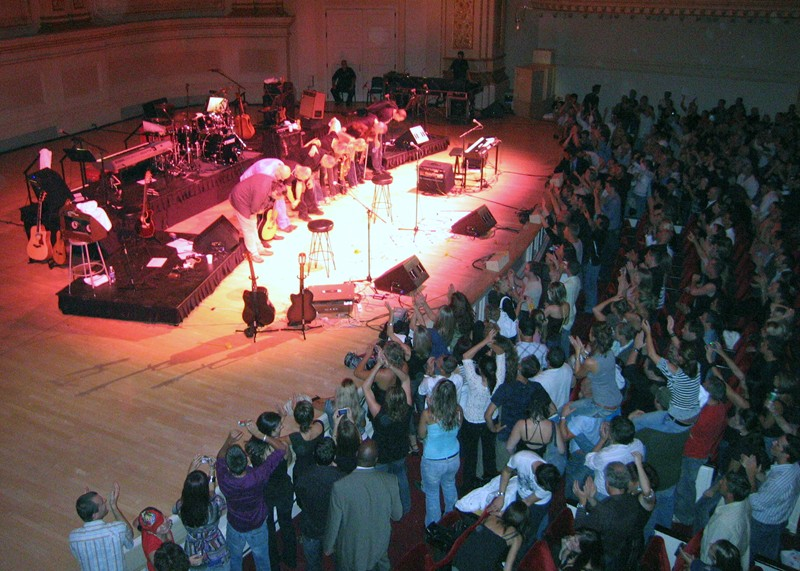
- Elán performing in 2007

Background information
- Origin: Bratislava, Czechoslovakia
- Genres: Pop rock; rock
- Years active: 1968–present
- Members: Jožo Ráž; Ján Baláž; Peter Farnbauer; Ľubo Horňák; Štefan Bugala
- Past members: See Past members
- Website: elan.sk/sk

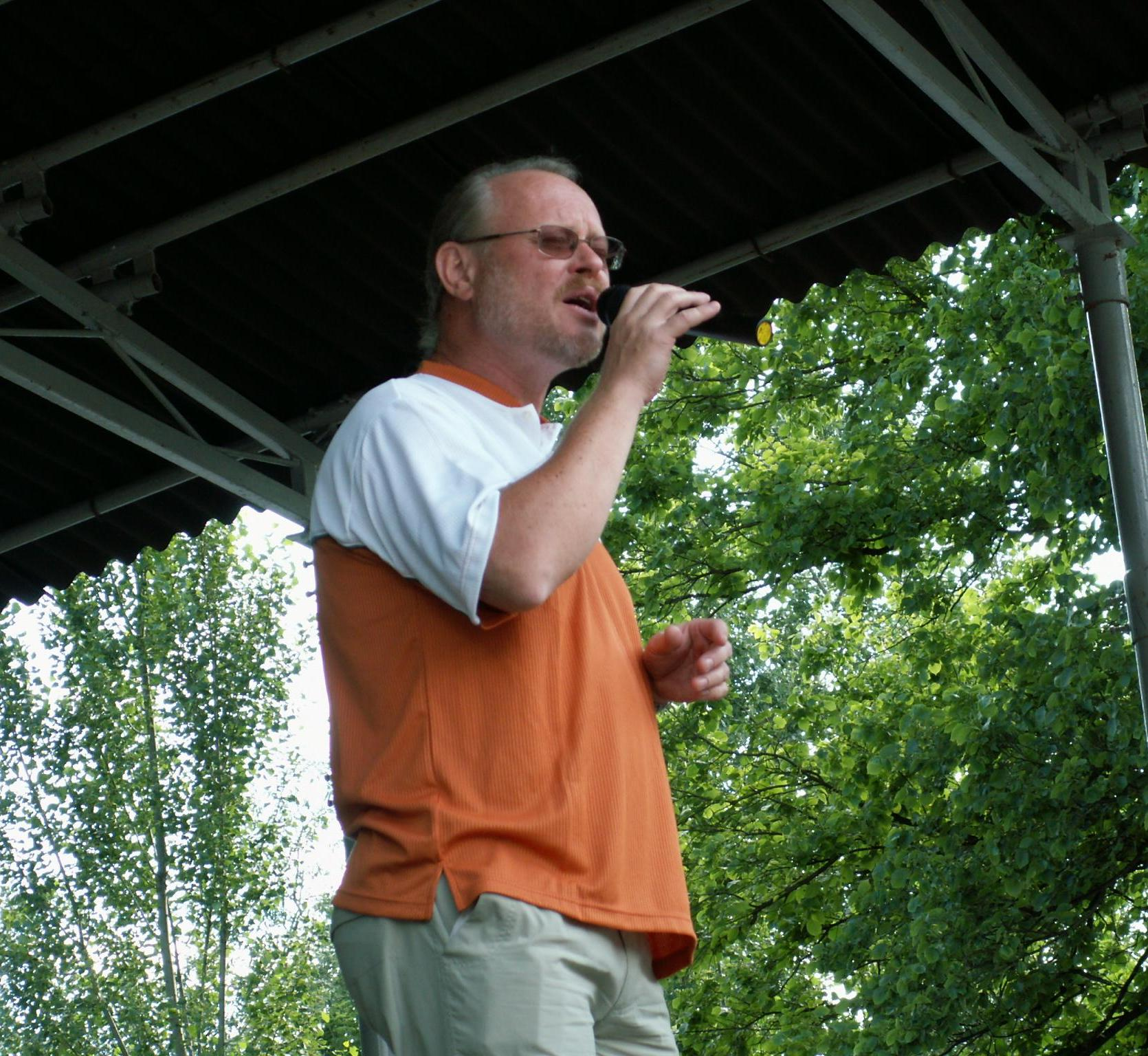
Vašo Patejdl, 2007

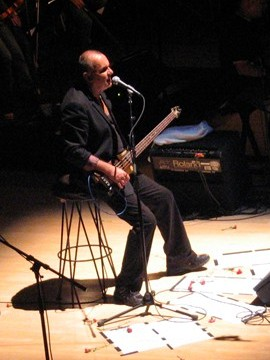
Jožo Ráž, 2007

Elán is a Slovak pop rock band founded in 1968 by elementary school classmates Jožo Ráž, Vašo Patejdl, Juraj Farkaš, and Zdeno Baláž. They became one of the most popular Czechoslovak bands during the 1980s, releasing ten successful albums between 1981 and 1991. In 1993, the group represented Slovakia in the preliminary round of the Eurovision Song Contest but having finished in fourth place, failed to qualify for the finals in Ireland. Elán performed at the FIS Nordic World Ski Championships 2009 in Liberec, Czech Republic, as part of the championship's entertainment festivities. The band has toured internationally throughout their career. They have produced many well-known hits and won several awards, such as the Slávik Awards, Slávik, and Zlatý slavík, which they won four years in a row.

== History ==
Elán began by playing in high-school and university clubs in Bratislava, and later got the opportunity to play overseas, in such places as Tunisia, Bulgaria, and Sweden. Their first original compositions were the songs "Semafór", "Dám ti všetko čo mám", "Ponúkam", and "Bláznivé hry", with which the band performed at the Bratislavská lýra festival in 1979, and which won Patejdl the award for best arrangement.

The group became known to the general public in 1980 after winning the silver prize with the song "Kaskadér" at Bratislavská lýra. During the 1980s, Elán gained in popularity with their original Slovak songs. A significant change in the band's direction was the arrival of Ján Baláž, previously with Modus, in 1981. Their debut album, Ôsmy svetadiel, was released the same year. It was followed by Nie sme zlí in 1982, Elán 3 in 1983, and Hodina slovenčiny in 1985.

In the second half of the 1980s, Zdeno Baláž, Vašo Patejdl, and Juraj Farkaš left the group. Ján Baláž, together with Jožo Ráž, completed the group's lineup with drummer Gabriel Szabó and keyboardist Martin Karvaš. The personnel change also heralded a new phase in the band's career. They released the album Detektívka in 1986, followed by Nebezpečný náklad in 1988 and Rabaka in 1989. Rabaka was accompanied by an eponymous film, which included production work by Boris Filan and Dušan Rapoš. At the end of 1989, Martin Karvaš and Gabo Szabó left the group.

At the start of the 1990s, the group's lineup consisted of Jožo Ráž, Ján Baláž, Peter Farnbauer, Ľubomír Horňák, and Juraj Kuchárek. They recorded the album Netvor z čiernej hviezdy Q7A and released it in 1991. The following year, the band issued a greatest hits compilation titled Legendy 1. The album Hodina angličtiny came out in 1994. In 1996, Patejdl returned to Elán and the band announced the recording of a new album, which was released under the title Hodina pravdy in 1997. Two more commercially successful albums were subsequently released, Elán 3000 (2002) and Tretie oko (2003). Elán went on an extended hiatus in the mid-2000s, returning in 2010 with the album Anjelska daň. In 2014, they signed a record deal with Warner Music and released the album Živých nás nedostanú. The band's fifteenth album, and to date latest, was released in 2019, and titled Najvyšší čas.

Vašo Patejdl died of an undisclosed illness on 19 August 2023.

In 2026, Elán announced on their official website that they would be going on an extended hiatus following a series of concerts that year.

== Band members ==
=== Current members ===
- Jožo Ráž – lead vocals, bass (1968–present)
- Jano Baláž – guitars, lead vocals (1981–present)
- Peter Farnbauer – guitars, keyboards, saxophone, vocals (1990–present)
- Ľubo Horňák – keyboards, vocals (1991–present)
- Štefan Bugala – drums (2016–present)

==== Horn section ====
- Richard Šimurka – saxophone, flute (2014–present)
- Martin Haas – trombone (2014–present)
- Samuel Šimek – trumpet (2014–present)

=== Past members ===
- Juraj Farkaš – guitars, vocals (1968–1985), lead vocals on "Belasý let" (1981)
- Zdeno Baláž – drums (1968–1985)
- Juraj Fábry – keyboards, vocals (1968–1969)
- Vašo Patejdl – guitars (1968–1969), keyboards (1969–1985, 1996–2023), lead vocals (1968–1985, 1996–2023)
- Pavol Šikula – saxophone, clarinet (1972–1974)
- Štefan Horný – trumpet (1972–1973)
- Hana Horská – percussion, lead vocals (1972)
- Peter Kollárik – trumpet (1973–1975)
- František Poul – trombone, flute (1973–1974)
- Boris Kopčák – trombone, vocals, violin (1974–1978)
- Fero Turák – trumpet, vocals, violin (1975–1978)
- Jozef Tekel – saxophone, flute, vocals, violin (1975–1979)
- Júlia Feketeová – percussion, flute, vocals (1975)
- Dalibor Moyzes – percussion (1977–1979)
- Peter Šišma – trumpet (1977–1978)
- Marián Broušek – trombone (1977–1978)
- Milan Jendruch – saxophone, clarinet, percussion (1977–1979)
- Pavol Duga – trumpet (1977–1978)
- Martin Karvaš – keyboards, vocals (1985–1989)
- Gabo Szabó – drums (1985–1989)
- Vladimír Jánoš – guitar (1990–1991)
- Juraj Kuchárek – drums (1991–2002, 2004–2007)
- Henry Tóth – guitars (2003–2014)
- Marcel Buntaj – drums (2003)
- Boris Brna – drums (2008–2016)

=== Guest studio musicians ===
- Piešťanská folková skupina Slniečko – vocals on "Mláďatá" and "Belasý let" (1981)
- Viera Briestenská – vocals on "Nie sme zlí" (1982)
- Ladislav Briestenský – vocals on "Nie sme zlí" (1982)
- Ľubomír Stankovský – drums (1985)
- Vašo Patejdl – synths, vocals (1986)
- Štefan Nosáľ – fujara, vocals on "Tanečnice z Lúčnice" (1986)
- Anton Jaro – fretless guitar on "Neobzerajte sa pani Lótová" (1986), bass (1988, 1989)
- J. Ťapák – vocals on "Tanečnice z Lúčnice" (1986)
- P. Holík – vocals on "Tanečnice z Lúčnice" (1986)
- M. Hesek – vocals on "Tanečnice z Lúčnice" (1986)
- Dušan Huščava – tenor saxophone (1986, 1988)
- J. Fabrický – drums (1988)
- Marián Kochanský – vocals (1988)
- Eva Balážová – cimbalom on "Od Tatier k Dunaju" (1989)
- Roman Grešák – vocals on "Hostia z inej planéty" (1991)
- Jaroslav Dudík – violin on "Hostia z inej planéty" (1991)
- Peter Abrahám – violin, strings (1997)
- Pavol Jursa – vocals (1997, 2019)
- Juraj Burian – acoustic guitar on "O láske" (2002)
- Erik Boboš Procházka – harmonica on "Nežný a plný energie" (2010)
- Lenka Lo Hrůzová – lead vocals on "Neodchádzaj" (2014)
- András Madarász – harmonica on "Sto životov" (2019)

=== Guest live musicians ===
- Fero Turák – keyboards, vocals (1978–1980, 1990–1991)
- Viktor Hidvéghy – bass (1990–1991, 1998), organ (1998)
- Július Petrus – drums (1990–1991)
- Fero Oláh – keyboards, vocals (1990–1991)
- Juraj Farkaš – solo guitar (1996)
- Zdeno Baláž – drums (1996)
- Juraj Burian – acoustic guitar, vocals (1998)
- Tony Benedek – percussion (1998, 2004–2005)
- Ľuboš Stankovský – drums (2001)
- Gapeel's vocal group – vocals (2003)
- G-Strinx – violins (2007–2008)
- Lenka Lo Hrůzová – vocals (2014)
- Nina Kraljić – vocals (2016)
- Kristína Mihaľová – vocals (2018–2019)
- Laura Wengová – vocals (2018–2019)
- Zuzana Ďurdinová – vocals (2018–2019)
- Marián Svetlík – violin (2018–2019)
- Juraj Madari – viola (2018–2019)
- Petra Pálková – violin (2018–2019)
- Júlia Mušáková – violin (2018–2019)

== Discography ==
Studio albums

- 1981 – Ôsmy svetadiel
- 1982 – Nie Sme zlí
- 1983 – Elán 3
- 1985 – Hodina slovenčiny
- 1986 – Detektívka
- 1988 – Nebezpečný náklad
- 1989 – Rabaka
- 1991 – Netvor z čiernej hviezdy Q7A
- 1994 – Hodina angličtiny
- 1997 – Hodina pravdy
- 2002 – Elán 3000
- 2003 – Tretie oko
- 2010 – Anjelska daň
- 2014 – Živých nás nedostanú
- 2019 – Najvyšší čas

English studio albums

- 1982 – Kamikadze Lover
- 1984 – Nightshift
- 1985 – Schoolparty
- 1987 – Missing
- 1989 – Midnight in the City

Live albums

- 1998 – Elán Unplugged (2 CD)
- 2004 – Elán: Megakoncert
- 2005 – Elán na Hrade
- 2007 – Elán Unplugged, Carnegie Hall, New York
- 2013 – Elán v divadle
- 2016 – Elán Live (Best of Vol.2)

Compilations

- 1987 – Neviem byť sám
- 1992 – Legenda 1
- 1992 – Legenda 2
- 1995 – Hodina nehy
- 1997 – Classic
- 1997 – Legenda 3
- 1998 – Legenda 4
- 1999 – Jožo... (2 CD)
- 2000 – Láska je stvorená
- 2000 – Legenda 5 – Posledná...
- 2001 – Neviem byť sám 2001: roky a rock
- 2001 – Otázniky/Všetko čo máš
- 2009 – Hodina Rocku
- 2015 – Kamaráti
- 2019 – Zlodej slnečníc

== See also ==
- The 100 Greatest Slovak Albums of All Time
