= Vašo Patejdl =

Slovak musician and composer (1954–2023)

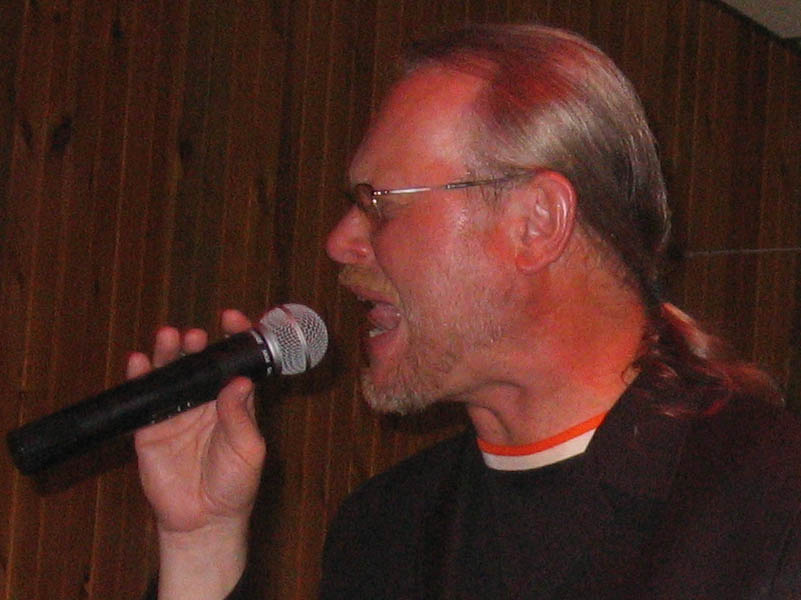
- Patejdl performing in 2007

Background information
- Born: Václav Patejdl; 10 October 1954; Karlovy Vary, Czechoslovakia
- Died: 19 August 2023 (aged 68)
- Genres: Rock, pop
- Occupations: Musician, composer
- Instruments: Vocals; piano; keyboards
- Years active: 1968–2023
- Formerly of: Elán

Vašo Patejdl (born Václav Patejdl; 10 October 1954 – 19 August 2023) was a Slovak musician and composer. He was best known for being a co-founder and long-term member of the pop-rock band Elán. He wrote songs for other musicians, including the Richard Müller single "Po schodoch", and he composed music for films, such as Fontána pre Zuzanu (1985) and The Seven Ravens (2015). Patejdl also released a number of solo albums throughout his career, both in Slovak and English. He died on 19 August 2023, at the age of 68.

== Early life and education ==
Václav Patejdl was born in Karlovy Vary to a Czech father and Slovak mother. When he was a child, his family moved to Bratislava. He studied composition at the Academy of Performing Arts in Bratislava under the direction of Alexander Moyzes.

== Career ==
=== With Elán ===
Patejdl co-founded the band Elán in 1968 and contributed to the group's first four albums. In 1984, he left to focus on solo projects but remained on good terms with the remaining members and often collaborated with them. In 1996, he returned to Elán and remained a member until his death. His last performance with the group was in 2018, as they toured Czechia and Slovakia.

According to Denník N, Patejdl, along with Jozef Ráž and Ján Baláž, formed the core of Elán over the course of its 55-year existence.

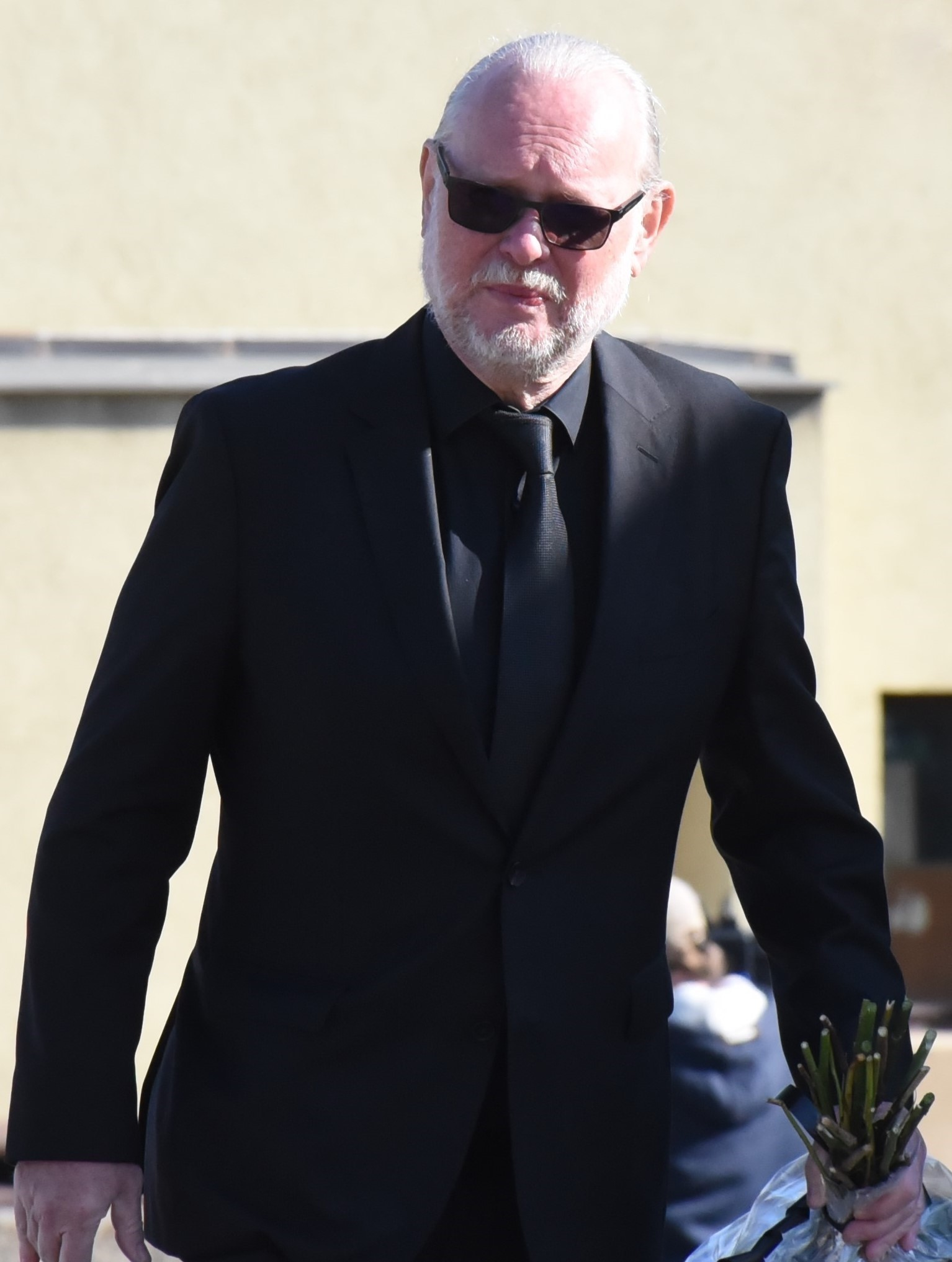
Patejdl in 2022

=== Solo work ===
Throughout his career, Patejdl recorded nine solo albums, in Slovak and English. In addition to pop, he also produced music for children. He won second place at the Bratislavská lýra song contest in 1985 and first in 1987.

Patejdl founded and ran the recording studio Relax in Bratislava, which he made available to other musicians in addition to using it to record his own music.

The musician played his final concert in July 2023, approximately one month before his death.

=== Composition ===
Patejdl composed songs for pop singers, including Beáta Dubasová, Marika Gombitová, and Heidi Janků. He is the author of the hit song "Po schodoch", performed by the band Banket and later solo by its lead singer, Richard Müller.

Patejdl also composed film music, notably for the 1985 movie Fontána pre Zuzanu and its two sequels and the award-winning 2015 fairy tale film The Seven Ravens, which got him a nomination for Best Music at the Czech Lion Awards and Best Background Music at the Indian Cine Film Festival.

== Death ==
Patejdl died of pancreatic cancer on 19 August 2023, at the age of 68.

In reaction to his death, President of Slovakia Zuzana Čaputová, singers Beáta Dubasová and Helena Vondráčková, as well as the surviving members of Elán, praised his contribution to Slovak popular music.

== Discography ==
=== with Elán ===
- Ôsmy svetadiel (1981)
- Nie sme zlí (1982)
- Elán 3 (1983)
- Hodina slovenčiny (1985)
- Hodina pravdy (1997)
- Elán 3000 (2002)
- Tretie oko (2003)
- Anjelska daň (2010)
- Živých nás nedostanú (2014)
- Najvyšší čas (2019)

=== Solo ===
Studio albums

- Chlapčenský úsmev (1986)
- We Don't Fall (English version of Chlapčenský úsmev, 1987)
- Lov na City (1987)
- Mon amour (1989)
- You Still Are You (English version of Lov na City, 1989)
- Dlhá cesta (1990)
- Labyrint sveta (1991)
- Esoteric: The Holy Grail (1993)
- Spovedaj ma zo spomienok (1997)
- Do očí (2004)
- Moje Československé Vianoce (2020)

Compilations

- The Best of Vašo Patejdl (1994)
- Antológia 1 (1978–1990) (1999)
- Antológia 2 (1978–1990) (1999)
- Gold (2005)
- Trojalbum (To Nejlepší 1981–2015) (2015)
- Opus 1986 – 1990 (box set, 2015)
- Důkaz Lásky (CD + DVD, 2017)

Children's albums

- Peter, Vašo a Beáta Deťom with Peter Nagy and Beáta Dubasová (1987)
- Paťa, Kuko a Vašo – Hudobná škola with Patrícia Jarjabková (1993)
- Hudobná škola Vaša Patejdla II: Maškrtný bál (1995)

Soundtracks

- Fontána pre Zuzanu (1985)
- Fontána pre Zuzanu 2 (1993) (with Pavol Habera)
- Fontána pre Zuzanu 3 (1999)
- The Seven Ravens (2015)

Musicals

- Snehulienka a sedem pretekárov (1991)
- Jozef a jeho zázračný farebný plášť (Joseph and the Amazing Technicolor Dreamcoat) (Prague, 1994)
- Grand Pierrot (Prague, 1995)
- Adam Šangala (Prague, 2003)
- Jack Rozparovač (Prague, 2006)

=== Collaborations ===
- Voľné miesto v srdci by Marika Gombitová (1986)
- Ateliér duše by Marika Gombitová (1987)
- Slávnosť úprimných slov with Marika Gombitová, Ján Lehotský, and Richard Müller (EP, 1987)
- Dlhá cesta / Long Way with Alan Roy Scott (1990)
- Labyrinth of the World / Labyrint sveta with Jaroslav Svěcený (1991)
- Zostaň by Marika Gombitová (1993)
- Good Vibes: Remixes by Double L & Vinyl Culture (1997)

== Awards ==
- Silver Bratislavská lýra – Elán – (Vašo Patejdl / Ľuboš Zeman ) – for the song "Kaskadér" (1980)
- Silver Bratislavská lýra – Vašo Patejdl – (Vašo Patejdl / Ľuboš Zeman) – for the song "Chlapčenský úsmev" (1985)
- Gold Bratislavská lýra – Vašo Patejdl – (Vašo Patejdl / Ľuboš Zeman) – for the song "Umenie žiť" (1987)
- Journalists Award at the Bratislavská lýra – Vašo Patejdl / Ľuboš Zeman – for the song "Muzikantské byty", with Beáta Dubasová (1989)
