= Miroslav Žbirka =

Slovak musician (1952–2021)

Miroslav "Meky" Žbirka
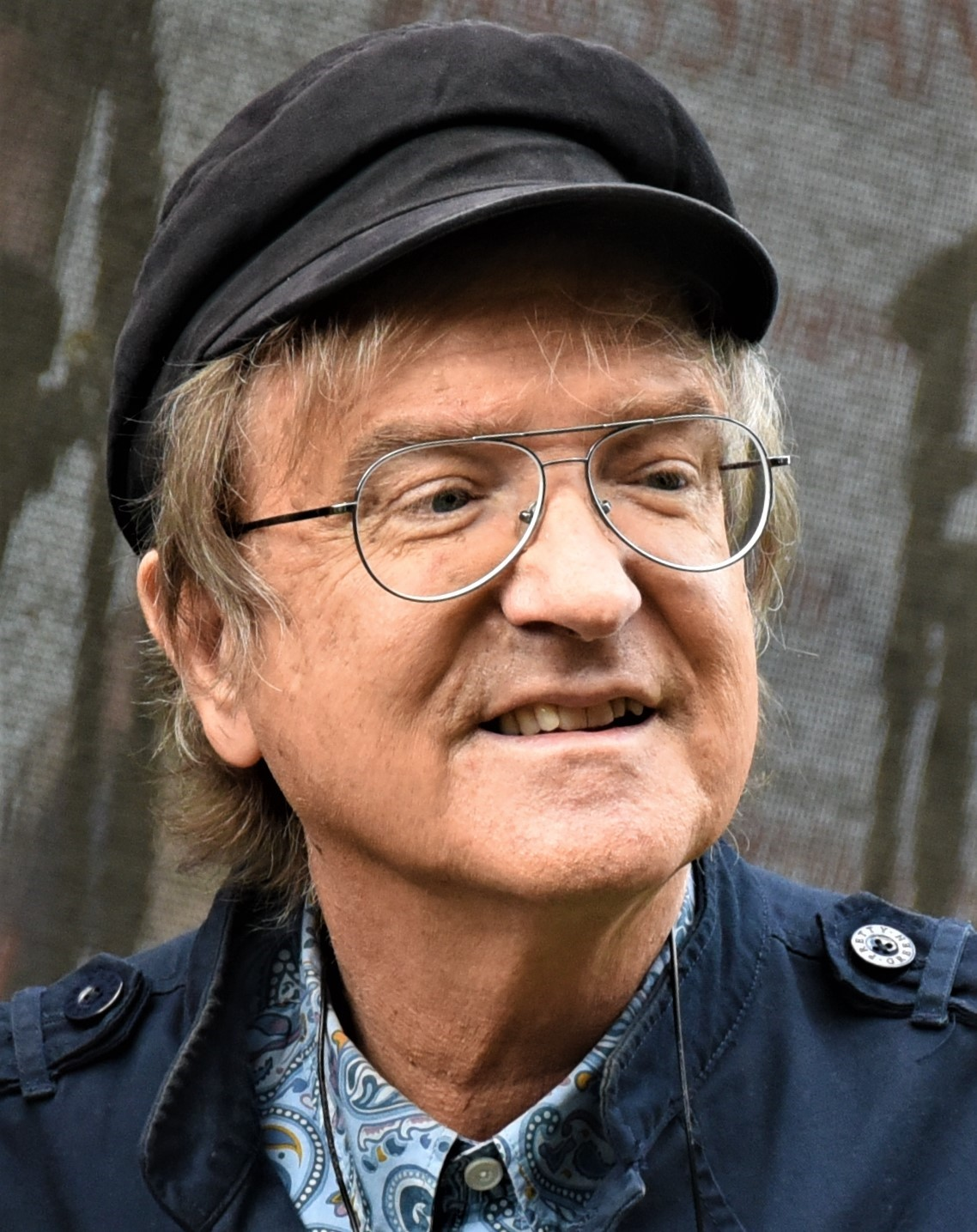
- Žbirka in 2018

Background information
- Also known as: Miro Žbirka
- Born: 21 October 1952; Bratislava, Czechoslovakia
- Origin: Fiľakovo
- Died: 10 November 2021 (aged 69) Prague, Czech Republic
- Genres: Pop rock, new wave, folk
- Occupations: Singer, songwriter
- Instrument: Guitar
- Years active: 1968–2021
- Labels: OPUS, Bonton, Sony BMG
- Member of: Modus, Limit
- Website: zbirka.cz

"V slepých uličkách" with Marika Gombitová
An international version of the duet, familiar under title "The Love Song", was released on Žbirka's export album Doctor Dream (1981).

"You Know I Love You (Love Song)"
A new English version entitled as "You Know I Love You (Love Song)" appeared on remixed collection Like a Hero: The Best of Miro (2008).

Miroslav "Miro" Žbirka (21 October 1952 – 10 November 2021) was a Slovak pop and rock singer and songwriter, widely popular in 1980s Czechoslovakia. Born in Bratislava to a Slovak father and an English mother, he sang in Slovak, English, and Czech. He sometimes recorded in London, but lived in Slovakia and since early 1990s in Prague, Czech Republic, where he died.

In the late 1970s, Žbirka co-founded two Czechoslovak pop music bands, Modus and Limit. In 1982, he rose to fame by winning the annual Zlatý slavík award for the best male singer in Czechoslovakia. After the 1992 division of Czechoslovakia, he repeated this achievement in the Slovak annual Slávik Awards, coming number one in the annual end of year charts in 2002, 2004 and 2005.

Žbirka had some performances with Jon Anderson in 2012. Asteroid 5895 Žbirka, discovered by Czech astronomer Zdeňka Vávrová in 1982, was named in his honor (the official naming citation was published by the Minor Planet Center on 27 August 2019 (MPC 115893)). He died from pneumonia in Prague on 10 November 2021, leaving behind recorded vocals for his 15th studio album, Posledné veci (Last Things), which was completed by his son David Žbirka in Konk Studios by May 2022.

== Discography ==
Studio albums

- 1980: Doktor Sen
- 1982: Sezónne lásky
- 1983: Roky a dni
- 1984: Nemoderný chalan
- 1986: Chlapec z ulice
- 1988: Zlomky poznania
- 1990: K.O.
- 1993: Songs for Children (designed for children)
- 1994: Samozrejmý svet
- 1997: Meky
- 1999: Songs for Boys & Girls (designed for children)
- 2001: Modrý album
- 2005: Dúhy
- 2009: Empatia
- 2015: Miro
- 2018: Double Album
- 2022: Posledné veci
- 2026: Meky Special

Export albums

- 1981: Doctor Dream (aka Miro and/or Like a Hero)
- 1982: Light of My Life
- 1983: Giant Step (aka Dear Boy)
- 1989: Step by Step

== Awards ==
=== Major awards ===
| Year | Nominated work | Award | Category | Result | Ref |
|---|---|---|---|---|---|
| 1977 | "Úsmev" with Modus | Bratislavská lýra | Audience Choice | Won | |
| 1977 | "Úsmev" with Modus | Bratislavská lýra | Czechoslovak Authors | Won | |
| 1982 | "Atlantída" | Bratislavská lýra | Czechoslovak Authors | Nominated | |
| 1982 | "The Love Song" | Villach Music Festival | — | Won | |
| 1982 | "The Love Song" | Hitradio Ö3 | — | Won | |
| 1983 | "Nechodí" | Bratislavská lýra | Czechoslovak Authors | Won | |
| 2002 | "Čo bolí, to prebolí" feat. Martha | Aurel Awards | Song of the Year | Won | |
| 2003 | Himself | Aurel Awards | Best Male Vocal Performance | Nominated | |
| 2004 | Himself | Aurel Awards | Best Male Vocal Performance | Won | |
| 2005 | Himself | Aurel Awards | Best Male Vocal Performance | Nominated | |
| 2006 | Himself | Aurel Awards | Hall of Fame | Inducted | |
| 2007 | Himself | Aurel Awards | Best Male Vocal Performance | Nominated | |
| 2007 | Doktor Sen | Best Slovak Album of All Time | — | Nominated | |
| 2007 | Sezónne lásky | Best Slovak Album of All Time | — | Nominated | |
| 2007 | Modrý album | Best Slovak Album of All Time | — | Nominated | |
| 2009 | Empatia | Anděl Awards | Album of the Year | Nominated | |

=== Music polls ===
Zlatý slavík by Mladý svět, Czechoslovakia

| Year | Nomination | Category | Result | Ref |
|---|---|---|---|---|
| 1979 | Himself | Male Singer | #18 | |
| 1980 | Himself | Male Singer | #19 | |
| 1981 | Himself | Male Singer | #7 | |
| 1982 | Himself | Male Singer | #1 | |
| 1983 | Himself | Male Singer | #2 | |
| 1984 | Himself | Male Singer | #3 | |
| 1985 | Himself | Male Singer | #4 | |
| 1986 | Himself | Male Singer | #4 | |
| 1987 | Himself | Male Singer | #4 | |
| 1988 | Himself | Male Singer | #13 | |
| 1989 | Himself | Male Singer | #17 | |
| 1990 | Himself | Male Singer | #18 | |
| 1991 | Himself | Male Singer | #20 | |

Český slavík by Mattoni, Czech Republic

| Year | Nomination | Category | Result | Ref |
|---|---|---|---|---|
| 2000 | Himself | Male Singer | #125 | |
| 2001 | Himself | Male Singer | #131 | |
| 2002 | Himself | Male Singer | #29 | |
| 2003 | Himself | Male Singer | #28 | |
| 2004 | Himself | Male Singer | #18 | |
| 2005 | Himself | Male Singer | #14 | |
| 2006 | Himself | Male Singer | #15 | |
| 2007 | Himself | Male Singer | #19 | |
| 2008 | Himself | Male Singer | #17 | |
| 2009 | Himself | Male Singer | #18 | |
| 2010 | Himself | Male Singer | #26 | |
| 2011 | Himself | Male Singer | #24 | |
| 2012 | Himself | Male Singer | #20 | |
| 2013 | Himself | Male Singer | #24 | |
| 2014 | Himself | Male Singer | #26 | |

Slávik by FORZA, Slovakia

| Year | Nomination | Category | Result | Ref |
|---|---|---|---|---|
| 1998 | Himself | Male Singer | #3 | |
| 1999 | Himself | Male Singer | #4 | |
| 2000 | Himself | Male Singer | #5 | |
| 2001 | Himself | Male Singer | #5 | |
| 2002 | Himself | Male Singer | #1 | |
| 2002 | Himself | Rádio Expres Slávik | #1 | |
| 2003 | Himself | Male Singer | #2 | |
| 2004 | Himself | Male Singer | #1 | |
| 2005 | Himself | Male Singer | #1 | |
| 2006 | Himself | Male Singer | #2 | |
| 2007 | Himself | Male Singer | #2 | |
| 2008 | Himself | Male Singer | #3 | |
| 2009 | Himself | Male Singer | #2 | |
| 2010 | Himself | Male Singer | #3 | |
| 2011 | Himself | Male Singer | #3 | |
| 2012 | Himself | Male Singer | #2 | |

OTO by Art Production Agency, Slovakia

| Year | Nomination | Category | Result | Ref |
|---|---|---|---|---|
| 2001 | Himself | Male Singer | #1 | |
| 2002 | Himself | Male Singer | #1 | |
| 2003 | Himself | Male Singer | #1 | |
| 2004 | Himself | Male Singer | #1 | |
| 2005 | Himself | Male Singer | #1 | |
| 2006 | Himself | Male Singer | #3 | |
| 2007 | Himself | Male Singer | #2 | |
| 2008 | Himself | Male Singer | #2 | |
| 2009 | Himself | Male Singer | #2 | |
| 2010 | Himself | Male Singer | #2 | |
| 2011 | Himself | Male Singer | #3 | |
| 2012 | Himself | Male Singer | #1 | |
| 2013 | Himself | Male Singer | #1 | |
| 2014 | Himself | Male Singer | #2 | |

== Bibliography ==
- Žbirka, Miroslav; Kollár, Jozef (2002). Meky (1st ed.). Bratislava, Slovakia: IKAR. p. 165. ISBN 978-80-249-0134-3. OCLC 53266790. (in Slovak and Czech)
