= Czech Republic in the Eurovision Song Contest 2021 =

- Eurovision Song Contest 2021
- Participating broadcaster: Czech Television (ČT)
- Country: Czech Republic
- Selection process: Internal selection
- Announcement date: Artist: 13 May 2020; Song: 16 February 2021

Competing entry
- Song: "Omaga"
- Artist: Benny Cristo
- Songwriters: Ben Cristóvão; Filip Vlček

Placement
- Semi-final result: Failed to qualify (15th)

Participation chronology

The Czech Republic was represented at the Eurovision Song Contest 2021 with the song "Omaga" performed by Benny Cristo and written by Cristo along with Filip Vlček. Benny Cristo was announced by the Czech broadcaster Česká televize (ČT) on 13 May 2020 as the Czech representative for the 2021 contest in Rotterdam, Netherlands after he was due to compete in the 2020 contest with "Kemama" before the 2020 event's cancellation, while the song "Omaga" was presented to the public on 16 February 2021.

Czech Republic was drawn to compete in the second semi-final of the Eurovision Song Contest which took place on 20 May 2021. Performing during the show in position 3, "Omaga" was not announced among the top 10 entries of the second semi-final and therefore did not qualify to compete in the final. It was later revealed that Czech Republic placed fifteenth out of the 17 participating countries in the semi-final with 23 points.

== Background ==
Prior to the 2021 Contest, the Czech Republic had participated in the Eurovision Song Contest eight times since its first entry in 2007. The nation competed in the contest on three consecutive occasions between 2007 and 2009 without qualifying to the final: in 2007 Kabát performing "Malá dáma" placed 28th (last) in the semi-final achieving only one point, in 2008 Tereza Kerndlová performing "Have Some Fun" placed 18th (second to last) in her semi-final scoring nine points and in 2009 Gipsy.cz performing the song "Aven Romale" placed 18th (last) in their semi-final failing to score any points. The Czech broadcaster withdrew from the contest between 2010 and 2014 citing reasons such as low viewing figures and poor results for their absence. Since returning to the contest in 2015 and qualifying to the final for the first time in 2016, Czech Republic has featured in three finals. In 2019, the country qualified to the final placing 11th with Lake Malawi and the song "Friend of a Friend".

The Czech national broadcaster, Česká televize (ČT), broadcasts the event within Czech Republic and organises the selection process for the nation's entry. The broadcaster has used both national finals and internal selections to select the Czech Eurovision entry in the past. ČT confirmed their intentions to participate at the 2021 Eurovision Song Contest in May 2020. The broadcaster later confirmed in January 2021 that the Czech entry for the 2021 contest would be selected internally.

== Before Eurovision ==
=== Internal selection ===
The Czech entry for the Eurovision Song Contest 2021 was selected internally by ČT. On 13 May 2020, the broadcaster confirmed that Benny Cristo would remain as the Czech representative for the 2021 Eurovision Song Contest. Kryštof Šámal was assigned as the new Czech Head of Delegation for the Eurovision Song Contest and managed the song selection process. On 4 January 2021, Šámal announced that several songs were in contention and that a decision regarding which one would be selected was imminent. The song "Omaga" was presented to the public as the Czech entry via the release of the official music video, directed by Jan Strach, on 16 February 2021. "Omaga", which was written by Benny Cristo himself together with Filip Vlček, was selected by ČT and was one of three songs shortlisted by the broadcaster from several proposals that Cristo submitted in December 2021.

== At Eurovision ==
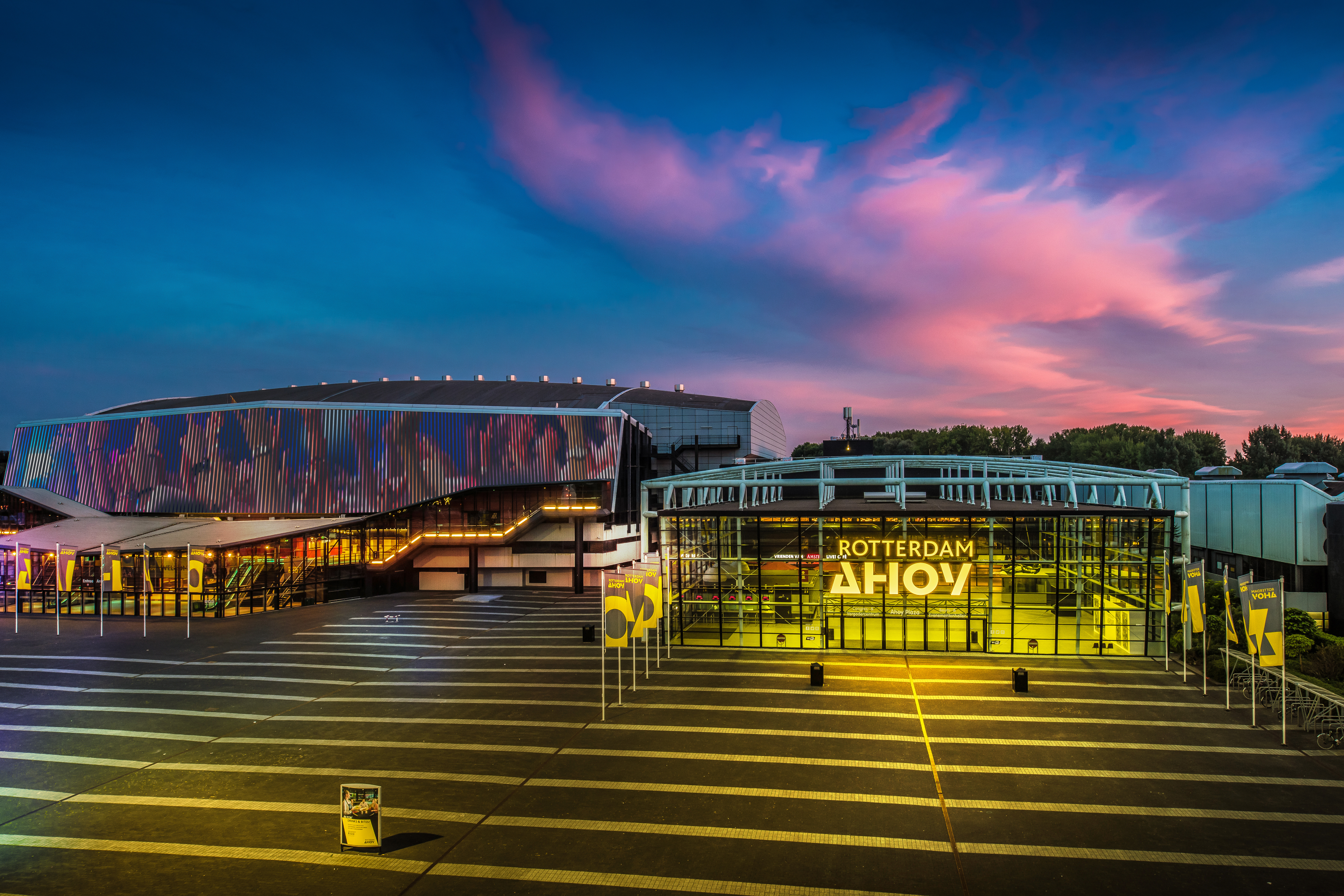
The Eurovision Song Contest 2021 took place at the Rotterdam Ahoy in Rotterdam, Netherlands

According to Eurovision rules, all nations with the exceptions of the host country and the "Big Five" (France, Germany, Italy, Spain and the United Kingdom) are required to qualify from one of two semi-finals in order to compete in the final; the top ten countries from each semi-final progress to the final. The European Broadcasting Union (EBU) split up the competing countries into six different pots based on voting patterns from previous contests, with countries with favourable voting histories put into the same pot. The semi-final allocation draw held for the Eurovision Song Contest 2020 on 28 January 2020 was used for the 2021 contest, which Czech Republic was placed into the second semi-final, to be held on 20 May 2021, and was scheduled to perform in the first half of the show.

Once all the competing songs for the 2021 contest had been released, the running order for the semi-finals was decided by the shows' producers rather than through another draw, so that similar songs were not placed next to each other. Czech Republic was set to perform in position 3, following the entry from Estonia and before the entry from Greece.

In the Czech Republic, the semi-finals were broadcast on ČT2 and the final was broadcast on ČT1. All three shows featured commentary by Jan Maxián and 2019 Czech Eurovision representative Albert Černý. The Czech spokesperson, who will announce the top 12-point score awarded by the Czech jury during the final, was Taťána Kuchařová.

=== Semi-final ===
Benny Cristo took part in technical rehearsals on 10 and 13 May, followed by dress rehearsals on 19 and 20 May. This included the jury show on 19 May where the professional juries of each country watched and voted on the competing entries.

The Czech performance featured Benny Cristo wearing a gold sparkly jacket and trousers with a red rose on his chest and appearing on stage with four dancers in street-casual outfits. Cristo's outfit was designed by Jiri Kalfar. The performance began with Cristo in the centre of several lighting poles, of which he later walked out from and was gradually joined by the dancers. The LED screens displayed kaleidoscopic images with a psychedelic colour scheme, and the performers concluded the performance by walking the catwalk to the B-stage. The four dancers that performed with Cristo were Alberto Gola, Aneta Prchalová, Anna Lipoldová and Robin Šeba, while the co-composer of "Omaga" Filip Vlček was also featured as an off-stage backing vocalist.

At the end of the show, the Czech Republic was not announced among the top 10 entries in the second semi-final and therefore failed to qualify to compete in the final. It was later revealed that Czech Republic placed fifteenth in the semi-final, receiving a total of 23 points: 0 points from the televoting and 23 points from the juries.

=== Voting ===
Voting during the three shows involved each country awarding two sets of points from 1-8, 10 and 12: one from their professional jury and the other from televoting. Each nation's jury consisted of five music industry professionals who are citizens of the country they represent. This jury judged each entry based on: vocal capacity; the stage performance; the song's composition and originality; and the overall impression by the act. In addition, each member of a national jury may only take part in the panel once every three years, and no jury was permitted to discuss of their vote with other members or be related in any way to any of the competing acts in such a way that they cannot vote impartially and independently. The individual rankings of each jury member in an anonymised form as well as the nation's televoting results were released shortly after the grand final.

Below is a breakdown of points awarded to the Czech Republic and awarded by the Czech Republic in the second semi-final and grand final of the contest, and the breakdown of the jury voting and televoting conducted during the two shows:

==== Points awarded to the Czech Republic ====
Points awarded to the Czech Republic (Semi-final 2)
Score	Televote	Jury
12 points		
10 points		
8 points		
7 points		
6 points		Georgia
5 points		Bulgaria; Portugal
4 points		Greece
3 points		
2 points		France
1 point		Moldova

==== Points awarded by the Czech Republic ====
Points awarded by the Czech Republic (Semi-final 2)
Score	Televote	Jury
12 points	Moldova	Portugal
10 points	Iceland	Iceland
8 points	Finland	Switzerland
7 points	Switzerland	Bulgaria
6 points	Bulgaria	Finland
5 points	Serbia	Greece
4 points	Portugal	Serbia
3 points	Denmark	Denmark
2 points	Greece	San Marino
1 point	Estonia	Albania

Points awarded by the Czech Republic (Final)
Score	Televote	Jury
12 points	Moldova	Portugal
10 points	Ukraine	France
8 points	Greece	Iceland
7 points	Iceland	Malta
6 points	Italy	Italy
5 points	Russia	Switzerland
4 points	Finland	Bulgaria
3 points	Switzerland	Belgium
2 points	France	Russia
1 point	Lithuania	Finland

==== Detailed voting results ====
The following members comprised the Czech jury:

- Milan Havrda (Boris Carloff)
- Tonya Graves
- Deborah Kahl (Debbi)
- Eliška Mrázová (Elis Mraz)
- Miroslav Žbirka

Detailed voting results from the Czech Republic (Semi-final 2)
R/O	Country	Jury							Televote	
R/O	Country	Juror A	Juror B	Juror C	Juror D	Juror E	Rank	Points	Rank	Points
01	San Marino	9	10	7	11	8	9	2	11	
02	Estonia	10	7	16	12	11	11		10	1
03	Czech Republic									
04	Greece	8	4	6	8	9	6	5	9	2
05	Austria	12	11	10	9	13	13		14	
06	Poland	14	8	15	14	15	14		13	
07	Moldova	5	13	14	15	14	12		1	12
08	Iceland	2	1	2	2	3	2	10	2	10
09	Serbia	6	14	8	7	7	7	4	6	5
10	Georgia	16	16	12	13	12	15		16	
11	Albania	7	12	9	10	10	10	1	12	
12	Portugal	3	3	1	1	1	1	12	7	4
13	Bulgaria	13	2	5	4	2	4	7	5	6
14	Finland	4	6	4	5	4	5	6	3	8
15	Latvia	11	15	13	16	16	16		15	
16	Switzerland	1	5	3	3	6	3	8	4	7
17	Denmark	15	9	11	6	5	8	3	8	3

Detailed voting results from the Czech Republic (Final)
R/O	Country	Jury							Televote	
R/O	Country	Juror A	Juror B	Juror C	Juror D	Juror E	Rank	Points	Rank	Points
01	Cyprus	15	21	24	17	20	22		20	
02	Albania	21	25	18	26	19	25		23	
03	Israel	14	23	16	14	12	17		15	
04	Belgium	22	4	10	7	10	8	3	19	
05	Russia	7	22	4	10	11	9	2	6	5
06	Malta	2	16	3	6	3	4	7	14	
07	Portugal	3	3	2	2	2	1	12	21	
08	Serbia	9	24	17	16	13	16		11	
09	United Kingdom	18	8	25	11	16	13		26	
10	Greece	16	9	13	12	15	12		3	8
11	Switzerland	5	7	6	5	6	6	5	8	3
12	Iceland	4	1	5	4	5	3	8	4	7
13	Spain	10	13	11	23	17	15		24	
14	Moldova	24	26	26	24	26	26		1	12
15	Germany	25	6	15	22	25	14		18	
16	Finland	8	12	8	8	8	10	1	7	4
17	Bulgaria	11	2	9	9	4	7	4	12	
18	Lithuania	12	20	14	25	24	21		10	1
19	Ukraine	13	5	12	15	23	11		2	10
20	France	6	11	1	1	1	2	10	9	2
21	Azerbaijan	19	19	19	20	22	23		17	
22	Norway	26	10	23	19	21	20		13	
23	Netherlands	17	15	20	13	14	19		25	
24	Italy	1	14	7	3	7	5	6	5	6
25	Sweden	20	17	22	18	9	18		16	
26	San Marino	23	18	21	21	18	24		22	
