= Czech Republic in the Eurovision Song Contest 2020 =

- Eurovision Song Contest 2020
- Participating broadcaster: Czech Television (ČT)
- Country: Czech Republic
- Selection process: Eurovision Song CZ 2020
- Selection date: 3 February 2020

Competing entry
- Song: "Kemama"
- Artist: Benny Cristo
- Songwriters: Osama Verse-Atile; Ben Cristóvão; Charles Sarpong; Rudy Ray

Placement
- Final result: Contest cancelled

Participation chronology

The Czech Republic was set to be represented at the Eurovision Song Contest 2020 with the song "Kemama" written by Osama Verse-Atile, Ben Cristóvão, Charles Sarpong and Rudy Ray. The song was performed by Benny Cristo, which is the artistic name of singer Ben Cristóvão. The Czech broadcaster Česká televize (ČT) organised the national final Eurovision Song CZ 2020 in order to select the Czech entry for the 2020 contest in Rotterdam, Netherlands. Seven entries competed in the national final and "Kemama" performed by Benny Cristo was announced as the winner on 3 February 2020 following the combination of votes from an eleven-member international jury panel and a public vote.

Czech Republic was drawn to compete in the second semi-final of the Eurovision Song Contest which took place on 14 May 2020. However, the contest was cancelled due to the COVID-19 pandemic.

== Background ==
Prior to the 2020 contest, the Czech Republic had participated in the Eurovision Song Contest eight times since its first entry in 2007. The nation competed in the contest on three consecutive occasions between 2007 and 2009 without qualifying to the final: in 2007 Kabát performing "Malá dáma" placed 28th (last) in the semi-final achieving only one point, in 2008 Tereza Kerndlová performing "Have Some Fun" placed 18th (second to last) in her semi-final scoring nine points and in 2009 Gipsy.cz performing the song "Aven Romale" placed 18th (last) in their semi-final failing to score any points. The Czech broadcaster withdrew from the contest between 2010 and 2014 citing reasons such as low viewing figures and poor results for their absence. Since returning to the contest in 2015 and qualifying to the final for the first time in 2016, Czech Republic has featured in three finals. In 2019, the country qualified to the final placing 11th with Lake Malawi and the song "Friend of a Friend".

The Czech national broadcaster, Česká televize (ČT), broadcasts the event within Czech Republic and organises the selection process for the nation's entry. The broadcaster has used both national finals and internal selections to select the Czech Eurovision entry in the past. ČT confirmed their intentions to participate at the 2020 Eurovision Song Contest in January 2019, while also confirming that the Czech entry for the 2020 contest would be selected through a national final.

== Before Eurovision ==
=== Eurovision Song CZ 2020 ===
Eurovision Song CZ 2020 was the national final organised by ČT in order to select the Czech entry for the Eurovision Song Contest 2020. Eight entries participated in the competition which took place online between 20 January and 2 February 2020, with the winner being selected via a jury and public vote and announced on 3 February 2020.

==== Competing entries ====
Artists and composers were able to submit their proposals to the broadcaster between 31 August 2019 and 31 October 2019. Artists were required to have Czech citizenship and for groups of a maximum of six members, at least one of the lead vocalists were required to have Czech citizenship. Songwriters of any nationality were able to submit songs. The broadcaster received 152 submissions at the closing of the deadline, of which 72 were written by Czech songwriters. A five-member jury consisting of creative director of the Czech Eurovision Song Contest delegation Jan Potměšil, Czech Head of Delegation for the Eurovision Song Contest Jan Bors, Head of Press for the Czech Eurovision Song Contest delegation Kryštof Šámal, Austrian choreographer Marvin Dietmann and Czech Deputy Head of Delegation for the Eurovision Song Contest Cyril Hirsch shortlisted 20 entries from the submissions received and selected eight entries for the national final, three to four of them through an audition round held on 27 and 28 August 2018 at the Studio A of ČT that featured 12 potential entries.

On 2 December 2019, ČT announced that one of the entries had been withdrawn from the national final, and the remaining seven entries were announced during a press conference on 13 January 2020. Among the competing artists were Barbora Mochowa and Pam Rabbit, both of them which competed in previous editions of Eurovision Song CZ.

==== Final ====
Seven entries competed in the national final and the winner was determined by the combination of votes from an eleven-member international jury panel and a public vote held via the official Eurovision Song Contest application between 20 January and 2 February 2020. The international jury consisted of ten former Eurovision entrants, while both international and Czech users were able to vote via the app. Votes from users in the Czech Republic were counted towards the public vote, while votes from international users were counted towards the jury vote and had a weighting equal to the votes of a single jury member. The winner, "Kemama" performed by Benny Cristo, was announced on 3 February 2020.

The international jury panel consisted of:

- Stig Rästa – represented Estonia in 2015 (with Elina Born)
- Zalagasper – represented Slovenia in 2019
- Keiino – represented Norway in 2019
- Kristian Kostov – represented Bulgaria in 2017
- Isaiah Firebrace – represented Australia in 2017
- Sebastian Rejman – represented Finland in 2019 (with Darude)
- Miki Núñez – represented Spain in 2019
- Kasia Moś – represented Poland in 2017
- Michela Pace – represented Malta in 2019
- Katerine Duska – represented Greece in 2019

Artist	Song	Songwriter(s)	Jury	Public	Total	Place
Barbora Mochowa	"White & Black Holes"	Barbora Mochowa, Viliam Béreš, Tereza Frantová	12	2	14	3
Benny Cristo	"Kemama"	Osama Verse-Atile, Ben Cristóvão, Charles Sarpong, Rudy Ray	10	12	22	1
Elis Mraz feat. Čis T	"Wanna Be Like"	Elis Mraz, Čis T	8	10	18	2
Karelll	"At Least We've Tried"	Karel Peterka	6	4	10	5
Olga Lounová	"Dark Water"	Olga Lounová, Aleena Gibson, Trevor Muzzy, Ashley Dudokovich	3	6	9	6
Pam Rabbit	"Get Up"	Boris Carloff, Pamela Koky	6	3	9	7
We All Poop	"All the Blood (Positive Song Actually)"	Šimon Martínek, Michal Jiráň, Jakub Božek	4	8	12	4

Detailed International Jury Votes
Song	Stig Rästa	Zalagasper	Keiino	Kristian Kostov	Isaiah Firebrace	Sebastian Rejman	Miki Núñez	Kasia Moś	Michela Pace	Katerine Duska	International votes	Total	Points
Song	EST	SLO	NOR	BUL	AUS	FIN	ESP	POL	MLT	GRE	International votes	Total	Points
"White & Black Holes"	10	10	3	12	8	3	3	10	12	12	4	87	12
"Kemama"	12	6	8	6	12	6	8	4	2	6	8	78	10
"Wanna Be Like"	8	2	12	8	10	4	10	3	4	4	10	75	8
"At Least We've Tried"	2	4	4	3	6	12	12	6	8	8	2	67	6
"Dark Water"	3	8	10	2	4	10	2	2	6	2	6	55	3
"Get Up"	4	12	2	10	3	8	4	8	3	10	3	67	6
"All the Blood (Positive Song Actually)"	6	3	6	4	2	2	6	12	10	3	12	66	4

=== Preparation ===
Following the announcement of Benny Cristo as the winner of Eurovision Song CZ 2020, the singer revealed that a revamped version of "Kemama" would be produced in Kenya for the Eurovision Song Contest. The final version of the song was released on 10 March, but due to negative public feedback a second revamp was then produced and released on 16 March.

=== Promotion ===
Benny Cristo specifically promoted "Kemama" as the Czech Eurovision entry on 15 February 2020 by performing the song during the second semi-final of the Ukrainian Eurovision national final.

== At Eurovision ==
According to Eurovision rules, all nations with the exceptions of the host country and the "Big Five" (France, Germany, Italy, Spain and the United Kingdom) are required to qualify from one of two semi-finals in order to compete for the final; the top ten countries from each semi-final progress to the final. The European Broadcasting Union (EBU) split up the competing countries into six different pots based on voting patterns from previous contests, with countries with favourable voting histories put into the same pot. On 28 January 2020, a special allocation draw was held which placed each country into one of the two semi-finals, as well as which half of the show they would perform in. The Czech Republic was placed into the second semi-final, to be held on 14 May 2020, and was scheduled to perform in the first half of the show. However, due to 2019-20 pandemic of Coronavirus, the contest was cancelled.

Prior to the Eurovision Song Celebration YouTube broadcast in place of the semi-finals, it was revealed that the Czech Republic was set to perform in position 6, before the entry from San Marino and after the entry from Serbia.
