= Czech Republic in the Eurovision Song Contest =

- Eurovision Song Contest
- Participating broadcaster: Czech Television (ČT) (2007–2026)

Participation summary
- Appearances: 14 (6 finals)
- First appearance: 2007
- Last appearance: 2026
- Highest placement: 6th: 2018
- Participation history: 2007; 2008; 2009; 2010 – 2014; 2015; 2016; 2017; 2018; 2019; ~~2020~~; 2021; 2022; 2023; 2024; 2025; 2026

External links
- ČT page
- Czech Republic's page at Eurovision.com
- For the most recent participation see Czech Republic in the Eurovision Song Contest 2026

The Czech Republic, presented as Czechia since 2023, has been represented at the Eurovision Song Contest 14 times since making its debut in 2007, participating two more times in 2008 and 2009 before maintaining an absence from 2010 to 2014. The country returned to the contest in 2015 and participated every year through to 2026. The Czech participating broadcaster is Czech Television (ČT).

The Czech Republic has qualified for the final six times, with two top ten finishes: Mikolas Josef's sixth place in 2018 and Vesna's tenth place in 2023. Other finalists included Gabriela Gunčíková, who finished 25th in 2016, Lake Malawi, who finished 11th in 2019, We Are Domi, who finished 22nd in 2022, and Daniel Žižka, who finished 16th in 2026.

== History ==
=== Before participation ===
During the existence of Czechoslovakia, Czechoslovak Television (ČST) is known to have broadcast a number of editions of the contest during the 1960s to the early 1990s. Karel Gott, one of the most popular Czechoslovak artists, represented Austria in the 1968 contest, held in London, United Kingdom. Furthermore, the Prague Theatre of Illuminated Drawings from the Czech capital performed as interval act in the 1984 contest, held in Luxembourg City, Luxembourg. Czechoslovakia was a member of EBU for a short time from 1991 until its dissolution in 1992. Afterwards, Slovakia immediately attempted to enter the contest independently in 1993, participating three times between 1994 and 1998 before withdrawing.

Czech broadcaster Czech Television (ČT) had also considered to enter the contest in 1993, however the planned entry failed to materialize. ČT later considered to send an entry to the 2005 contest, held in Kyiv, Ukraine. However, this once again did not materialise for various reasons. ČT again looked at sending an entry to the 2006 contest in Athens, Greece, but failed to do so after having doubts that the country would qualify for the final.

=== 2007–2009 ===
In April 2006, ČT confirmed that they would make their Eurovision debut at the 2007 contest. ČT held a national final to select the first Czech entry. Eurosong 2007 featured 10 songs, with the public voting for the winner through SMS voting. However one song was withdrawn before the show began, leaving only 9 songs to compete. The winner was rock band Kabát with the song "Malá dáma". At the contest's semi-final on 10 May 2007 the Czech Republic performed 16th in the semi-final, however only received one point (which came from Estonia) from the televoters around Europe.

For the 2008 contest, ČT again held a national final to select the entry for the country. 10 acts again competed for the chance to represent the Czech Republic in Serbia, with the winner of Eurosong 2008 being Tereza Kerndlová with "Have Some Fun". At the second semi-final of the contest, Kerndlová performed 8th in the running order, receiving 9 points for her performance (1 point from Turkey and Malta, 2 points from Croatia and 5 points from Macedonia), placing 18th of 19 entries, and failing once again to qualify the Czech Republic to the final.

Despite the two bottom two placements, ČT confirmed its participation in the 2009 contest and decided to hold an internal selection for the artist who would represent the country at the contest in Russia, with a public vote on the song they would sing. The broadcaster chose Romani band Gipsy.cz in January 2009 to compete in Moscow – the band had previously competed in the two previous national finals, coming both times in the top three. Two songs were presented to the Czech public to vote on: "Aven Romale" and "Do You Wanna". After 14 days of voting, "Aven Romale" emerged as the winner, which featured lead singer Radoslav Banga dressing-up as the superhero character Super Gypsy. The group performed second on the night of the first semi-final of the contest, held on 12 May 2009. However, the group managed to receive no points from the 20 countries voting in the semi-final, becoming the 16th entry to achieve this result since the current voting method was introduced in 1975.

On 22 July 2009, ČT announced that it would not take part in the 2010 contest, citing a lack of interest from the Czech public and poor viewing figures for the shows. The absence would last for another four years.

=== 2015–2026 ===
Despite a July 2014 statement by ČT that the Czech Republic would not participate in the 2015 contest in Vienna, Austria, ČT announced on 19 November 2014 that they would return to the contest in 2015, with a song to be chosen by an expert panel from a field of five specially commissioned nominees. "Hope Never Dies" by Marta Jandová and Václav Noid Bárta failed to qualify from the semi-final. However, it gave the Czech Republic their best result up to that point, placing 13th in the semi-final with 33 points. In 2016, the Czech Republic qualified to the final for the first time in the contest's history with "I Stand" by Gabriela Gunčíková, which went on to place 25th with 41 points, all from the juries. In 2017, Martina Bárta was internally selected to perform "My Turn", and finished 13th in her semi-final.

The Czech Republic returned to a national selection for the 2018 contest, deciding their contestant by a combined online vote and an international jury of former Eurovision competitors. The winner was "Lie to Me" by Mikolas Josef. During the first dress rehearsal for the first semi-final, Josef suffered a back injury, and was transferred to several hospitals and was temporarily unable to walk, but still promised to perform by the time of the semi-final. The choreography was adjusted to accommodate his injury, and his performance earned the Czech Republic their second appearance in the final. "Lie to Me" wound up placing fifteenth in the jury vote and fourth in the televote, resulting in an overall sixth place. This marked the Czech Republic's first ever top ten placement, and first time receiving televote points in the final. Following this, the Czech Head of Delegation Jan Bors confirmed that the national selection model would be used for future contests as a result of Josef's success.

A similar concept of the national final was used in 2019, deciding the entrant by a combination of an online voting of the Czech public and an international jury of former Eurovision competitors. Unlike the national selection for the 2018 contest, the results of the international voting public were added as one individual jury member. Placing second in the Czech public vote and joint first in the jury vote, "Friend of a Friend" by Lake Malawi emerged as the winner, thus earning the right to represent the Czech Republic in Tel Aviv. Lake Malawi managed to qualify, making it the third time the Czech Republic participated in a Eurovision final. They ended on eleventh place, the country's second-best result in the contest at the time.

During the press announcement of the 2019 entry, provisional plans for a televised national final for the 2020 contest were revealed, with the final being scheduled to occur on 25 January 2020. However, in November 2019, ČT announced that the televised national final had been cancelled, and that an online selection would again be used. The chosen entrant was Benny Cristo with "Kemama", and was supposed to perform in the second semi-final, but the 2020 contest was ultimately cancelled due to the COVID-19 pandemic. Instead, Cristo was kept as the Czech representative for the 2021 contest, with his entry, "Omaga", selected internally. Cristo participated in the second semi-final on 20 May 2021, performing 3rd, however, he failed to qualify for the final. It was later revealed that he had finished in 15th place with 23 points, all from the juries.

For the 2022 contest, ČT decided to return to using an online selection. Seven entries competed and the winning entry, "Lights Off" by We Are Domi, was determined by the combination of votes from a twelve-member international jury panel (50%), an international public vote (25%) and a Czech public vote (25%). Both international and Czech users were able to vote via the official Eurovision Song Contest app between 7 and 15 December 2021, and the winner was announced on 16 December 2021. We Are Domi performed in the second semi-final on 12 May 2022, and placed fourth with 227 points, thereby achieving the Czech Republic's fourth final appearance. They went on to finish in 22nd place with 38 points.

ČT continued using the ESCZ format for the 2023 contest, this time with a full online voting method split between 30% Czech voters and 70% international voters. Vesna and their song "My Sister's Crown" won the national final with 10,584 votes in total. The band performed in the first semi-final on 9 May 2023, placing fourth and qualifying Czechia for the final for the fifth time with 110 points. In the final on 13 May, they performed 14th and went on to finish in the top ten for the second time in the country's history, placing tenth with a combined score of 129 points.

The ESCZ format was continued for the 2024 contest. Aiko was ultimately selected to represent the Czech Republic in Malmö, Sweden, with the song "Pedestal". Performing in the second semi-final on 9 May 2024, the Czech Republic failed to qualify for the final, placing eleventh in a field of sixteen with 38 points, just 5 points away from qualification.

For the 2025 contest, ČT opted to internally select its entry. The selected entrant, Slovak singer Adonxs, was revealed on 11 December 2024, and his song "Kiss Kiss Goodbye" was presented on 7 March 2025. Performing in the second semi-final on 15 May 2025 in Basel, Switzerland, he failed to qualify for the final, placing 12th in a field of 16, scoring 29 points.

ČT again internally selected its entry for the 2026 contest in Vienna, from a pool of 260 submissions. The chosen entrant was Daniel Žižka with the song "Crossroads", which was released on 11 March. Performing in the second semi-final on 14 May 2026, Žižka qualified the Czech Republic for the final, marking the country's sixth qualification. In the final on 16 May, Žižka performed 11th and went on to finish in 16th place, scoring 113 points. His performance in the final was affected by several technical issues, and although the Czech delegation submitted a request to perform again, they were denied.

On 6 October 2026, ČT announced it would not take part in the 2027 contest in Burgas, Bulgaria, citing budget cuts at the broadcaster.

== Participation overview ==
Table key
2	Second place
3	Third place
◁	Last place
◇	Entry selected but did not compete

Year	Artist	Song	Language	Final	Points	Semi	Points
2007	Kabát	"Malá dáma"	Czech	Failed to qualify		28 ◁	1
2008	Tereza Kerndlová	"Have Some Fun"	English	Failed to qualify		18	9
2009	Gipsy.cz	"Aven Romale"	English, Romani	Failed to qualify		18 ◁	0
2015	Marta Jandová and Václav Noid Bárta	"Hope Never Dies"	English	Failed to qualify		13	33
2016	Gabriela Gunčíková	"I Stand"	English	25	41	9	161
2017	Martina Bárta	"My Turn"	English	Failed to qualify		13	83
2018	Mikolas Josef	"Lie to Me"	English	6	281	3	232
2019	Lake Malawi	"Friend of a Friend"	English	11	157	2	242
2020	Benny Cristo ◇	"Kemama" ◇	English ◇	Contest cancelled (Note: The 2020 contest was cancelled due to the COVID-19 pandemic.)			
2021	Benny Cristo	"Omaga"	English	Failed to qualify		15	23
2022	We Are Domi	"Lights Off"	English	22	38	4	227
2023	Vesna	"My Sister's Crown"	English, Czech, Ukrainian, Bulgarian	10	129	4	110
2024	Aiko	"Pedestal"	English	Failed to qualify		11	38
2025	Adonxs	"Kiss Kiss Goodbye"	English	Failed to qualify		12	29
2026	Daniel Žižka	"Crossroads"	English	16	113	9	142

== Related involvement ==
=== Heads of delegation ===
The public broadcaster of each participating country in the Eurovision Song Contest assigns a head of delegation as the EBU's contact person and the leader of their delegation at the event. The delegation, whose size can greatly vary, includes a head of press, the contestants, songwriters, composers and backing vocalists, among others.

Year	Head of delegation	Ref.
2015	Radim Smetana	
2016–2019	Jan Bors	
2020	Cyril Hirsch	
2021–2026	Kryštof Šámal	

=== Commentators and spokespersons ===
For the show's broadcast on ČT, various commentators have provided commentary on the contest in the Czech language. At the Eurovision Song Contest after all points are calculated, the presenters of the show call upon each voting country to invite each respective spokesperson to announce the results of their vote on-screen.

Year	Channel	Commentator(s)	Spokesperson	Ref.
1965	ČST	Unknown	Did not participate	
1966	ČST	Vladimír Dvořák	Did not participate	
1967	ČST	Vladimír Dvořák	Did not participate	
1968	ČST	Miroslav Horníček	Did not participate	
1969	ČST	Unknown	Did not participate	
1970	I. program	Vladimír Dvořák and Ivan Úradníček	Did not participate	
1971	I. program, II. program	Ivan Úradníček	Did not participate	
1972	I. program, II. program	Blažena Kočtúchová	Did not participate	
1973	II. program	J. Šrámek	Did not participate	
1974–1975	No broadcast		Did not participate	
1976	II. program	Unknown	Did not participate	
1977	II. program	Unknown	Did not participate	
1978–1980	No broadcast		Did not participate	
1981	II. program	Unknown	Did not participate	
1982	I. program	Unknown	Did not participate	
1983	II. program	Unknown	Did not participate	
1984	II. program	Unknown	Did not participate	
1985	II. program	Unknown	Did not participate	
1986	II. program	Unknown	Did not participate	
1987	II. program	Unknown	Did not participate	
1988	II. program	Unknown	Did not participate	
1989	I. program	Unknown	Did not participate	
1990	II. program	Unknown	Did not participate	
1991	ČTV	Unknown	Did not participate	
1992	F1	Unknown	Did not participate	
1993–2005	No broadcast		Did not participate	
2006	ČT2 (final) (Note: Delayed broadcast in a shortened format on 29 April 2007 at 02:00 CEST (00:00 UTC).)	Kateřina Kristelová	Did not participate	
2007	ČT1	Kateřina Kristelová (all shows); Josef Vojtek (final)	Andrea Savane	
2008	ČT1 (SF2, final); ČT2 (SF1)	Kateřina Kristelová	Petra Šubrtová	
2009	ČT1 (SF1, final); ČT2 (SF2)	Jan Rejžek	Petra Šubrtová	
2010–2014	No broadcast		Did not participate	
2015	ČT art (semi-finals); ČT1 (final)	Aleš Háma	Daniela Písařovicová	
2016	ČT2 (semi-finals); ČT1 (final)	Libor Bouček	Daniela Písařovicová	
2017	ČT2 (semi-finals); ČT1 (final)	Libor Bouček	Radka Rosická	
2018	ČT2 (semi-finals); ČT1 (final)	Libor Bouček	Radka Rosická	
2019	ČT2 (semi-finals); ČT1 (final)	Libor Bouček	Radka Rosická	
2021	ČT2 (semi-finals); ČT1 (final)	Jan Maxián and Albert Černý	Taťána Kuchařová	
2022	ČT2	Jan Maxián	Taťána Kuchařová	
2023	ČT2	Jan Maxián	Radka Rosická	
2024	ČT2	Vašek Matějovský, Patricie Kaňok Fuxová and Dominika Hašková	Radka Rosická	
2025	ČT1	Ondřej Cikán (all shows); Aiko (final)	Radka Rosická	
2026	ČT2 (semi-finals); ČT1 (final)	Ondřej Cikán	Dominika Hašková	

== Photo gallery ==
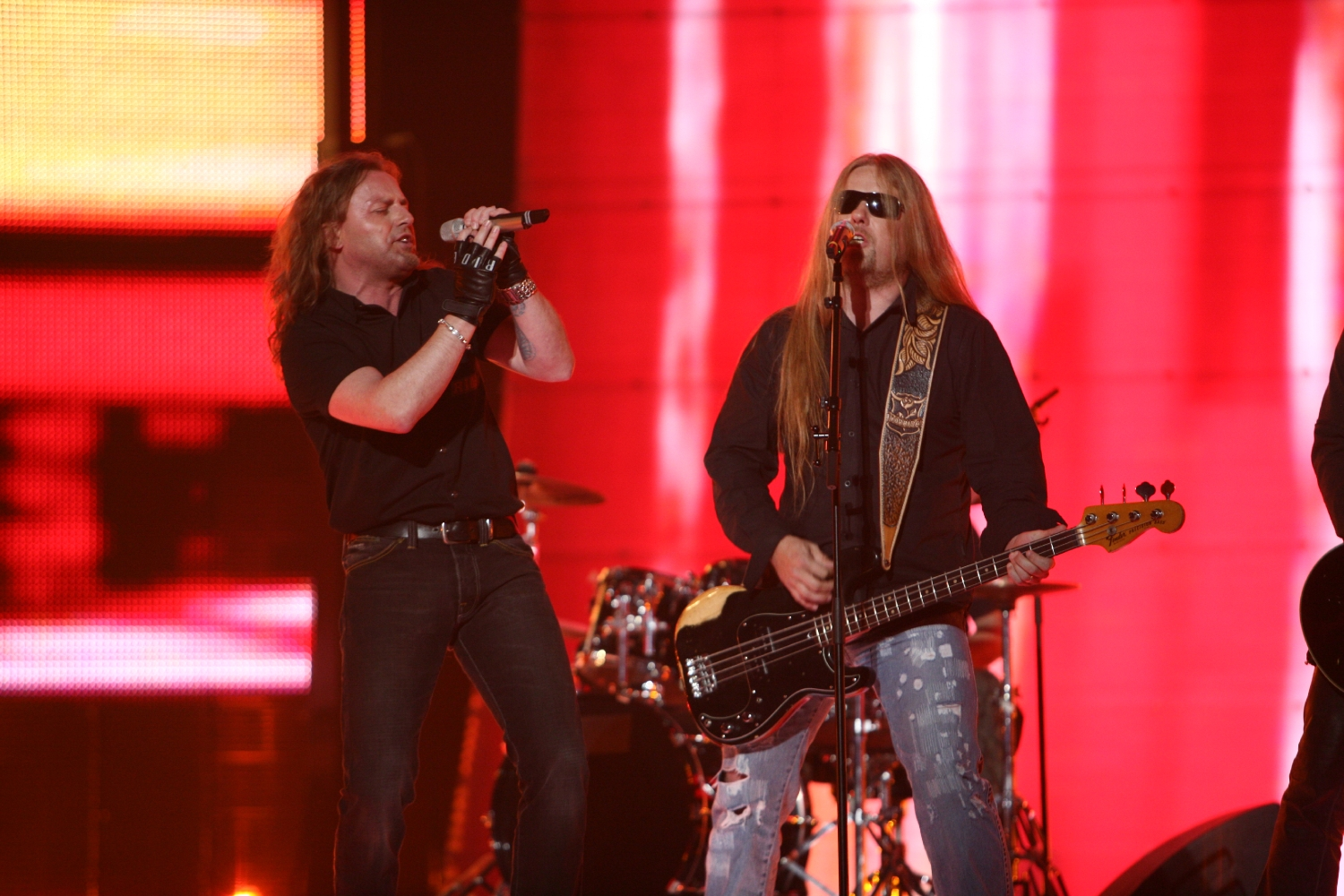
Kabát in Helsinki (2007)

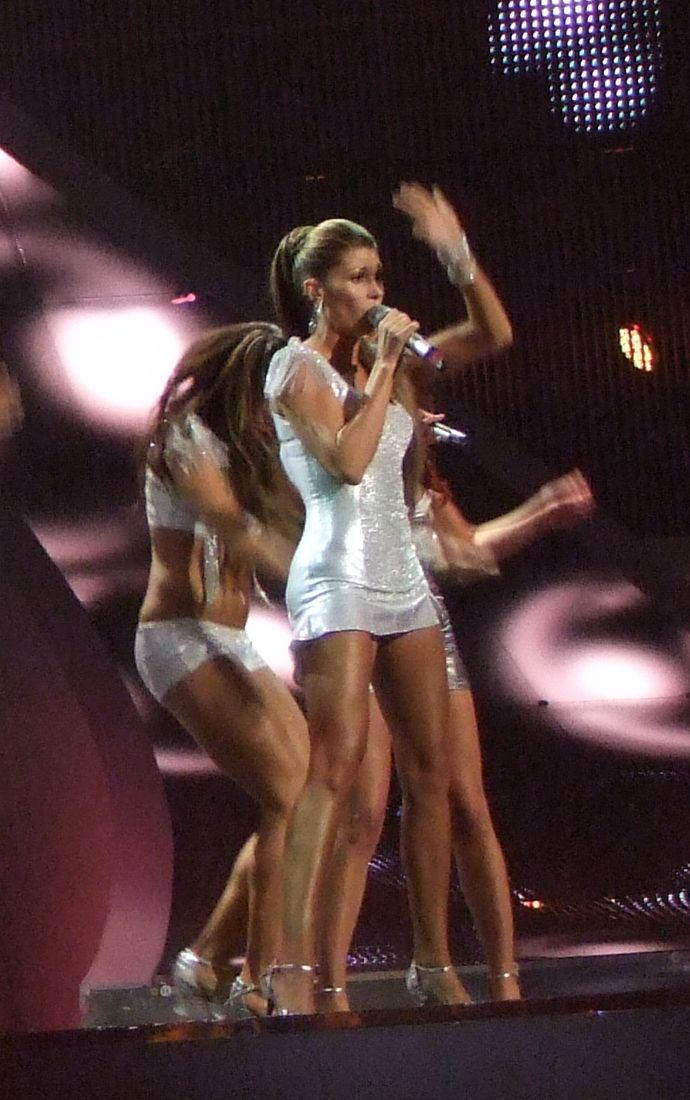
Tereza Kerndlová in Belgrade (2008)

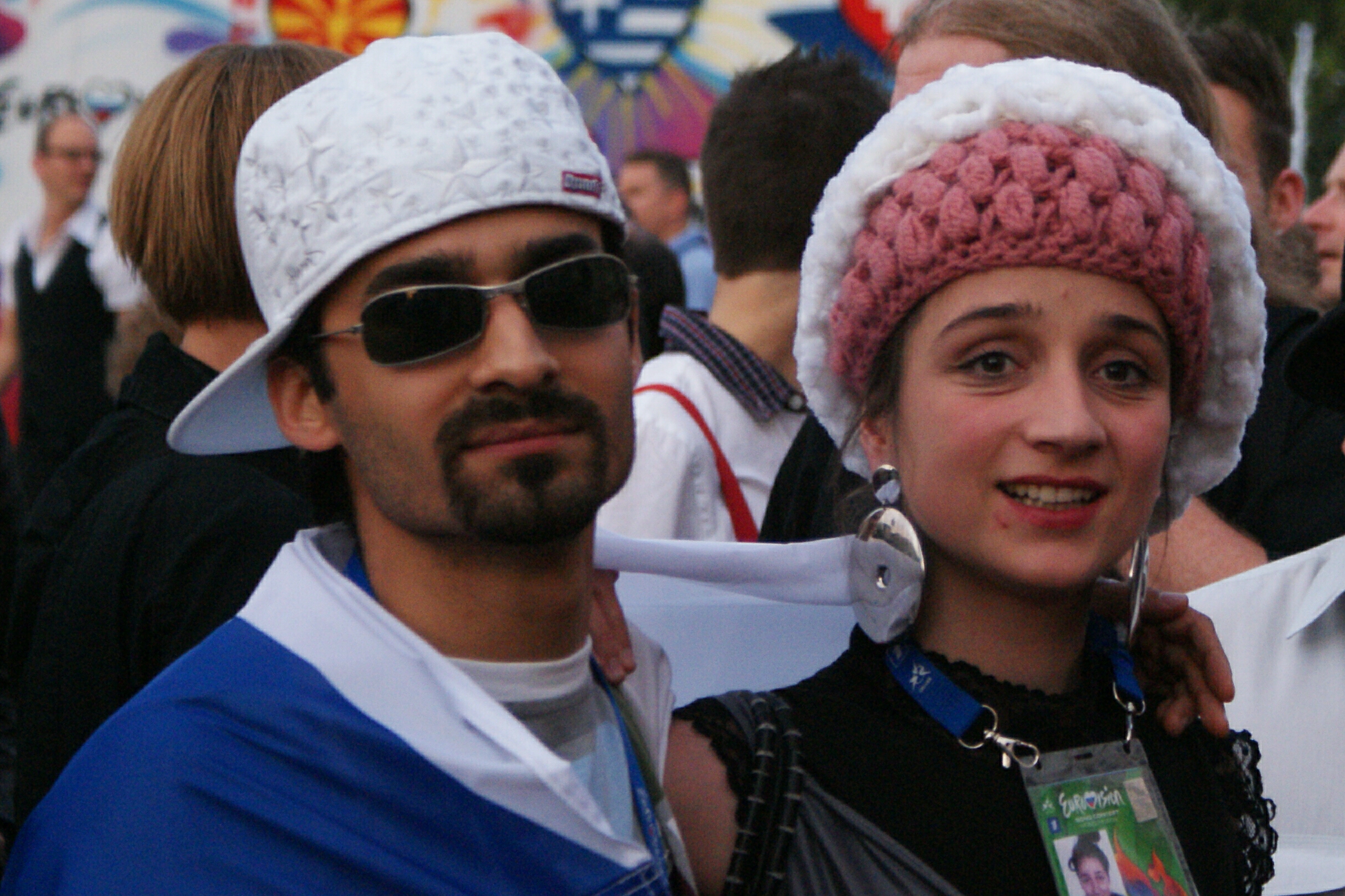
Gipsy.cz in Moscow (2009)

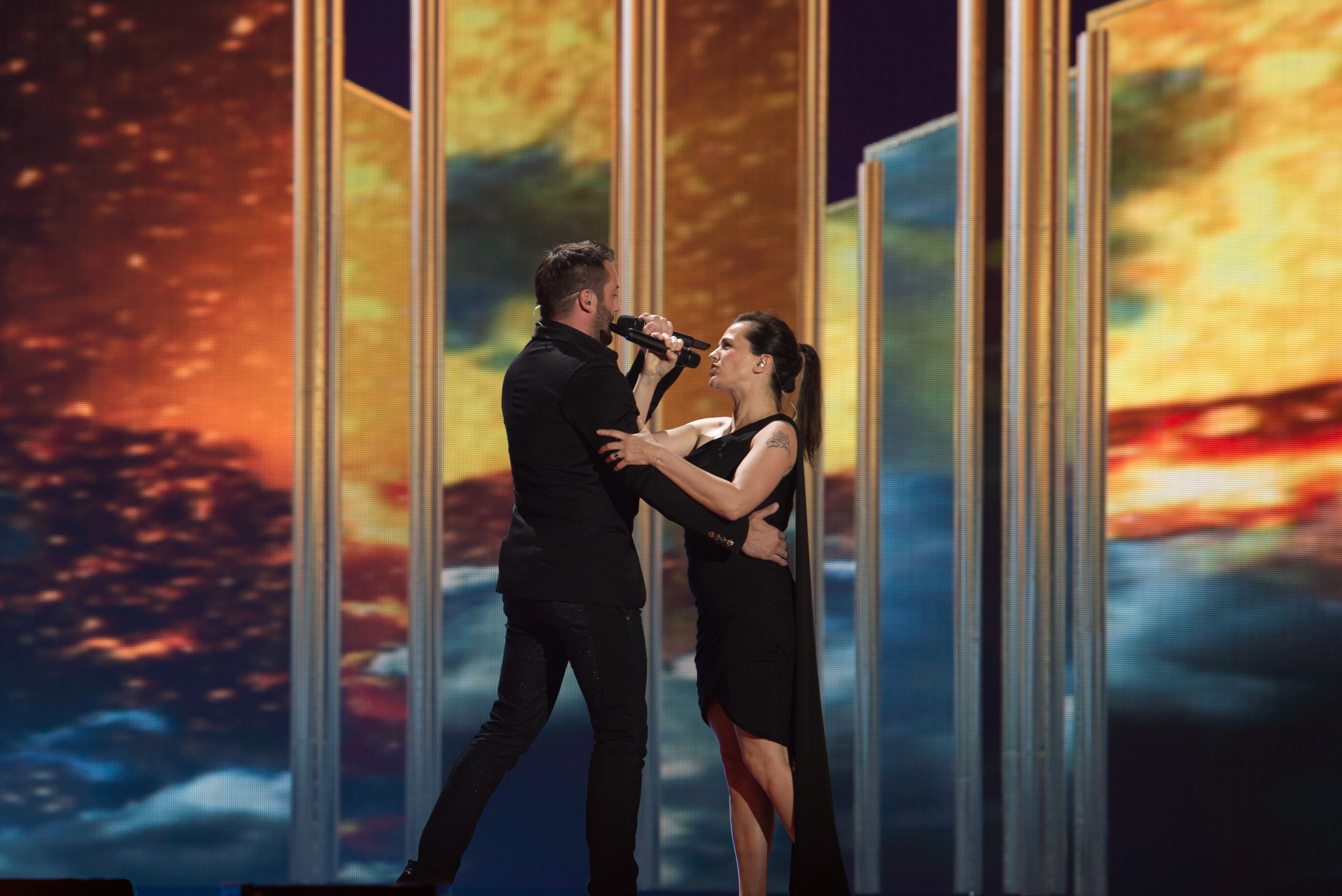
Marta Jandová and Václav Noid Bárta in Vienna (2015)

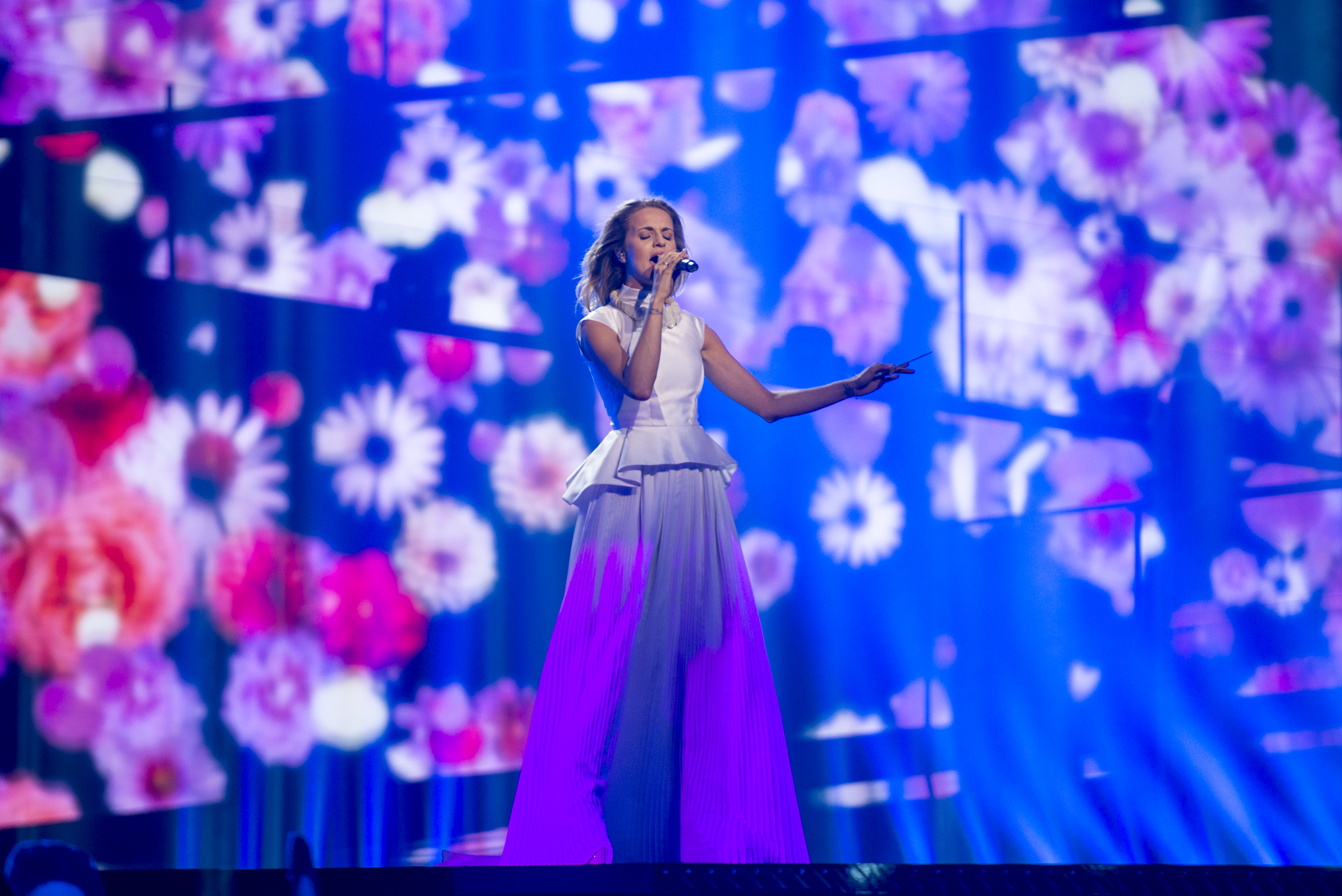
Gabriela Gunčíková in Stockholm (2016)

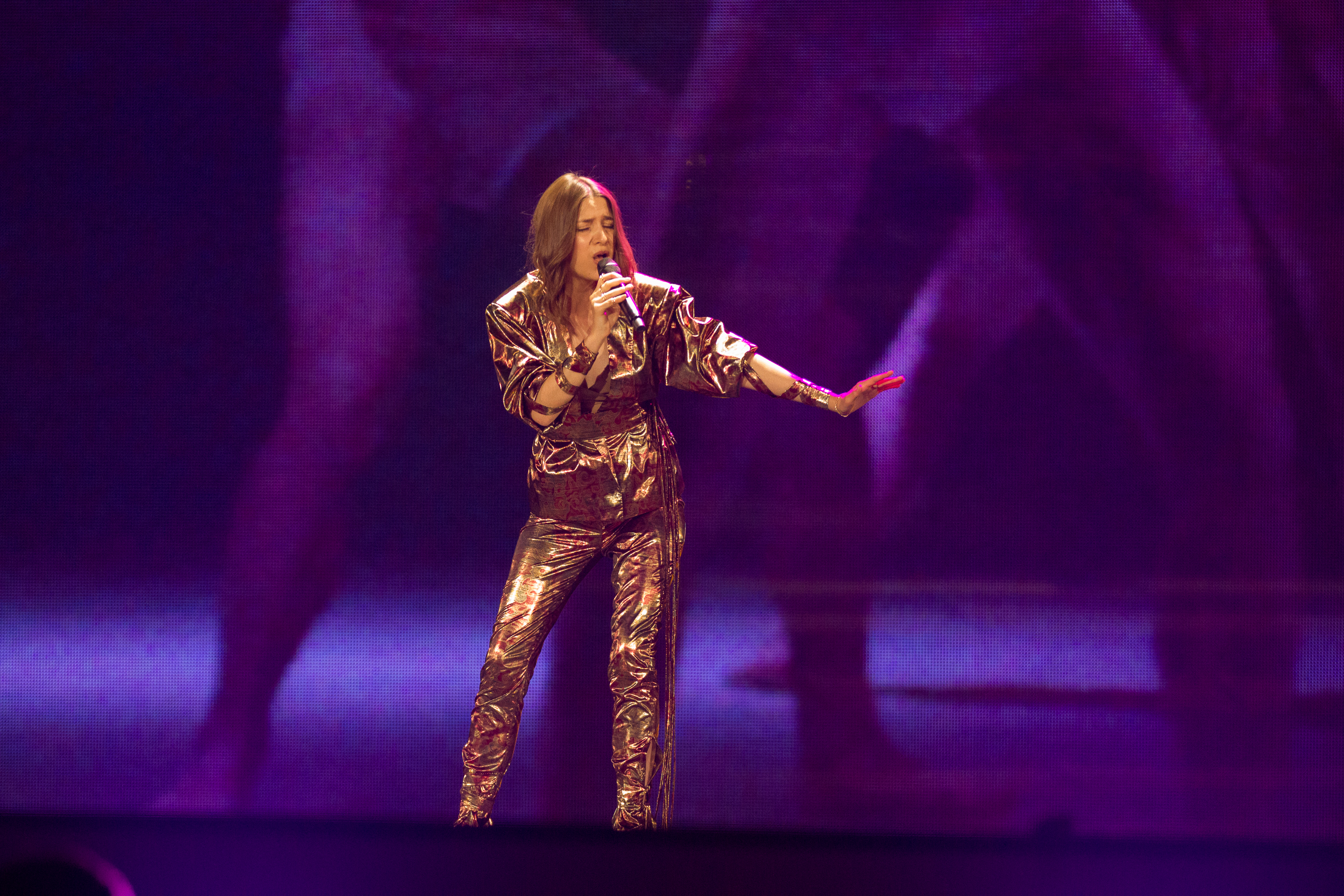
Martina Bárta in Kyiv (2017)

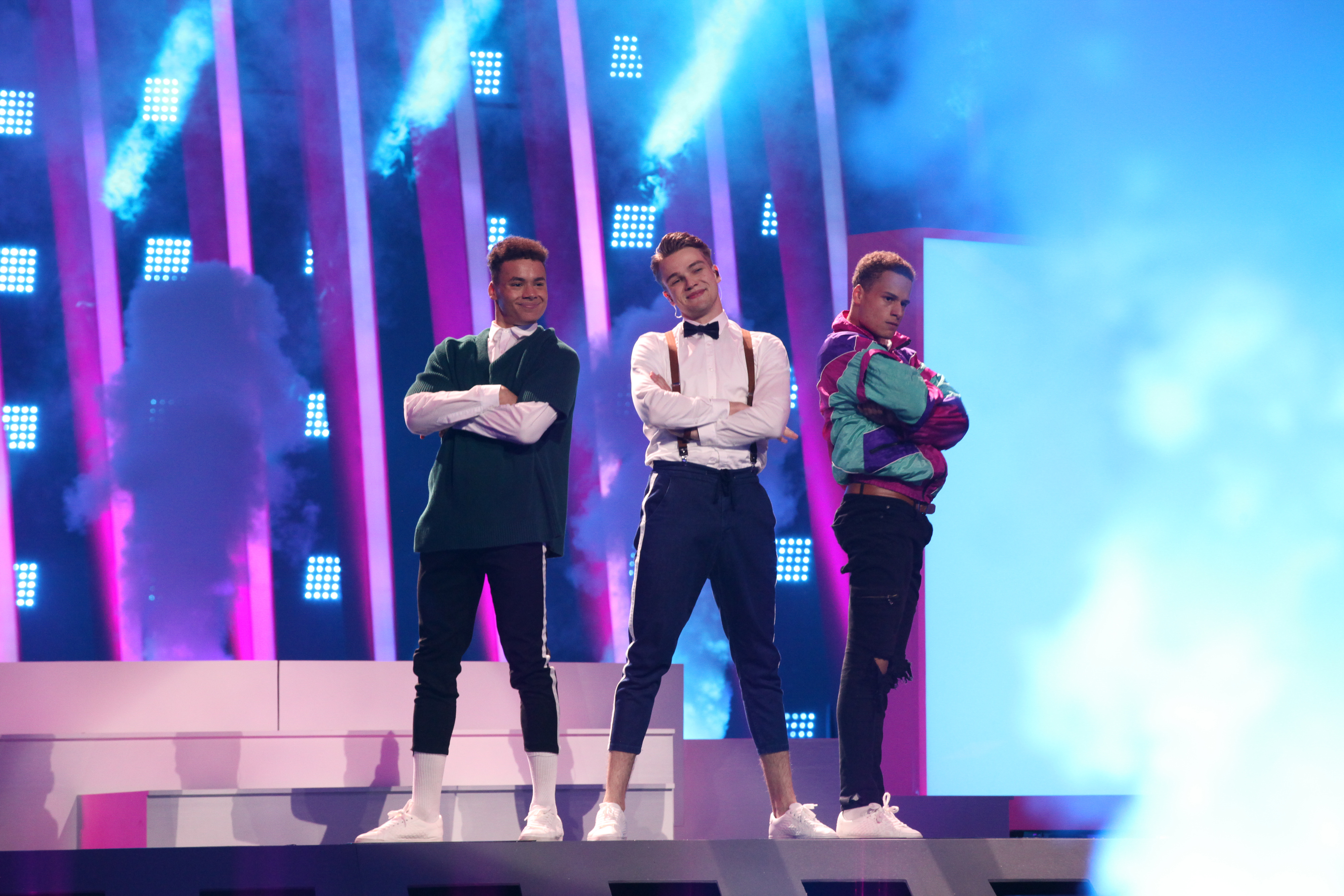
Mikolas Josef in Lisbon (2018)

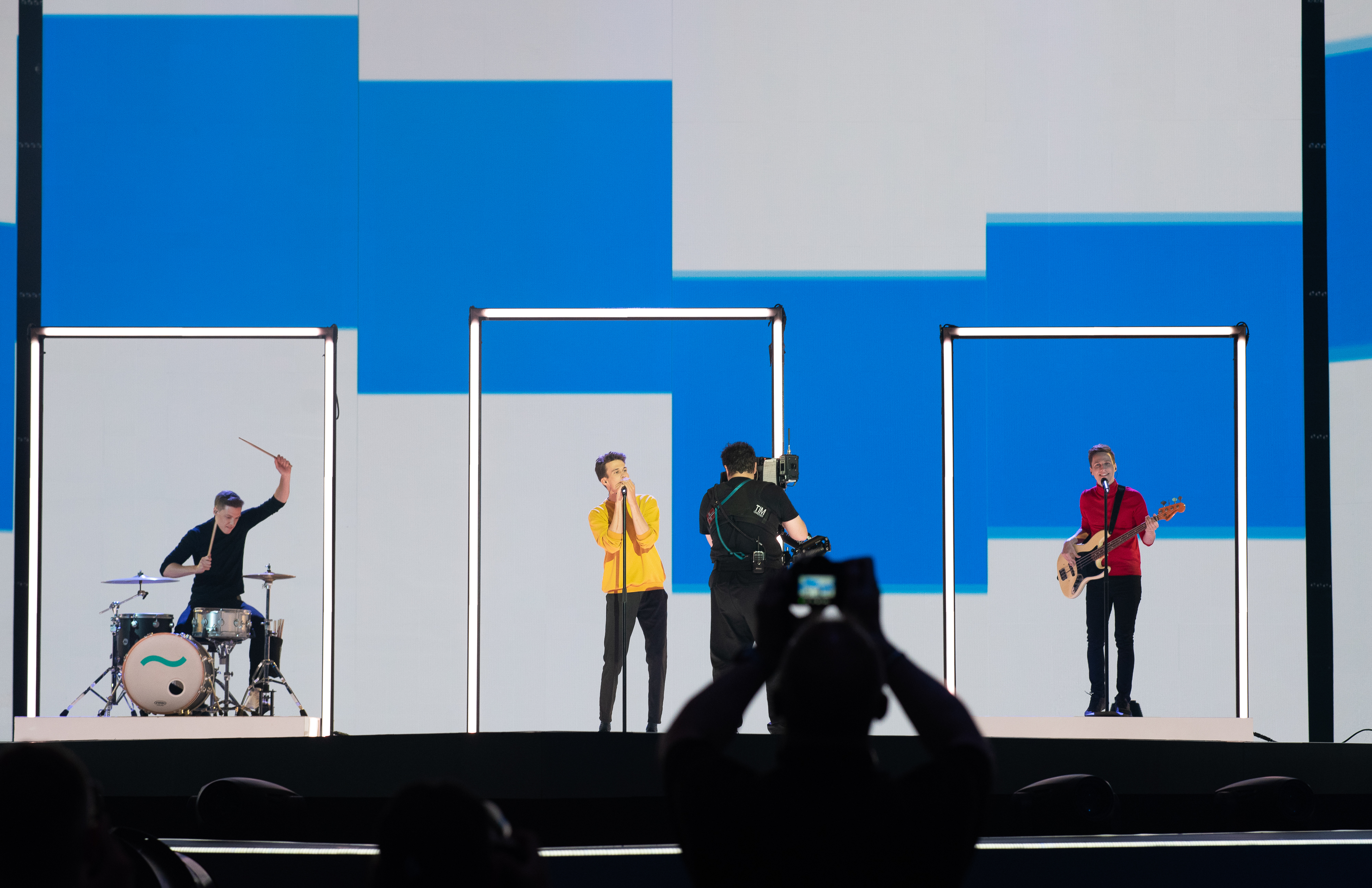
Lake Malawi in Tel Aviv (2019)

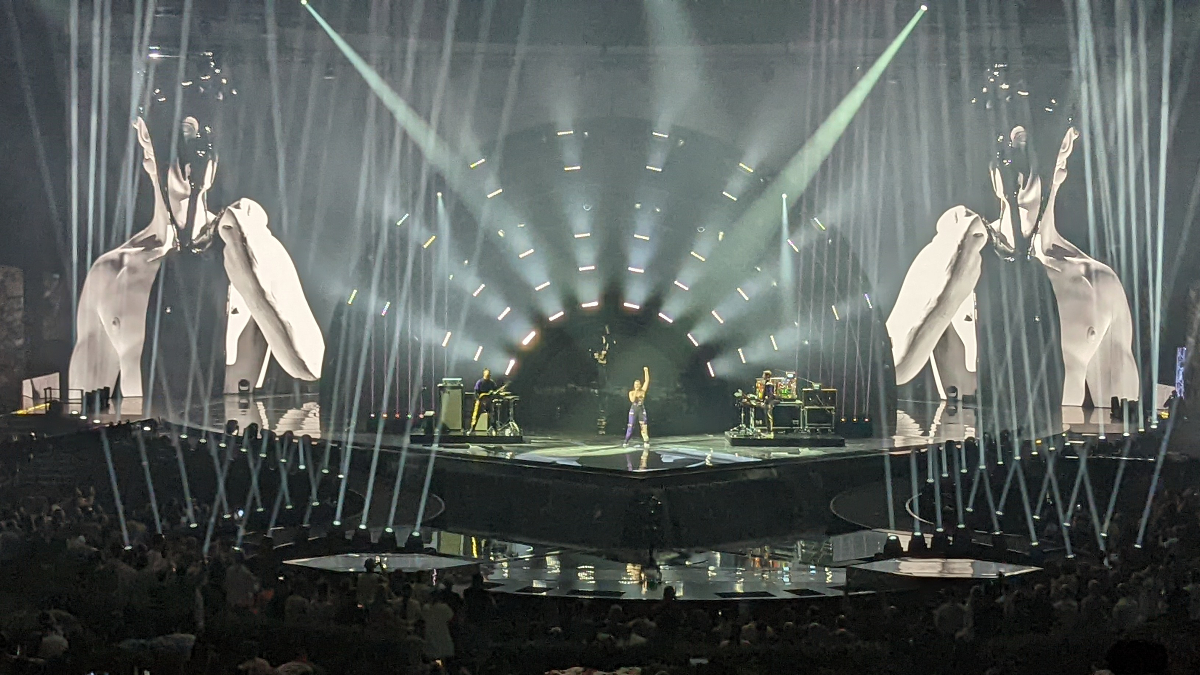
We Are Domi in Turin (2022)

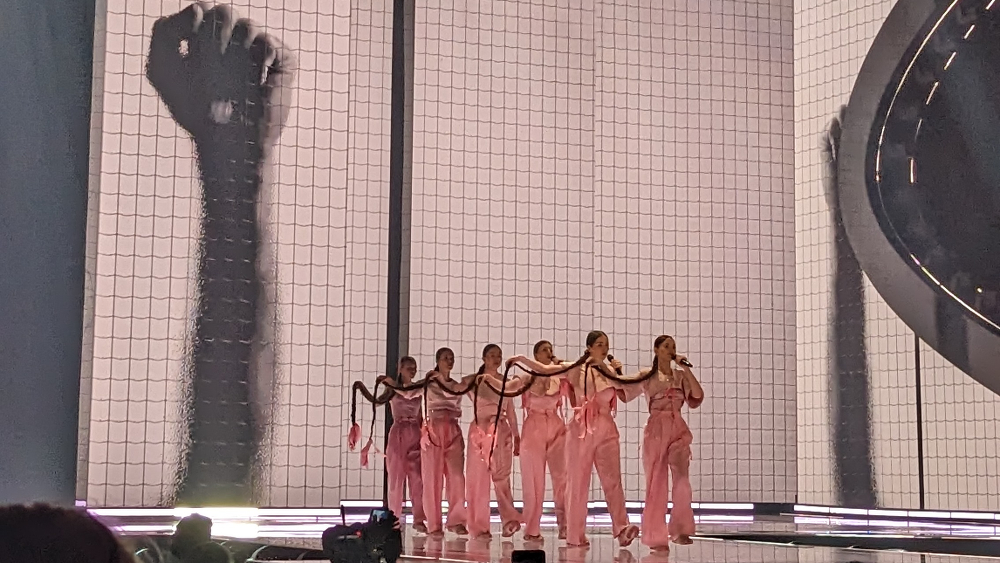
Vesna in Liverpool (2023)

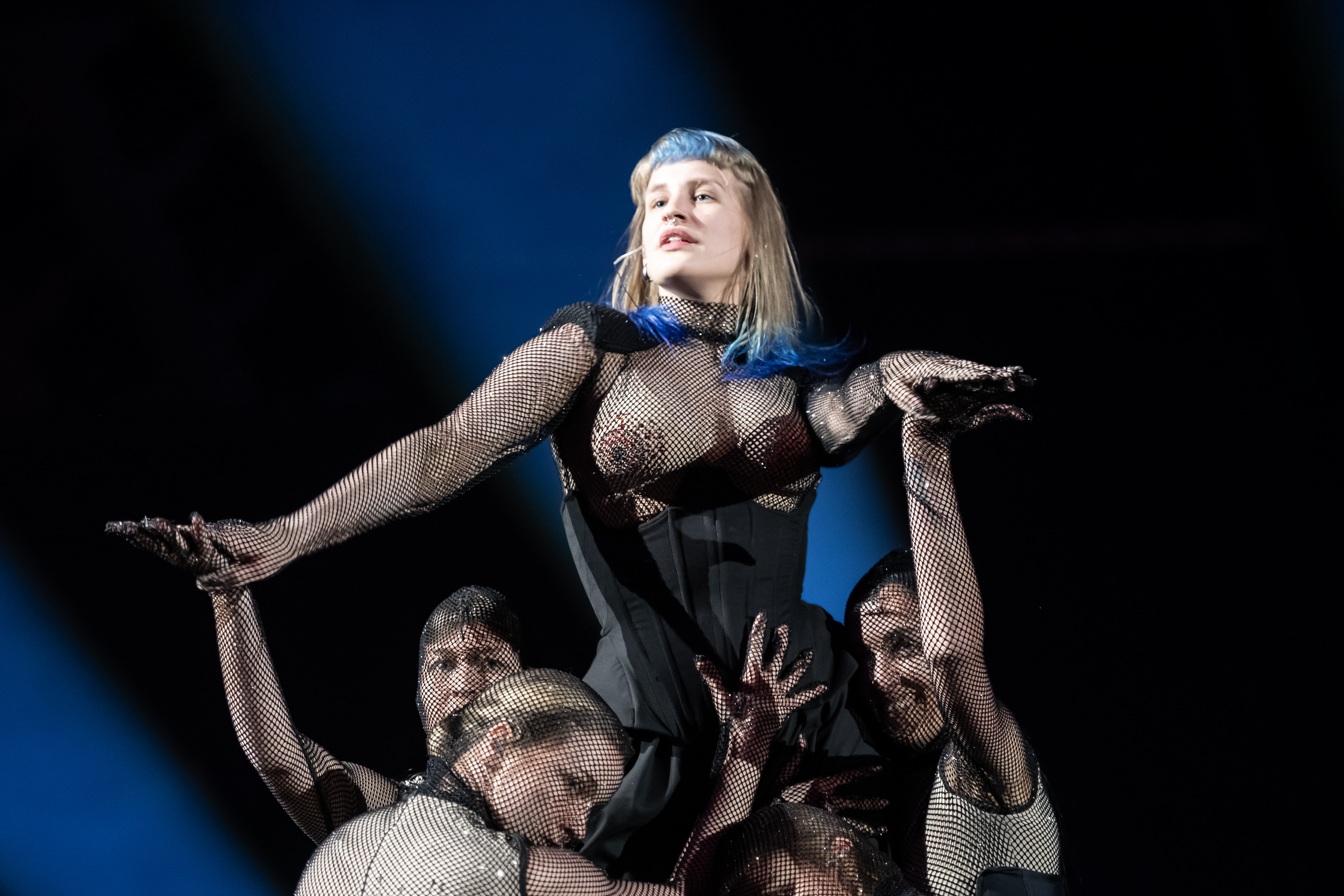
Aiko in Malmö (2024)

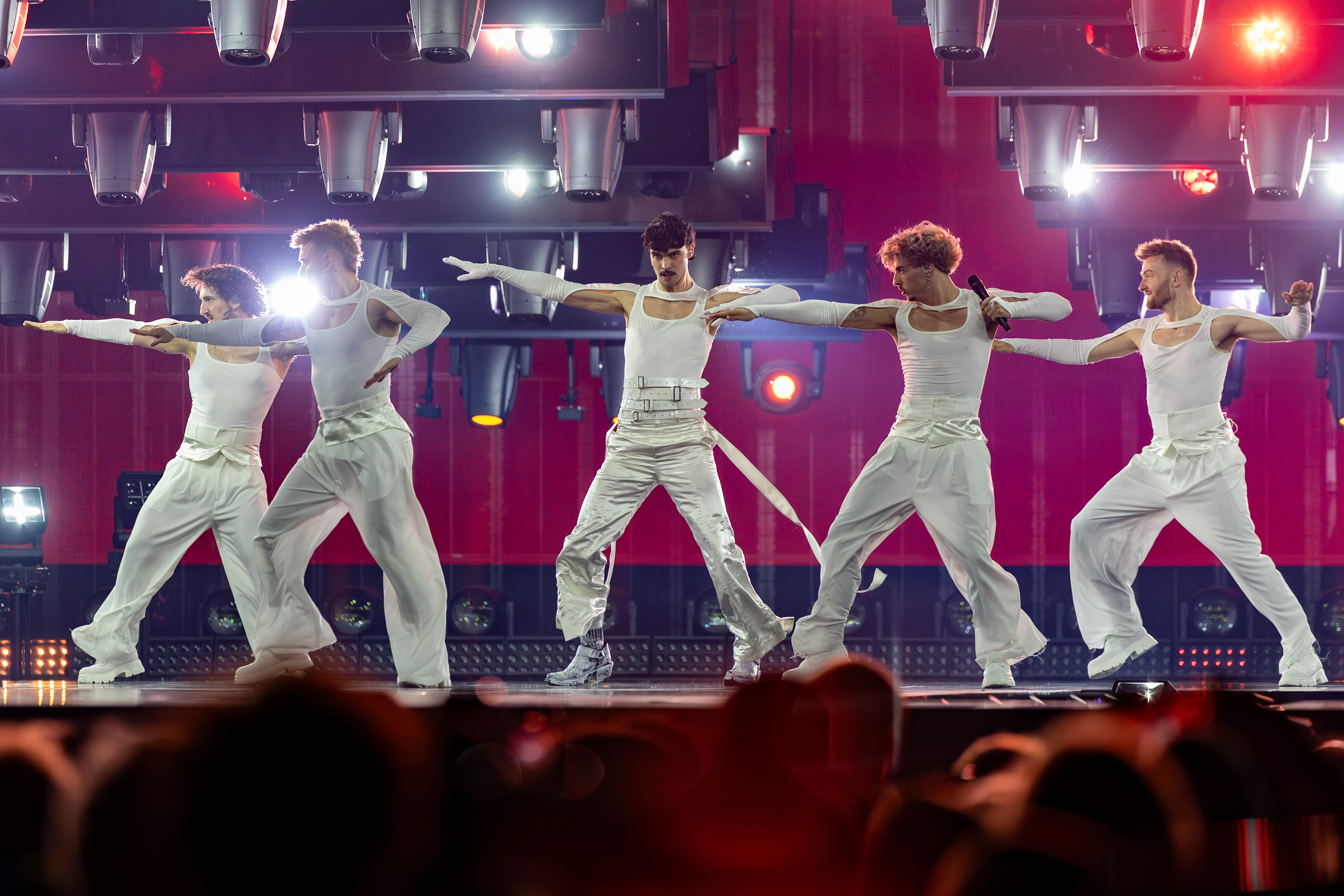
Adonxs in Basel (2025)

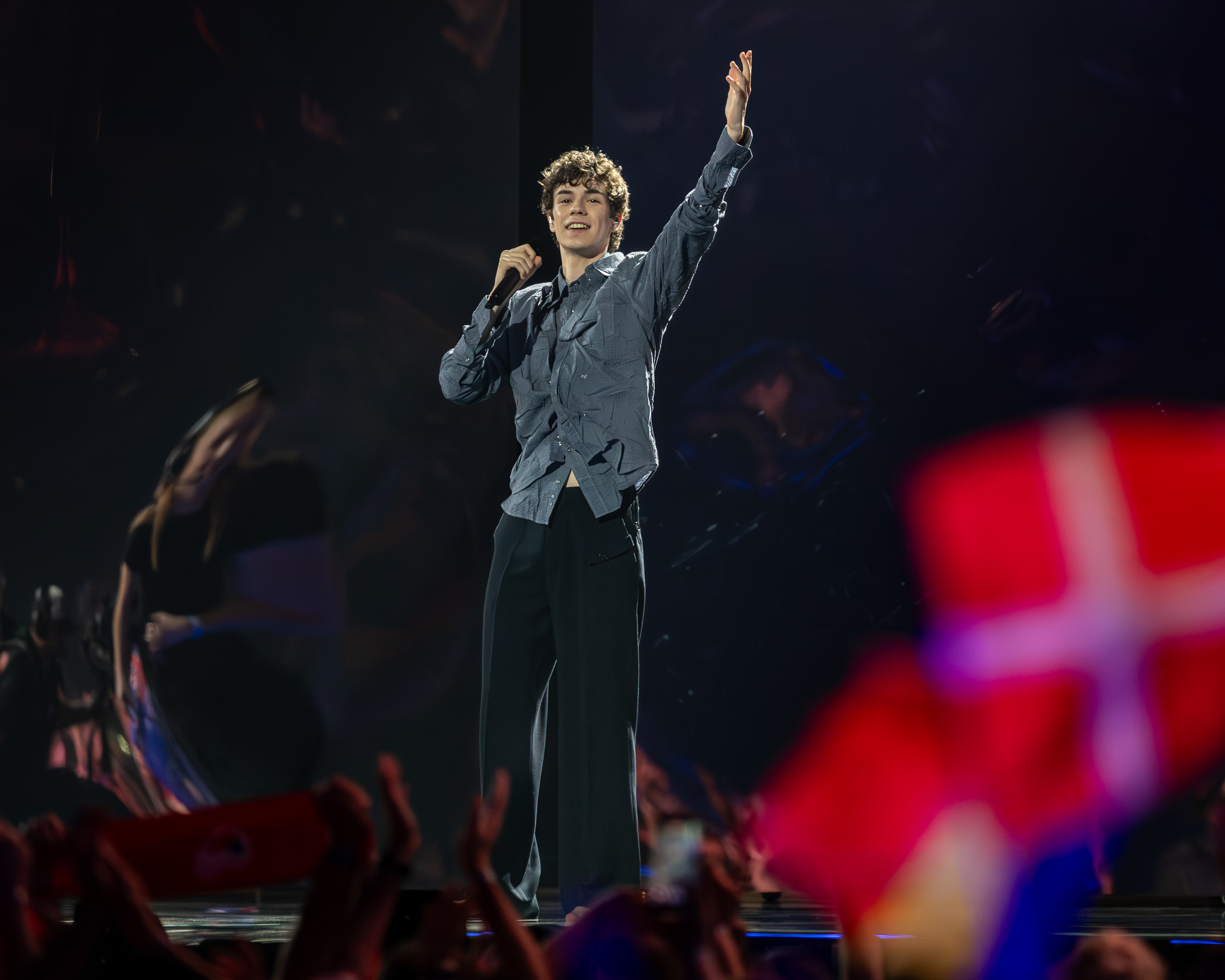
Daniel Žižka in Vienna (2026)

== See also ==
- Czech Republic in the Eurovision Young Musicians
- Czech Republic in the Eurovision Young Dancers
