= Stuck in the 80's =

"Stuck In the 80's"

Single by Lake Malawi
- Released: 16 November 2019
- Length: 3:21
- Label: Holidays Forever
- Songwriter(s): Albert Černý; Dominic Buczkowski-Wojtaszek; Koos Kamerling

Lake Malawi singles chronology
"Friend of a Friend" (2019)	"Stuck In the 80's" (2019)	"Lucy" (2020)

"Stuck In the 80's" is a song by Czech indie pop band Lake Malawi. It was released as a Digital download on 16 November 2019 by Holidays Forever. It's the first single released by the band since they represented the Czech Republic in the 2019 edition of the Eurovision Song Contest with the song "Friend of a Friend". The song has peaked at number 85 on the Czech Republic Rádio – Top 100 Chart.

== Critical reception ==
Connor Terry from ESCUnited gave the song a positive review stating, "The Indie-pop group have released their first single since May, and it's titled "Stuck in the 80's". The track sticks to the band's distinct 80's synth-pop sound, and a driving bass beat from member Jeroným. There are also many nods to 80's technology throughout the music video such as camcorders, karaoke machine, PlayStation console, and alarm clock. If you were a fan of “Friend of a Friend”, then this is just up your alley."

== Music video ==
A music video to accompany the release of "Stuck In the 80's" was first released onto YouTube on 13 November 2019. The music video was directed by Ondřej Urbanec.

== Charts ==
Chart (2019)	Peak position
Czech Republic (Rádio – Top 100)	85

== Release history ==
Region	Date	Format	Label
Czech Republic	16 November 2019	Digital download; streaming	Holidays Forever
