= Carloff =

Carloff is a surname. Notable people known by this name include the following:

== Surname ==
- Boris Carloff, whose birthname was Milan Havrda (born 1974), Czech musician, composer and record producer
- Hendrik Carloff (?? – after 1677), adventurer

== See also ==
- Karloff (name)
