= Pam Rabbit =

Czech singer-songwriter (born 1997)

- Pam Rabbit in 2025

Background information
- Also known as: Pamela Koky
- Born: Pamela Narimanian; 5 October 1997 (age 29); Prague, Czech Republic
- Genre: Indie pop
- Occupation: Singer-songwriter
- Instrument: Vocals
- Years active: 2015–present
- Label: Universal
- Formerly of: Prague Lounge Trio
- Award: Anděl Award – Female Singer of the Year (2023)
- Website: pamrabbit.com

Pamela Narimanian (born on 5 October 1997), better known by her stage name Pam Rabbit, is a Czech singer-songwriter of Armenian origin, born in Prague. She sings in Czech and English. In 2023, she won the Anděl Award for Female Singer of the Year. She has released one studio album, two EPs, and several singles.

== Biography ==
=== Early life ===
Pamela Narimanian, whose background is Armenian, was introduced to music through her grandfather, who was a Georgian singer. She studied at the Jaroslav Ježek Conservatory and performed as a singer and dancer at parties.

=== Career ===
Under her stage name Pam Rabbit, Narimanian began her musical career as a backup singer for Mikolas Josef, including at the 2018 Eurovision Song Contest in Portugal. A year later, she competed to enter the Czech Republic in the same event, with her single "Easy to Believe". In 2020, she competed once more, this time with the song "Get Up", though the event was ultimately cancelled due to the COVID-19 pandemic. She also performed with the Prague Lounge Trio.

In 2022, she released her debut EP, Mom, I'm Lost, which included songs in both Czech and English as well as a collaboration with Ben Cristovao. Her first full-length album, I Love the Internet, followed in 2023, and she presented it with her first headlining concert, at the Lucerna Music Bar in Prague. The record won her the Anděl Award for Female Singer of the Year. She promoted it by supporting Mirai on tour the following year. In 2024, she issued a deluxe edition of I Love the Internet and was later nominated as Breakthrough Artist of the Year at the Český slavík awards. That year, she contributed the song "Společně sami" to the Gaby Sittová film of the same name. In 2026, Pam Rabbit released the EP Planet 33, which includes a collaboration with Ewa Farna.

She has additionally worked with such artists as Slza, Boris Carloff, and John Wolfhooker.

=== Personal life ===
Narimanian is vegan.

== Discography ==
Studio albums

- I Love the Internet (2023)

EPs

- Mom, I'm Lost (2022)
- Planet 33 (2026)
