= Karloff (name) =

Karloff is a name that is used as a professional name. Notable people who use this name include the following:

- Boris Karloff, whose birthname was William Henry Pratt (1887–1969), English actor
- Karloff Lagarde, stage name of Carlos Delucio Lagarde, uncle of Karloff Lagarde Jr. (1928–2007), Mexican Luchador
- Karloff Lagarde Jr., stage name of César Baltazar de Lucio Valencia, nephew of Karloff Lagarde (born 1970), Mexican Luchador

== See also ==
- Carloff
