= Surrounded by Light =

Studio album by Lake Malawi
- Released: 10 November 2017
- Recorded: 2016
- Label: Holidays Forever

Lake Malawi chronology
| We Are Making Love Again (2015) | Surrounded by Light (2017) | The Great Video Game Crush (2022) |

Singles from Surrounded by Light
- 1. "Prague (In the City)" Released: 25 January 2017; 2. "Surrounded by Light" Released: 20 April 2017; 3. "Bottom of the Jungle" Released: 8 September 2017; 4. "Paris" Released: 9 November 2017; 5. "Spaced Out" Released: 23 March 2018

Surrounded by Light is the debut studio album by the Czech indie pop band Lake Malawi. It was released on 10 November 2017 by Holidays Forever. The album peaked at number 81 on the Czech Albums Chart. The album includes the singles "Prague (In the City)", "Surrounded by Light", "Bottom of the Jungle", "Paris" and "Spaced Out".

== Singles ==
"Prague (In the City)" was released as the lead single from the album on 25 January 2017. "Surrounded by Light" was released as the second single from the album on 20 April 2017. "Bottom of the Jungle" was released as the third single from the album on 8 September 2017. "Paris" was released as the fourth single from the album on 9 November 2017. "Spaced Out" was released as the fifth single from the album on 23 March 2018.

== Track listing ==
| No. | Title | Length |
|---|---|---|
| 1. | "Holidays Forever" | 4:46 |
| 2. | "Spaced Out" | 3:47 |
| 3. | "Because Because" | 3:40 |
| 4. | "Giving Up on Love" | 3:28 |
| 5. | "Black Pearl" | 3:24 |
| 6. | "Prague (In the City)" | 3:07 |
| 7. | "Parallel Universe" | 4:08 |
| 8. | "Surrounded by Light" | 3:14 |
| 9. | "Beach, Nectarines & Daim" | 2:43 |
| 10. | "Bottom of the Jungle" | 3:11 |
| 11. | "Nyc" | 4:39 |
| 12. | "Pyramid" | 2:57 |
| 13. | "Paris" | 3:26 |
| 14. | "Maryland" | 2:39 |

== Charts ==
| Chart (2017) | Peak position |
|---|---|
| Czech Albums (ČNS IFPI) | 81 |

== Release history ==
| Region | Date | Format | Label |
|---|---|---|---|
| Czech Republic | 10 November 2017 | Digital download | Holidays Forever |
