= Omaga =

2021 song by Benny Cristo

Single by Benny Cristo
- Released: 16 February 2021
- Genre: Dance
- Length: 2:59
- Label: Championship Music
- Songwriter: Ben Cristovao
- Producer: Filip Vlček

Benny Cristo singles chronology
"Ledová" (2021)	"Omaga" (2021)

Music video
- "Omaga" on YouTube

Eurovision Song Contest 2021 entry
- Country: Czech Republic
- Artist: Benny Cristo
- Composers: Filip Vlček; Ben Cristovao
- Lyricist: Ben Cristovao

Finals performance
- Semi-final result: 15th
- Semi-final points: 23

Entry chronology
- ◄ "Kemama" (2020)
- "Lights Off" (2022) ►

"Omaga" (stylized in all lowercase) is a song by Czech singer Benny Cristo. It represented the Czech Republic in the Eurovision Song Contest 2021 in Rotterdam, the Netherlands. Much like its predecessor "Kemama" being a shorthand for "OK, Mama", the title "Omaga" is a shorthand for "Oh My God". The music video contains references to The Simpsons, Grease, The Shining, Pulp Fiction, Forrest Gump and Dirty Dancing, amongst others.

== Eurovision Song Contest ==
The song was selected to represent Czech Republic in the Eurovision Song Contest 2021 in February after Benny Cristo was internally selected by the national broadcaster Czech Television. The semi-finals of the contest featured the same line-up of countries as determined by the draw for the 2020 contest's semi-finals. On 20 May 2021, Czech Republic was placed into the second semi-final and performed in the first half of the show.
