= Czech Republic in the Eurovision Song Contest 2019 =

- Eurovision Song Contest 2019
- Participating broadcaster: Czech Television (ČT)
- Country: Czech Republic
- Selection process: Eurovision Song CZ 2019
- Selection date: 28 January 2019

Competing entry
- Song: "Friend of a Friend"
- Artist: Lake Malawi
- Songwriters: Jan Steinsdoerfer; Mikołaj Trybulec; Albert Černý

Placement
- Semi-final result: Qualified (2nd, 242 points)
- Final result: 11th, 157 points

Participation chronology

The Czech Republic was represented at the Eurovision Song Contest 2019 with the song "Friend of a Friend", written by Jan Steinsdoerfer, Mikołaj Trybulec, and Albert Černý, and performed by the band Lake Malawi. The Czech participating broadcaster, Česká televize (ČT), organised the national final Eurovision Song CZ 2019 in order to select its entry for the contest. Eight entries competed in the national final and "Friend of a Friend" performed by Lake Malawi was announced as the winner on 28 January 2019 following the combination of votes from an eleven-member international jury panel and a public vote.

Czech Republic was drawn to compete in the first semi-final of the Eurovision Song Contest which took place on 14 May 2019. Performing during the show in position 6, "Friend of a Friend" was announced among the top 10 entries of the first semi-final and therefore qualified to compete in the final on 16 May. It was later revealed that Czech Republic placed second out of the 17 participating countries in the semi-final with 242 points. In the final, Czech Republic performed in position 3 and placed eleventh out of the 26 participating countries, scoring 157 points.

== Background ==
Prior to the 2019 contest, Česká televize (ČT) had participated in the Eurovision Song Contest representing the Czech Republic seven times since its first entry in 2007. The nation competed in the contest on three consecutive occasions between 2007 and 2009 without qualifying to the final: in 2007 Kabát performing "Malá dáma" placed 28th (last) in the semi-final achieving only one point, in 2008 Tereza Kerndlová performing "Have Some Fun" placed 18th (second to last) in her semi-final scoring nine points and in 2009 Gipsy.cz performing the song "Aven Romale" placed 18th (last) in their semi-final failing to score any points. The Czech broadcaster withdrew from the contest between 2010 and 2014 citing reasons such as low viewing figures and poor results for their absence. Since returning to the contest in 2015 and qualifying to the final for the first time in 2016, Czech Republic has featured in two finals. In 2018, the country qualified to the final placing 6th with Mikolas Josef and the song "Lie to Me".

As part of its duties as participating broadcaster, ČT organises the selection of its entry in the Eurovision Song Contest and broadcasts the event in the country. The broadcaster has used both national finals and internal selections to select its entry in the past. ČT confirmed its intentions to participate at the 2019 contest in August 2018, while also confirming that the entry would be selected through a national final.

== Before Eurovision ==
=== Eurovision Song CZ 2019 ===
Eurovision Song CZ 2019 was the national final organised by ČT in order to select its entry for the Eurovision Song Contest 2019. Eight entries participated in the competition which took place online between 7 and 21 January 2019, with the winner being selected via a jury and public vote and announced on 28 January 2019.

==== Competing entries ====
Artists and composers were able to submit their proposals to the broadcaster between 31 August 2018 and 31 October 2018. Artists were required to have Czech citizenship and for groups of a maximum of six members, at least one of the lead vocalists were required to have Czech citizenship. Songwriters of any nationality were able to submit songs. The broadcaster received 300 submissions at the closing of the deadline, of which over 60 were written by Czech songwriters. ČT selected eight entries for the national final from the submissions received, which were presented to the public during a press conference on 7 January 2019.

==== Final ====
Eight entries competed in the national final and the winner was determined by the combination of votes from an eleven-member international jury panel and a public vote held via the official Eurovision Song Contest application between 7 and 21 January 2019. The international jury consisted of ten former Eurovision entrants, while both international and Czech users were able to vote via the app. Votes from users in the Czech Republic were counted towards the public vote, while votes from international users were counted towards the jury vote and had a weighting equal to the votes of a single jury member. The winner, "Friend of a Friend" performed by Lake Malawi, was announced on 28 January 2019.

The international jury panel consisted of:

- Cesár Sampson – represented Austria in 2018
- Rasmussen – represented Denmark in 2018
- Zibbz – represented Switzerland in 2018
- Ira Losco – represented Malta in 2002 and 2016
- Elina Nechayeva – represented Estonia in 2018
- AWS – represented Hungary in 2018
- Alma – represented France in 2017
- Ari Ólafsson – represented Iceland in 2018
- Jowst – represented Norway in 2017
- Ryan O'Shaughnessy – represented Ireland in 2018

Artist	Song	Songwriter(s)	Jury	Public	Total	Place
Andrea Holá	"Give Me a Hint"	František Valena	8	4	12	5
Barbora Mochowa	"True Colors"	Barbora Mochowa, Viliam Béreš, Koos Kamerling	12	6	18	4
Hana Barbara	"Poslední slova tobě"	Hana Schořová, Marcus Tran	4	1	5	8
Jakub Ondra	"Space Sushi"	Jakub Ondra, Michael Gubler, Boris Carloff, Viktor Dyk, Alasdair Bouch	6	12	18	2
Jara Vymer	"On My Knees"	Jaroslav Vymer, Boris Carloff	3	2	5	7
Lake Malawi	"Friend of a Friend"	Jan Steinsdoerfer, Mikołaj Trybulec, Albert Černý	12	10	22	1
Pam Rabbit	"Easy to Believe"	João Filipe de Carvalho, Pamela Koky	10	8	18	3
Tomáš Boček	"Don't Know Why"	Tomáš Boček, Boris Carloff, Alasdair Bouch	6	3	9	6

Detailed International Jury Votes
Song	Cesár Sampson	Rasmussen	Zibbz	Ira Losco	Elina Nechayeva	AWS	Alma	Ari Ólafsson	Jowst	Ryan O'Shaughnessy	International votes	Total	Points
Song	AUT	DEN	SUI	MAL	EST	HUN	FRA	ISL	NOR	IRL	International votes	Total	Points
"Give Me a Hint"	2	4	2	10	3	12	8	2	3	4	3	53	8
"True Colors"	12	12	12	8	10	6	12	6	8	10	12	108	12
"Poslední slova tobě"	3	3	3	6	6	2	4	4	6	6	2	45	4
"Space Sushi"	10	1	1	4	4	3	10	3	2	3	8	49	6
"On My Knees"	6	6	8	1	8	4	3	1	1	1	1	40	3
"Friend of a Friend"	8	10	6	12	12	8	6	12	12	12	10	108	12
"Easy to Believe"	1	2	10	3	1	10	1	8	10	2	6	54	10
"Don't Know Why"	4	8	4	2	2	1	2	10	4	8	4	49	6

=== Promotion ===
Lake Malawi made several appearances across Europe to specifically promote "Friend of a Friend" as the Czech Eurovision entry. On 16 February, Lake Malawi performed "Friend of a Friend" during the second semi-final of the Ukrainian Eurovision national final. The band performed during the Eurovision in Concert event which was held on 6 April at the AFAS Live venue in Amsterdam, Netherlands and hosted by Edsilia Rombley and Marlayne, the London Eurovision Party on 14 April at the Café de Paris venue in London, hosted by Nicki French and Paddy O'Connell, and the Eurovision Pre-Party Madrid event, which was held on 21 April at the Sala La Riviera venue in Madrid, Spain and hosted by Tony Aguilar and Julia Varela. On 24 April, Lake Malawi performed during the Eurovision Pre-Party, which was held at the Vegas City Hall in Moscow, Russia and hosted by Alexey Lebedev and Andres Safari.

== At Eurovision ==
According to Eurovision rules, all nations with the exceptions of the host country and the "Big Five" (France, Germany, Italy, Spain and the United Kingdom) are required to qualify from one of two semi-finals in order to compete for the final; the top ten countries from each semi-final progress to the final. The European Broadcasting Union (EBU) split up the competing countries into six different pots based on voting patterns from previous contests, with countries with favourable voting histories put into the same pot. On 28 January 2019, a special allocation draw was held which placed each country into one of the two semi-finals, as well as which half of the show they would perform in. The Czech Republic was placed into the first semi-final, to be held on 14 May 2019, and was scheduled to perform in the first half of the show.

Once all the competing songs for the 2019 contest had been released, the running order for the semi-finals was decided by the shows' producers rather than through another draw, so that similar songs were not placed next to each other. The Czech Republic was set to perform in position 6, following the entry from Slovenia and before the entry from Hungary.

In the Czech Republic, the semi-finals were broadcast on ČT2 and the final was broadcast on ČT1. All three shows featured commentary by Libor Bouček. The Czech spokesperson, who will announce the top 12-point score awarded by the Czech jury during the final, was Radka Rosická.

=== Semi-final ===
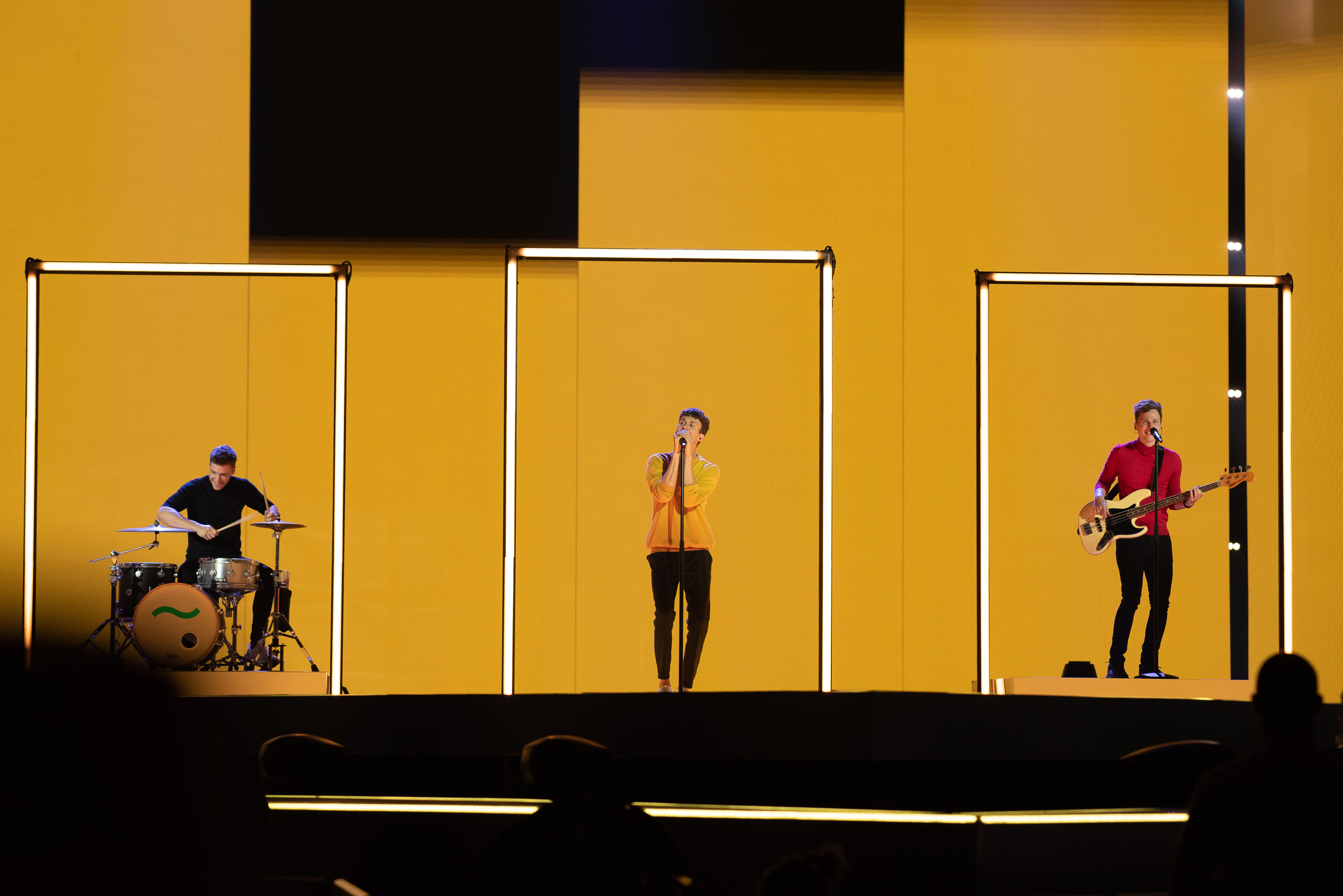
Lake Malawi during a rehearsal before the first semi-final

Lake Malawi took part in technical rehearsals on 4 and 9 May, followed by dress rehearsals on 13 and 14 May. This included the jury show on 13 May where the professional juries of each country watched and voted on the competing entries.

The Czech performance featured the members of Lake Malawi appearing on stage wearing jumpers of different colours: Albert Černý in yellow, Antonín Hrabal in black and Jeroným Šubrt in red. Each member were in separate blue, yellow and pink frames with the LED screens displaying yellow, red and black colours as well as the logo of the band with the word "Friend" in different languages written in it. The performance also featured the use of augmented reality, where the frames were multiplied and moved over the screen. Three off-stage backing vocalists performed with Lake Malawi: Adina Vostry, Jakub Gabriel Anděl Rajnoch and Jakub Xavier Baro.

At the end of the show, Czech Republic was announced as having finished in the top 10 and subsequently qualifying for the grand final. It was later revealed that the Czech Republic placed second in the semi-final, receiving a total of 242 points: 86 points from the televoting and 157 points from the juries.

=== Final ===
Shortly after the first semi-final, a winners' press conference was held for the ten qualifying countries. As part of this press conference, the qualifying artists took part in a draw to determine which half of the grand final they would subsequently participate in. This draw was done in the order the countries were announced during the semi-final. The Czech Republic was drawn to compete in the first half. Following this draw, the shows' producers decided upon the running order of the final, as they had done for the semi-finals. The Czech Republic was subsequently placed to perform in position 3, following the entry from Albania and before the entry from Germany.

Lake Malawi once again took part in dress rehearsals on 17 and 18 May before the final, including the jury final where the professional juries cast their final votes before the live show. The band performed a repeat of their semi-final performance during the final on 18 May. Czech Republic placed eleventh in the final, scoring 157 points: 7 points from the televoting and 150 points from the juries.

=== Voting ===
Voting during the three shows involved each country awarding two sets of points from 1-8, 10 and 12: one from their professional jury and the other from televoting. Each nation's jury consisted of five music industry professionals who are citizens of the country they represent, with their names published before the contest to ensure transparency. This jury judged each entry based on: vocal capacity; the stage performance; the song's composition and originality; and the overall impression by the act. In addition, no member of a national jury was permitted to be related in any way to any of the competing acts in such a way that they cannot vote impartially and independently. The individual rankings of each jury member as well as the nation's televoting results were released shortly after the grand final.

Below is a breakdown of points awarded to the Czech Republic and awarded by the Czech Republic in the first semi-final and grand final of the contest, and the breakdown of the jury voting and televoting conducted during the two shows:

==== Points awarded to the Czech Republic ====
Points awarded to the Czech Republic (Semi-final 1)
Score	Televote	Jury
12 points	Iceland	Australia; Estonia; Georgia; Portugal; Slovenia
10 points	Australia	Hungary; Iceland; Serbia
8 points	Estonia	Belgium; Finland; France; Greece; Spain
7 points		Belarus; Poland
6 points	Belgium; Israel	Israel
5 points	Finland; Poland; Slovenia; Spain	
4 points	Hungary; Portugal; San Marino	
3 points	Belarus; Montenegro	Montenegro; San Marino
2 points	Cyprus	
1 point	Georgia; Greece; Serbia	Cyprus

Points awarded to the Czech Republic (Final)
Score	Televote	Jury
12 points		Georgia; Hungary; Norway; Slovenia
10 points		Portugal
8 points		Estonia; Moldova; Romania
7 points		Croatia; Lithuania
6 points		Iceland; Spain
5 points		Australia; Belgium
4 points		Finland; Italy; Netherlands; Serbia
3 points		Armenia; Austria; France; Latvia
2 points	Australia; Iceland; Moldova	
1 point	Poland	Israel; Montenegro; Sweden; United Kingdom

==== Points awarded by the Czech Republic ====
Points awarded by the Czech Republic (Semi-final 1)
Score	Televote	Jury
12 points	San Marino	Slovenia
10 points	Australia	Cyprus
8 points	Estonia	Belarus
7 points	Poland	Poland
6 points	Iceland	Serbia
5 points	Slovenia	Greece
4 points	Serbia	Hungary
3 points	Belarus	Belgium
2 points	Hungary	Portugal
1 point	Cyprus	Georgia

Points awarded by the Czech Republic (Final)
Score	Televote	Jury
12 points	Russia	Sweden
10 points	Norway	Slovenia
8 points	Australia	Italy
7 points	Azerbaijan	North Macedonia
6 points	Iceland	Netherlands
5 points	Switzerland	Azerbaijan
4 points	Netherlands	Iceland
3 points	Israel	Malta
2 points	Italy	France
1 point	Estonia	Estonia

==== Detailed voting results ====
The following members comprised the Czech jury:

- Jitka Zelenková (jury chairperson) – singer
- Iva Boková – journalist, show host
- Šimon Holý – film director, musician, show host
- Ondřej Cikán – radio show host, media consultant
- Aneta Kharitonova (Annet X) – singer

Detailed voting results from the Czech Republic (Semi-final 1)
R/O	Country	Jury							Televote	
R/O	Country	I. Boková	Š. Holý	J. Zelenková	O. Cikán	Annet X	Rank	Points	Rank	Points
01	Cyprus	6	4	3	12	2	2	10	10	1
02	Montenegro	12	16	4	13	13	15		15	
03	Finland	4	14	9	11	11	12		16	
04	Poland	7	2	11	4	8	4	7	4	7
05	Slovenia	1	1	16	1	1	1	12	6	5
06	Czech Republic									
07	Hungary	14	3	13	6	5	7	4	9	2
08	Belarus	9	11	5	2	3	3	8	8	3
09	Serbia	3	15	10	3	7	5	6	7	4
10	Belgium	11	10	2	15	6	8	3	12	
11	Georgia	2	9	15	10	14	10	1	13	
12	Australia	10	7	6	14	12	13		2	10
13	Iceland	13	5	7	8	16	11		5	6
14	Estonia	5	13	14	9	9	14		3	8
15	Portugal	16	8	1	16	10	9	2	14	
16	Greece	8	6	12	5	4	6	5	11	
17	San Marino	15	12	8	7	15	16		1	12

Detailed voting results from the Czech Republic (Final)
R/O	Country	Jury							Televote	
R/O	Country	I. Boková	Š. Holý	J. Zelenková	O. Cikán	Annet X	Rank	Points	Rank	Points
01	Malta	7	12	10	11	4	8	3	21	
02	Albania	18	21	20	16	19	20		22	
03	Czech Republic									
04	Germany	14	14	11	17	16	16		23	
05	Russia	22	25	23	24	17	22		1	12
06	Denmark	11	16	19	6	15	13		11	
07	San Marino	25	18	24	25	25	25		18	
08	North Macedonia	2	10	1	8	6	4	7	12	
09	Sweden	1	2	2	4	3	1	12	16	
10	Slovenia	3	3	6	2	2	2	10	14	
11	Cyprus	13	5	18	15	9	12		20	
12	Netherlands	8	4	3	3	7	5	6	7	4
13	Greece	19	15	16	23	14	19		24	
14	Israel	23	23	22	19	18	21		8	3
15	Norway	24	22	21	22	22	23		2	10
16	United Kingdom	10	13	7	9	11	11		25	
17	Iceland	4	7	14	5	24	7	4	5	6
18	Estonia	12	20	4	7	13	10	1	10	1
19	Belarus	21	19	15	13	10	17		19	
20	Azerbaijan	5	9	8	1	8	6	5	4	7
21	France	17	8	5	14	5	9	2	17	
22	Italy	6	1	9	10	1	3	8	9	2
23	Serbia	16	17	17	12	21	18		13	
24	Switzerland	9	11	12	18	12	14		6	5
25	Australia	15	6	13	21	20	15		3	8
26	Spain	20	24	25	20	23	24		15	
