= Charlie Straight =

Czech indie rock band

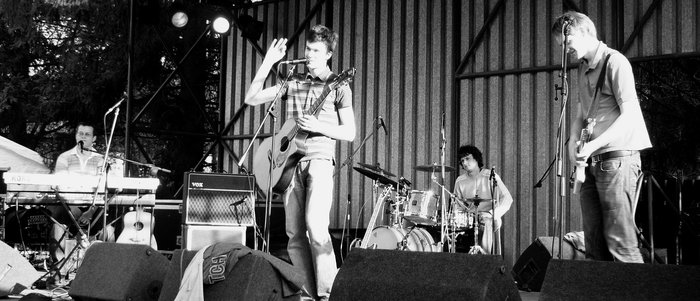
- Charlie Straight in 2008

Background information
- Origin: Třinec, Czech Republic
- Genres: Indie rock; Britpop
- Years active: 2006–2013
- Label: Straight Behaviour
- Past members: Albert Černý; Michal Šupák; Johnny Cienciala; Pavel Pilch
- Website: charliestraight.com

Charlie Straight were a Czech indie rock band formed in Třinec in 2006. They combined indie rock with melodic and often electronic musical elements, and all their lyrics were sung in English. They released two studio albums and won a number of awards, before breaking up in 2013. Lead singer Albert Černý went on to form the indie pop group Lake Malawi, who represented the Czech Republic at the Eurovision Song Contest 2019 in Tel Aviv, Israel.

== History ==
Charlie Straight was formed in 2006 by Albert Černý (lead vocals), Jan Cienciala (bass), Michal Šupák (guitar, programming), and Pavel Pilch (drums). Pilch had been Černý's drum teacher, as well as playing in several jazz bands with Šupák, an AMU graduate. Cienciala had been a classmate of Černý's in grammar school and they had also played music together.

The band released their debut album, She's a Good Swimmer, in 2009. In addition to receiving positive reviews, the record was nominated for a Český slavík award and won three prizes at that year's Anděl Awards, in the categories Discovery of the Year, Best Music Video ("Platonic Johny"), and Best Album. They played numerous concerts and festivals, and garnered a fan base not only locally but even abroad.

In 2010, Charlie Straight won the first MTV Europe Music Award for Best Czech & Slovak Act. It was presented by crooner Karel Gott. A year later, they received the same honour.

In 2012, the band released their sophomore record, titled Someone with a Slow Heartbeat. A year later, they toured the UK, released the single "I Sleep Alone", featuring vocals by Markéta Irglová, and won an Anděl Award for Song of the Year with "Coco". Later the same year, they announced that they were splitting up. Albert Černý formed the indie pop group Lake Malawi, guitarist Michal Šupák launched the band Noisy Pots, and bassist Johnny Cienciala started the project Big Destiny.

== Band members ==
- Albert Černý – vocals, guitar
- Jan Cienciala – bass
- Michal Šupák – guitar, programming
- Pavel Pilch – drums

== Discography ==
Albums

- She's a Good Swimmer (2009)
- Someone with a Slow Heartbeat (2012)

Singles

- "I Sleep Alone (feat. Markéta Irglová)" (2013)

== Awards ==
- Nominated – 2009 Český slavík – Discovery of the Year for She's a Good Swimmer
- 2009 Anděl Awards – Discovery of the Year, Best Music Video, and Best Album for She's a Good Swimmer
- MTV Europe Music Award for Best Czech & Slovak Act 2010, 2011
- 2011 Český slavík – Music Video of the Year
- 2012 Český slavík – Internet Star
- 2013 Anděl Award – Song of the Year for "Coco"
