= Lake Malawi (band) =

Czech indie pop band

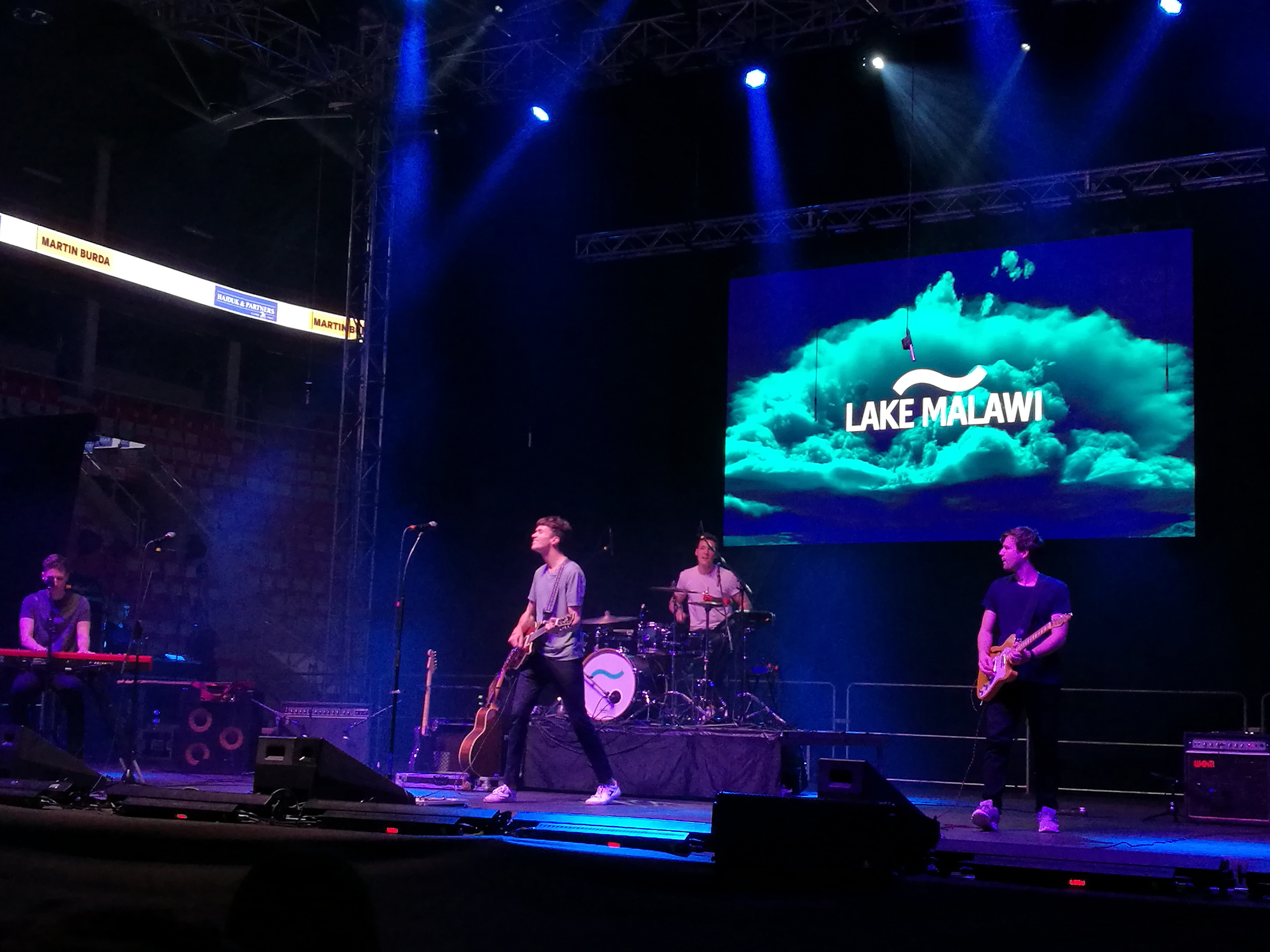
- Lake Malawi performing in 2019

Background information
- Origin: Třinec, Czech Republic
- Genres: Indie pop
- Years active: 2013–present
- Members: Albert Černý; Jeroným Šubrt
- Past members: Pavel Pilch; Patrick Karpentski; Antonín Hrabal
- Website: lakemalawimusic.com

Lake Malawi is a Czech indie pop band from Třinec, formed in 2013. It currently consists of lead vocalist, guitarist, and keyboardist Albert Černý, and bassist and keyboardist Jeroným Šubrt. The band was formed by Černý following the breakup of his former group, Charlie Straight. Their debut EP, We Are Making Love Again, was released in 2015 and followed by the album Surrounded by Light in 2017. They represented the Czech Republic in the Eurovision Song Contest 2019 with the song "Friend of a Friend", finishing in eleventh place. In 2022, they released their second album, The Great Video Game Crush. The band's lyrics are in English.

== History ==
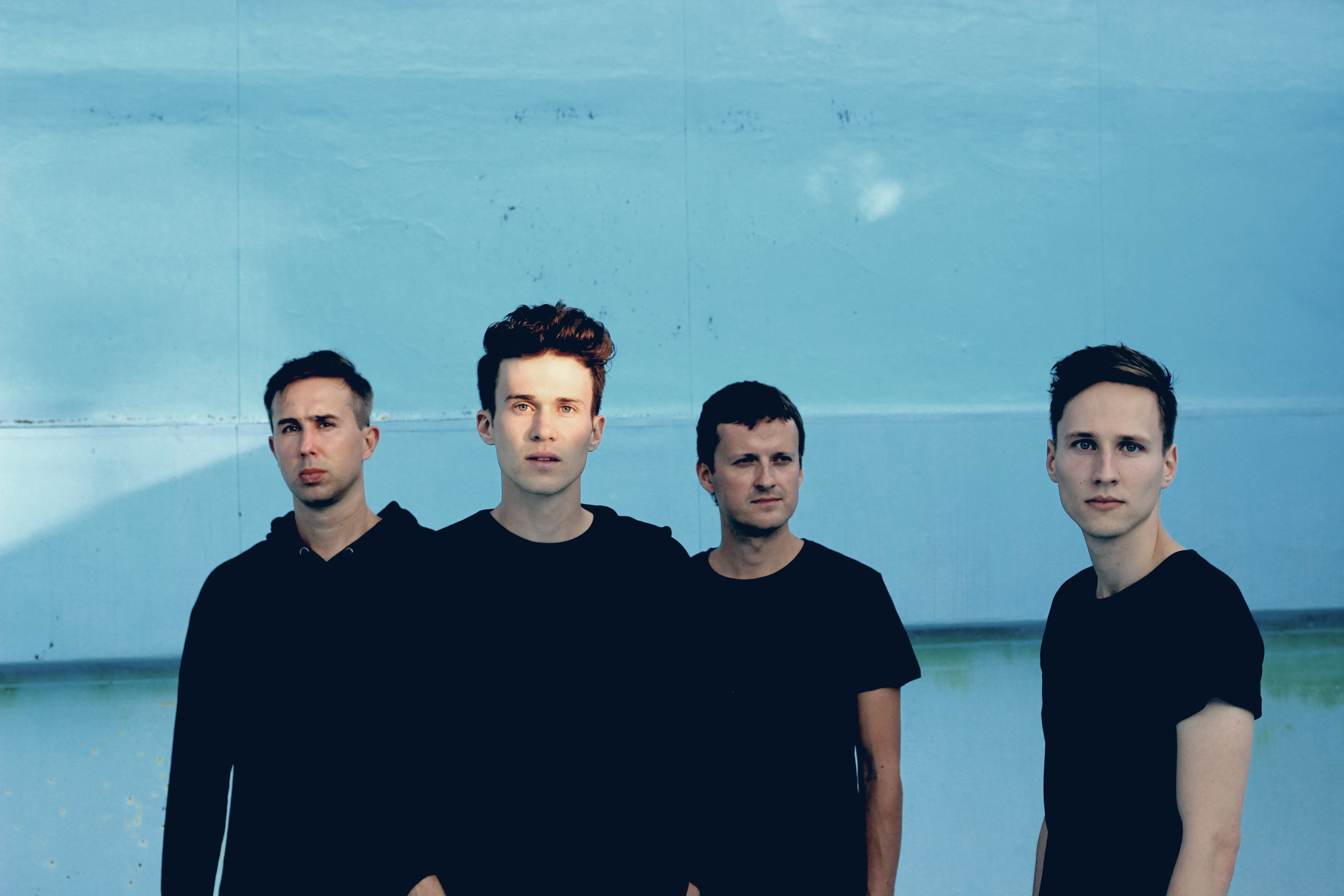
Lake Malawi original lineup, 2015

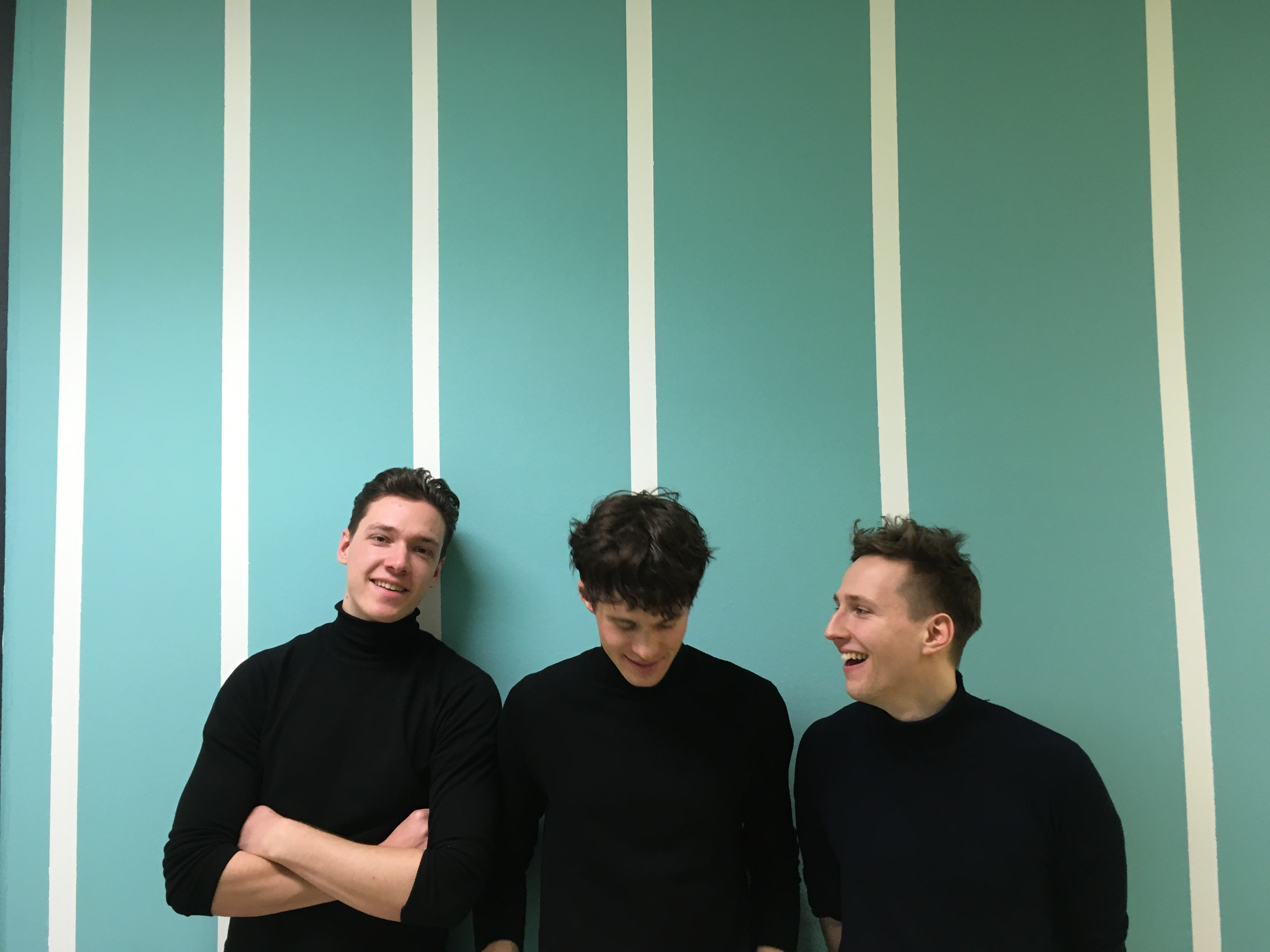
Lake Malawi in 2018

Lake Malawi was founded by singer Albert Černý following the breakup of his former band, Charlie Straight, in September 2013. The band's name is inspired by the Bon Iver song "Calgary", from their 2011 self-titled album.

Lake Malawi released their debut single, "Always June", in 2014, performing it live on BBC London. That year, the band played at the Czech music festivals Colours of Ostrava and Rock for People as well as the Great Escape Festival in the UK. A year later, they issued their debut EP, We Are Making Love Again. They opened for several notable acts performing in Prague, including the Kooks, Mika, and Thirty Seconds to Mars. In 2016, drummer and former Charlie Straight member Pavel Pilch left the band and was replaced by Antonín Hrabal.

In 2017, Lake Malawi self-released the studio album Surrounded by Light. It produced two singles: the title track and "Paris", both of which charted on the Rádio – Top 100 in the Czech Republic. Lead guitarist Patrick Karpentski left the band in late 2017. In 2019, it was announced that Lake Malawi were taking part in the Czech national final for the Eurovision Song Contest 2019, with the song "Friend of a Friend". The track later won the national selection and represented the Czech Republic in the contest. After performing sixth in the first semi-final, the band qualified for the final, where they finished in eleventh place, with 157 points. The following year, after Černý's solo qualification to the Polish national final for the Eurovision Song Contest 2020, the other band members performed the song "Lucy" alongside him in the final of the selection and finished in second place.

== Band members ==
Current

- Albert Černý – vocals, guitar, keyboards (2013–present)
- Jeroným Šubrt – bass, keyboards (2013–present)

Past

- Pavel Pilch – drums (2013–2016)
- Patrick Karpentski – guitar (2013–2017)
- Antonín Hrabal – drums (2016–2021)

Touring members

- Lukáš Chromek – guitar
- David Kandler – guitar
- Matyáš Vorda – drums
- Pavel Plašil – drums
- Jan Uvira – keyboards

== Discography ==
=== Studio albums ===
Title	Details	Peak chart positions
Title	Details	CZE
Surrounded by Light	Released: 10 November 2017; Format: Digital download, CD; Label: Holidays Forever	81
The Great Video Game Crush	Released: 21 October 2022; Format: Digital download, CD; Label: Holidays Forever	—

=== EPs ===
Title	Details
We Are Making Love Again	Released: 25 May 2015; Format: Digital download; Label: Self-released
Lake Malawi	Released: 31 October 2025; Format: Digital download; Label: At the Studios/BMG

=== Singles ===
Single	Year	Peak chart positions				Album or EP
Single	Year	CZE	CZE (Dig.)	SWE	UK Down.	Album or EP
"Always June"	2014	34	—	—	—	Non-album single
"Chinese Trees"	2014	25	—	—	—	We Are Making Love Again
"Aubrey"	2015	—	—	—	—	We Are Making Love Again
"Young Blood"	2015	—	—	—	—	We Are Making Love Again
"We Are Making Love Again"	2016	43	—	—	—	We Are Making Love Again
"Prague (In the City)"	2017	—	—	—	—	Surrounded by Light
"Surrounded by Light"	2017	64	—	—	—	Surrounded by Light
"Not My Street"	2017	—	—	—	—	Non-album single
"Bottom of the Jungle"	2017	—	—	—	—	Surrounded by Light
"Paris"	2017	85	—	—	—	Surrounded by Light
"Spaced Out"	2018	—	—	—	—	Surrounded by Light
"Friend of a Friend"	2019	—	92	86	65	Non-album singles
"Stuck in the 80's"	2019	85	—	—	—	Non-album singles
"Lucy"	2020	—	—	—	—	Non-album singles
"Shaka Zulu"	2021	—	—	—	—	Non-album singles
"Spinning"	2022	—	—	—	—	The Great Video Game Crush
"High-Speed Kissing" (with We Are Domi)	2022	—	—	—	—	The Great Video Game Crush
"Mermaid Surf Club"	2022	—	—	—	—	The Great Video Game Crush
"Joanne"	2022	—	—	—	—	The Great Video Game Crush
"Another Christmas Song" (with Tamara Kramar)	2023	—	—	—	—	Non-album single
"—" denotes a release that did not chart or was not released in that territory.

=== Other charted songs ===
Title	Year	Peak chart positions	Album
Title	Year	CZR	Album
"Sail Away"	2025	18	Lake Malawi
"Talk to Me"	2026	73	Lake Malawi

Awards and achievements
Preceded by Mikolas Josef with "Lie to Me"	Czech Republic in the Eurovision Song Contest; 2019	Succeeded by Benny Cristo with "Kemama"
