= Katarzia =

Katarzia (slovak songwriter)
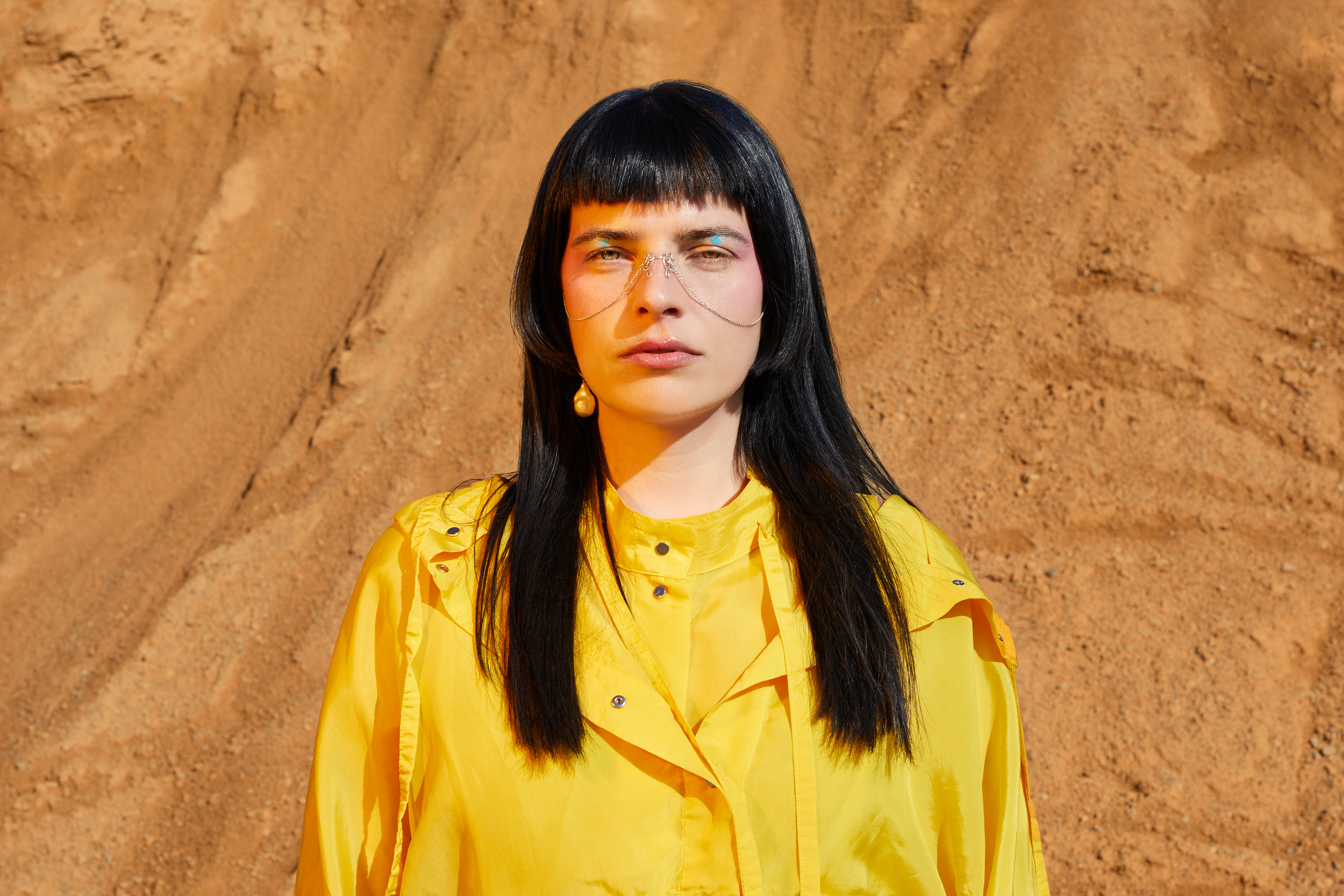
- Katarzia in 2023

Background information
- Born: Katarína Kubošiová; 9 February 1989 (age 37); Nitra, Czechoslovakia
- Origin: Slovakia
- Genres: Pop
- Occupation: Singer
- Instruments: guitar, flute, Ableton
- Works: Generácia Y Agnostika Antigona Celibát n5 Šťastné dieťa
- Years active: 2012–present
- Labels: Slnko Records, Animal Music Label
- Website: https://katarzia.sk

Katarzia (born 9 February 1989) is a Slovak artist, singer-songwriter and producer. Her song "Kde sa slzy berú" was named best single of 2017 at the Radio Head Awards. Her songwriting has also been recognised; alongside Jonatán Pastirčák she composed music and lyrics for the Slovak National Theatre's adaption of the Sophocles play Antigone. It was recognised as Best Incidental Music at the 2018 DOSKY Awards. Kubošiová studied at the Academy of Performing Arts in Bratislava.

Katarzia is a self-made artist, songwriter, lyricist and music producer based in Prague, singing in Slovak language. She was raised in theatre and earned a master's degree at film screenwriting and dramaturgy. Katarzia often collaborates with Jonatán Pastirčák (Isama Zing, Pjoni), who is a well-known Slovak artist, producer and film music composer coming from the Slovak experimental scene. and sonic magician and producer Oliver Torr. H

Her collaboration with Jonatán, which had a significant impact on her music and even her vocal style, started in Slovak national theatre, when they worked on music for a theatre play Antigone (2018) and later released an eponymous album.

Collaboration with Oliver Torr started during covid, when they became friends after performing at theatre Archa on a laser show created by legendary light-designer David Vrbík. She composed her 5th album n5 in Ableton and asked Oliver to water it with his field, ASMR electronic sound design environment and progressive mix.

For live performances of this album, they connected computers and machines with Jonatán, including his skill on cello, and another well-known czech artist and producer Aid Kid, and played shows based on sounds and light-design, which was a work of theatre set and techno club light-designer Tereza Bartůňková and later collaborated with Tomáš Košťák. In 2023 Katarzia is coming back to acoustic band sound, to underline her mellow and relationship-analyzing lyrics. Katarzia has been involved in different kinds of activism, supporting all kinds of freedom.

Katarzia uses her public appearance for activism. She has been fighting for women's rights, feminism and always showed her support to LGBTQ+ community.

Katarzia is a RBMA Berlin 2018 alumni, performed at international festivals like Sonar Barcelona, or Nu Blu New York club.

== Discography ==
=== Studio albums ===
- 2013: Generácia Y
- 2016: Agnostika
- 2018: Antigona
- 2020: Celibát
- 2021: n5
- 2023: Šťastné dieťa

== Awards and nominations ==
Year	Nominated work	Award	Category	Result	Ref
2017	"Kde sa slzy berú"	Radio Head Awards	Best Single	Winner	
2018	Antigone	DOSKY Awards	Best Incidental Music	Winner	
