= Benny Cristo =

Czech singer and athlete (born 1987)

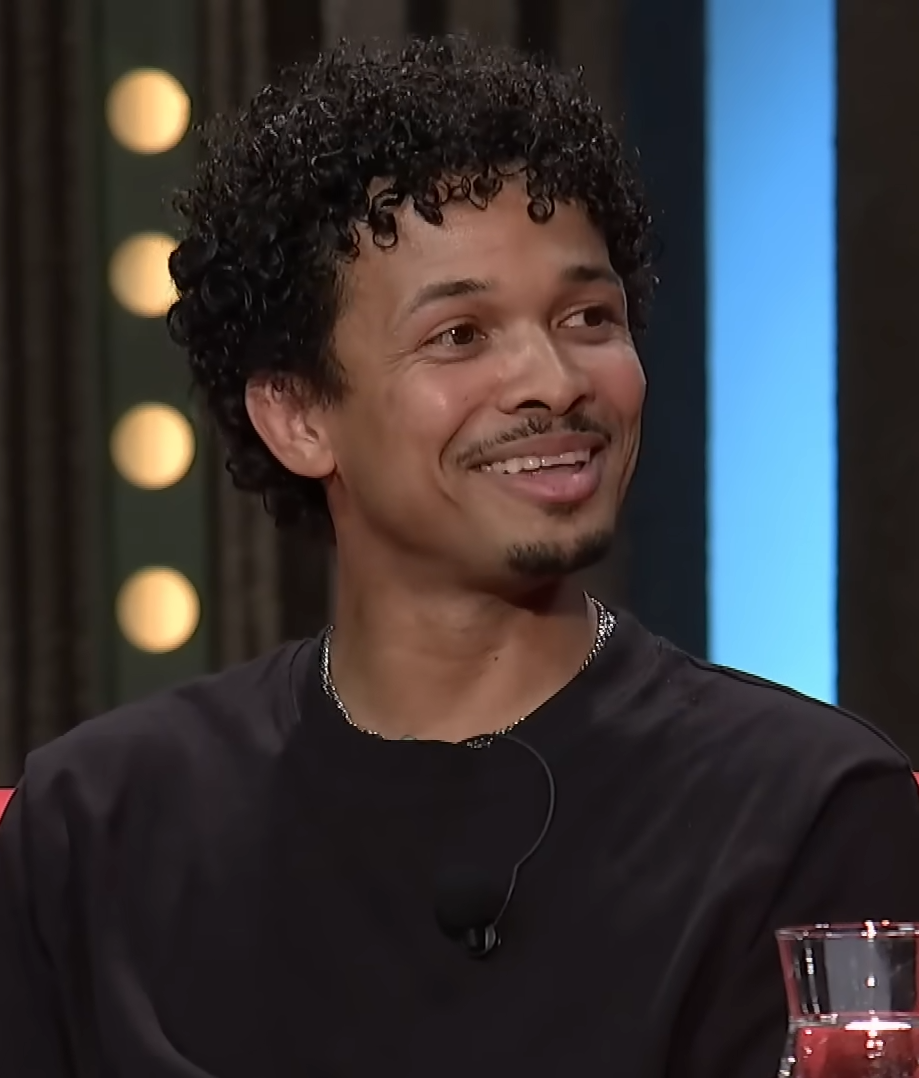
- Cristo in 2023

Background information
- Born: Ben da Silva Cristóvão; 8 June 1987 (age 38); Plzeň, Czechoslovakia
- Genres: Hip hop; R&B; pop
- Occupation: Singer
- Instruments: Vocals
- Years active: 2009–present
- Website: bennycristo.com

Ben da Silva Cristóvão (born 8 June 1987), known professionally as Ben Cristovao or Benny Cristo, is a Czech singer. He was nominated to represent the Czech Republic in the 2020 Eurovision Song Contest in Rotterdam, after winning the national round with the song "Kemama". After the contest was cancelled due to the COVID-19 pandemic, Czech Television confirmed that Cristo would instead represent the nation in the 2021 contest. Cristo sings in both Czech and English.

== Music career ==
In 2009, Benny Cristo was one of the finalists on the talent show Česko Slovenská SuperStar. The experiences gained in this show motivated him to focus on his singing career. In 2010, he released his debut album, Definitely Different. A year later, his second studio album, called Benny Cristo, came out. It contains two collaborations with Monika Bagárová, another contestant from Česko Slovenská SuperStar.

In 2013, Cristo was nominated for the Český slavík award in the category Music Video of the Year, for the song "Bomby". The same year, he released his third studio album, Made in Czechoslovakia.

In 2016, Cristo won the Český slavík award in the category "Most Streamed Czech Song", with the track "ASIO". He did not attend the award ceremony, however. As he later stated to the media, he did not want to be in the same room as the Czech group Ortel, known for their xenophobic texts. Also in 2016, Cristo recorded a cover of the David Koller song "Nic není na stálo", which was released together with songs by artists such as Katarzia, Kato, Mucha, and Vladimír 518, on the album David Koller & Friends.

In 2017, Cristo issued the EP Poslední. In 2018, he performed at the Anděl Awards ceremony, singing his song "Nohy", with the guest appearance of Jiří Korn. He later collaborated with Mária Čírová on the theme song for the movie Backstage, directed by Andrea Sedláčková. The song is called "Padam". Cristo himself appears in the film as a judge in a dance competition. The same year, he became a judge on Česko Slovenská Superstar.

In 2019, Cristo released the six-song EP Kontakt. He was selected to represent his country in the 2020 Eurovision Song Contest, after winning the national round. He was to perform in Rotterdam, Netherlands, with the song "Kemama". However, the event was cancelled as a result of the COVID-19 pandemic. In May 2020, it was confirmed that Cristo would sing for the Czech Republic in the 2021 event, with a new song. His entry for 2021, "Omaga", was released on 16 February 2021. He sang in the second semifinal of the contest but did not qualify for the final, finishing 15th, with 23 points.

== Activism ==
Benny Cristo is vegan and an animal rights activist. He takes part in various projects and campaigns supporting animal rights. In 2018, he worked together with the organisation Obránci zvířat (OBRAZ) and made a voiceover for one of their campaign videos, called "Jak to snáší", dealing with the issue of caged hens.

== Sport career ==
Alongside his musical career, Benny is also an active sportsman. He has competed in Brazilian jiu-jitsu around the world. In September 2016, he participated in the Asian Championship and placed third in the medium heavy (up to 88 kg) white belt category. In October of the same year, he participated in the international championship Madrid Open and won the gold medal in the same category.

== Personal life ==
Cristo's mother is Czech, and his father is from Angola. His sister Bianca is a stand-up comedian.

== Discography ==
=== Studio albums ===
Title	Details
Definitely Different	Released: 2010; Format: Digital download; Label: Championship Music
Benny Cristo	Released: 2011; Format: Digital download; Label: Championship Music
Made in Czechoslovakia	Released: 13 March 2014; Format: Digital download; Label: Championship Music
Septum	Released: 17 January 2025; Format: Digital download; Label: Universal

=== EPs ===
Title	Details
Poslední	Released: 30 June 2017; Format: Digital download; Label: Championship Music
Live Ben	Released: 3 May 2019; Format: Digital download; Label: Championship Music
Kontakt	Released: 28 June 2019; Format: Digital download; Label: Championship Music

=== Singles ===
Title	Year	Peak chart positions		Album
Title	Year	CZE	CZE (Dig.)	Album
"Be Mine"	2013	—	—	
"Těžký váhy"	2014	—	—	
"Nemůžu si dovolit"	2014	—	—	
"Utebebejt"	2014	—	—	
"Žijuproto"	2015	—	—	
"Ironben"	2015	—	—	
"Tabu"	2015	—	—	
"Asio" (feat. The Glowsticks)	2016	—	22	
"Pure Girl"	2016	—	50	
"Food Revolution Day"	2016	—	—	
"Penny"	2016	—	—	
"TV Shows"	2017	—	—	
"Padam" (feat. Mária Čírová)	2018	—	24	
"Mowgli"	2018	—	—	
"Smitko"	2018	—	—	
"Naha"	2018	—	26	
"Rekviem" (with Nox Septima)	2018	—	—	
"Stories" (feat. Reginald & The Glowsticks)	2019	—	—	
"Aleiaio"	2019	—	3	
"Kemama"	2020	65	—	
"Šílený"	2020	—	—	
"Ledová"	2021	—	—	
"Omaga"	2021	—	—	
"365" (with YG Moris)	2023	—	—	
"Brighter Day" (with Sara James)	2023	—	—	
"Fire" (with Toby Romeo)	2024	—	—	
"On My Way" (with YouNotUs)	2025	—	—	

== Filmography ==
- Medieval – Adjar, a Cuman mercenary (2022)

Awards and achievements
Preceded by Lake Malawi with "Friend of a Friend"	Czech Republic in the Eurovision Song Contest; 2020 (cancelled)	Succeeded by Himself with "Omaga"
Preceded by Himself with "Kemama"	Czech Republic in the Eurovision Song Contest; 2021	Succeeded by We Are Domi with "Lights Off"
