= Kemama =

2020 song by Benny Cristo

Single by Benny Cristo
- Released: 20 January 2020
- Length: 3:00
- Label: Black Different
- Songwriter(s): Osama Verse-Atile; Ben Cristóvão; Charles Sarpong; Rudy Ray

Benny Cristo singles chronology
"Aleiaio" (2019)	"Kemama" (2020)	"Šílený" (2020)

Eurovision Song Contest 2020 entry
- Country: Czech Republic
- Artist(s): Benny Cristo
- Language: English
- Composer(s): Osama Verse-Atile; Ben Cristóvão; Charles Sarpong; Rudy Ray
- Lyricist(s): Osama Verse-Atile; Ben Cristóvão; Charles Sarpong; Rudy Ray

Finals performance
- Semi-final result: Contest cancelled

Entry chronology
- ◄ "Friend of a Friend" (2019)
- "Omaga" (2021) ►

"Kemama" is a song performed by Czech singer Benny Cristo. It was chosen to represent the Czech Republic at the Eurovision Song Contest 2020, after winning the country's national final. The song was released as a digital download on 20 January 2020.

== Eurovision Song Contest ==
The song would have represented the Czech Republic in the Eurovision Song Contest 2020 after Benny Cristo was chosen through Eurovision Song CZ, the national selection process organised by Česká televize, to select the Czech Republic's entry for the Eurovision Song Contest. On 28 January 2020, a special allocation draw was held which placed each country into one of the two semi-finals, as well as selecting which half of the show they would perform in. Czech Republic was placed into the second semi-final, to be held on 14 May 2020, and was scheduled to perform in the first half of the show.

== Charts ==
Chart (2020)	Peak position
Czech Republic (Rádio – Top 100)	65
