= Friend of a Friend (Lake Malawi song) =

2019 song by Lake Malawi

Single by Lake Malawi
- Released: 7 January 2019
- Length: 2:52
- Label: Holidays Forever
- Songwriter(s): Jan Steinsdoerfer; Mikołaj Trybulec; Albert Černý
- Producer(s): Jan Steinsdoerfer; Mikołaj Trybulec; Albert Černý

Lake Malawi singles chronology
"Spaced Out" (2018)	"Friend of a Friend" (2019)	"Stuck In the 80's" (2019)

Eurovision Song Contest 2019 entry
- Country: Czech Republic
- Artist(s): Lake Malawi
- Languages: English
- Composer(s): Jan Steinsdoerfer; Mikołaj Trybulec; Albert Černý
- Lyricist(s): Jan Steinsdoerfer; Mikołaj Trybulec; Albert Černý

Finals performance
- Semi-final result: 2nd
- Semi-final points: 242
- Final result: 11th
- Final points: 157

Entry chronology
- ◄ "Lie to Me" (2018)
- "Kemama" (2020) ►

"Friend of a Friend" is a song performed by Czech band Lake Malawi. The song represented the Czech Republic in the 2019 edition of the Eurovision Song Contest in Tel Aviv. The song was announced as the winner of the country's national selection on 28 January 2019. The song was performed during the first semi-final on 14 May 2019, and gained enough votes to qualify for the grand final, where it placed 11th on 18 May 2019.

== Eurovision Song Contest ==
The song represented the Czech Republic in the Eurovision Song Contest 2019, after Lake Malawi was chosen through Eurovision Song CZ, the national selection process organised by Česká televize to select Czech Republic's entry for the Eurovision Song Contest. On 28 January 2019, a special allocation draw was held which placed each country into one of the two semi-finals, as well as which half of the show they would perform in. Czech Republic was placed into the first semi-final, to be held on 14 May 2019, and was scheduled to perform in the first half of the show. Once all the competing songs for the 2019 contest had been released, the running order for the semi-finals was decided by the shows' producers rather than through another draw, so that similar songs were not placed next to each other. Czech Republic performed in position 6, and gained enough votes to qualify for the grand final. It finished in 11th place with 157 points, 150 gained from the juries and 7 from the public televote.

== Charts ==
Chart (2019)	Peak position
Czech Republic (Singles Digitál Top 100)	92
Estonia (Eesti Tipp-40)	18
Lithuania (AGATA)	13
Sweden (Sverigetopplistan)	86
UK Singles Downloads (OCC)	65
