= Albert Černý =

Czech musician (born 1989)

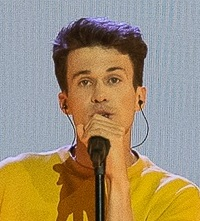
- Černý performing with Lake Malawi in 2019

Background information
- Born: 17 February 1989 (age 37); Třinec, Czechoslovakia
- Genres: Indie pop; indie rock
- Occupations: Singer; songwriter
- Instruments: Vocals; guitar
- Member of: Lake Malawi
- Formerly of: Charlie Straight

Albert Černý (born 17 February 1989) is a Czech singer and guitarist. He is known as the former lead singer of Charlie Straight, currently with Lake Malawi.

== Personal life ==
He graduated from a Polish elementary school and Czech high school in Třinec. Afterwards he graduated with a degree in English translation at Palacký University in Olomouc. Černý is of Polish descent. In 2022, he married Czech model Barbora Černá.

== Eurovision Song Contest ==
In 2019, he represented Czech Republic at the Eurovision Song Contest 2019 held in Tel Aviv, Israel as part of Lake Malawi. They performed the song "Friend of a Friend" and finished in 11th place with 157 points.

In January 2020, it was revealed that Černý would take part in Poland's Eurovision selection. He qualified to the final and placed second with the song “Lucy”.
