= Boris Carloff =

Czech musician, composer, and record producer

- Born: Milan Havrda; 17 September 1974 (age 51); Brno, Czechoslovakia
- Genres: Electronic
- Occupations: Musician, singer, composer, record producer
- Instrument: Violin,
- Years active: 2003–present
- Label: Championship Music
- Website: boriscarloff.cz

Boris Carloff (born Milan Havrda on 17 September 1974 in Brno) is a Czech musician, composer, and record producer. In 2012 he released the Apollo Award-winning album The Escapist, followed by Morphosis in 2014.

== Career ==
Boris Carloff studied classical violin and his first band Palm Beat was formed in 2003. He later played with several other projects and as producer he collaborated with acts including Kryštof and Wohnout. His stage name was inspired by English actor Boris Karloff. His first solo EP Good Stuff was released by Red Salamanda Records in 2004 and his debut full-length album The Escapist was released in 2012. The songs reflect on the passing of Carloff's brother and father in the two years prior. It includes guest performances by Doug Yowell and Ghetto Priest. The album won Apollo Award for the Best Album of the Year. He was also nominated in five categories of the Czech Anděl Awards, while winning two: 'Video of The Year' for Falling and 'The Best Electronic Album'.

In 2014, Boris Carloff released the album Morphosis, which was recorded with Icelandic producer Barði Jóhannsson.

== Discography ==
Albums

- kNot Photogenic – Underexposed (2005, Xproduction)
- Boris Carloff – The Escapist (2012, Championship music)
- Boris Carloff - Morphosis (2014, Championship music)
- Boris Carloff - The Solipsist (2017, Emerald and Doreen rec.)

EPs

- Palm Beat – I Wanna Be a Pair (2003, Distracktion Records)
- Boris Carloff – Good Stuff (2004, Red Salamanda Records)

== Awards ==
=== Wins ===
- Apollo Award 2012 - winner of the Czech music critics awards for the album The Escapist.
- Anděl Awards 2012 - Video of the Year for video "Falling"
- Anděl Awards 2012- Best Electronic Album for the album The Escapist

=== Nominations ===
- Anděl Awards 2012 - Nominated in the category "Newcomer of The Year"
- Anděl Awards 2012 - Nominated in the category "Singer of The Year"
- Anděl Awards 2012 - Nominated in the category "Album of The Year"
- Apollo Award 2014 - Nominated for the Czech music critics awards for the album Morphosis.
- Pure M Awards 2015 (Ireland) - Nominated for the Best International Act
