= Jan Macků =

Czech singer (born 1983)

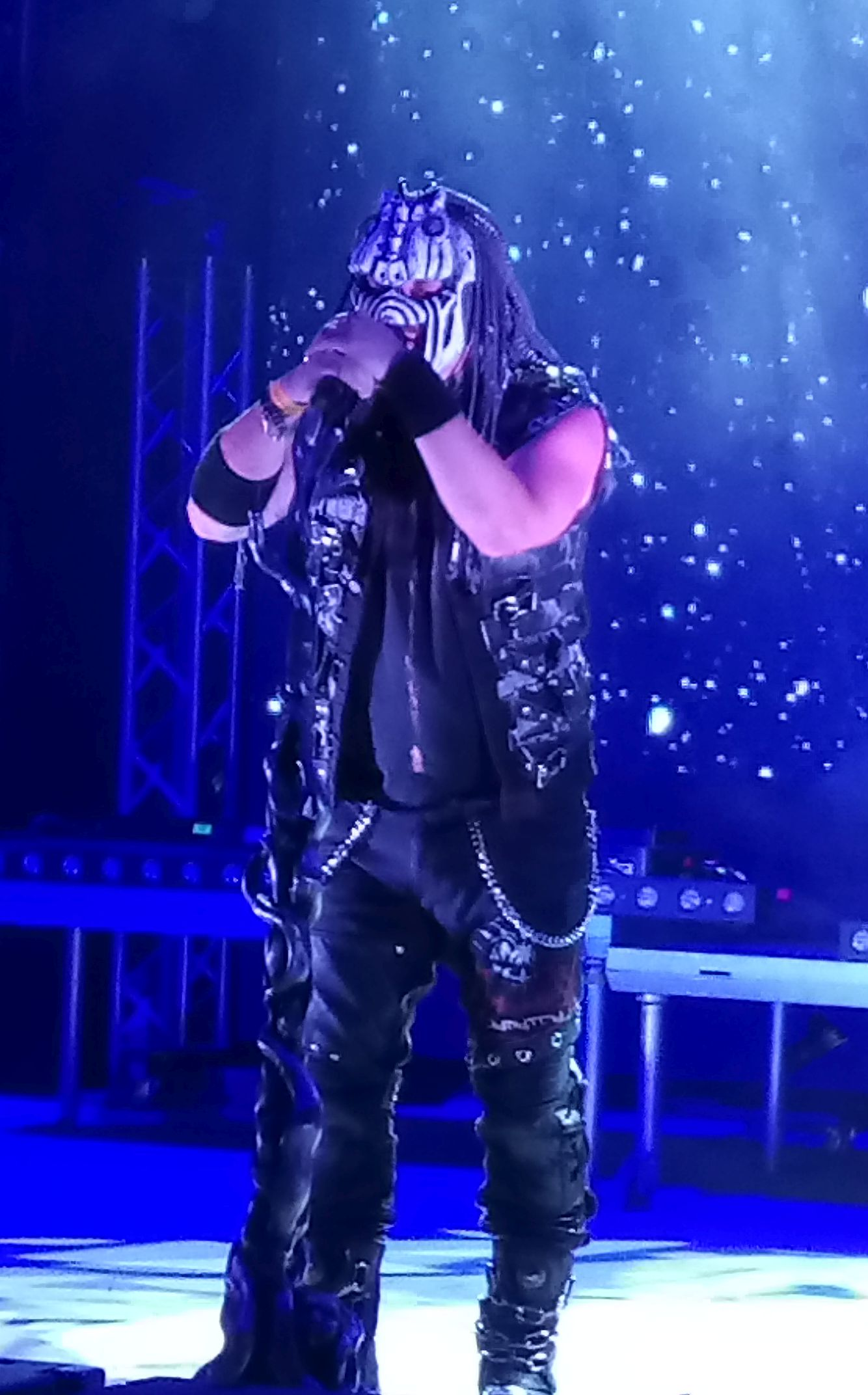
- Macků performing with Dymytry in 2017

Background information
- Also known as: Protheus
- Born: 8 September 1983 (age 42); Chrudim, Czechoslovakia
- Genres: Hard rock; psy-core
- Occupations: Singer; songwriter; teacher
- Instruments: Vocals; drums
- Years active: 2003–present
- Formerly of: Vatoma; Majsedum; Kotling Syndrome; Dolores Clan; Diphteria; Dymytry
- Website: protheus.cz

Jan Macků (born 8 September 1983) is a Czech singer from Chrudim who performs under the name Protheus. He was the frontman of the metal band Dymytry from 2005 until 2023. He also works as a teacher at the Faculty of Forestry and Wood Technology of the Czech University of Life Sciences in Prague. In the 2017 Český slavík poll, he ranked ninth.

Macků released six studio albums with Dymytry over the course of 20 years, as well as several EPs, live records, and compilations. As a solo artist, under the name Protheus, he has issued two studio albums and one live record.

== Biography ==
=== Childhood and early musical projects ===
Jan Macků was born into a musical family. His mother is the opera singer and singing coach Galla Macků, and his father is a longtime drummer in the Karel Vlach Orchestra. He took piano lessons as a child and later picked up the drums as well. Macků was inspired by metal bands such as Sepultura and Korn. While still in school, he played drums in the bands Vatoma and Majsedum.

=== Dymytry: 2005–2023 ===
In 2005, Macků briefly joined the band Dolores Clan as a drummer, later switching to vocals (taking the place of Václav Noid Bárta), before the band broke up. He also formed his own group, called Diphteria. The same year, he auditioned for the position of vocalist with the metal band Dymytry, who were then still relatively unknown, and whose original vocalist, Ondřej Černý, had left. He got the gig, took on the moniker "Protheus" (after the Greek god Proteus), and shortly after suggested that they wear insect-themed masks while performing, which the band continues to do to this day.

Macků went on to record six studio albums with Dymytry as well as a number of EPs, live albums, and compilations, before announcing his departure in October 2023, following their 20th anniversary concert at Prague's O2 Arena.

=== Solo work: 2019–present ===
Protheus – "Poločas" (music video)

In 2019, Macků released his first single under the name Protheus, titled "Poločas". A second single, "Závislosti", followed later that year.

He issued his debut studio album, Závislosti, in 2022, and followed it with Nepřestávej snít a year later. In 2024, he released the live album Forum Karlín 2024 Live.

=== Other musical projects ===
Macků has written songs for other artists, including "Ve vlasech tvých" for Arakain and "Zvon volá nás" for Lucie Bílá, which they sang as a duet.

In 2010, he performed in the rock opera Antigona at RockOpera Praha.

=== Teaching career ===
Macků earned his doctorate in forestry at the Czech University of Life Sciences in Prague and now teaches at his alma mater, within the Faculty of Forestry and Wood Technology. He teaches forestry mechanization and also develops new machines.

=== Personal life ===
Macků is married and has two children. As of 2016, he lived in Horoměřice.

== Discography ==
=== with Dymytry ===
Studio albums

- Neser (2010)
- Neonarcis (2012)
- Homodlak (2014)
- Agronaut (2016)
- Revolter (2019)
- Pharmageddon (2022)

EPs

- Psy-core (2006)
- Z pekla (2015
- Sedmero krkavců (2017)
- United We Stand (2017)
- Behind the Mask (split with Hämatom, 2018)

Live albums

- Živě 2015 (2015)
- Arakain/Dymytry – Live 2016 (2016)
- Monstrum žije! (2018)

Compilations

- Reser (2017)
- 20 let 2003–2023 (2023)

=== Solo ===
Studio albums

- Závislosti (2022)
- Nepřestávej snít (2023)

Live albums

- Forum Karlín 2024 Live (2024)

Singles

- "Poločas" (2019)
- "Závislosti" (2019)
