= Václav Noid Bárta =

Czech singer-songwriter and actor (born 1980)

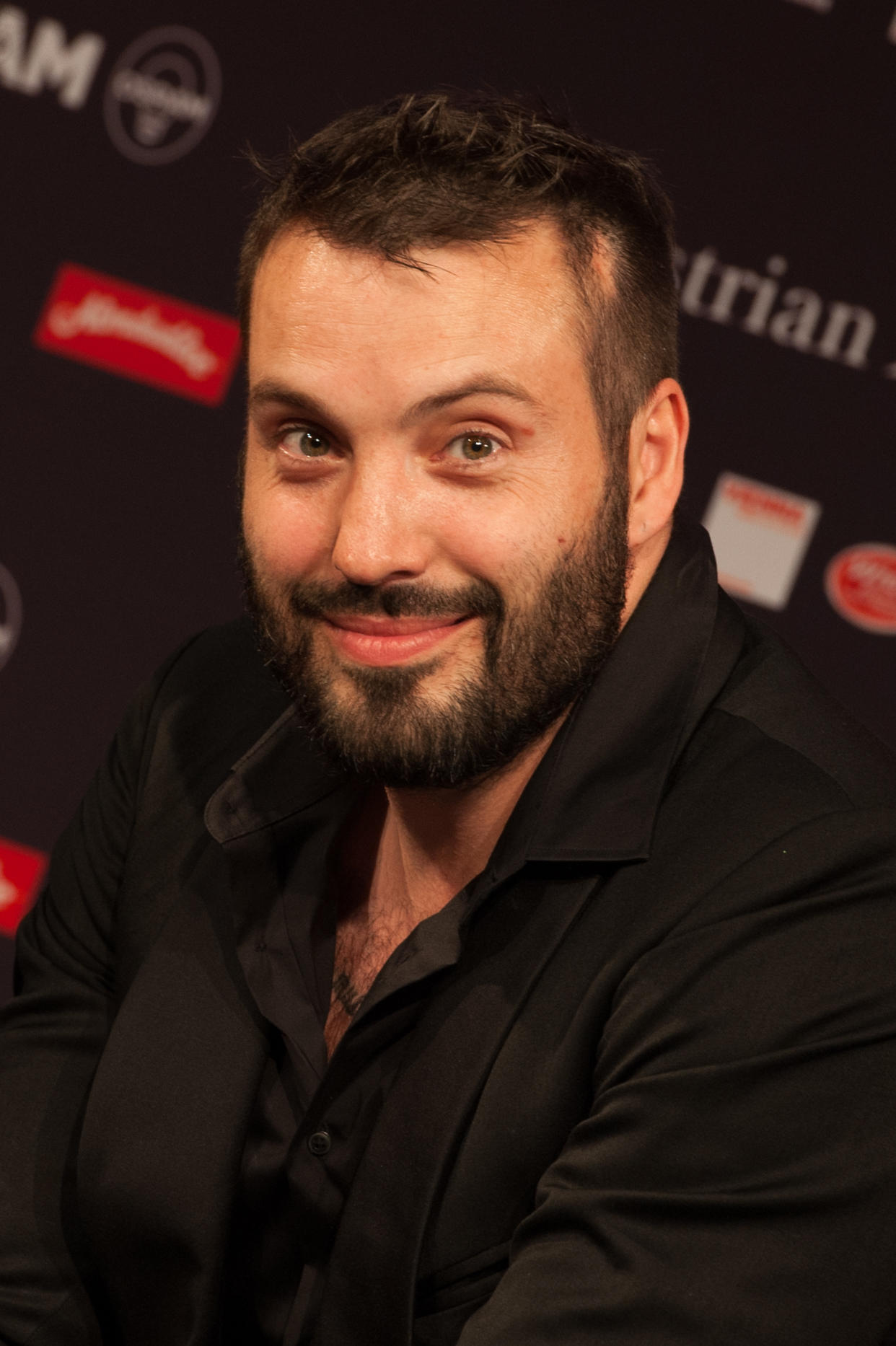
- Bárta in 2015
- Born: Václav Bárta; 27 October 1980 (age 45); Prague, Czechoslovakia
- Other name: Noid
- Occupations: Singer; songwriter; actor
- Years active: 1999–present
- Known for: Representing the Czech Republic in the 2015 Eurovision Song Contest; Being the vocalist of Dymytry
- Spouse(s): Lucie Bílá (m. 2006; div. 2008); Gabriela Dvořáková (m. 2014; div. 2018); Eliška Grabcová (m. 2022)
- Partner: Eliška Bučková (2010–2013)
- Parent(s): Václav Bárta (father); Lenka Bártová (mother)
- Musical career
- Genres: Rock; metal
- Instrument: Vocals
- Member of: Dymytry
- Formerly of: Dolores Clan
- Website: noid.cz

Václav "Noid" Bárta (born 27 October 1980) is a Czech singer-songwriter and actor from Prague. He has released several solo albums, either under his own name or as Noid, and he is the vocalist and frontman of the psy-core band Dymytry, with whom he has issued one studio album.

Bárta has appeared in a number of musical theatre productions, including Carmen, Jesus Christ Superstar, Aida, Mam'zelle Nitouche, Bonnie & Clyde, and Sestra v akci, as well as onscreen, such as in the 2010 film Kajínek and the television series Zoo.

== Biography ==
=== Early life ===
Václav Bárta was born on 27 October 1980 in Prague, into a musical family. His father, Václav Bárta, is a lyricist and music director, and his mother, Lenka Bártová, is a singer. As a child, he learned to play the recorder, piano, clarinet, guitar, bass, and drums.

=== Musical career ===
In 1999, Bárta cofounded the nu metal band Dolores Clan with friends. They released five studio albums, including the major-label Prwotní strach in 2004, and they opened for Limp Bizkit in Prague the same year. Dolores Clan split up in 2005, and Bárta formed his own group, called Noid Crew. In 2012, he released his debut studio album, titled Rány, under the name Noid, and followed it a year later with Václav Noid Bárta. In 2015, he issued the album Jedinej krok, again under the moniker Noid, which featured guest appearances by Marta Jandová and Daniel Landa, among others.

Also in 2015, Bárta represented the Czech Republic in the Eurovision Song Contest, alongside Marta Jandová, singing the song "Hope Never Dies".

In 2019, Bárta released the album Zem and followed with Hollywood in 2023.

Later in 2023, he became the vocalist of the metal band Dymytry, going on to record their latest studio album with them, titled V Dobrým I Zlým, in 2024.

In the 2024 Český slavík poll, Bárta won third place in the category Best Male Singer. A year later, he won the poll again, this time in first place.

=== Acting ===
Bárta got his first acting role in the 2010 Petr Jákl film, Kajínek. He then became involved in musical theatre, obtaining roles in such productions as Carmen, Jesus Christ Superstar, Aida, Mam'zelle Nitouche, Bonnie & Clyde, and Sestra v akci. He has also acted in the television series Svatby v Benátkách and Zoo.

=== Personal life ===
In 2006, Bárta married Czech pop singer Lucie Bílá, and they announced their separation on 1 September 2008. After a well-publicized affair with 2008 Česká Miss pageant winner Eliška Bučková beginning in 2010, the couple were engaged but broke up in January 2013. Later that April, Bárta began dating model Gabriela Dvořáková; the couple married on 7 July 2014. They have one daughter. They divorced in 2018. In 2022, he married dancer Eliška Grabcová. They have two daughters.

== Selected filmography ==
List of film appearances, with year, title, and role shown
Year	Title	Role	Notes
2010	Kajínek	Venca Křížek	
2014–2015	Svatby v Benátkách	Milan Hrones	TV series – 49 episodes
2022	The Old Blunderbuss Mystery 2	Václav	
2022–2023	Zoo	Lukáš Sýkora	TV series – 43 episodes

== Theatre ==
List of theatre performances, with year, title, and role shown
Year	Title	Role	Refs.
2012	Carmen	Garcia	
	Jesus Christ Superstar	Jesus Christ, Judas Iscariot, Pontius Pilate	
	Aida	Radames	
	Lucie, větší než malé množství lásky	Daniel	
	Mam'zelle Nitouche	Director	
2016	Bonnie & Clyde	Clyde Barrow	
	Madagascar: A Musical Adventure	Král Jelimán	
	Sestra v akci	Curtis Shank	

== Discography ==
=== with Dolores Clan ===
- Demo (1999)
- Promo (2000)
- When Rap Meets Rock (2001)
- Společney pohyb (2002)
- Prwotní strach (2004)

=== with Dymytry ===
Studio albums

- V Dobrým I Zlým (2024)

EPs

- Víc Než Bůh (split with Hämatom, 2023)
- Pin Me Down (split with Hämatom, 2023)

=== Solo ===
Studio albums

- Václav Noid Bárta (2013)
- Zem (2019)
- Hollywood (2023)

As Noid

- Rány (2012)
- Jedinej krok (2015)

Singles

- "Hope Never Dies" (with Marta Jandová) (Eurovision Song Contest 2015 – official Czech Republic entry)

Awards and achievements
Preceded by Gipsy.cz with "Aven Romale"	Czech Republic in the Eurovision Song Contest; 2015 (with Marta Jandová)	Succeeded by Gabriela Gunčíková with "I Stand"
