= Carmen (Wildhorn musical) =

2008 musical play

- Music: Frank Wildhorn
- Lyrics: Jack Murphy
- Book: Norman Allen
- Basis: Carmen by Prosper Mérimée
- Productions: 2008 Prague; 2013 Seoul; 2014 Tokyo; 2015 Kaunas; 2019 Winzendorf; 2024 Budapest

Carmen is a musical with a book by Norman Allen, lyrics by Jack Murphy, and music by Frank Wildhorn. It is based on the novella of the same name, by Prosper Mérimée.

Carmen premiered at Prague's Karlín Musical Theatre in October 2008.

== Synopsis ==
Carmen is the story of a Gypsy girl who is killed by the soldier who loves her.

== Original Czech production song list ==
Act I

- "Prolog (Sevillana)"
- "Cesty osudu" / "Winds of Fate"
- "Svět patří vám" / "The World is Yours"
- "Já věrnost ti přísahám" / "My Only Prayer"
- "Symbol žen" / "Every Woman in the World"
- "Ženská jako já" / "A Woman Like Me"
- "Ženská jako ty" / "A Woman Like You"
- "Čekání" / "While He's Waiting"
- "Chci tě" / I Want You Tonight
- Tak kráčí ženská / "Walk Like a Woman"
- "Každý jsme sám" / "We All Dance Alone"
- "Taková ženská" / "A Woman Like That"
- "Viva Amor!"
- "Nic nejde vzít zpět" / "No Turning Back"

Act II

- "Přijel cirkus" / "Ballyhoo"
- "Patříš mně" / "You Belong to Me"
- "Klíč" / "The Key"
- "Cizinec – můj stín" / "The Man I Have Become"
- "Kéž sílu mám" / "If I Could"
- "Svatá Terezo" / "Saint Theresa"
- "Blázen jak já" / "A Fool in Love"
- "Čekání" / "While He's Waiting (reprise)"
- "Přehlídka síly"" / Circus Tour de Force"
- "Jde vo kejhák" / "Be Afraid"
- "Finale"
- "Kéž sílu mám" / "If I Could (reprise)"

== Original Czech production cast ==
- Carmen: Lucie Bílá, Dasha
- Katarina: Dasha, Markéta Poulíčková
- José: Peter Strenáčik, Robert Jícha, Tomáš Löbl
- Garcia: Václav Noid Bárta, Martin Pošta, Lukáš Kumpricht
- Inéz: Pavla Břínková, Barbora Rajnišová
- Zuniga: Lukáš Kumpricht, Tomáš Trapl
- Mendoza: Jiří Korn, Josef Štágr
- Wise Woman: Athina Lagonska, Hanka Křížková
- Inmar: Ivo Hrbáč
