= Dymytry =

Czech metal band

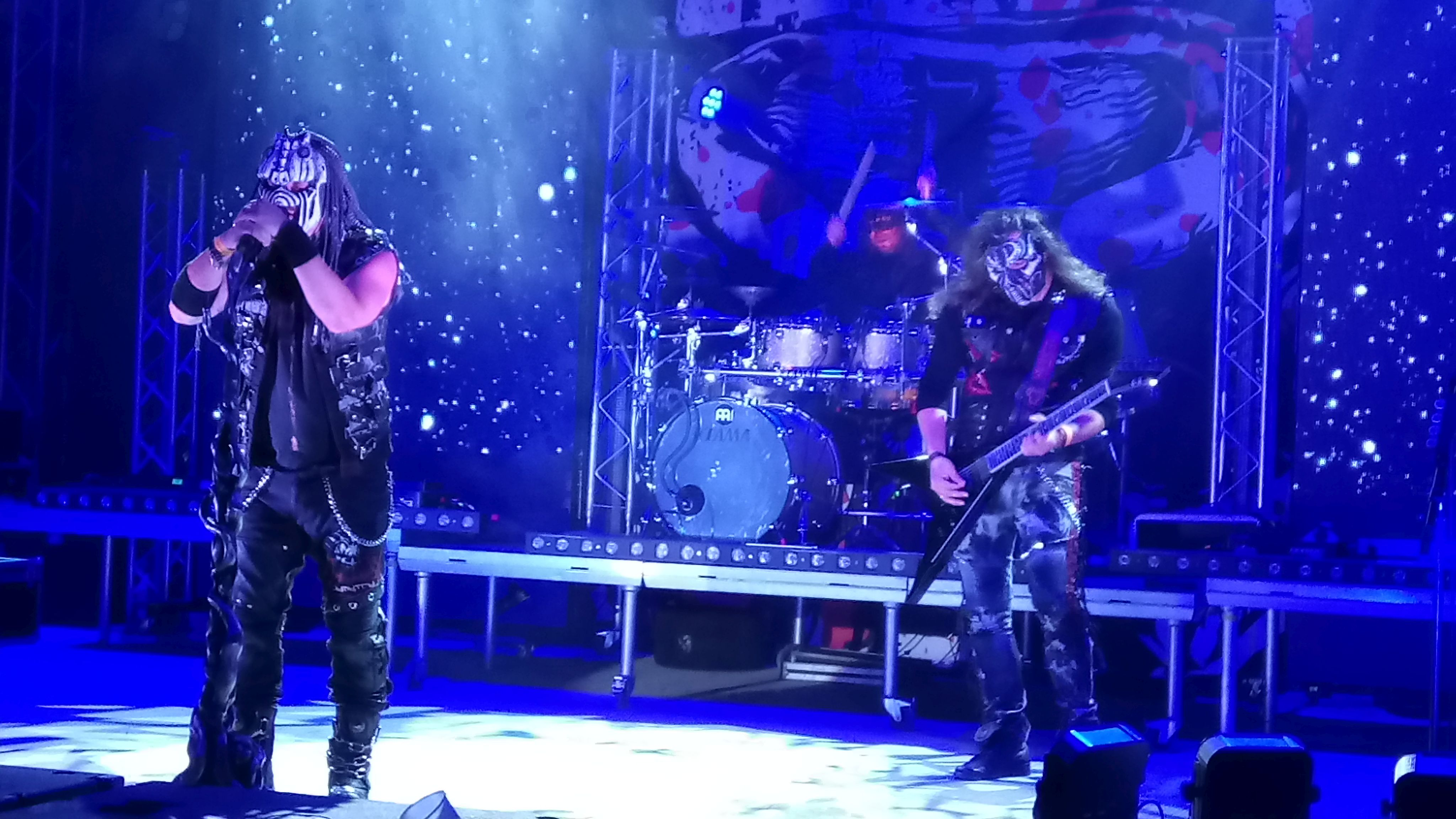
- Dymytry performing in 2017

Background information
- Also known as: DM3
- Origin: Prague, Czech Republic
- Genres: Psy-core
- Years active: 2003–present
- Labels: Dymytry; Metalgate; Alfedus; Open Media; 2P Production; AFM
- Members: Václav Bárta; Jiří Urban Jr.; Artur Michajlov; Jan Görgel; Miloš Meier; Miloš Meier
- Past members: Jan Macků; Ondřej Černý; Rudolf Neumann; Marek Bero; Petr Štochl; Lukáš Pavlík; Marek Fryčák; Michal Chalupka; Eduard Štěpánek
- Website: dymytry.cz

Dymytry is a Czech metal band formed in 2003 in Prague by Jiří "Dymo" Urban. While performing, members of Dymytry wear masks with insect motifs. The band's name is based on a Russian locomotive. Since 2025, the band has used the name Dymytry Paradox for English-language albums.

In the 2017 Český slavík poll, they were ranked in sixth place, and they achieved second place in that year's Žebřík Music Awards.

As of 2026, the band consists of Urban and Jan "Gorgy" Görgel on guitars, Artur "R2R" Michajlov on bass, Miloš "Mildor" Meier on drums, and Václav "Noid" Bárta on vocals. They have released ten studio albums (three in English), eight EPs (three split with Hämatom), four live albums, and two compilation sets.

== History ==
=== Beginnings: 2003–2009 ===
Dymytry was formed in 2003 by vocalist Ondřej Černý, guitarists Jiří "Dymo" Urban (son of Jiří Urban, founder of Arakain) and Rudolf "Dr. Molitanov" Neumann, bassist Petr "Ozz" Štochl, and drummer Michal "Chalimero" Chalupka. They issued the demo Promo a year later—their only release with Černý on vocals. In 2005, after Černý's departure, the band hired Jan "Protheus" Macků to take his place. Around this time, the band began wearing insect-themed masks while performing, based on Macků's suggestion.

Dymytry's debut EP, titled Psy-core, came out in 2006, and the band began to gain prominence, as they frequently opened for Arakain. In 2008, Artur "R2R" Michajlov replaced Štochl on bass. A year later, drummer Chalupka left, and his spot was taken by Miloš "Mildor" Meier.

=== First albums, touring with Arakain: 2010–2015 ===
In 2010, Dymytry released their debut full-length album, titled Neser. A year later, they made their first appearance at the Masters of Rock festival, on the Ronnie James Dio Stage.

In 2012, the band issued their second studio album, Neonarcis. Homodlak followed in 2014, and they embarked on the Arakain Dymytry Tour 2014, which covered the Czech Republic and Slovakia. A live recording from this tour was released later that year, also titled Arakain Dymytry Tour 2014, and it included the singles "Jedna krev", "Bouřlivá krev", and "Žít svůj sen", which the two bands co-wrote and recorded together.

In 2015, Dymytry issued the EP Z pekla and launched their first headlining tour, Psy-core Tour 2015. At the end of the year, they released their first live DVD, titled Živě 2015.

=== First international performances: 2016–2017 ===
In 2016, the band published their fourth studio album, Agronaut, and embarked on another tour with Arakain. The two bands again released a live record, titled Arakain/Dymytry – Live 2016, which included the jointly written song "Do stejný řeky".

Dymytry's second headlining tour, Krby Kamna Turyna Tour 2017, followed a year later. The band released the EP Sedmero krkavců while on tour.

Also in 2017, Dymytry announced that they would be performing in Germany in 2018 as openers for the metal band Hämatom—their first foray beyond the borders of the Czech Republic and Slovakia—and that their lyrics would be sung in English. The band re-recorded the tracks from their last EP with English vocals and released them as the EP United We Stand the same year. In July, Dymytry performed once more at the Masters of Rock festival.

Later that year, the band went on their Svijany Tour 2017, and this was followed by the release of the double-album compilation Reser, which included remastered tracks from Neser, re-recorded tracks from Psy-core, all the band's singles to date, as well as the previously unreleased single "Iluze".

=== 15-year anniversary: 2018–2019 ===
In February 2018, Dymytry launched their 15-year anniversary tour, titled 15 let pod maskou, with the showcase Koncert Monstrum taking place in Prague on 23 March. The tour featured guests Hämatom during several dates. This was followed in the fall by the promised international tour with Hämatom, and in December, Dymytry held the mini-tour Monstrum II, which featured a guest performance by Hämatom in Prague. Dymytry released their second English-language EP, Beast from the East, at the end of 2018.

In March 2019, Dymytry embarked on their S nadějí Tour 2019. In October, they issued their next full-length album, Revolter, and followed it with the Revolter Tour 2019.

=== Departure of Protheus and new vocalist: 2022–present ===
In 2022, Dymytry released an all-English version of Revolter, titled Revolt, sung by Alen "A.L." Ljubić. They also issued an album of new material, titled Pharmageddon. A year later, they published two split EPs with Hämatom: Víc Než Bůh and Pin Me Down.

In September 2023, the band announced that vocalist Jan "Protheus" Macků would be departing to pursue a solo career following their 20th-anniversary performance at Prague's O2 Arena. Later that year, they released the compilation 20 let 2003–2023. In December, the band presented their new vocalist, Václav "Noid" Bárta.

In 2024, Dymytry released the English-language album Five Angry Men, again with Ljubić on vocals, and they subsequently embarked on their first international headlining tour to promote it. Later in 2024, they published another studio album, this one with Czech vocals by Noid, titled V Dobrým I Zlým.

== Band members ==
Current

- Jiří "Dymo" Urban – guitar (2003–present)
- Artur "R2R" Michajlov – bass (2008–present)
- Jan "Gorgy" Görgel – guitar (2009–present)
- Miloš "Mildor" Meier – drums (2009–present)
- Václav "Noid" Bárta – vocals (2023–present)

Past

- Ondřej Černý – vocals (2003–2005)
- Petr "Ozz" Štochl – bass (2003–2006)
- Michal "Chalimero" Chalupka – drums (2003–2007)
- Rudolf "Dr. Molitanov" Neumann – guitar (2003–2009)
- Jan "Protheus" Macků – vocals (2005–2023)
- Marek Bero – bass (2007–2008)
- Lukáš "HellBoy" Pavlík – drums (2007–2009)
- Marek Fryčák – drums (2009)
- Eduard Štěpánek – drums (subbed for Miloš Meier, 2010–2017)

Dymytry at Metal Frenzy open air 2026

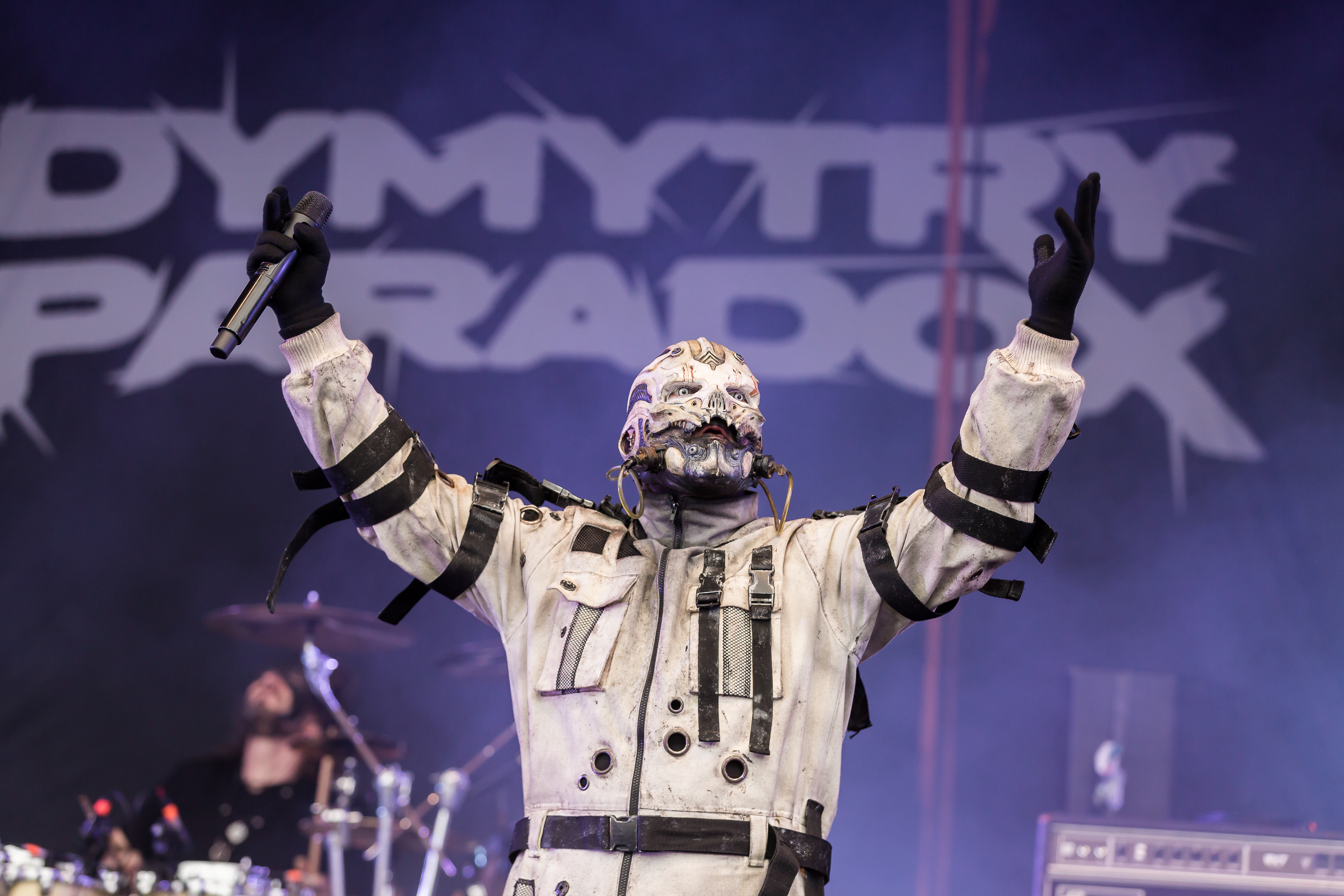
Alen "A.L." Ljubić, vocals

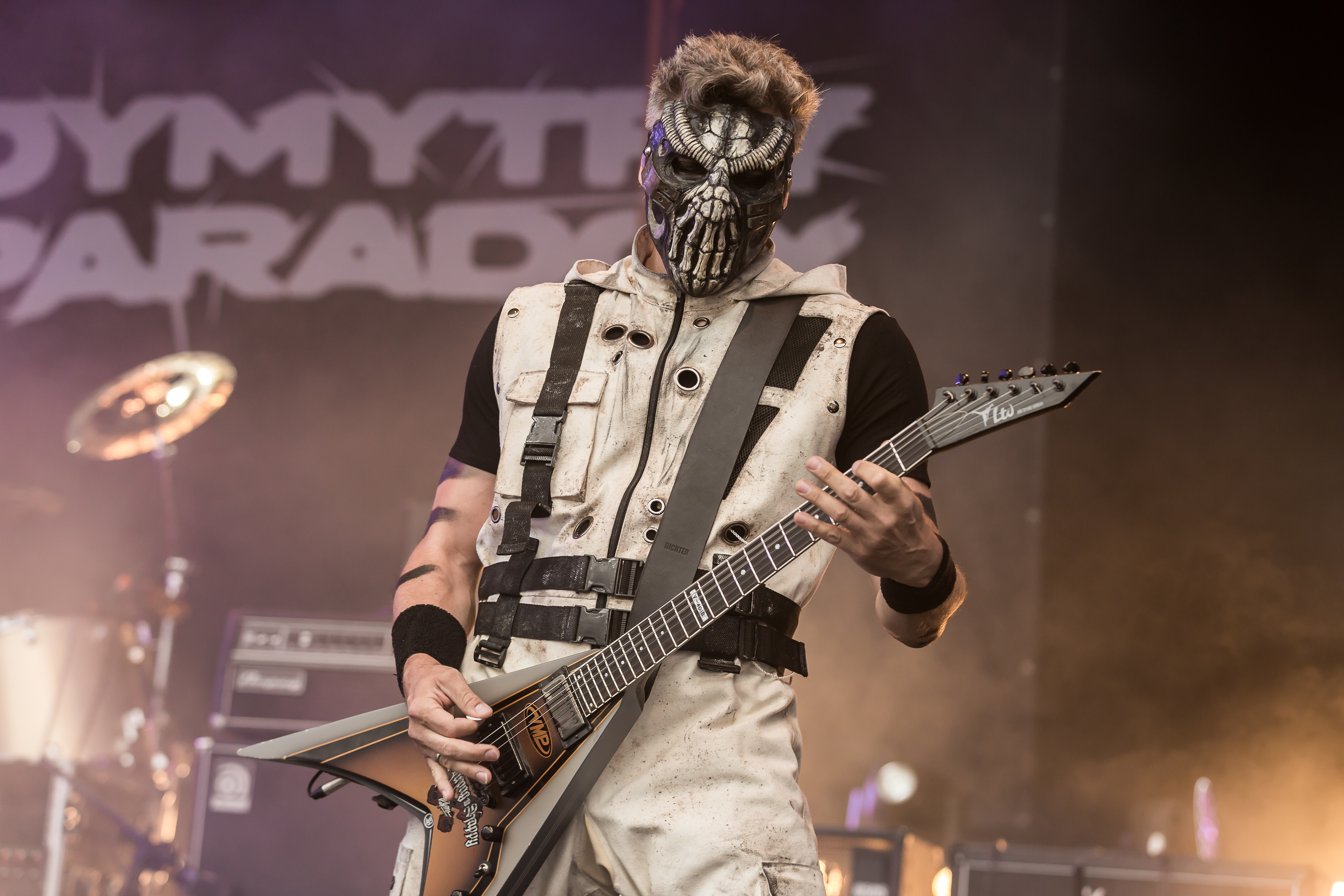
Jiří "Dymo" Urban, guitar

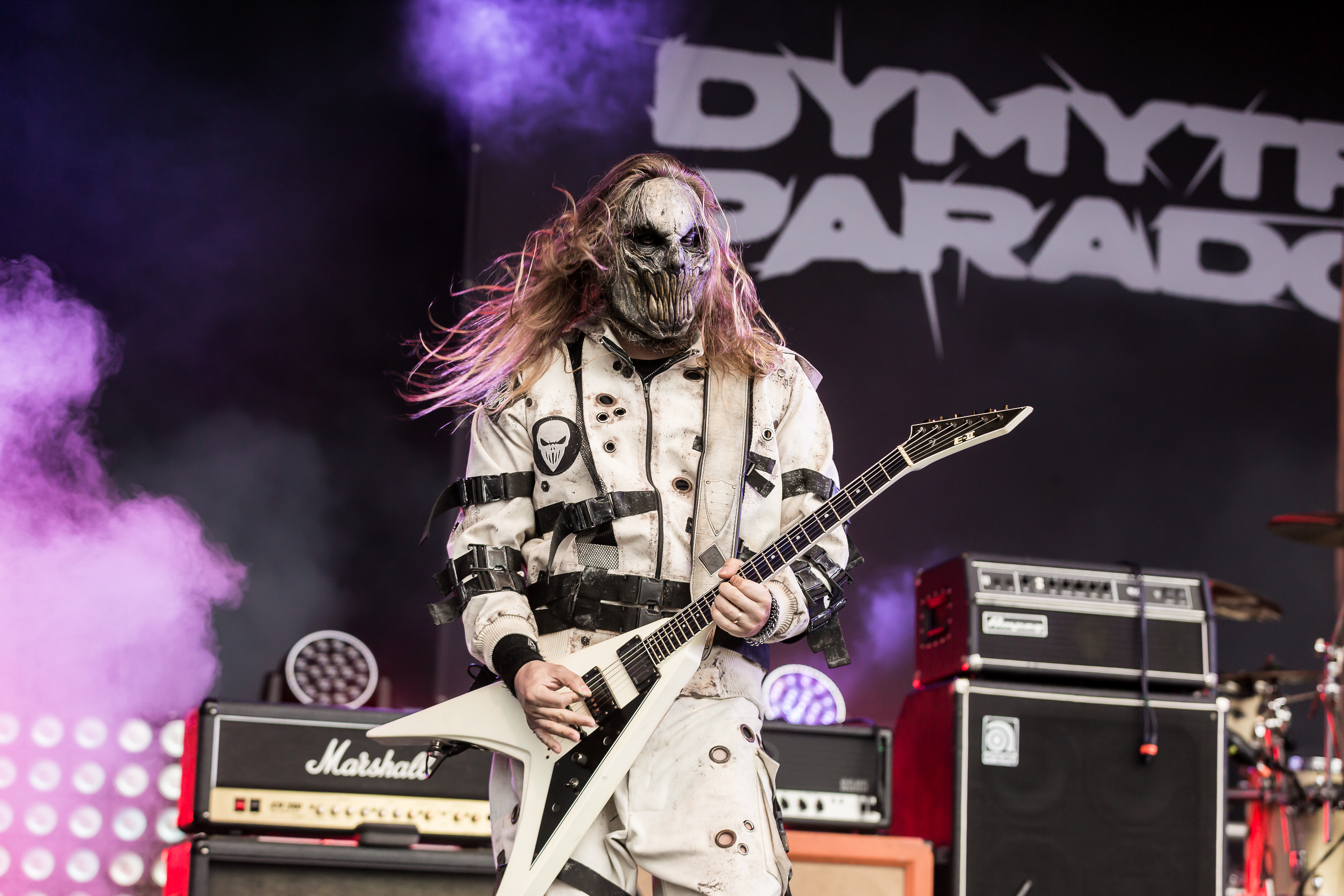
Jan "Gorgy" Görgel, guitar

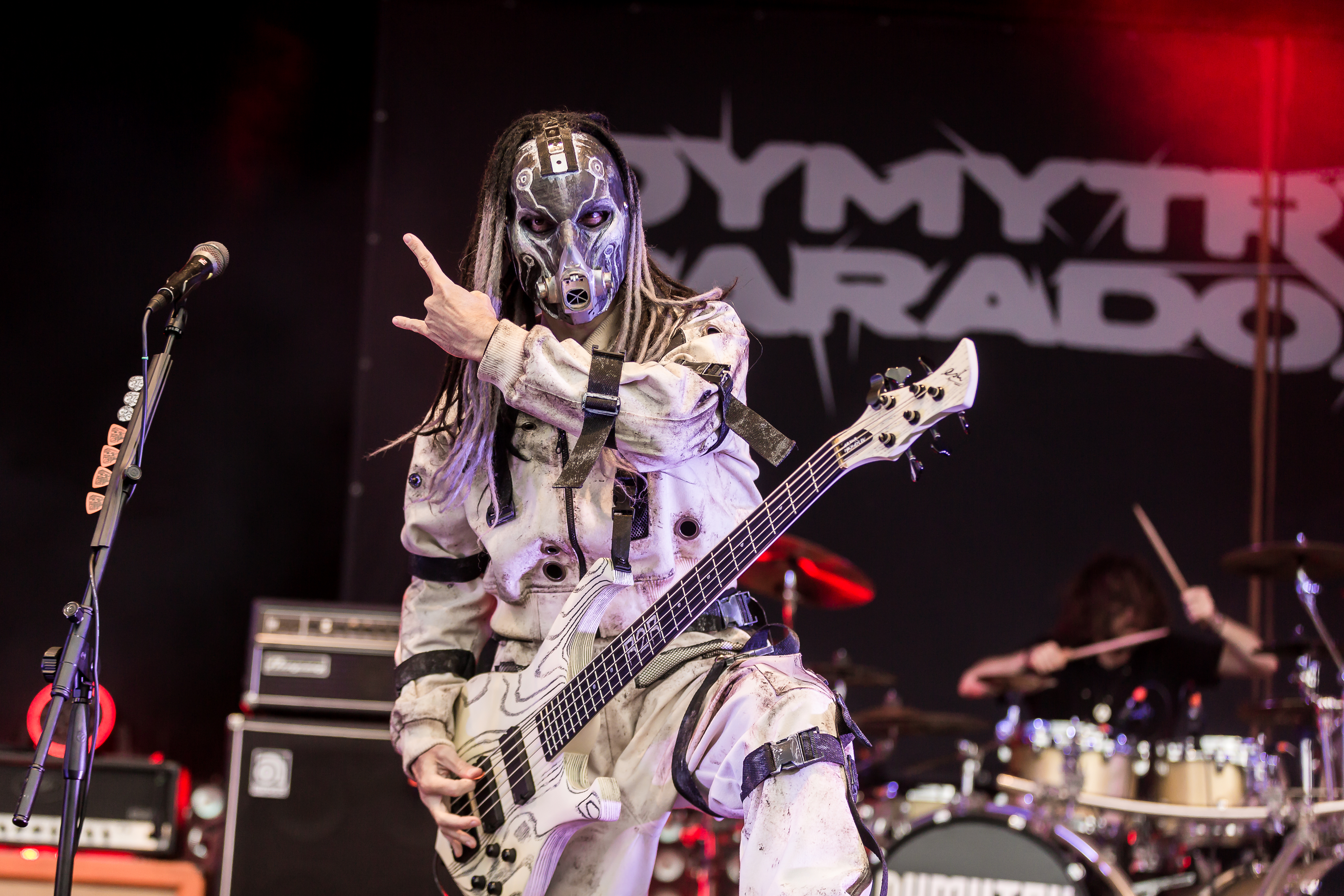
Artur "R2R" Michajlov, bass

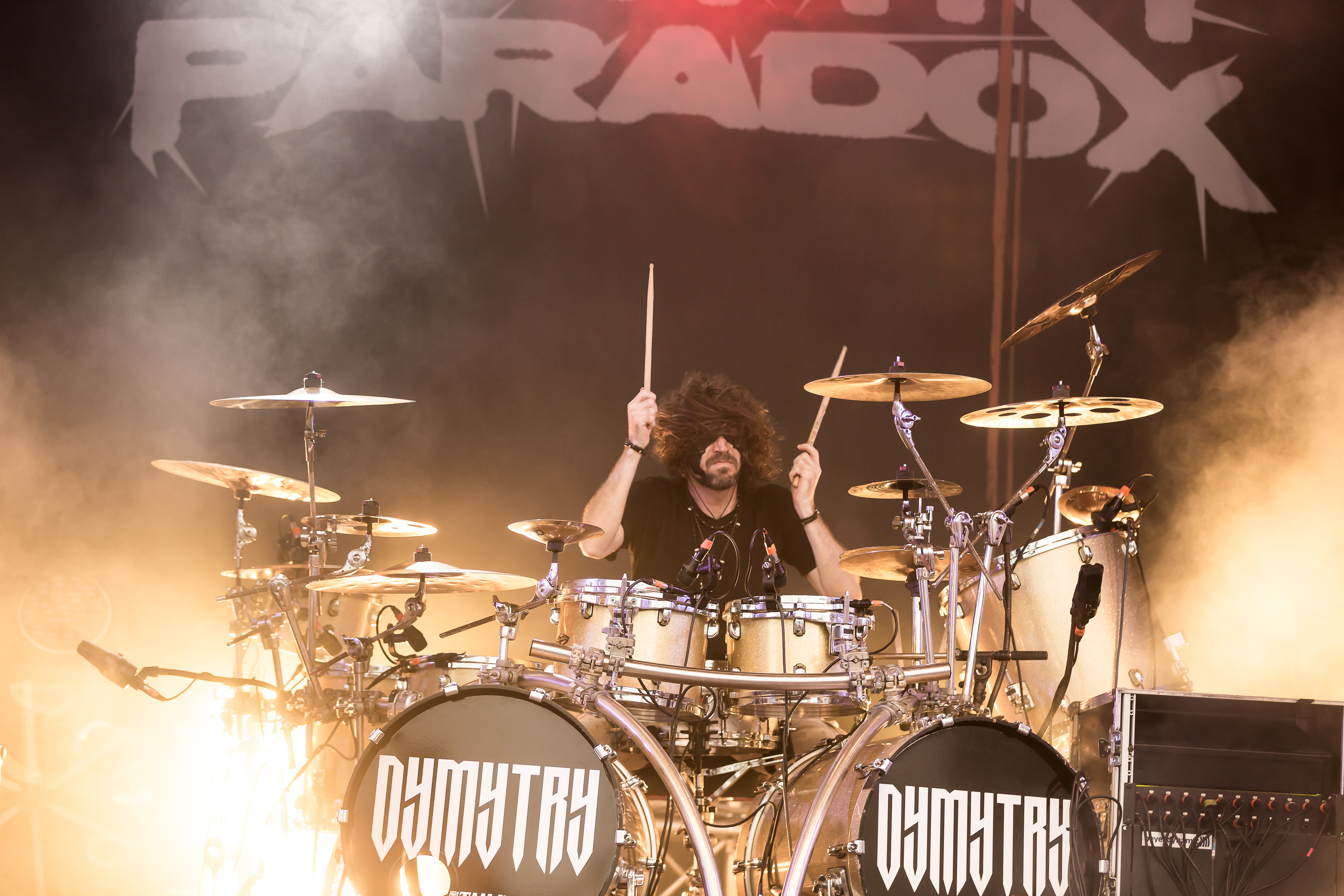
Miloš "Mildor" Meier, drums

Timeline

== Discography ==
Studio albums

- Neser (2010)
- Neonarcis (2012)
- Homodlak (2014)
- Agronaut (2016)
- Revolter (2019)
- Revolt (2022)
- Pharmageddon (2022)
- Five Angry Men (2024)
- V Dobrým I Zlým (2024)
- Born from Chaos (2026)

EPs

- Psy-core (2006)
- Z pekla (2015
- Sedmero krkavců (2017)
- United We Stand (2017)
- Beast from the East (2018)
- Behind the Mask (split with Hämatom, 2018)
- Víc Než Bůh (split with Hämatom, 2023)
- Pin Me Down (split with Hämatom, 2023)

Live albums

- Živě 2015 (2015)
- Arakain/Dymytry – Live 2016 (2016)
- Monstrum žije! (2018)

Compilations

- Reser (2017)
- 20 let 2003–2023 (2023)

DVDs

- Arakain Dymytry Tour 2014 (2014)
- Živě 2015 (2015)
- Monstrum žije! (2018)

Demos

- Promo (2004)
- Black (2008)
