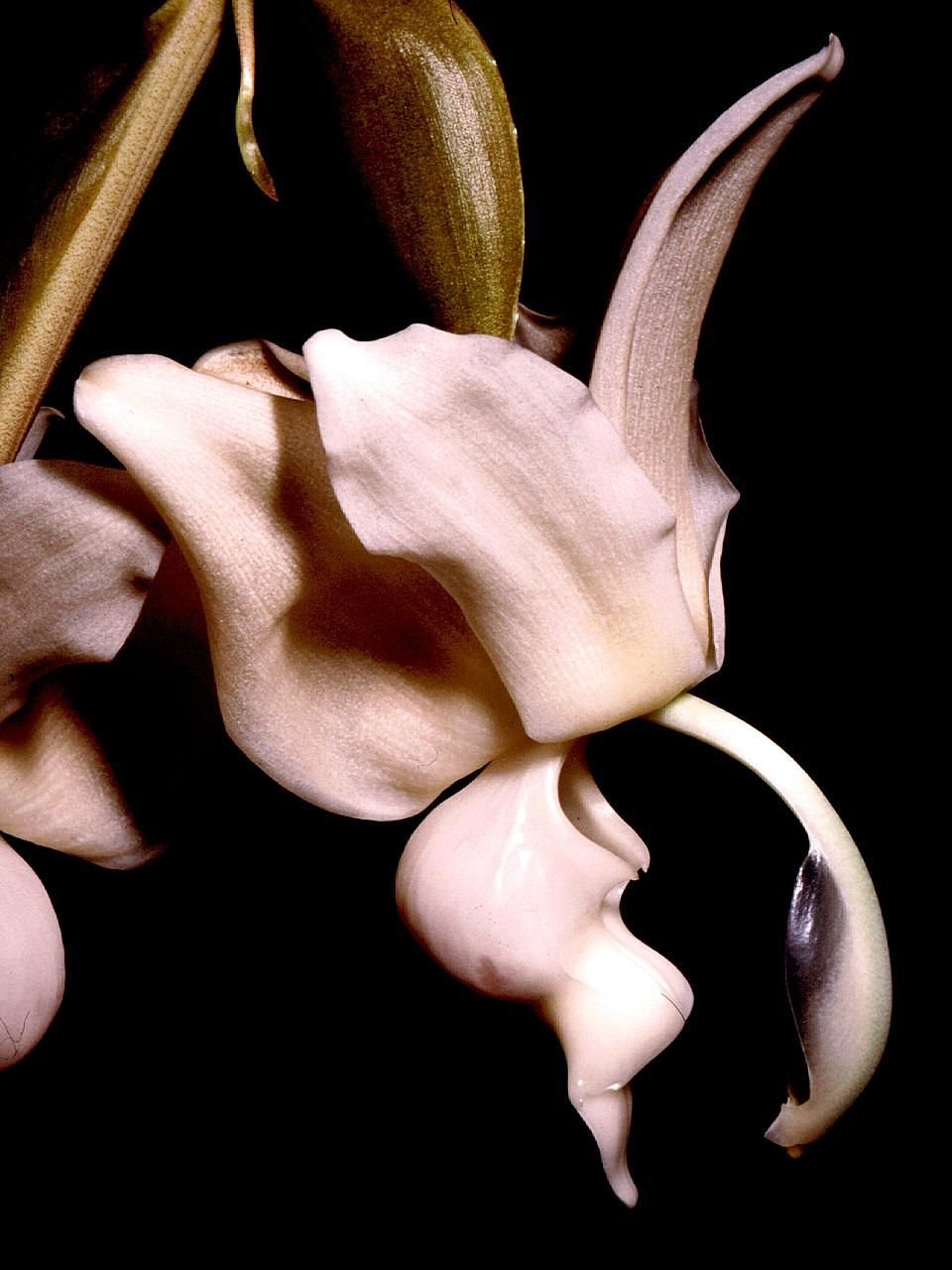
- Stanhopea reichenbachiana flower

Scientific classification
- Kingdom: Plantae
- Clade: Tracheophytes
- Clade: Angiosperms
- Clade: Monocots
- Order: Asparagales
- Family: Orchidaceae
- Subfamily: Epidendroideae
- Genus: Stanhopea
- Species: S. reichenbachiana

Binomial name
- Stanhopea reichenbachiana Roezl ex Rchb. f.

Synonyms
- Stanhopea lowii Rolfe

= Stanhopea reichenbachiana =

Species of orchid

Stanhopea reichenbachiana is a species of orchid occurring from western Colombia to Ecuador. It is named for the botanists Philip Henry Stanhope, 4th Earl Stanhope and Heinrich Gustav Reichenbach.
