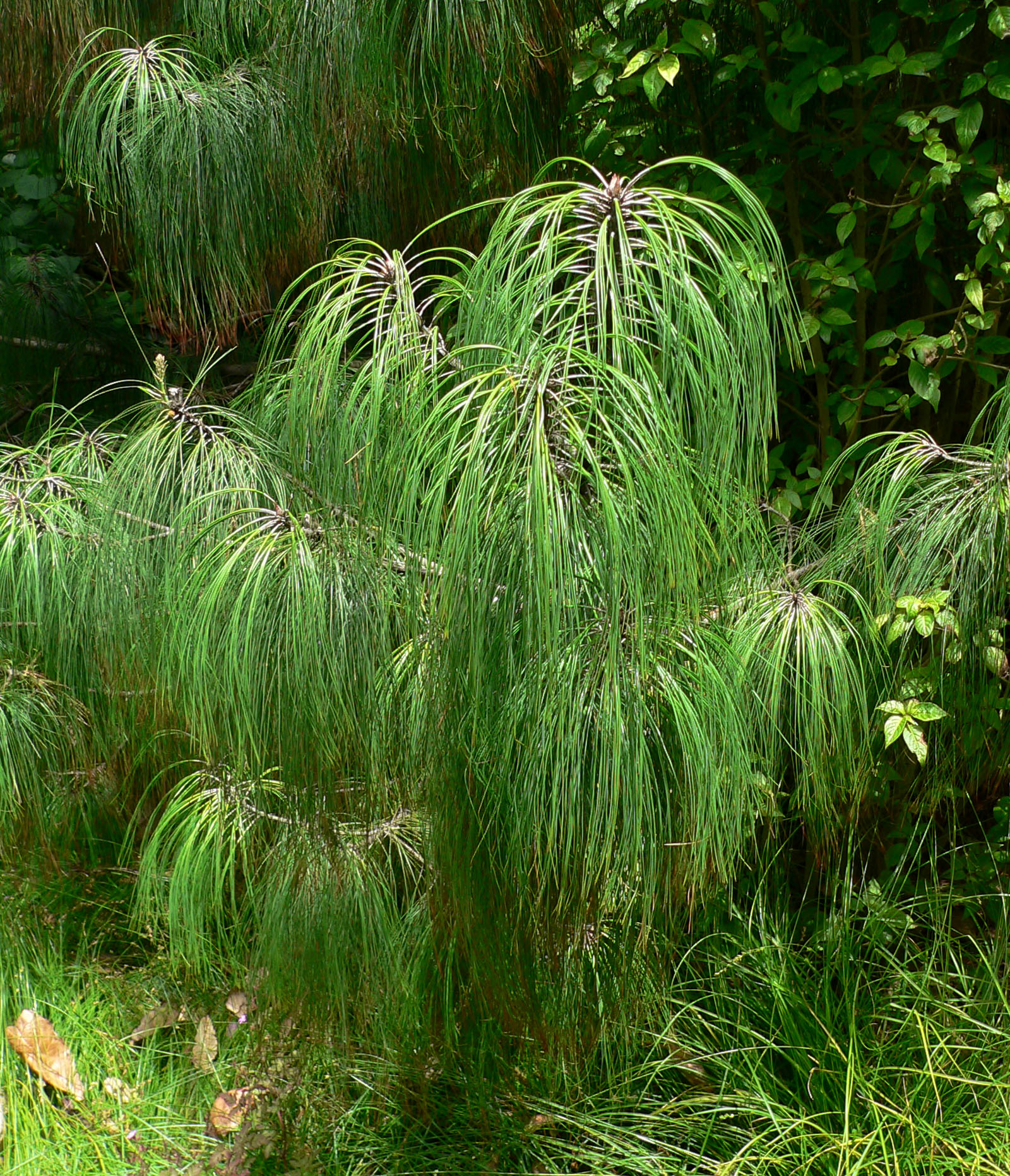
- var. apulcensis in cultivation

Conservation status
- Least Concern (IUCN 3.1)

Scientific classification
- Kingdom: Plantae
- Clade: Embryophytes
- Clade: Tracheophytes
- Clade: Spermatophytes
- Clade: Gymnospermae
- Division: Pinophyta
- Class: Pinopsida
- Order: Pinales
- Family: Pinaceae
- Genus: Pinus
- Subgenus: P. subg. Pinus
- Section: P. sect. Trifoliae
- Subsection: P. subsect. Ponderosae
- Species: P. pseudostrobus

Binomial name
- Pinus pseudostrobus Lindl.
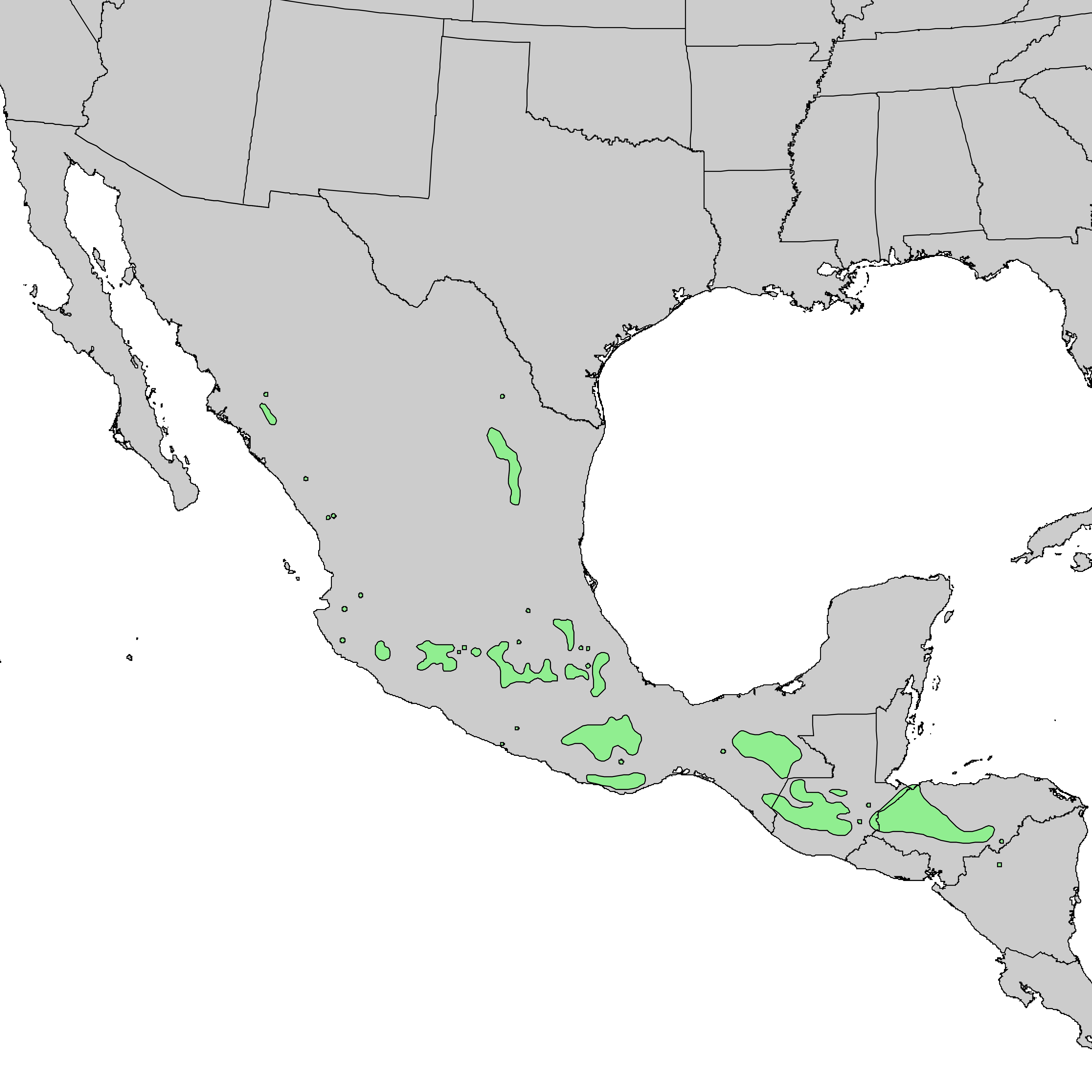
- Natural range of Pinus pseudostrobus. Pinus pseudostrobus is also found in El Salvador.

Synonyms
- Pinus angulata Roezl Pinus alpucensis Lindl. Pinus astecaensis Roezl ex Gordon Pinus coatepecensis (Martínez)Gaussen Pinus estevezii (Martínez) J.P.Perry Pinus heteromorpha Roezl Pinus nubicola J.P.Perry Pinus oaxana Mirov Pinus orizabae Gordon Pinus prasina Roezl Pinus protuberans Roezl Pinus regeliana Roezl Pinus yecorensis Debreczy & I.Ràcz

= Pinus pseudostrobus =

Species of conifer

Pinus pseudostrobus, known in English as the smooth-bark Mexican pine and in Spanish as chamite or pacingo, is a tree found in forests of Mexico and Central America. It is 8 to 25 metres (26 to 82 ft) tall with a dense and round top.It is threatened by logging and wood harvesting. The bark is brown and fissured and smooth when young. It is subject to ex situ conservation. It grows at altitudes between 850 and 3,250 metres (2,790 and 10,660 ft). from 26° to 15° north latitude, from Sinaloa, Mexico to Nicaragua and Honduras. It occurs within a rainfall regime that rains mostly in summer.

In some forested areas like southern Nuevo León Pinus pseudostrobus is the tree with largest volume per hectare.

English botanist John Lindley described the species in 1839. It is divided into Pinus pseudostrobus var.apulcensis (Lindl.)Shaw (Apulco pine), Pinus pseudostrobus f.protuberans Martínez and Pinus pseudostrobus var.pseudostrobus.

It has been introduced in New Zealand near sea level and has done well.

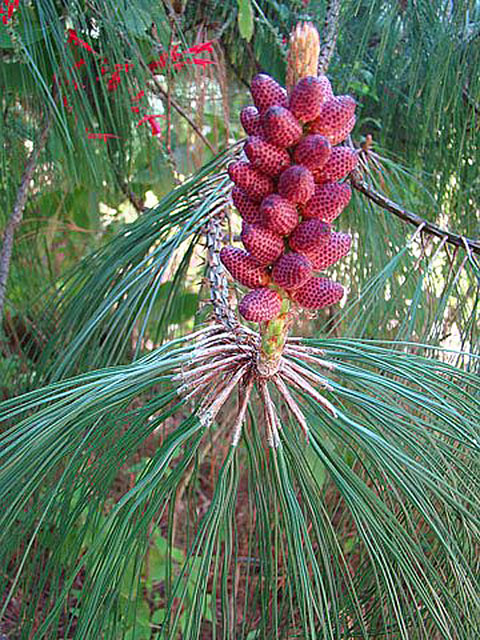
Male cones at San Francisco Botanical Garden

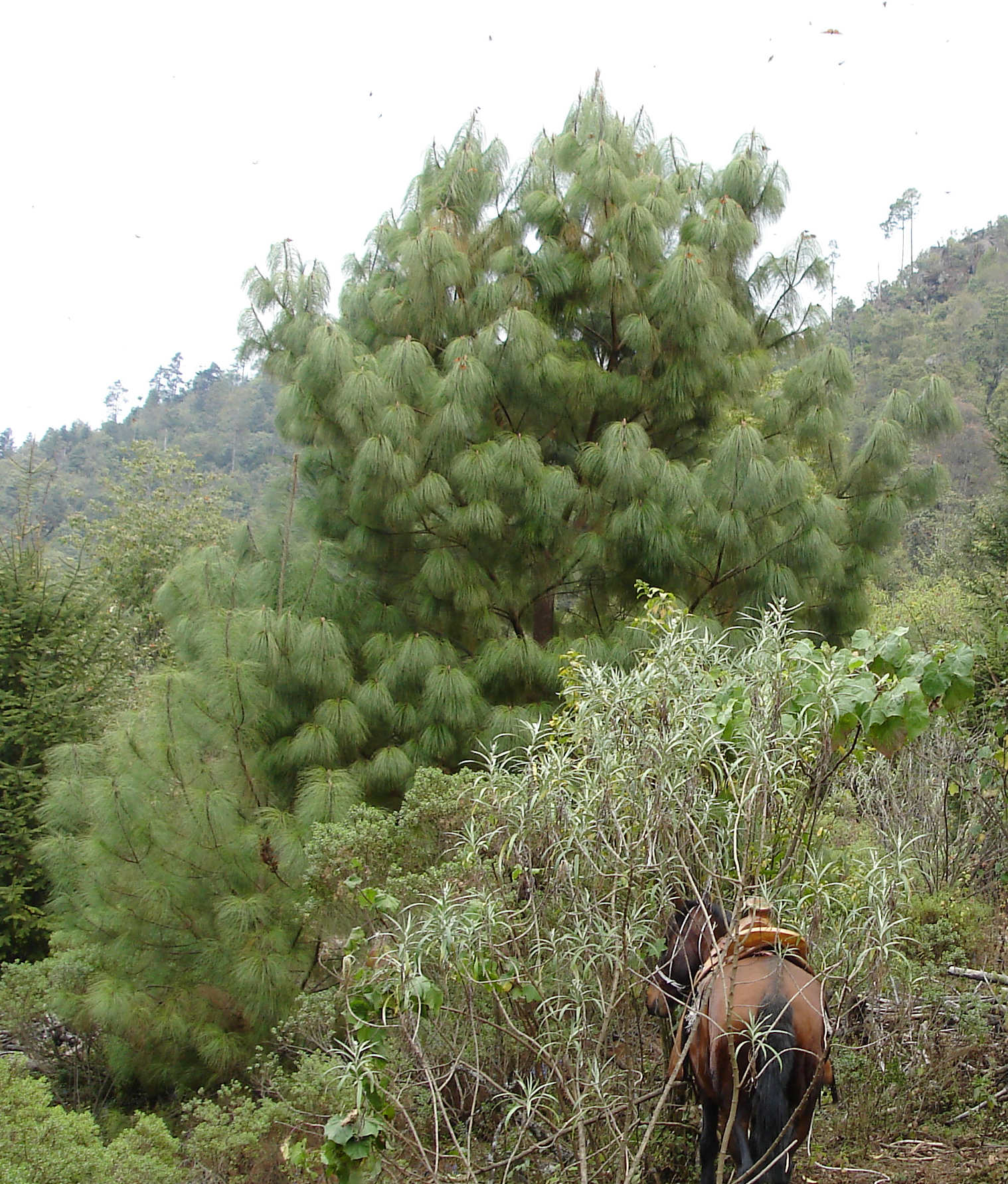
Pinus pseudostrobus, Cerro Pelón, Mexico
