= Jack Murphy (writer) =

Lyricist and composer

Jack Murphy is a lyricist and composer. He has written the lyrics to several international musicals, such as Death Note: The Musical and The Civil War, the latter of which garnered him a Tony Nomination for Best Score. He has collaborated with composer Frank Wildhorn on many projects.

== Works ==
- Silver Dollar (1997) – lyrics by: Mary Bracken Phillips;
- The Civil War (1998) – composition by: Frank Wildhorn and playwright by Frank Wildhorn and Gregory Boyd
- Swing! (1999) – lyricist for the songs "I'm Gonna Love You Tonight" and "Boogie Woogie Country"
- Waiting for the Moon (2005) – composition by: Frank Wildhorn; World Premiere: Lenape Performing Arts Center, July 2005. Revived in 2012 as Zelda – An American Love Story at the Flat Rock Playhouse, then as Scott & Zelda in 2015 at Tokyo, Japan.
- Rudolf (2006) – music by: Frank Wildhorn, additional lyrics by Nan Knighton
- Carmen (2008) – composition by: Frank Wildhorn; Premiere in Prague, Czech Republic.
- The Count of Monte Cristo (2009) – composition by: Frank Wildhorn; World Premiere: Theater St. Gallen, March 2009.
- Mitsuko (2011) – written together with Frank Wildhorn and Shuichiro Koike as a musical concert, Vienna in 2005; Tokyo and Osaka, Japan in 2011.
- Death Note: The Musical (2015) – composition by: Frank Wildhorn; translated into Korean and Japanese.
- Wonderland (2009) – composition by: Frank Wildhorn
- Mata Hari (2016) - composition by: Frank Wildhorn; translated into Korean and Japanese
- The Man Who Laughs (2018) - composition by: Frank Wildhorn; Art Hall Opera Theater, Seoul, 10 July.
