= Miloš Meier =

Czech drummer (born 1984)

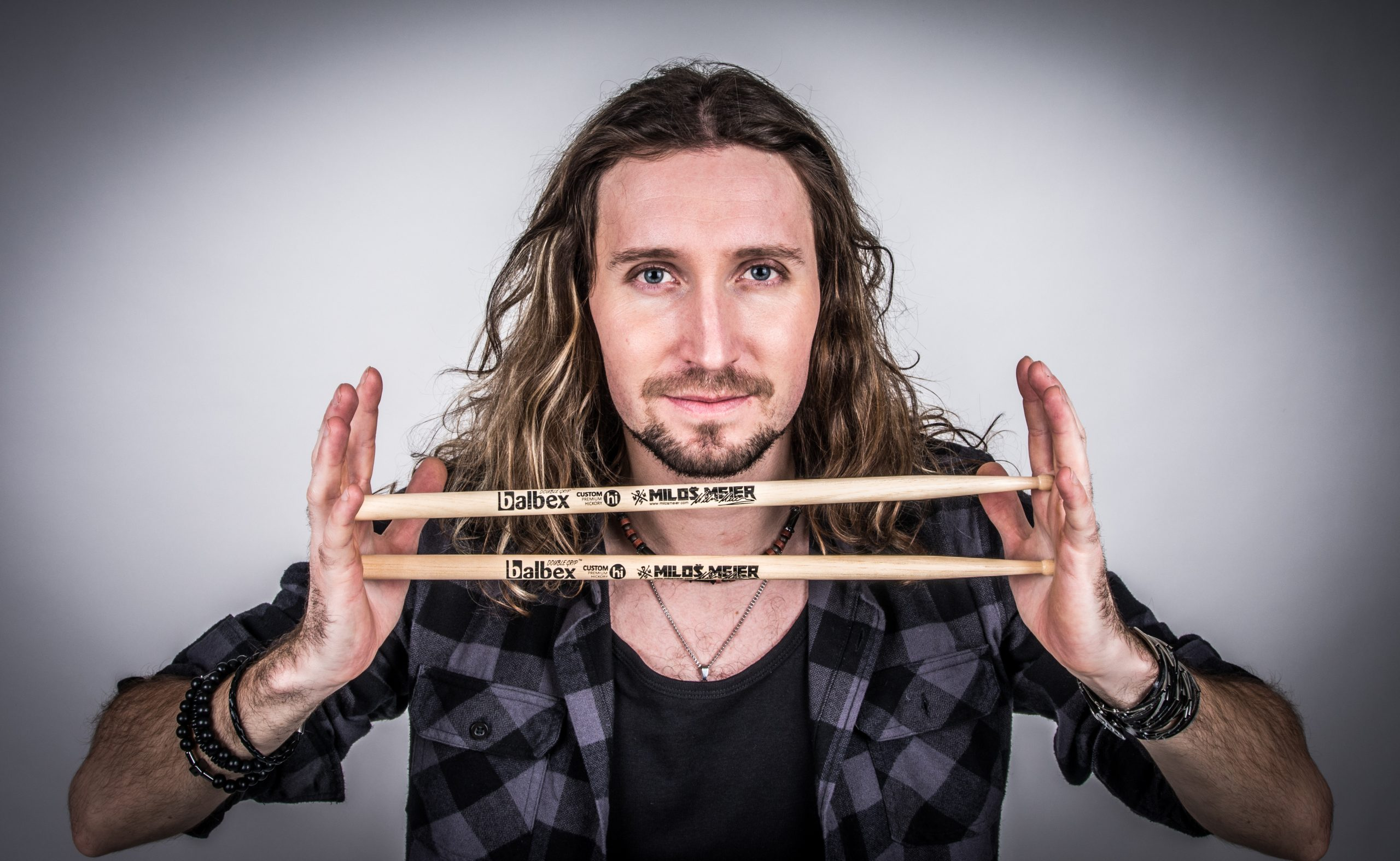

Background information
- Born: 17 June 1984 (age 42); Jihlava, Czechoslovakia
- Genres: hard rock, heavy metal, pop, jazz
- Occupation: Musician
- Instruments: Drums, percussion
- Website: www.milosmeier.com

Miloš Meier (born 17 June 1984 in Jihlava, Czech Republic) is a Czech drummer. In a survey of listeners and readers of Radio Beat and magazine Rock & Pop, he was selected as a member of the Czech supergroup together with Michal Pavlíček, Kamil Střihavka, Vladimir Kulhánek, Roman Dragoun and Jan Hrubý.

== Biography ==
Miloš Meier comes from musical a family; his stepmother is a singer, his brother is also a drummer and his father leads a brass orchestra, in which Meier performed until he was 16. The first musical instrument that he started to play was the piano. During his orchestra years he also played with local rock and metal bands Invasion of Privacy and Eclipse of a Shadow.

At the age of fifteen he left to Prague to study at the Prague Conservatory. Around this time he became interested in diverse musical styles including jazz, fusion, and funk. He played with a large number of different bands, including death metal artist Tortharry, with whom he recorded an album, Bon Jovi and Judas Priest tribute bands, and Aneta Langerová's band. Intensive drumming led to problems with his tendons and muscles in his hands, and he had to stop playing the drums for six months.

After his recovery, at the age of 19 he successfully auditioned for BSP, a Czech supergroup consisting of Ota Balage, Kamil Střihavka, and Michal Pavlíček, with whom he has been playing ever since. In 2009 he recorded the album Neser ('Don't Fuck With Me') with Czech metal band Dymytry, who he later joined. He also plays in the bands Noid, Story, and Eleison, as well as various other musical projects.

In 2009 he performed at the La Rioja Drumming Festival in Spain.

He organizes drumming workshops called Drumming Syndrome.

== Discography ==
Dymytry

- Neser! (2010)
- Neonarcis (2012)
- Homodlak (2014)
- Agronaut (2016)
- "Sedmero krkavců" (2017)
- "United We Stand" (2017)
- "Reser" (2017)
- "S nadějí" (2018, single)
- "Revolter" (2019)
- "Černí andělé" (2020, metal cover)

Others

- Tortharry – White (2003)
- Petr Poláček & Iluze (2006)
- Michal Pavlíček – Beatová síň slávy (Beat Hall of Fame) (CD, DVD, 8.6. 2006)
- B.S.P. – Live in Retro Music Hall – (DVD, 2006)
- Gazely – Gazely (Gazelles) (CD, 2006)
- Viktoria – Velvet (CD, 2008)
- Kamil Střihavka & Leaders! – 365 (CD, 2008)
- Michal Pavlíček – muzikál Dáma s Kaméliemi (musical Lady with Camellias) (2008)
- Michal Pavlíček – Srdeční záležitosti (Heart Matters) (3 CD, 2010)
- Noid – Rány (Wounds) (CD, 2012)
- Stroy – "Adam Reborn" (2014)
- Stroy – "Like It Or Not!" (EP, 2015)

Drumming Syndrome

- Drumming Syndrome – Drum Show (DVD, 2012)
- 10th Anniversary Compilation - (USB, 2022)
