= Otvovice =

- Municipality
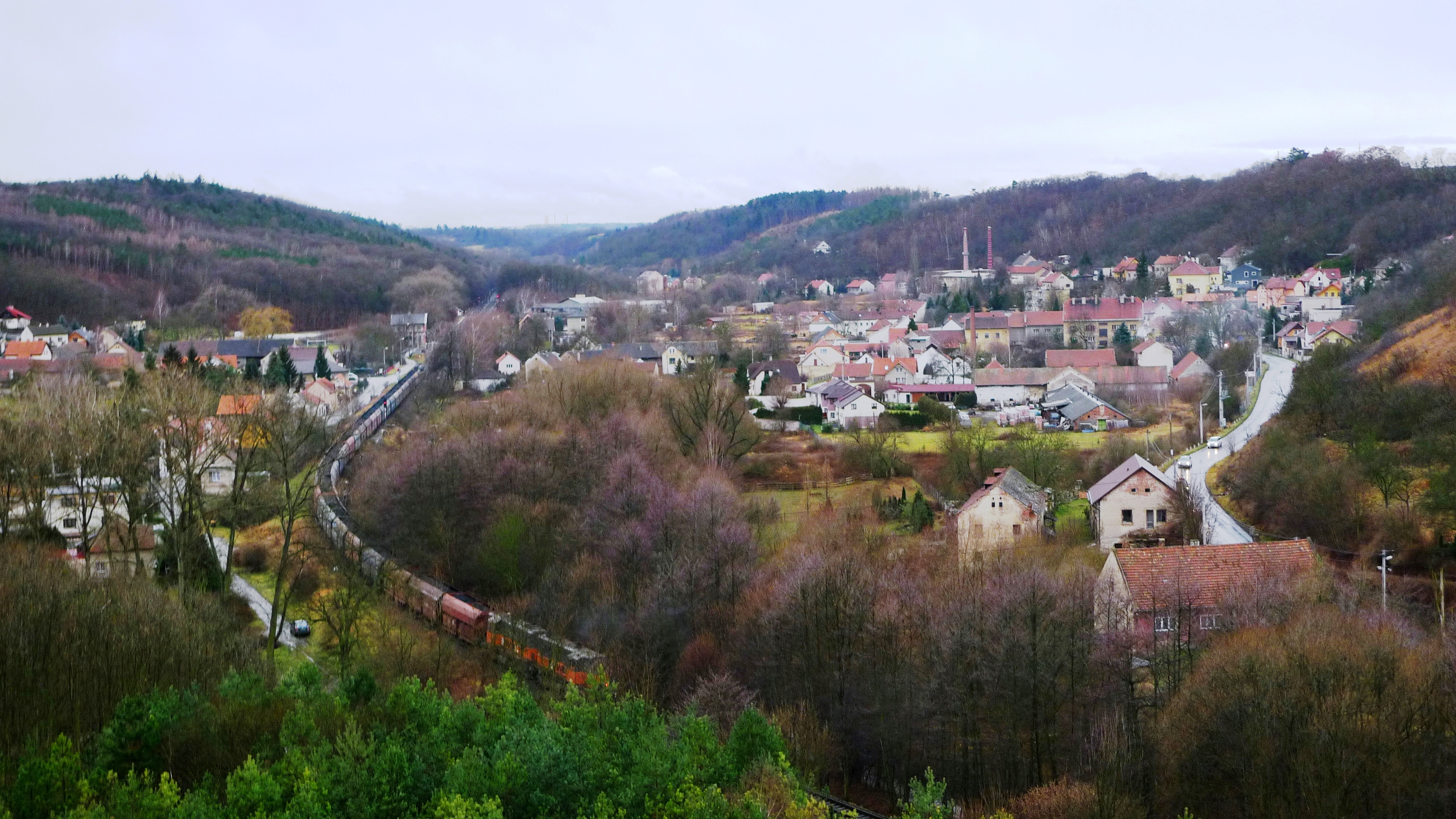
- General view of Otvovice

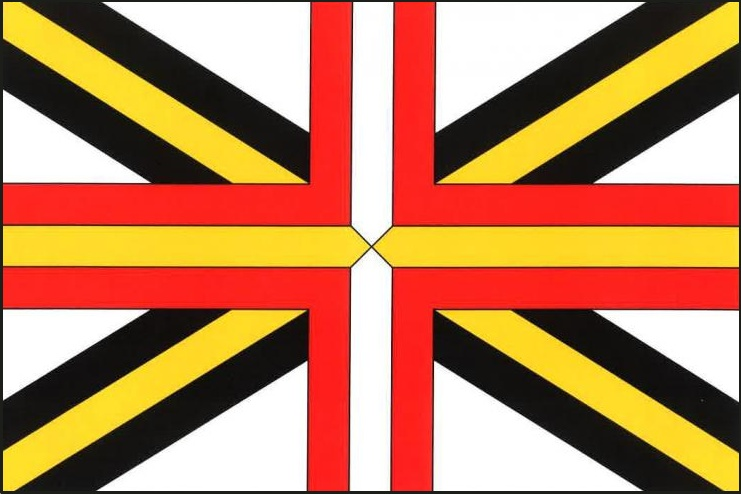
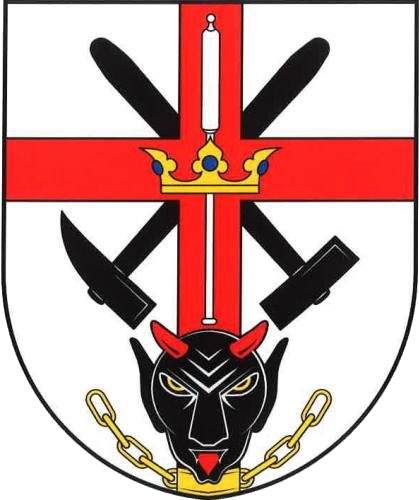
- Flag Coat of arms

- Location in the Czech Republic
- Coordinates: 50°12′42″N 14°16′23″E
- Country: Czech Republic
- Region: Central Bohemian
- District: Kladno
- First mentioned: 1228

Area
  - Total: 6.17 km^{2} (2.38 sq mi)
- Elevation: 220 m (720 ft)

Population (2026-01-01)
  - Total: 789
  - Density: 128/km^{2} (331/sq mi)
- Time zone: UTC+1 (CET)
  - Summer (DST): UTC+2 (CEST)
- Postal code: 273 27
- Website: www.otvovice.cz

Otvovice is a municipality and village in Kladno District in the Central Bohemian Region of the Czech Republic. It has about 800 inhabitants.

== Demographics ==
Historical population
Year	Pop.	±%
1869	799	—
1880	901	+12.8%
1890	960	+6.5%
1900	966	+0.6%
1910	1,085	+12.3%
1921	1,219	+12.4%
1930	1,242	+1.9%
1950	962	−22.5%
1961	957	−0.5%
1970	864	−9.7%
1980	779	−9.8%
1991	718	−7.8%
2001	683	−4.9%
2011	793	+16.1%
2021	850	+7.2%
Source: Censuses

== Notable people ==
- Lucie Bílá (born 1966), singer
