= Zoo (Czech TV series) =

- Genre: Comedy
- Country of origin: Czech Republic
- Original language: Czech
- No. of seasons: 4
- No. of episodes: 224

Production
- Running time: 60 minutes

Original release
- Network: Prima televize
- Release: January 13, 2022 – 2024

Zoo is a Czech family, comedy and relationship TV series set in a zoo, which premiered on January 13, 2022, on the Prima televize. It replaced the Slunečná series.

== Cast ==
- Michaela Pecháčková as Sidonie „Sid“ Anna Novotná
- Eva Burešová as Viktorie „Viki“ / Alex Janečková – main protagonist
- Veronika Freimanová as Ing. Marie Roklová rozená Fišerová
- Štěpán Benoni as Marek „Mára, Mařen(k)a“ Rokl
- Robert Urban as JUDr. Petr Kříž
- Šimon Bilina as kpt. Bc. Adam „Haďák“ Hruška
- Sabina Laurinová as Alice Novotná
- Marek Taclík as Eduard Novotný zemřel
- Jana Švandová as Sidonie Novotná
- Vojtěch Vovesný as Eduard „Ed“ Novotný jr.
- Vladimír Kratina as Raul „Sumec“ Novotný
- Ondřej Pavelka as Mgr. Karel Rokl
- Goran Maiello as Vojtěch Rokl
- Tereza Brodská as JUDr. Danuše Křížová
- David Gránský as Mgr. Albert Polák
- Pavel Nečas as Ing. Lubor Brázda
- Roman Zach as Roman Pekař
- Barbora Černá as Tereza (Tes) Janečková
- Lucie Černá as Izabela (Izy) Janečková
- Marek Němec as Karel (Charlie) Rakušan
- Tomáš Klus as Filip Janda
- Sandra Nováková as Sylva Machyánová
- Sára Milfajtová as Kristýna Martincová
- Milan Šteindler as Herrmann
- Zdeněk Hruška as major Havlíček
