= Horoměřice =

- Municipality
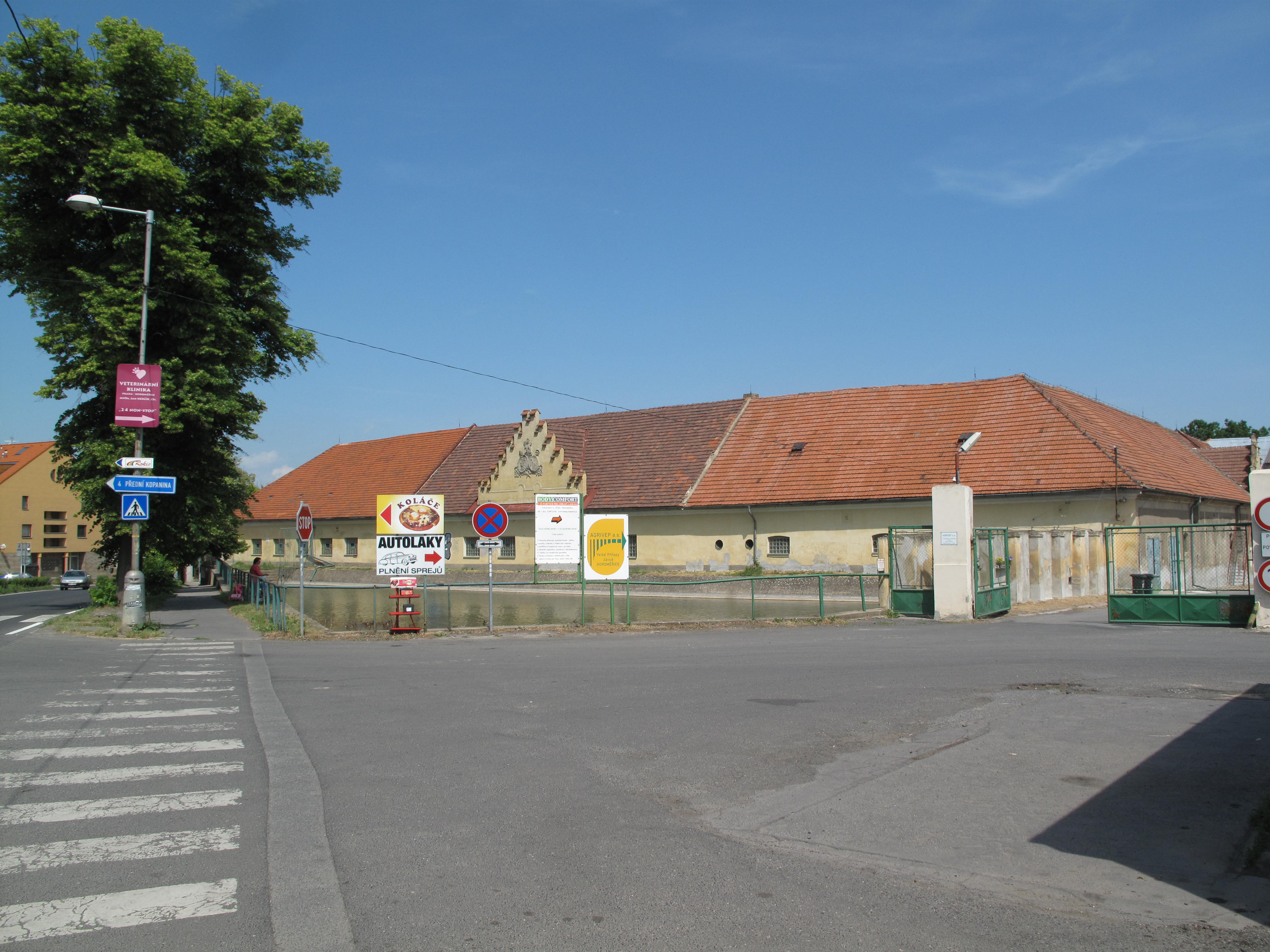
- Horoměřice Castle

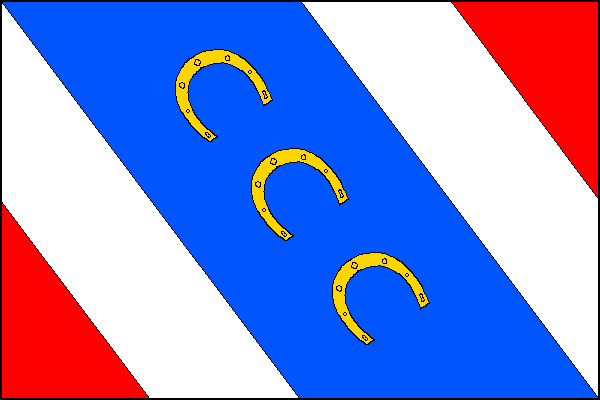
- Flag Coat of arms

- Location in the Czech Republic
- Coordinates: 50°7′54″N 14°20′20″E
- Country: Czech Republic
- Region: Central Bohemian
- District: Prague-West
- First mentioned: 1088

Government
  - Mayor: Jan Herčík

Area
  - Total: 8.05 km^{2} (3.11 sq mi)
- Elevation: 308 m (1,010 ft)

Population (2026-01-01)
  - Total: 5,586
  - Density: 694/km^{2} (1,800/sq mi)
- Time zone: UTC+1 (CET)
  - Summer (DST): UTC+2 (CEST)
- Postal code: 252 62
- Website: www.horomerice.cz

Horoměřice (Czech pronunciation: [ˈɦoromɲɛr̝ɪtsɛ]) is a municipality and village in Prague-West District in the Central Bohemian Region of the Czech Republic. It has about 5,600 inhabitants, making it the most populous Czech municipality without the town status.

== Geography ==
Horoměřice is situated northwest of Prague, in its immediate vicinity. It lies in an agricultural landscape in the Prague Plateau.

== History ==
The first written mention of Horoměřice is from 1273. Back then it was owned by the Strahov Monastery. The monastery lost the village during the Hussite Wars in 1421, but after changing hands several times, the monastery owned it continuously from 1598 until establishment of the municipality.

== Demographics ==
Historical population

Year	Pop.	±%
1869	871	—
1880	957	+9.9%
1890	1,221	+27.6%
1900	1,270	+4.0%
1910	1,268	−0.2%

Year	Pop.	±%
1921	1,269	+0.1%
1930	1,649	+29.9%
1950	1,530	−7.2%
1961	1,616	+5.6%
1970	1,614	−0.1%

Year	Pop.	±%
1980	1,698	+5.2%
1991	1,645	−3.1%
2001	2,042	+24.1%
2011	3,860	+89.0%
2021	5,151	+33.4%

Source: Censuses

== Transport ==
There are no railways or major roads passing through the municipality.

== Sights ==
In the municipality is a simple castle from the 18th century, which belonged to the Strahov Monastery until 1945. Today it is owned by the municipality, which intends to reconstruct and use it for social and cultural purposes.

== Notable people ==
- Benedikt Roezl (1824–1885), traveller, gardener and botanist
