= Lucie Bílá =

Czech singer and actress (born 1966)

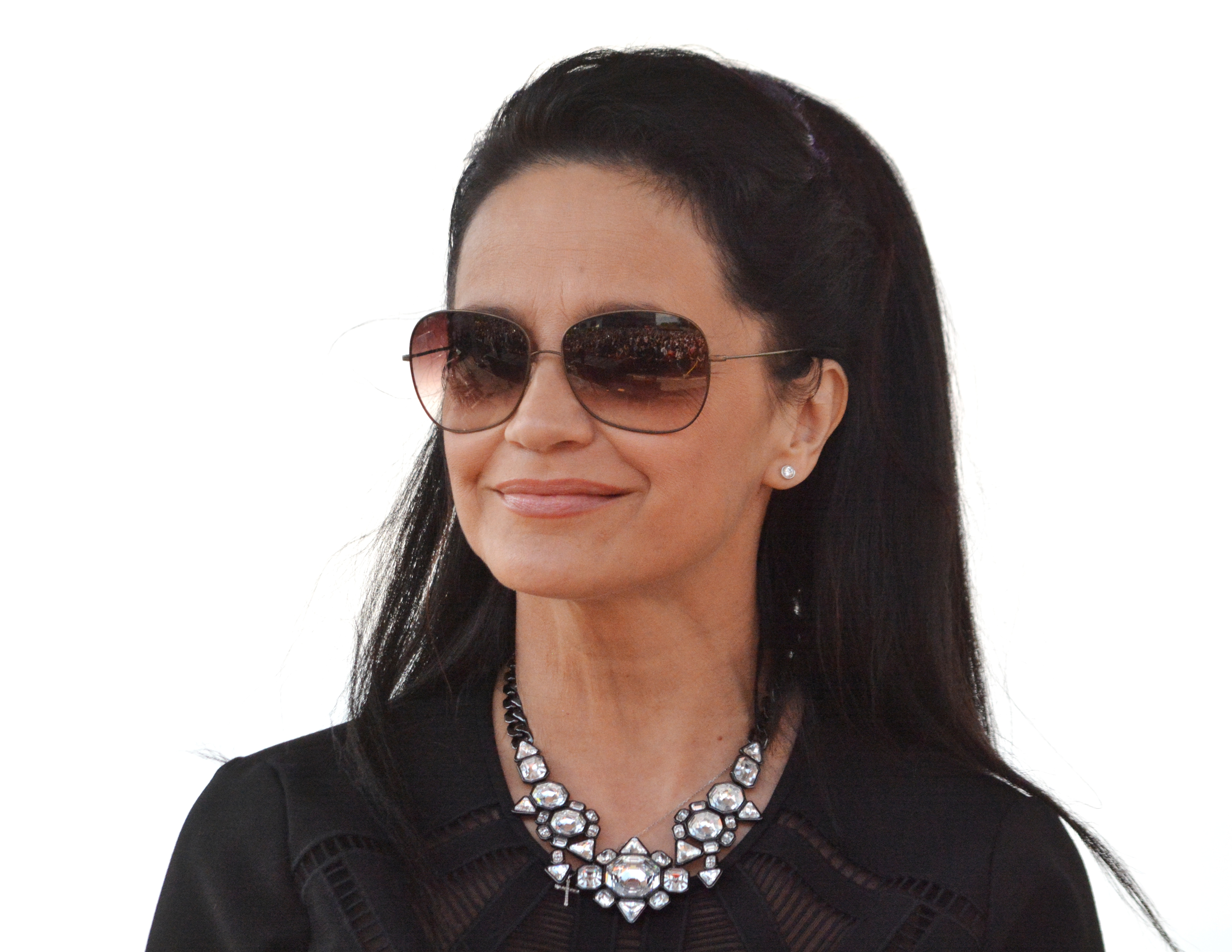
- Bílá in 2017

Background information
- Also known as: Hana Filipi (legal name)
- Born: Hana Zaňáková; 7 April 1966 (age 60); Otvovice, Czechoslovakia
- Genres: Pop rock; dance; soul
- Occupations: Singer, actress
- Instrument: Vocals
- Years active: 1985–present
- Labels: EMI, Supraphon
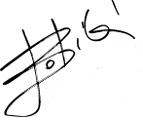
- Website: luciebila.com Lucie Bílá's signature

Lucie Bílá, by her legal name Hana Filipi, (born Hana Zaňáková on 7 April 1966) is a Czech pop singer. According to her label, EMI Czech Republic, the singer has sold over one million albums. She won the Czech musical award, Český slavík, 13 times, more than any other artist.

== Biography ==
Lucie Bílá (born Hana Zaňáková) was born in the village of Otvovice in Czechoslovakia to Czech mother and Slovak father, where she was raised and where she attended a secondary school. Before she became involved in the field of music, she trained to be a seamstress.

Bílá's first experiences with show business were as a member of the rock bands Rock-Automat and Arakain. In 1980, she was noticed by Czech music producer Petr Hannig, who created her stage name Lucie Bílá (literally, Lucy White) and penned her first recorded songs. Her name change was originally due to confusion with another famous Czech singer, Hana Zagorová. For over three decades, Bílá has had tremendous professional success among Czechs in a broad range of endeavors, starring in the best-known stage musicals in the country, releasing several popular solo albums, and starring in several films and television specials. For several years in a row in the 2000s, she topped the list of the most popular Czech singers in the coveted Český slavík awards.

Her personal relationships have been rocky and are perennial tabloid fodder. She and her boyfriend Petr Kratochvíl had a son, Filip, born in 1995. Not long after, he left her for beauty queen finalist Pavlína Babůrková. In 2002, she was married briefly to musician Stanislav Penk, and in 2006 she married another musician, Václav "Noid" Bárta. The pair divorced in 2008. On 10 March 2026, Bílá married her longtime partner Radek Filipi.

== Discography ==
Studio albums

- 1986: Lucie Bílá (I)
- 1992: Missariel
- 1994: Lucie Bílá (II)
- 1997: Duety (with Karel Gott)
- 1998: Hvězdy jako hvězdy
- 1999: Úplně nahá
- 2003: Jampadampa
- 2007: Woman
- 2009: Bang! Bang!
- 2010: Bíle Vánoce
- 2012: Modi
- 2014: Recitál
- 2014: Diamond Collection
- 2016: HANA
- 2017: Bílé Vánoce Lucie Bílé II.
- 2018: Duety (with Karel Gott)
- 2019: Ta o mně

== Musicals ==
- 1992: Bídníci
- 1993: Zahrada rajských potěšení
- 1995: Dracula (225,000 units sold)
- 1996: Krysař
- 2000: Johanka z Arku
- 2003: Romeo a Julie
- 2003: Excalibur
- 2005: Elixír života
- 2005: Láska je láska
- 2008: Němcová!
- 2008: Carmen
- 2012: Aida
- 2014: The Addams Family

== Awards ==
=== Major awards ===
Year	Nominated work	Award	Category	Result	Ref
Music awards
1992	"Láska je láska"	Gramy (aka České Gramy)	Song of the Year	Won^{[A]}	
1992	Missariel	Gramy (aka České Gramy)	Album of the Year	Won	
1992	Herself	Gramy (aka České Gramy)	Best Female Vocal Performance	Won	
1993	Herself	Gramy (aka České Gramy)	Best Female Vocal Performance	Won	
1994	Herself	Gramy (aka České Gramy)	Best Female Vocal Performance	Won^{[B]}	
1995	Herself	Gramy (aka České Gramy)	Best Female Vocal Performance	Won	
1996	"Jsi můj pán"	Gramy (aka České Gramy)	Song of the Year	Won^{[C]}	
1997	"Dívám se, dívám" with Petr Hapka	Ceny Hudební akademie (aka Ceny Akademie populární hudby)	Song of the Year	Won	
1997	Duety with Karel Gott	Ceny Hudební akademie (aka Ceny Akademie populární hudby)	Album of the Year	Nominated	
1997	Herself	Ceny Hudební akademie (aka Ceny Akademie populární hudby)	Best Female Vocal Performance	Won	
1998	Herself	Ceny Hudební akademie (aka Ceny Akademie populární hudby)	Best Female Vocal Performance	Won	
1999	Herself	Ceny Hudební akademie (aka Ceny Akademie populární hudby)	Best Female Vocal Performance	Nominated	
2000	Herself	Ceny Hudební akademie (aka Ceny Akademie populární hudby)	Best Female Vocal Performance	Nominated^{[D]}	
2000	"Most přes minulost"	Ceny Hudební akademie (aka Ceny Akademie populární hudby)	Song of the Year	Nominated	
2003	Jampadampa	Výroční ceny Akademie populární hudby Anděl (aka Anděl Allianz aka Ceny Anděl)	Best-selling album – Female	Won	
2003	Jampadampa	Výroční ceny Akademie populární hudby Anděl (aka Anděl Allianz aka Ceny Anděl)	Album of the Year – Pop	Nominated	
2003	Herself	Výroční ceny Akademie populární hudby Anděl (aka Anděl Allianz aka Ceny Anděl)	Best Female Vocal Performance	Nominated	
2004	Herself	Výroční ceny Akademie populární hudby Anděl (aka Anděl Allianz aka Ceny Anděl)	Best Female Vocal Performance	Nominated	
2006	www.luciebila.com	Výroční ceny Akademie populární hudby Anděl (aka Anděl Allianz aka Ceny Anděl)	Website of the Year	Nominated	
2007	Woman	Výroční ceny Akademie populární hudby Anděl (aka Anděl Allianz aka Ceny Anděl)	Album of the Year – Pop	Nominated	
2007	Herself	Výroční ceny Akademie populární hudby Anděl (aka Anděl Allianz aka Ceny Anděl)	Best Female Vocal Performance	Nominated	
2009	Herself	Výroční ceny Akademie populární hudby Anděl (aka Anděl Allianz aka Ceny Anděl)	Best Female Vocal Performance	No^{[E]}	
2010	Herself	Výroční ceny Akademie populární hudby Anděl (aka Anděl Allianz aka Ceny Anděl)	Best Female Vocal Performance	Won	
2010	Herself	Výroční ceny Akademie populární hudby Anděl (aka Anděl Allianz aka Ceny Anděl)	Best Female Singer – Two Decades	Won	
Theatre awards
2000	Joan of Arc	Ceny Thálie	Best Female Performance – Operetta/Musical	Won	
2008	Carmen	Ceny Thálie	Best Female Performance – Operetta/Musical	Nominated	

Notes

- A Director Filip Renč won "Best Video" for "Láska je láska".
- B Director Filip Renč won "Best Video" for "Zahrada rajských potěšení".
- C Director František Antonín Brabec won Best Video for Bílá's "Ave Maria".
- D According to results published by Mladá fronta DNES, Bílá finished third with 16% of the votes in 2000, behind winner Lenka Dusilová with 51% and Helena Vondráčková with 33%.
- E Although the initially-published list featured five nominees (including Bílá), the Akademie populární hudby (Academy of Popular Music) announced a final list two days later which was limited to three artists per category and did not include Bílá.

=== Polls ===
Zlatý slavík by Mladý svět weekly

Year	Nomination	Category	Result	Ref
1985	Herself	People's Choice: Female Singer	#21	
1986	Herself	People's Choice: Female Singer	#10	
1987	Herself	People's Choice: Female Singer	#9	
1988	Herself	People's Choice: Female Singer	#6	
1989	Herself	People's Choice: Female Singer	#10	
1990	Herself	People's Choice: Female Singer	#10	
1991	Herself	People's Choice: Female Singer	#11	

Český slavík

Year	Nomination	Category	Result	Ref
1996	Herself	People's Choice: Female Singer	Won	
1997	Herself	People's Choice: Female Singer	Won	
1998	Herself	People's Choice: Female Singer	Won	
1999	Herself	People's Choice: Female Singer	Won	
2000	Herself	People's Choice: Female Singer	Won	
2001	Herself	People's Choice: Female Singer	Won	
2002	Herself	People's Choice: Female Singer	Won	
2003	Herself	People's Choice: Female Singer	Won	
2004	Herself	People's Choice: Female Singer	Won	
2005	Herself	People's Choice: Female Singer	#2^{[F]}	
2006	Herself	People's Choice: Female Singer	#2^{[F]}	
2007	Herself	People's Choice: Female Singer	Won	
2008	Herself	People's Choice: Female Singer	Won	
2009	Herself	People's Choice: Female Singer	Won	
2010	Herself	People's Choice: Female Singer	Won	
2011	Herself	People's Choice: Female Singer	Won	
2012	Herself	People's Choice: Female Singer	Won	
2013	Herself	People's Choice: Female Singer	Won	
2014	Herself	People's Choice: Female Singer	Won	
2015	Herself	People's Choice: Female Singer	Won	
2016	Herself	People's Choice: Female Singer	Won	
2017	Herself	People's Choice: Female Singer	Won	
2021	Herself	People's Choice: Female Singer	#2^{[J]}	

TýTý by Televize weekly

Year	Nomination	Category	Result	Ref
1992	Herself	People's Choice: Female Singer	#3	
1993	Herself	People's Choice: Female Singer	#2	
1994	Herself	People's Choice: Female Singer	Won	
1995	Herself	People's Choice: Female Singer	Won	
1996	Herself	People's Choice: Female Singer	Won^{[G]}	
1997	Herself	People's Choice: Female Singer	Won^{[H]}	
1998	Herself	People's Choice: Female Singer	Won^{[H]}	
1999	Herself	People's Choice: Female Singer	Won^{[G]}	
2000	Herself	People's Choice: Female Singer	Won^{[I]}	
2001	Herself	People's Choice: Female Singer	Won^{[G]}	
2002	Herself	People's Choice: Female Singer	Won	
2003	Herself	People's Choice: Female Singer	Won	
2004	Herself	People's Choice: Female Singer	#2	
2005	Herself	People's Choice: Female Singer	#2	
2006	Herself	People's Choice: Female Singer	Won	
2007	Herself	People's Choice: Female Singer	Won	
2008	Herself	People's Choice: Female Singer	#3	
2009	Herself	People's Choice: Female Singer	?	
2010	Herself	People's Choice: Female Singer	#2	
2011	Herself	People's Choice: Female Singer	Won	
2012	Herself	People's Choice: Female Singer	#2	
2013	Herself	People's Choice: Female Singer	#2	
2014	Herself	People's Choice: Female Singer	#2	

Žebřík by Report monthly

Year	Nomination	Category	Result	Ref
1992	Missariel	Best Album	#28	
1992	Herself	Best Act	#10	
1992	Herself	Worst Act	#7	
1992	Herself	Best Female Singer	Won	
1992	"Láska je láska"	Best Song	#25	
1992	"Láska je láska"	Best Video	Won	
1993	"Láska je láska"	Best Video	#9	
1993	Herself	Best Female Singer	Won	
1994	Herself	Best Female Singer	#2	
1994	Lucie Bílá	Best Album	#15	
1994	"Jinak to nebude"	Best Song	#14	
1994	"Zahrada rajských potěšení"	Best Video	#4	
1995	"Zahrada rajských potěšení"	Best Video	#7	
1995	"Dalekohled"	Best Video	#19	
1995	Herself	Best Singer	#4	
1995	Herself	Best Personality	#8	
1996	Herself	Best Personality	#6	
1996	"Ave Maria"	Best Song	#11	
1996	"Ave Maria"	Best Video	#7	
1996	"Jsi můj pán"	Best Video	#20	
1996	"Jsi můj pán"	Best Song	#26	
1996	Herself and BSP	Best Live Act	#17	
1996	Herself	Best Female Singer	Won	
1997	Herself	Best Female Singer	Won	
1997	Herself	Best Personality	#6	
1997	Herself	Worst Act	#15	
1997	Herself and Gott	Best Live Act	#23	
1997	"Dívám se, dívám" with Hapka	Best Song	#18	
1997	"Trouba"	Best Song	#27	
1998	"Trouba"	Best Video	#29	
1998	Herself	Worst Act	#10	
1998	Herself	Best Personality	#15	
1998	Herself	Best Female Singer	#2	
1999	Herself	Best Female Singer	#4	
1999	Herself	Best Personality	#10	
1999	"Čas dluhů"	Best Video"	#21	
2000	Herself	Best Female Singer	#5	
2001	Herself	Best Female Singer	#6	
2002	Herself	Best Female Singer	#8	
2003	Herself	Best Female Singer	#4	
2003	Herself	Best Personality	#18	
2003	Herself	Worst Act	#20	
2003	Jampadampa	Best Album	#10	
2003	"Esemes"	Best Video	#9	
2003	"Esemes"	Best Song	#18	
2004	Herself	Best Female Singer	#5	
2005	Herself	Best Female Singer	#7	
2008	Herself	Best Female Singer	#4–5	

Notes

- F ^{1} ^{2} Both editions, in 2005 and 2006 won Aneta Langerová.
- G ^{1} ^{2} ^{3} In 1996, 1999 and 2001 Bílá was also classified as the second winner of the poll overall.
- H ^{1} ^{2} As the absolute winner Bílá would be ranked in the 97' edition and in 1998.
- I In 2000, Bílá finished as the third winner of the poll total.
- J In 2021, won Ewa Farná.

== See also ==
- The 100 Greatest Slovak Albums of All Time
