= Benedikt Roezl =

Czech botanist, gardener and explorer

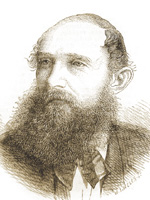

Benedikt Roezl (13 August 1824, Horoměřice – 14 October 1885, Prague) was a traveller, gardener and botanist (sometimes Benedict or Benito Roezl as called by indigenous American people). Probably the most famous collector of orchids of his time.

Despite the loss of a hand (in an accident in Cuba), Roezl travelled the world and discovered more than 800 species of orchid, with more than forty named in his honour.

Roezl was also the founder of the Czech botanical magazine, Flora, in 1880. There is a statue (depicting him holding an orchid with a Native American kneeling beside him) of Roezl in Prague, located on the southern end of Charles Square.

== Some of the Roezl's Travels ==
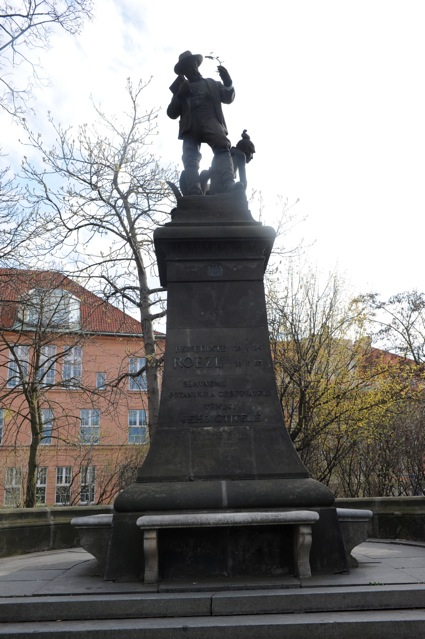
Benedikt Roezl Statue in Prague

3 August 1872: New York Benedikt Roezl travelled with his nephew and collector František Klaboch to New York. Klaboch later died of yellow fever. Through St. Louis they left to Denver.

6 September 1872: Denver Roezl collected Yucca angustifolia (6 boxes) and Calochortus (1000). He was robbed here and left to New Mexico. Left again to California.

31 October 1872: San Francisco From San Francisco he left to Acapulco and to the surrounding Sierra Madre where he collected over 2000 orchids. When looking for the Oncidium tigrinum orchid, he climbed to 3000 metres above sea level. From Mexico he left for Caracas.

10 February 1873: Caracas, Venezuela Roezl was looking for an unknown orchid called "flor de mayo". Collected 8 boxes and left for Mexico via Havana.

March 1873: Sontecomapan, Mexico Stopped by to pick up his nephew Eduard Klaboch. Then left for Havana and to New York again. From New York travelled to Peru.

August 1873: Peru He climbed the 5000-metre-high mountains to bring back more than 10.000 orchids to Lima. Roezl then travelled to southern Peru.

Bolivia, Ecuador He visited lake Titicaca, La Paz and through the Illimani mountain walked the Yungas territory, bringing back many orchids. Once again climbed the Andes, visited Ecuador, Chimborazo mountain and at the 6000 metres above sea level he discovered the new Pescatorea roezlii orchid.

April 1874: London

1875: Prague

== Plants named in Roezl's Honour ==
Among the orchids named in his honour are:

- Miltoniopsis roezlii
- Pescatorea roezlii
- Selenipedium roezlii
- Sobralia roezlii
- genus Roezliella

Other plants named in his honour:

- Zamia roezlii - a cycad of the family Zamiaceae
- Ribes roezlii - Sierra gooseberry

List of plants described by Roezl can be found here.

== Literature ==
- Benedikt Roezl: Catalogue des graines de conifères mexicains. 1857.
- Benedikt Roezl: My last trip to the western coast of Mexico, 188? translated into Czech, magazine Flora as "Poslední má cesta na západní pobřeží mexické"
- Benedikt Roezl: Plants I have discovered in North and South America, 188? translated into Czech, magazine Flora as "Rostliny mnou v severní a jižní Americe objevené"

== Books and external links ==
- Benedikt Roezl on Orchids.co.in
- Benedikt Roezl on Czech radio in Spanish
- Roezl on PACSOA Palm and Cycad Societies of Australia
- Information from the home region of Roezl in Czech
- Lev V.: Benedikt Roezl, Orbis, Praha, 1949 - the main biography on Roezl in Czech
- The Garden Journal of the Royal Horticultural Society, Vol. 122, Feb. 1997
- Healey B.J.: The Plant Hunters, Charles Scribner's Sons, 1975
- Lemmon K.: The Golden Age of Plant Hunters, Phoenix House,1968
- Coats A. M.:The Plant Hunters, McGraw-Hill, 1970
- Toufar P.: Tajemnou českou krajinou, Regia, Praha, 2001
- Garden, The . 1885. Obituary .Vo. 28, no. 727.
- Gardeners' Chronicle. 1885. Benedict Roezl. Vol. 24. no. 617.
- Gardeners' Chronicle . 1892. Benedict Roezl.Vol. 11, no. 263.
- Gardening World, The. 1885. October 24.
- Kline, Mary C. 1963. Benedict Roezl- Famous orchid collectors .Amer.Orch. Soc. Bull. 32, no. 8.
- Sander, F. 1952. Benedict Roezl and Cattleya aurea . The Orch.Rev. 60, no. 710.
- Luigi Berliocchi, Mark Griffiths: The Orchid in Lore and Legend - available on Google Books
