= Hämatom =

German metal band

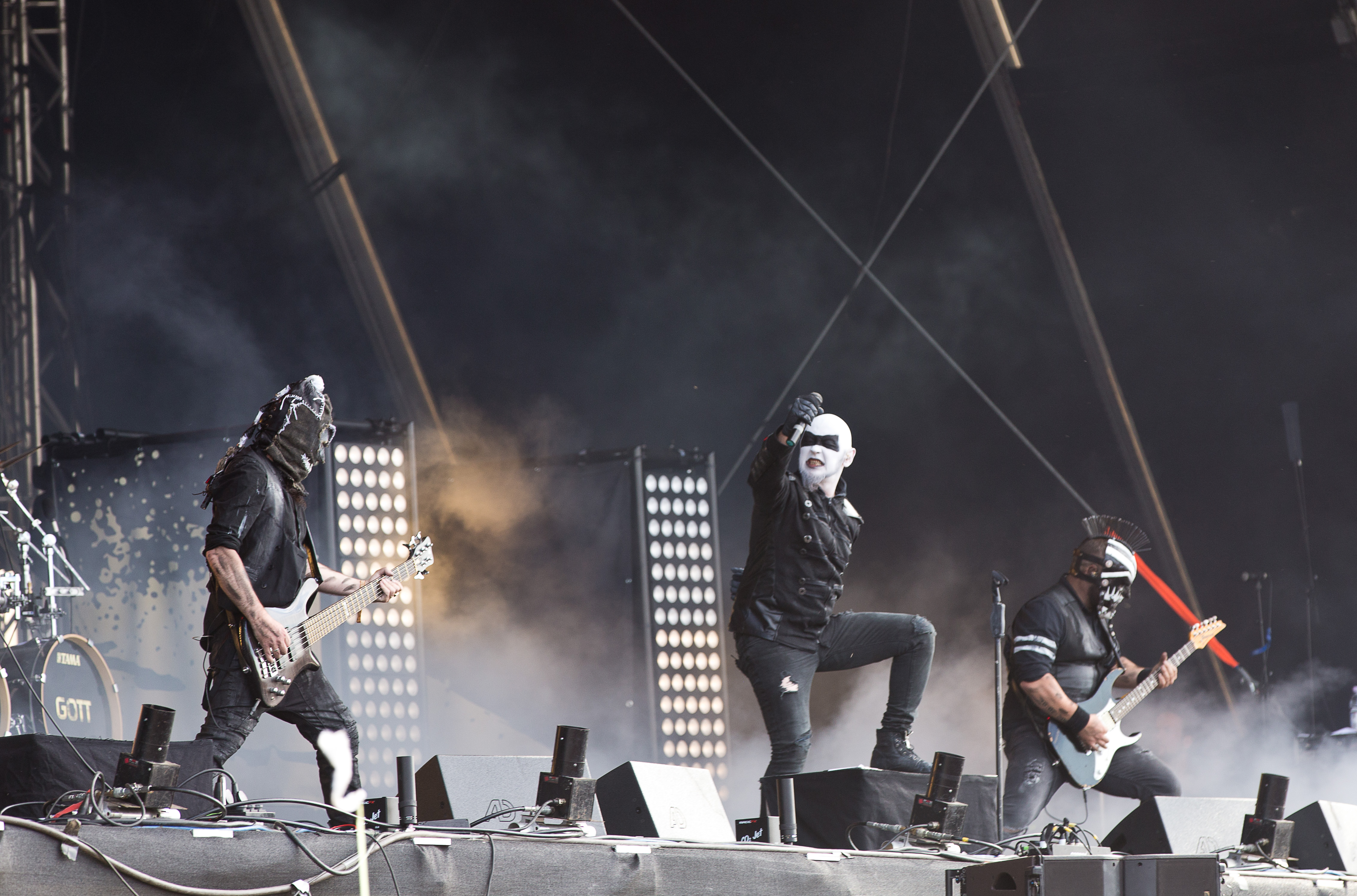
- Hämatom performing at Rockharz Open Air 2016 in Germany

Background information
- Origin: Speichersdorf, Germany
- Genres: Groove metal, thrash metal, Neue Deutsche Härte
- Years active: 2004–present
- Members: "Nord" (Torsten Scharf); "Ost" (Jacek Zyla); "Süd" (Frank Jooss); "Rose" (Annika Jaschke)
- Past members: "West" (Peter Haag)
- Website: haematom.de

Hämatom (German for "Hematoma") is a German metal band that formed in 2004 in Speichersdorf, Franconia.

The band concept is based on unifying musical and visual elements, leading to naming the band members after the four cardinal directions and wearing masks. Early on, European fables influenced their German lyrics. In time, the band transitioned to societal, religious and socio-critical themes.

The band has released eleven studio albums since 2004, and is increasingly charting higher. The album Wir sind Gott entered the charts at No. 5. The band's focal points are performing live and organising the festivals 'Dämonentanz' and 'Das laute Abendmahl' with other bands.

== History ==
After forming in 2004, Hämatom played their first shows in the Franconia vicinity. In April 2005, the band toured with J.B.O., selling their self-produced single "Butzemann". The following single, "Häschen", teased the upcoming, self-distributed EP Nein, released in September 2005. Some of its nine tracks were inspired by European fables and nursery rhymes. In 2005, the band supported Knorkator in Nuremberg, and played Earthshaker-Fest with bands such as Nightwish and Manowar, and the Burning Fall Festival with Six Feet Under, amongst others.

In February 2006, the band headlined a tour through 10 German cities. On this tour, the band offered a special tour single featuring the songs "Leck mich!", "Schmerz" and "Mit dem Kopf durch die Wand", which were released on the following album, Wut. In autumn 2006, the band supported Die Apokalyptischen Reiter through 14 cities of the Republic.

The year 2007 began with J.B.O.'s Rock-Muzik-Tour through Germany, Austria and Switzerland, in which they accompanied Hämatom on their first trip abroad. In April, the band signed with Megapress to distribute the album Wut via Soulfood. The album was released on 25 January 2008. The song "Leck mich!" from this album became a fan favorite.

On 15 January 2010, the band released their second album, Stay Kränk. In 2011, the band played Wacken Open Air and the Walpurgis-Schlacht at the Hexentanz Festival. On 30 September 2011, the third album, Wenn man vom Teufel spricht, was released. Hämatom performed at on3-südwild. The album entered at No. 60 on the chart. The 200th show in March 2012 was captured for a live DVD and CD released in September, titled Schutt und Asche and which entered the chart at No. 8.

In July 2013, the band played the Sofia-Rocks-Festival in Bulgaria to support Rammstein. On 22 September 2013, the fourth album, Keinzeitmensch, was released. The single "Alte Liebe rostet nicht" was published as a pre-release title. From October onwards, the band toured through Germany, Austria and Switzerland.

In mid-2014, they worked with producer Kristian Kohlmannslehner in his Kohlekeller Studios on their album X. It was released on 31 October 2014, on the band's 10-year anniversary, and entered the chart at No. 16. The double-album included cover songs from Marteria, Deichkind, Jan Delay and others, as well as two previously unreleased songs, and eight re-recorded classics. The sold-out 10th anniversary show was held at the Musikcenter in Trockau on 26 December 2014. Hämatom played alongside Knorkator and Stepfather Fred. This winter festival Dämonentanz has been held ever since. The festival season of 2015 led the band to perform at Summer Breeze Open Air followed by the Heidenfest-Tour with Die Apokalyptischen Reiter and Korpiklaani through Germany, Austria and Switzerland.

In January 2016, Hämatom released the first single, "Fick das System", from the 25 March release Wir sind Gott, which entered the chart at No. 5 and stayed within the top 100 for several weeks. They also charted in Austria (No. 24) and Switzerland (No. 69). The sold-out release show at Aladin in Bremen on Good Friday was repeated in 2017, and has become a regular event. On 17 June, they played in Romania, at Rock la Mureș Festival, in Timiș County.

On 16 August 2023, the band stated that "West" had died from an unknown chronic illness, and that the planned show at Rock at the Lakes was cancelled.

On 23 May 2024, Hämatom announced that Annika Jaschke had joined the band under the pseudonym "Rose". According to the announcement, the position of "West" will not be filled again, and West will continue to be listed as a member of the band.

== Band members ==
Hämatom live at Rockharz 2026

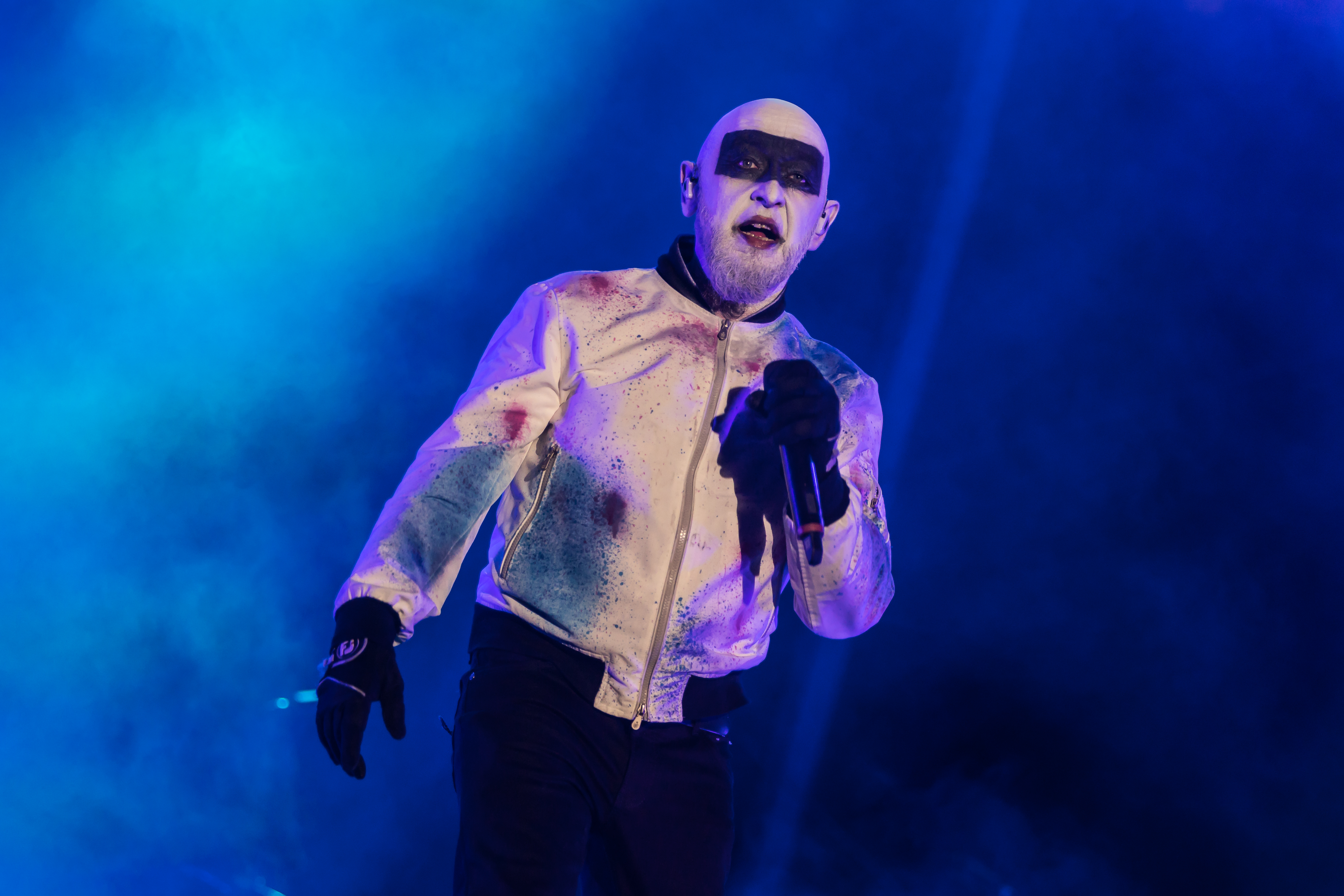
Thorsten „Nord“ Scharf, vocals

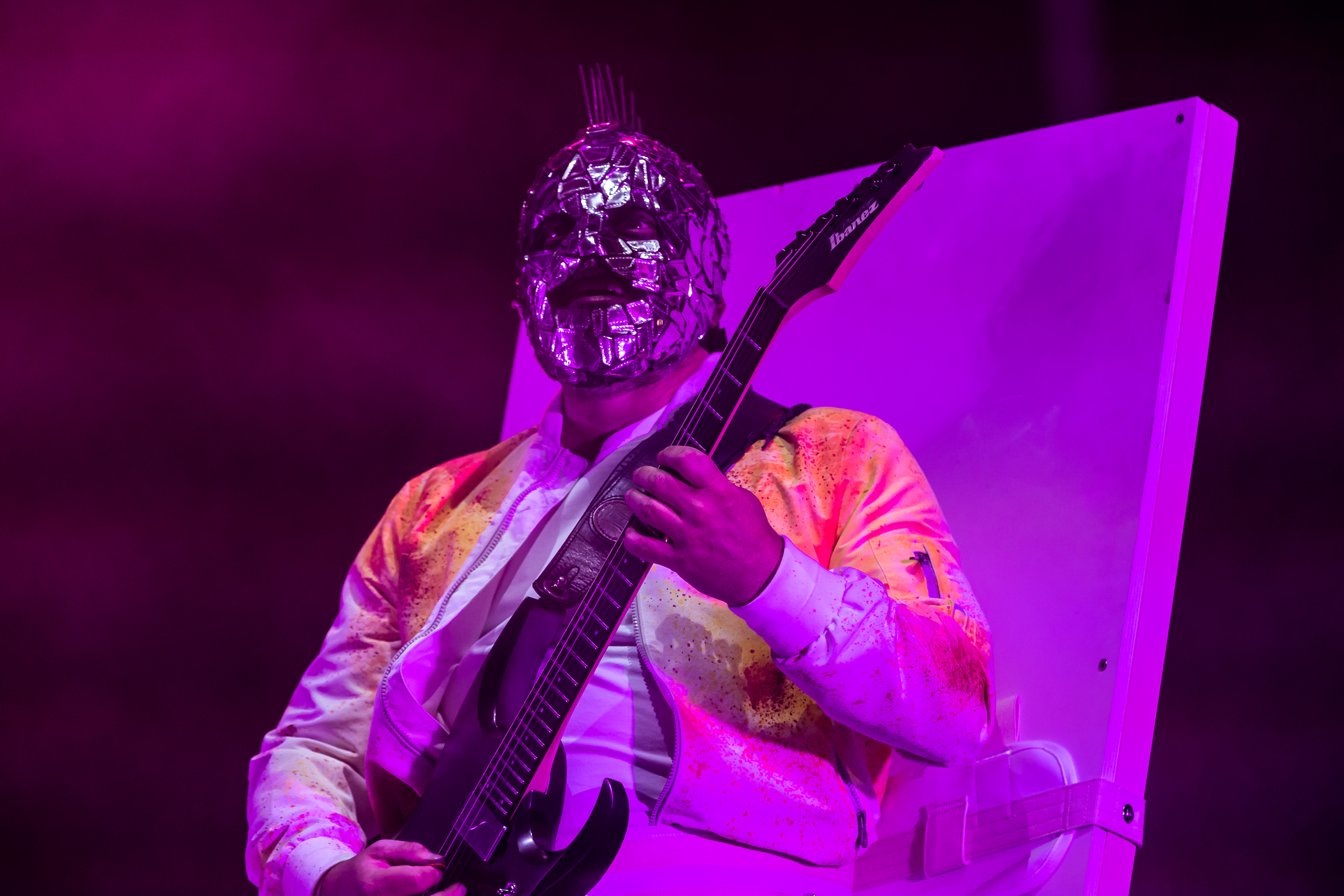
Jacek „Ost“ Zyla, guitars

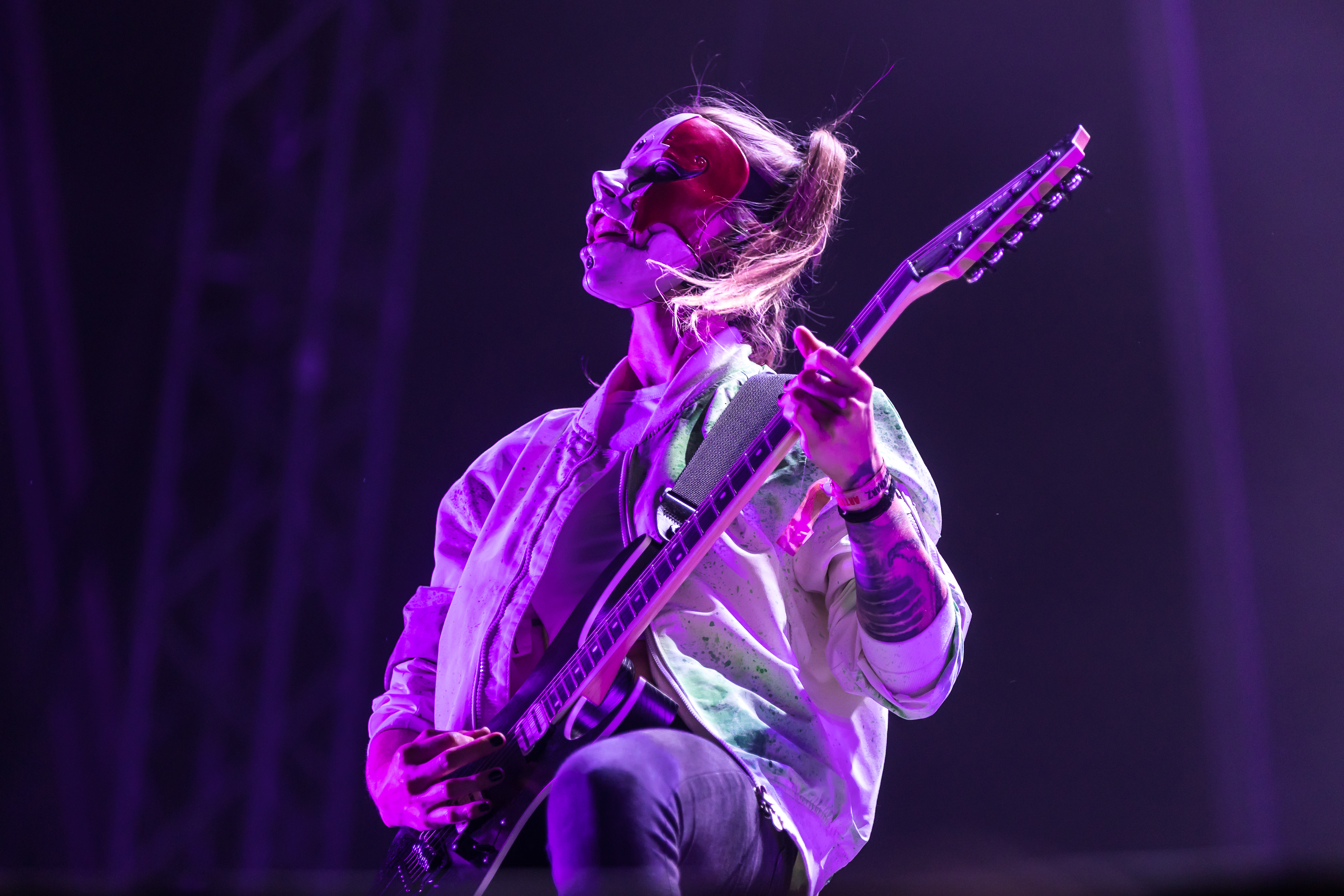
Annika „Rose“ Jaschke, guitars

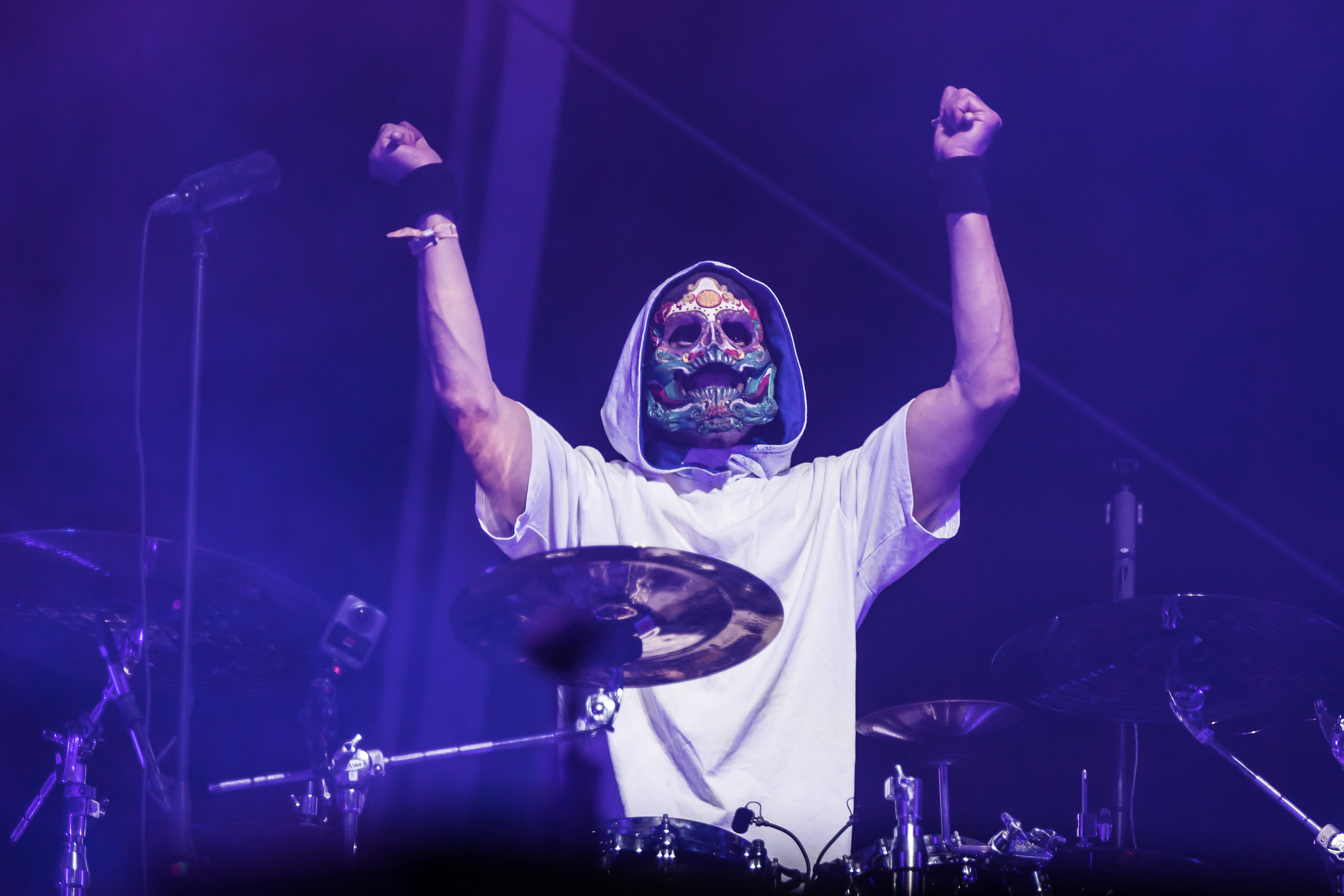
Frank „Süd“ Jooss, drums

=== Current ===
- Torsten "Nord" Scharf – vocals
- Jacek "Ost" Zyla – guitar
- Frank "Süd" Jooss – drums
- Annika "Rose" Jaschke – guitar (from 2024)

=== Former ===
- Peter "West" Haag – bass (died 2023)

== Discography ==
=== Studio albums ===
- Wut (2008)
- Stay Kränk (2010)
- Wenn man vom Teufel spricht (2011)
- Keinzeitmensch (2013)
- X (2014)
- Wir sind Gott (2016)
- Bestie der Freiheit (2018)
- Maskenball (2019)
- Berlin (Ein akustischer Tanz auf dem Vulkan) (2021)
- Die Liebe ist tot (2021)
- Lang lebe der Hass (2022)
- Für dich (2025)

=== EPs ===
- Nein (2005)
- Alte Liebe Rostet nicht (2013)
- Fick das System! (2016)
- #FCKCRN (2020)
- Zwischen Gangstern und Ganoven (2021)
- It’s raining beer (2022)
- Gagamania Mixtape (2026)

=== Live DVDs ===
- Schutt und Asche (2012)

=== Live Albums ===
- Schutt und Asche (2012)
- Wir Sind Gott (Live beim Teufel) (2016)
- Maskenball-Live (2020)

=== Singles ===
- "Häschen" (2005)
- "Butzemann" (2005)
- "Alte Liebe rostet nicht" (2013)
- "Fick das System" (2016)
- "Made in USA" (2017)
- "Zeit für neue Hymnen" (2017)
- "Mörder" (2017)
- "Lange nicht perfekt" (2018)
- "Warum kann ich nicht glücklich sein?" (2018)
- "Lichterloh" (2018)
- "Behind the Mask" (2018)
- "I Want It All" (feat. Hansi Kürsch) (2019)
- "Wir sind keine Band" (2019)
- "Alte Liebe rostet nicht" (feat. Micha Rhein) (acoustic version) (2019)
- "Da da da ich lieb dich nicht du liebst mich nicht aha aha aha" (feat. Alex Wesselsky) (2019)
- "Anti Alles" (2019)
- "Bleib in der Schule" (2019)
- "#FCKCRN" (2020)
- "Zombieland" (2020)
- "Tanz auf dem Vulkan" (2021)
- "Au revoir" (2021)
- "Zwischen Gangstern und Ganoven" (2021)
- "Ihr wisst gar nichts über mich" (2021)
- "So wie wir" (2021)
- "Dagegen" (2021)
- "Ficken unsren Kopf" (2021)
- "Liebe auf den ersten Fick" (2021)
- "Legenden" (2022)
- "Ein Freund" (2022)
- "SOS" (2022)
- "Es regnet Bier" (2022)
- "It's Raining Beer" (2022)
- "Gaga" (2022)
- "Strassenbande 666" (2022)
- "Víc Než Bůh" (2023)
- "Gott muss ein Arschloch sein" (2023)
- "Ein' auf den Tod - Zwei auf das Leben" (2024)
- "Diego Maradona" (2024)
- "Scheiße kommt - Scheiße geht" (2024)
- "Arschlochkind" (2024)
- "Pogo-girl" (2024)
- "Schmutzig Liebe machen" (2024)
- "Für dich" (2024)
- "Alles wegen Bier" (2025)
- "Erzähl es meinem Mittelfinger" (2025)
- "Spielmannsschwur (united)" (2025)
- "Bleibst du heute mit mir wach?" (2025)
- "Bleibst du heute mit mir wach? (Anstandslos & Durchgeknallt Remix)" (2025)
- "Lauter Lügen" (2025)
- "Children of the Sun" (feat. The Hardkiss, 2025)
- "We Wish You a Metal Christmas" (feat. Dominum, 2025)
- "Ü30 (feat. The Butcher Sisters)" (2026)
- "Wir Sind Gott II" (2026)
- "STAMPF" (2026)
- "Wir haben Dorf (feat. Troglauer)" (2026)
- "BDU (feat. Trailerpark)" (2026)
- "Out Of Order" (2026)
- "BDU - Armageddon Remix (feat. Trailerpark, The Boy The G)" (2026)
- "Weil Ich rauchen einfach mag" (2026)
- "Faules pack" (2026)
- "Ich liebs mit dir (feat.Vivi Minu)" (2026)
