= Česko Slovenská SuperStar season 7 =

Season of television series

Česko Slovenská SuperStar
- Season 7
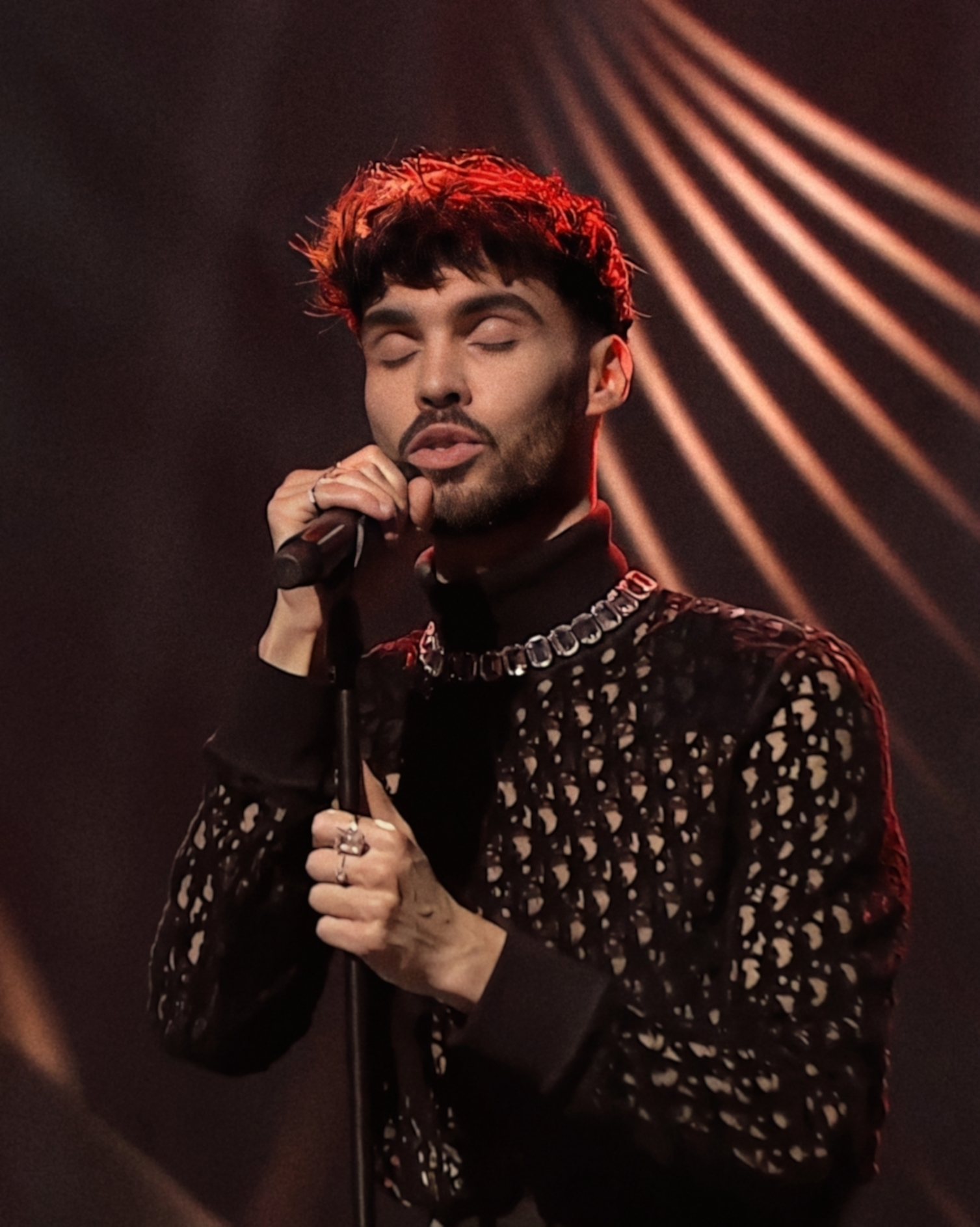
- Hosted by: Ewa Farná
- Judges: Leoš Mareš; Patricie Pagáčová; Marián Čekovský; Monika Bagárová; Pavol Habera
- Winner: Adam Pavlovčin
- Runner-up: Elizabeth Kopecká
- Finals venue: Studio Jinonice, Prague

Release
- Original network: Nova; Markíza
- Original release: 3 September 2021

Season chronology
- ← Previous; Season 6

Česko Slovenská SuperStar (English: Czech&Slovak SuperStar), shortened to SuperStar in the seventh season, is the joint Czech-Slovak version of Idol series' Pop Idol merged from Česko hledá SuperStar and Slovensko hľadá SuperStar which previous to that had three individual seasons each. The seventh season aired in autumn 2021 with castings held in Prague and Bratislava. It is broadcast on two channels: TV Nova (Czech Republic) and Markíza (Slovakia) which have also been the broadcast stations for the individual seasons.

== Regional auditions ==
Auditions were held from 21 September 2020. Due to the COVID-19 pandemic all auditions before final jury audition were held online.

== Grand selection – TOP 82 ==
All 82 contestants that made it through auditions were allocated to Lake Mácha in Doksy, Czech Republic. They performed in three groups. The first group were group performances of three or four singers, whilst the second group were contestants with the same song and the third group were contestants who sang solo. 50 contestants progressed through to the next round.

== Duets – TOP 50 ==
50 contestants that made it through competed in duets. Every duo performed a song they were given. The superselection took place in an old sewage treatment plant in Prague, Czech Republic.

Contestant	Song	Artist	Result	Contestant	Song	Artist	Result
Monika Žilková	"Runaway Baby"	Bruno Mars	Advanced	Valerie Kaňová	"Tell Him"	Barbra Streisand & Celine Dion	Advanced
Miriam Jarošová	"Runaway Baby"	Bruno Mars	Eliminated	Katarína Pustaiová	"Tell Him"	Barbra Streisand & Celine Dion	Advanced
Nikola Votrubová	"Moves Like Jagger"	Maroon 5 & Christina Aguilera	Eliminated	Kristína Oríšková	"Apologize"	OneRepublic	Eliminated
David Šamko	"Moves Like Jagger"	Maroon 5 & Christina Aguilera	Eliminated	Filip Svoboda	"Apologize"	OneRepublic	Advanced
Dominique Alagia	"Photograph"	Ed Sheeran	Eliminated	Štěpán Růžička	"Just Give Me a Reason"	Pink & Nate Ruess	Eliminated
Martin Probošt	"Photograph"	Ed Sheeran	Advanced	Sabina Ulmanová	"Just Give Me a Reason"	Pink & Nate Ruess	Eliminated
Natálie Zbuzková	"Say Something"	A Great Big World & Christina Aguilera	Advanced	ngelika Sofia Selepková	"Stronger (What Doesn't Kill You)"	Kelly Clarkson	Eliminated
Michal Nováček	"Say Something"	A Great Big World & Christina Aguilera	Eliminated	Tereza Smetanová	"Stronger (What Doesn't Kill You)"	Kelly Clarkson	Eliminated
Adéla Schlesingerová	"Stay"	Rihanna ft. Mikky Ekko	Eliminated	Petra Zubčáková	"Stay with Me"	Sam Smith	Eliminated
Adam Janota	"Stay"	Rihanna ft. Mikky Ekko	Advanced	Adam Řičica	"Stay with Me"	Sam Smith	Eliminated
Angelika Kollmannová	"I Got You Babe"	Sonny & Cher	Advanced	Barbara Bortolini	"Little Talks"	Of Monsters and Men	Eliminated
Jiří Langr	"I Got You Babe"	Sonny & Cher	Eliminated	Lukáš Holoubek	"Little Talks"	Of Monsters and Men	Eliminated
Marietta Mareková	"Everything Burns"	Ben Moody & Anastacia	Advanced	Michal Pribylinec	"(I've Had) The Time of My Life"	Bill Medley & Jennifer Warnes	Eliminated
Ludvík Hušek	"Everything Burns"	Ben Moody & Anastacia	Eliminated	Felicita Victoria Prokešová	"(I've Had) The Time of My Life"	Bill Medley & Jennifer Warnes	Eliminated
Elizabeth Kopecká	"Hallelujah"	Leonard Cohen	Advanced	Pamela Narimanian	"Uptown Funk"	Bruno Mars	Eliminated
Adam Pavlovčin	"Hallelujah"	Leonard Cohen	Advanced	Dávid Bílek	"Uptown Funk"	Bruno Mars	Advanced
Katarína Stohrová	"Stand by Me"	Ben E. King	Advanced	Kristina Allaniiazová	"Save Your Tears"	The Weeknd	Eliminated
Martin Duffek	"Stand by Me"	Ben E. King	Advanced	Kristián Ilčík	"Save Your Tears"	The Weeknd	Eliminated
Daniela Bakšiová	"Nothing Compares 2 U"	Sinéad O'Connor	Advanced	Carmen Saroyan	"Shallow"	Lady Gaga & Bradley Cooper	Eliminated
Kateřina Chybová	"Nothing Compares 2 U"	Sinéad O'Connor	Advanced	Barbora Štanclová	"Shallow"	Lady Gaga & Bradley Cooper	Eliminated
Erika Reindlová	"I'm Yours"	Jason Mraz	Eliminated	Henrieta Bobuľová	"Falling Slowly"	Glen Hansard & Markéta Irglová	Eliminated
Nikolas Bitkovskij	"I'm Yours"	Jason Mraz	Advanced	Adam Dráb	"Falling Slowly"	Glen Hansard & Markéta Irglová	Eliminated
Nikita Machytková	"Perfect"	Ed Sheeran	Advanced	Nelly Řehořová	"Pumped Up Kicks"	Foster the People	Eliminated
Petr Jiran	"Perfect"	Ed Sheeran	Advanced	Marián Hollý	"Pumped Up Kicks"	Foster the People	Eliminated
Kateřina Krejčíková	"Hello"	Lionel Richie	Eliminated				
Ladislav Hunka	"Hello"	Lionel Richie	Advanced				

== Semifinal ==
20 contestants progressed through to the semifinal. Similar to the previous season, the semifinal did not air live. The final 10 acts that made it through to the live shows were selected by the panel of judges.

=== Top 20 ===
Order	Contestant	Song (original artist)	Result
1	Monika Žilková	"Proud Mary" (Tina Turner)	Eliminated
2	Valerie Kaňová	"Je suis malade" (Lara Fabian)	Eliminated
3	Adam Pavlovčin	"Another Love" (Tom Odell)	Advanced
4	Daniela Bakšiová	"Wish You Were Here" (Pink Floyd)	Eliminated
5	Petr Jiran	"Jealous" (Labrinth)	Advanced
6	Angelika Kollmannová	"IDGAF" (Dua Lipa)	Eliminated
7	Filip Svoboda	"Leave a Light On" (Tom Walker)	Advanced
8	Nikita Machytková	"Love on the Brain" (Rihanna)	Advanced
9	Nikolas Bitkovskij	"Watermelon Sugar" (Harry Styles)	Advanced
10	Katarína Pustaiová	"You Lost Me" (Christina Aguilera)	Eliminated
11	Ladislav Hunka	"Too Close" (Alex Clare)	Advanced
12	Katarína Stohrová	"Love Hurts" (Nazareth)	Advanced
13	Martin Duffek	"Chci zas v tobě spát"(Lucie)	Eliminated
14	Kateřina Chybová	"Snowman" (Sia)	Eliminated
15	Marietta Mareková	"When We Were Young" (Adele)	Advanced
16	Adam Janota	"Next to Me" (Imagine Dragons)	Advanced
17	Martin Probošt	"Your Song" (Elton John)	Eliminated
18	Natálie Zbuzková	"Sober" (Demi Lovato)	Eliminated
19	Dávid Bílek	"Treat You Better" (Shawn Mendes)	Eliminated
20	Elizabeth Kopecká	"Always Remember Us This Way" (Lady Gaga)	Advanced

== Finalists ==
Contestant	Age	Hometown	Place finished
Adam Pavlovčin	26	Prague, Czech Republic	Winner
Elizabeth Kopecká	27	Prague, Czech Republic	Runner-up
Nikolas Bitkovskij	20	Liberec, Czech Republic	3rd
Katarína Stohrová	19	Rožňava, Slovakia	4th
Petr Jiran	23	Prague, Czech Republic	5th
Marietta Mareková	17	Smižany, Slovakia	6th
Adam Janota	27	Prague, Czech Republic	7th
Ladislav Hunka	27	Bánovce nad Bebravou, Slovakia	8th
Filip Svoboda	21	Teplice, Czech Republic	9th
Nikita Machytková	17	Prague, Czech Republic	10th

== Finals ==
Ten contestants made it through to the live finals. There were only four final live show this season. The 10 finalists consisted of 2 Slovak male singers, 4 Czech male singers, 2 Slovak female singers and 2 Czech female singers. The final live shows were themed and aired weekly. Elimination results were decided by the audience vote and announced live right after the live show. Each week, two contestants were eliminated until the remaining four reached the grand final. The winner was chosen by the public. The grand final aired on 19 December 2021.

=== Top 10 ===
Order	Contestant	Song (original artist)	Result
1	Nikita Machytková	"Mercy" (Duffy)	Withdrew (Note: Before her performance Nikita withdrew from competition due to her mother being ill. She performed her song and left the competition.)
2	Nikolas Bitkovskij	"When I Was Your Man" (Bruno Mars)	Safe
3	Filip Svoboda	"Hotel California" (Eagles)	Eliminated
4	Ladislav Hunka	"Sex on Fire" (Kings of Leon)	Safe
5	Marietta Mareková	"Un-Break My Heart" (Toni Braxton)	Safe
6	Adam Janota	"Shut Up and Dance" (Walk the Moon)	Safe
7	Adam Pavlovčin	"Drivers License" (Olivia Rodrigo)	Safe
8	Elizabeth Kopecká	"Try" (Pink)	Safe
9	Katarína Stohrová	"Rebel Yell" (Billy Idol)	Safe
10	Petr Jiran	"When the Party's Over" (Billie Eilish)	Safe

=== Top 8 ===
Order	Contestant	Song (original artist)	Result
1	Marietta Mareková	"Son of a Preacher Man" (Dusty Springfield)	Safe
2	Adam Janota	"Sign of the Times" (Harry Styles)	Eliminated
3	Katarína Stohrová	"Young and Beautiful" (Lana Del Rey)	Safe
4	Nikolas Bitkovskij	"Bad Habits" (Ed Sheeran)	Safe
5	Adam Pavlovčin	"Physical" (Dua Lipa)	Safe
6	Petr Jiran	"A Sky Full of Stars" (Coldplay)	Safe
7	Ladislav Hunka	"All of Me" (John Legend)	Eliminated
8	Elizabeth Kopecká	"The Show Must Go On" (Queen)	Safe

=== Top 6 ===
Order	Contestant	Song (original artist)	Result
1	Marietta Mareková	"Bad Romance" (Lady Gaga)	Eliminated
2	Elizabeth Kopecká & Petr Jiran	"Časy se mění" (Václav Neckář & Marta Kubišová)	N/A
3	Nikolas Bitkovskij	"You Are the Reason" (Calum Scott)	Safe
4	Adam Pavlovčin	"Hold Back the River" (James Bay)	Safe
5	Katarína Stohrová & Nikolas Bitkovskij	"Na srdci" (Slza & Celeste Buckingham)	N/A
6	Elizabeth Kopecká	"Rolling in the Deep" (Adele)	Safe
7	Katarína Stohrová	"Lost on You" (LP)	Safe
8	Petr Jiran	"Someone You Loved" (Lewis Capaldi)	Eliminated
9	Marietta Mareková & Adam Pavlovčin	"Pár dní" (Desmod & Zuzana Smatanová)	N/A

=== Top 4 - Grand Final ===
Order	Contestant	Song (original artist)	Result
1	Elizabeth Kopecká	"It Will Rain" (Bruno Mars)	Safe
2	Nikolas Bitkovskij	"I Want It That Way" (Backstreet Boys)	Safe
3	Adam Pavlovčin	"Arcade" (Duncan Laurence)	Safe
4	Katarína Stohrová	"Nothing Else Matters" (Metallica)	Eliminated

=== Top 3 – Grand Final ===
Order	Contestant	Song (original artist)	Result
1	Elizabeth Kopecká	"V stínu kapradiny" (Jana Kratochvílová)	Safe
2	Nikolas Bitkovskij	"Anděl" (Mirai)	Eliminated
3	Adam Pavlovčin	"Láska" (Marcel Palonder)	Safe

=== Top 2 - Grand Final ===
Order	Contestant	Song (original artist)	Result
1	Elizabeth Kopecká	"Stay" (Rihanna ft. Mikky Ekko)	Runner-up
2	Adam Pavlovčin	"Skin" (Rag'n'Bone Man)	Winner

== Elimination chart ==
Legend
Female	Male	Top 20	TOP 10	Winner

Did Not Perform	Safe	Safe First	Safe Last	Eliminated

Stage:		Semi-Final	Finals					
Week:		11/19	11/28	12/5	12/12	12/19		
Place	Contestant	Result						
1	Adam Pavlovčin	Safe	Safe	Safe	Safe	Safe	Safe	Winner
2	Elizabeth Kopecká	Safe	Safe	Safe	Safe	Safe	Safe	Runner-up
3	Nikolas Bitkovskij	Safe	Safe	Safe	Safe	Safe	Eliminated	
4	Katarína Stohrová	Safe	Safe	Safe	Safe	Eliminated		
5	Petr Jiran	Safe	Safe	Safe	Eliminated			
6	Marietta Mareková	Safe	Safe	Safe	Eliminated			
7	Adam Janota	Safe	Safe	Eliminated				
8	Ladislav Hunka	Safe	Safe	Eliminated				
9	Filip Svoboda	Safe	Eliminated					
10	Nikita Machytková	Safe	Withdrew					
Semi- Final	Valerie Kaňová	Eliminated						
Semi- Final	Dávid Bílek	Eliminated						
Semi- Final	Monika Žilková	Eliminated						
Semi- Final	Martin Duffek	Eliminated						
Semi- Final	Daniela Bakšiová	Eliminated						
Semi- Final	Kateřina Chybová	Eliminated						
Semi- Final	Angelika Kollmannová	Eliminated						
Semi- Final	Katarína Pustaiová	Eliminated						
Semi- Final	Natálie Zbuzková	Eliminated						
Semi- Final	Martin Probošt	Eliminated						

== Contestants who appeared on other seasons/shows ==
- Adam Pavlovčin competed on the first season of The Voice when he was 15 years old. He joined Team Dara Rolins and was eliminated in the Battle round.
- Nikolas Bitkovskij was a contestant in Česko Slovenská Superstar 2018 where he was eliminated before semifinal.

== Guest performances ==
Week	Performers	Song (original artist)
TOP 10	Finalist of first season of Česko hledá SuperStar (Šárka Vaňková, Sámer Issa, Tomáš Savka, Martina Balogová, Julián Záhorovský, Stanislav Dolinek, Petr Poláček, Veronika Zaňková); Aneta Langerová and Petra Páchová were not part of performance	"Veď mě dál" (Anthemn of first season of Česko hledá SuperStar)
TOP 8	Finalist of first season of Slovensko hľadá SuperStar (Katarína Koščová, Martina Šindlerová, Tomáš Bezdeda, Miro Jaroš, Samuel Tomeček, Petra Humeňanská, Martin Kelecsényi) archive footage was used for late Peter Konček part Zdenka Predná, Robo Mikla and Peter Kotuľa were not part of performance	"Kým vieš snívať" (Anthemn of first season of Slovensko hľadá SuperStar)
TOP 6	Finalist of first season of Česko Slovenská SuperStar (Martin Chodúr, Miroslav Šmajda, Jan Bendig, Monika Bagárová, Denis Lacho, Leona Šenková, Markéta Konvičková, Paulína Ištvancová, Thomas Puskailer, Nikoleta Balogová); Dominika Stará and Ben Cristovao's parts were pre-recorded	"Príbeh nekončí" (Anthemn of first season of Česko Slovenská SuperStar)
TOP 4	Ewa Farná	"Verze 02"
TOP 4	Lenka Piešová & Barbora Piešová	"Pokoj"
