= Česko Slovenská SuperStar season 6 =

Season of television series

Česko Slovenská SuperStar
- Season 6
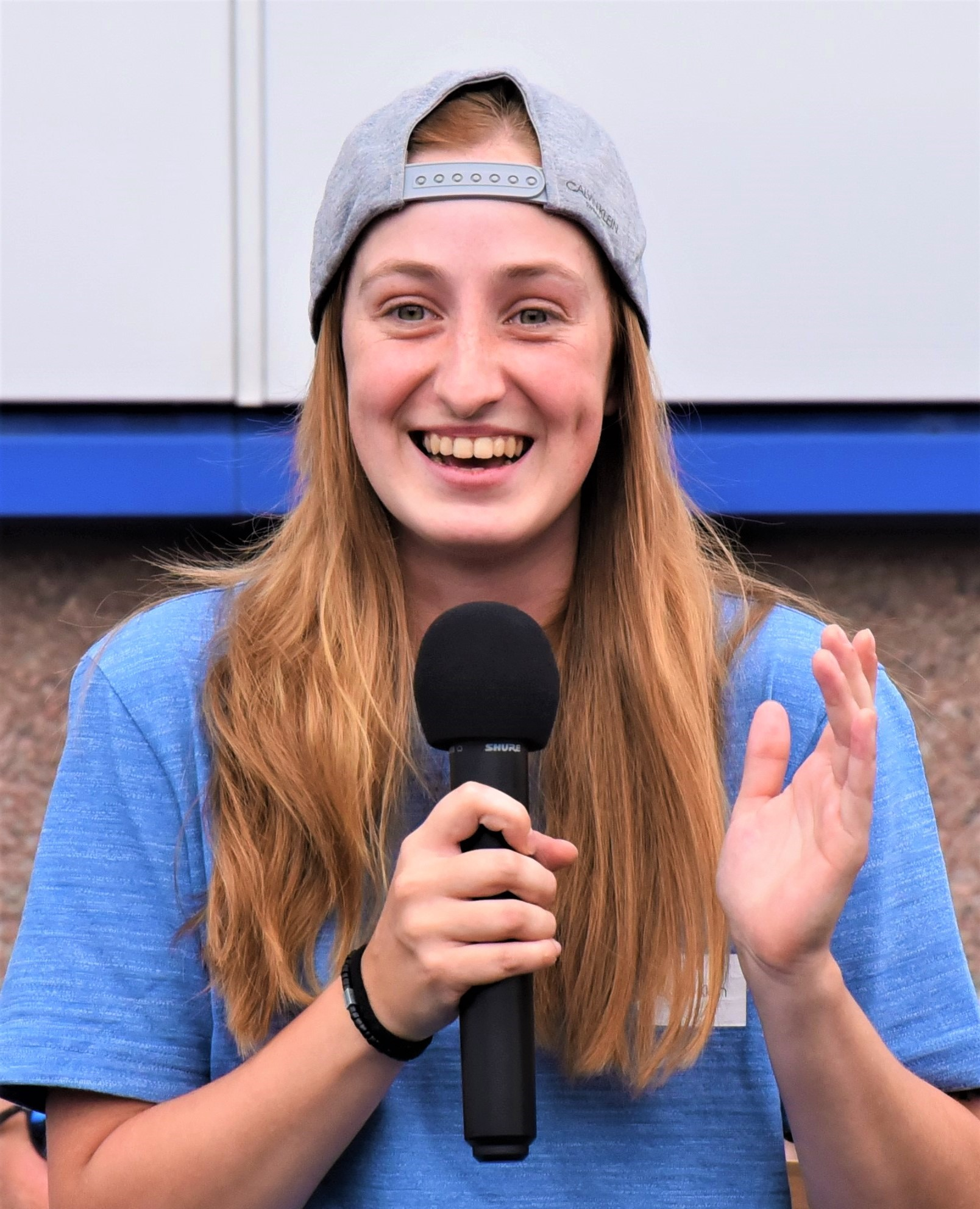
- Hosted by: Alexandra Gachulincová and Vašek Matějovský (SuperStar Xtra); Leoš Mareš (also judge and host of Live shows)
- Judges: Leoš Mareš; Patricie Pagáčová; Marián Čekovský; Monika Bagárová; Pavol Habera
- Winner: Barbora Piešová
- Runner-up: Diana Kovaľová
- Finals venue: Studio Jinonice, Prague

Release
- Original network: Nova; Markíza
- Original release: February 16 – May 31, 2020

Season chronology
- ← Previous; Season 5 Next → Season 7

Česko Slovenská SuperStar (English: Czech&Slovak SuperStar) is the joint Czech-Slovak version of Idol series' Pop Idol merged from Česko hledá SuperStar and Slovensko hľadá SuperStar which previous to that had three individual seasons each. The sixth season premiered in winter 2020 with castings held in Prague and Bratislava. It is broadcast on two channels: «TV Nova» (Czech Republic) and «Markíza» (Slovakia) which have also been the broadcast stations for the individual seasons.

Due to the COVID-19 pandemic audience were cut off from Semi-final and Final weeks were reduced from planned 5 to only 2 live shows.

== Regional auditions ==
Auditions were held in Bratislava and Prague in the autumn of 2019.

Audition City	Date
Bratislava, Slovakia	October 4–5, 2019
Prague, Czech Republic	October 19–20, 2019

== Bunker - TOP 80 ==
All 80 contestants who made it through auditions were allocated to Bunkr Drnov - Muzeum protivzdušné obrany (Drnov Bunker - Museum of Air Defense).

In the first round, the girls were called in groups of five to sing a cappella in front of the judges. Each girl had a few seconds to sing and after the entire group performed, they found out whether they were eliminated or they would continue in the next round.

The boys did not get to perform at all, the judges told them they all advanced to the next round, due to the smaller number of boys in the contest. Only five boys joined girls in this round.

The next round took place at the same night. All contestants have to perform songs of their choice in front of the judges. Not all contestants perform because some had impressed the judges before.

== Divadlo (Theater) - TOP 48 ==
48 contestants who made it through Bunker were allocated to Karlovy Vary Theater and they were divided into groups of 4. They have one day to learn song chosen by producers. All groups have session with vocal coach.

Contestant	Song	Artist	Result	Contestant	Song	Artist	Result
Jaroslav Oláh	"Baroko"	Richard Müller	Advanced	Daniel Mrózek	"Let Me Entertain You"	Robbie Williams	Eliminated
Veronika Weissová	"Baroko"	Richard Müller	Advanced	Gabriela Beranová	"Let Me Entertain You"	Robbie Williams	Eliminated
Nikola Šroubková	"Baroko"	Richard Müller	Eliminated	Júlia Kramárová	"Let Me Entertain You"	Robbie Williams	Advanced
Jaroslav Dolník	"Baroko"	Richard Müller	Advanced	Štěpán Mráz	"Let Me Entertain You"	Robbie Williams	Advanced
Michaela Hanudelová	"Lose You to Love Me"	Selena Gomez	Eliminated	Samuel Meyers	"Story of My Life"	One Direction	Eliminated
Diana Chodžajanová	"Lose You to Love Me"	Selena Gomez	Eliminated	Jan Fanta	"Story of My Life"	One Direction	Advanced
Alica Urcikánová	"Lose You to Love Me"	Selena Gomez	Eliminated	Michal Choma	"Story of My Life"	One Direction	Advanced
Nela Žáková	"Lose You to Love Me"	Selena Gomez	Eliminated	Mikuláš Hrbáček	"Story of My Life"	One Direction	Advanced
Andrea Loužecká	"The Scientist"	Coldplay	Eliminated	Silvester Roštár	"Úsmev"	Modus	Eliminated
Martin Schreiner	"The Scientist"	Coldplay	Advanced	Martina Puchalová	"Úsmev"	Modus	Eliminated
Hana Džurbanová	"The Scientist"	Coldplay	Advanced	Dominika Rovňanová	"Úsmev"	Modus	Eliminated
Miroslav Šimůnek	"The Scientist"	Coldplay	Eliminated	Tomáš Mikulka	"Úsmev"	Modus	Advanced
Vlastimír Povolný	"Let Her Go"	Passenger	Eliminated	Klára Berisha	"Telephone"	Lady Gaga ft. Beyoncé	Advanced
Dominika Lukešová	"Let Her Go"	Passenger	Advanced	Valerie Lynn	"Telephone"	Lady Gaga ft. Beyoncé	Advanced
Martina Koniariková	"Let Her Go"	Passenger	Advanced	Esther Lubadika	"Telephone"	Lady Gaga ft. Beyoncé	Advanced
Giovanni Ricci	"Let Her Go"	Passenger	Advanced	Lucie Bikárová	"Telephone"	Lady Gaga ft. Beyoncé	Advanced
Adéla Krejdlová	"Elastic Heart"	Sia	Advanced	Michal Šafrata	"Come Together"	The Beatles	Advanced
Hana Paceková	"Elastic Heart"	Sia	Eliminated	Barbora Piešová	"Come Together"	The Beatles	Advanced
Diana Kovaľová	"Elastic Heart"	Sia	Advanced	Matěj Vávra	"Come Together"	The Beatles	Advanced
Tereza Navrátilová	"Elastic Heart"	Sia	Eliminated	Sandrine Amadou Titi	"Come Together"	The Beatles	Eliminated
Václav Krušina	"Demons"	Imagine Dragons	Eliminated	Luboš Mráz	"Príbeh nekončí"	Anthem of SuperStar	Eliminated
Kamila Polonyová	"Demons"	Imagine Dragons	Eliminated	Zara Prágerová	"Príbeh nekončí"	Anthem of SuperStar	Eliminated
Timotej Májsky	"Demons"	Imagine Dragons	Advanced	Karin Křižová	"Príbeh nekončí"	Anthem of SuperStar	Advanced
Natália Kollárová	"Demons"	Imagine Dragons	Advanced	Dávid Jakubkovič	"Príbeh nekončí"	Anthem of SuperStar	Eliminated

26 contestants who made it through the first round were singing duets. Every duo will perform song chosen by production. This round is based on duels, which means from each duo the better singer will move on, but both singers could move on to the next round or both singers could be eliminated. Performances took place in Imperial Hotel in Karlovy Vary.

Contestant	Song	Artist	Result	Contestant	Song	Artist	Result
Júlia Kramárová	"Proud Mary"	Tina Turner	Advanced	Dominika Lukešová	"Someone You Loved"	Lewis Capaldi	Advanced
Klára Berisha	"Proud Mary"	Tina Turner	Advanced	Jaroslav Dolník	"Someone You Loved"	Lewis Capaldi	Eliminated
Giovanni Ricci	"Señorita"	Shawn Mendes and Camila Cabello	Advanced	Esther Lubadika	"Perfect"	Ed Sheeran	Advanced
Martina Koniariková	"Señorita"	Shawn Mendes and Camila Cabello	Advanced	Michal Choma	"Perfect"	Ed Sheeran	Eliminated
Timotej Májsky	"Dancing on My Own"	Calum Scott	Advanced	Lucie Bikárová	"Ain't No Mountain High Enough"	Marvin Gaye and Tammi Terrell	Advanced
Hana Džurbanová	"Dancing on My Own"	Calum Scott	Advanced	Jan Fanta	"Ain't No Mountain High Enough"	Marvin Gaye and Tammi Terrell	Advanced
Mikuláš Hrbáček	"Stitches"	Shawn Mendes	Advanced	Valerie Lynn	"Smooth Criminal"	Michael Jackson	Eliminated
Karin Křížová	"Stitches"	Shawn Mendes	Advanced	Matěj Vávra	"Smooth Criminal"	Michael Jackson	Advanced
Martin Schreiner	"Dusk Till Dawn"	Zayn Malik ft. Sia	Advanced	Veronika Weissová	"Angels"	Robbie Williams	Advanced
Diana Kovaľová	"Dusk Till Dawn"	Zayn Malik ft. Sia	Advanced	Štěpán Mráz	"Angels"	Robbie Williams	Eliminated
Tomáš Mikulka	"V slepých uličkách"	Marika Gombitová and Miroslav Žbirka	Eliminated	Natália Kollárová	"Don't Go Breaking My Heart"	Elton John and Kiki Dee	Eliminated
Barbora Piešová	"V slepých uličkách"	Marika Gombitová and Miroslav Žbirka	Advanced	Jaroslav Oláh	"Don't Go Breaking My Heart"	Elton John and Kiki Dee	Eliminated
Michal Šafrata	"Shallow"	Lady Gaga and Bradley Cooper	Advanced				
Adéla Krejdlová	"Shallow"	Lady Gaga and Bradley Cooper	Eliminated				

== Semi-final ==
18 contestant made it to the semi-final. From the first time semi-final is not live event and it's prerecorded also for the first time judges pick whole TOP 10. Semi-final took place in Epic Club in Prague. Semifinal took place on March 18, 2020 and due to the COVID-19 pandemic audience were cut off from this round.

=== Top 18 ===
Order	Contestant	Song (original artist)	Result
1	Matěj Vávra	"Mercy" (Shawn Mendes)	Eliminated
2	Karin Křížová	"Million Reasons" (Lady Gaga)	Eliminated
3	Dominika Lukešová	"Love Me like You Do" (Ellie Goulding)	Advanced
4	Timotej Májsky	"Crazy" (Gnarls Barkley)	Advanced
5	Klára Berisha	"If I Were a Boy" (Beyoncé)	Eliminated
6	Martin Schreiner	"Jealous" (Labrinth)	Advanced
7	Lucie Bikárová	"Don't You Worry 'bout a Thing" (Tori Kelly)	Advanced
8	Diana Kovaľová	"Hello" (Adele)	Advanced
9	Michal Šafrata	"On My Head" (Dan Bárta)	Advanced
10	Júlia Kramárová	"Hurt" (Christina Aguilera)	Advanced
11	Jan Fanta	"I'm Still Standing" (Elton John)	Eliminated
12	Martina Koniariková	"A Thousand Years" (Christina Perri)	Eliminated
13	Esther Lubadika	"I Wanna Dance with Somebody" (Whitney Houston)	Advanced
14	Hana Džurbanová	"Lásko, voníš deštěm" (Marie Rottrová)	Eliminated
15	Giovanni Ricci	"Say You Won't Let Go" (James Arthur)	Advanced
16	Veronika Weissová	"Bound to You" (Christina Aguilera)	Eliminated
17	Mikuláš Hrbáček	"Sorry" (Justin Bieber)	Eliminated
18	Barbora Piešová	"I Will Survive" (Gloria Gaynor)	Advanced

== Finalist ==
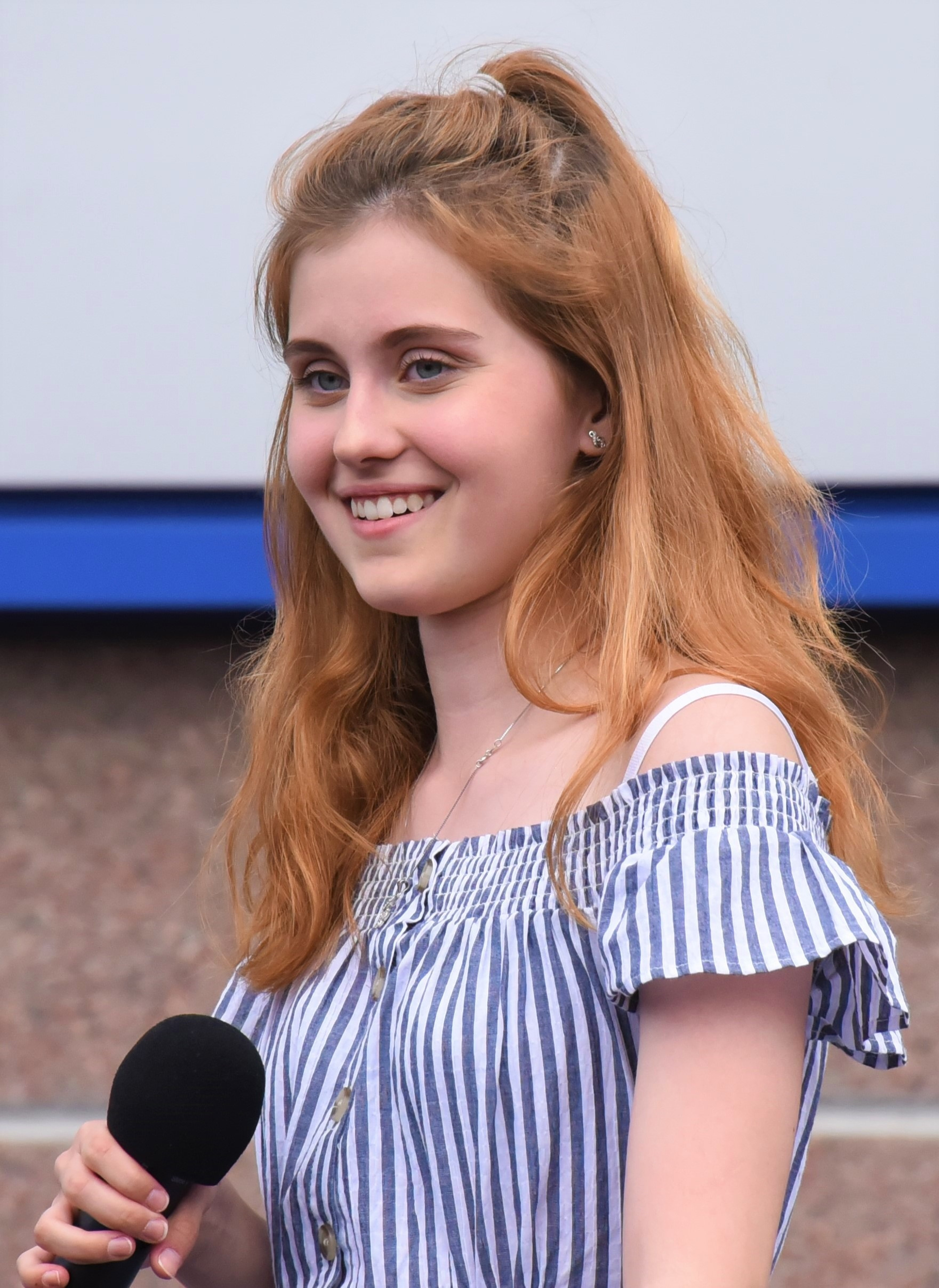
Dominika Lukešová

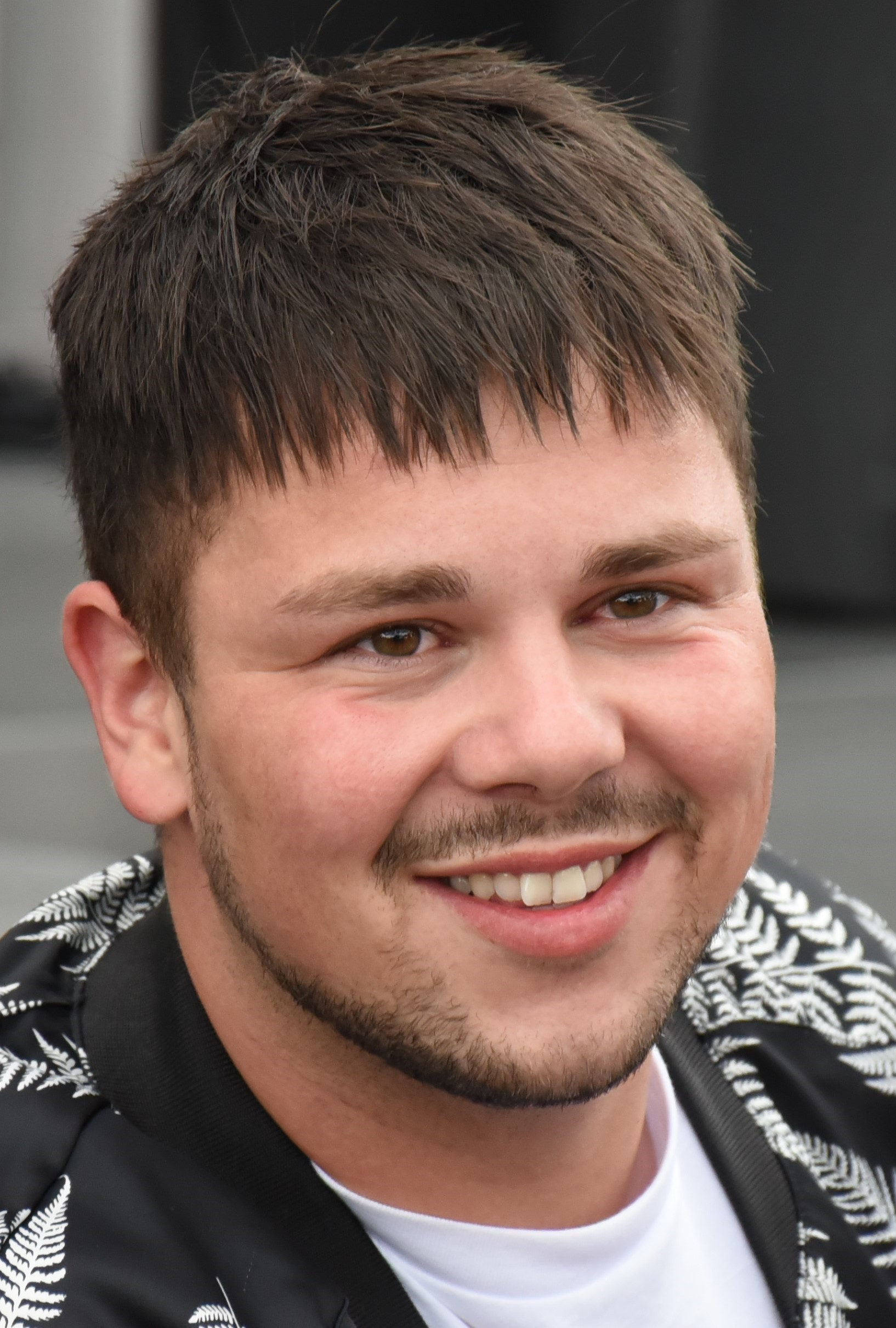
Martin Schreiner

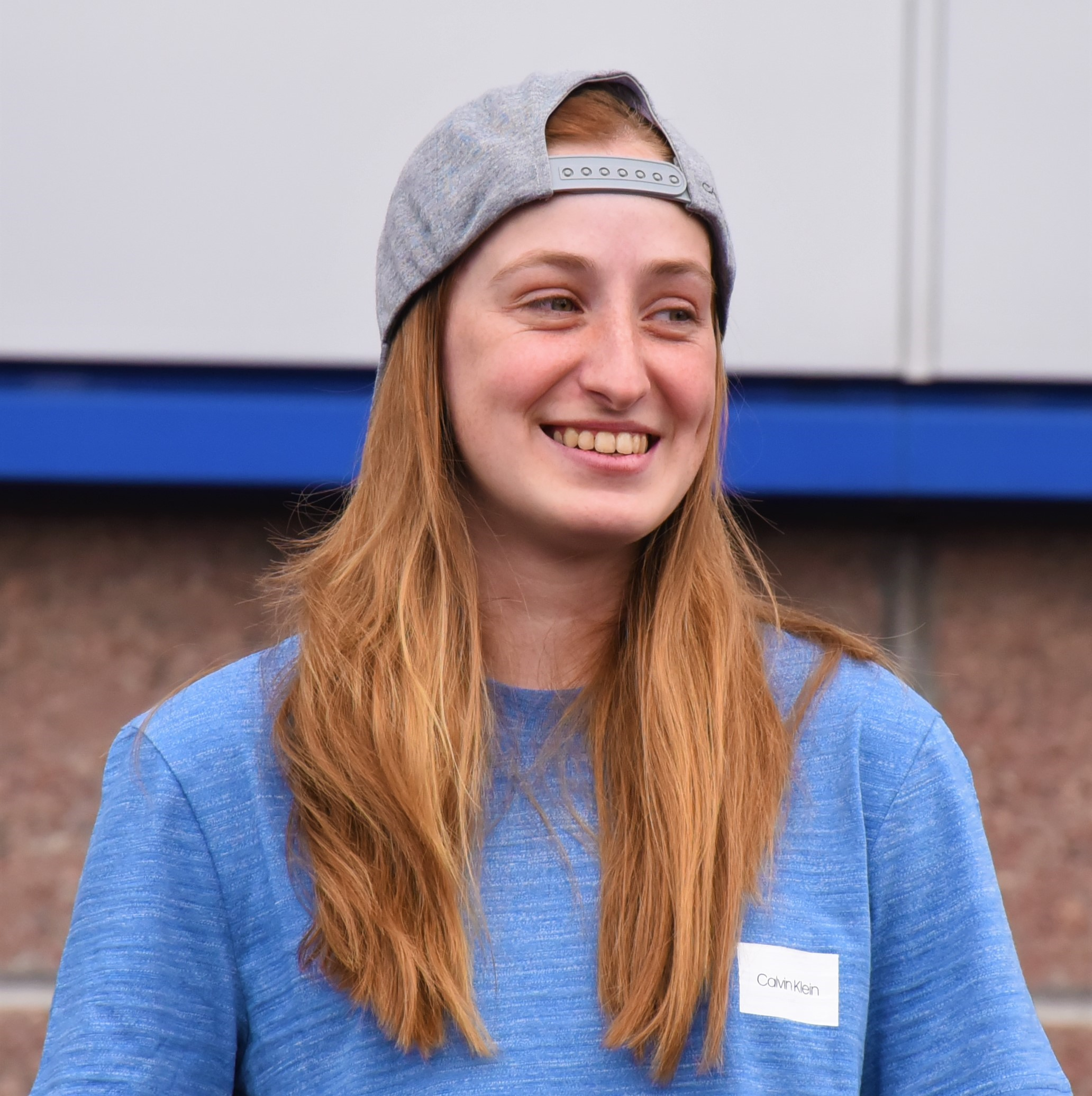
Winner Barbora Piešová

Contestant	Age	Hometown	Place finished
Barbora Piešová	19	Prievidza, Slovakia	Winner
Diana Kovaľová	15	Fuengirola, Spain	Runner-up
Martin Schreiner	22	Prague, Czech Republic	3rd
Dominika Lukešová	17	Králův Dvůr, Czech Republic	4th
Giovanni Ricci	22	Nitra, Slovakia	5th
Michal Šafrata	21	Litohoř, Czech Republic	6th - 10th
Lucie Bikárová	15	Brno, Czech Republic	6th - 10th
Esther Lubadika	28	Prague, Czech Republic	6th - 10th
Timotej Májsky	22	Púchov, Slovakia	6th - 10th
Júlia Kramárová	18	Vienna, Austria	6th - 10th

== Finals ==
Final TOP 10 will perform in two live shows. Final shows will be filmed live in Studio Jinonice in Prague. Contestant and production members from Slovakia were tested for COVID-19 before they crossed borders of Czech Republic and after return they will take quarantine. Contesntat from Czech Republic were tested in Czech Republic and Diana Kovaľová who lives in Spain was tested in Spain. Also judge Pavol Habera was tested in USA where he was during last weeks.

=== Top 10 ===
Order	Contestant	Song (original artist)	Result
1	Michal Šafrata	"Are You Gonna Go My Way" (Lenny Kravitz)	Eliminated
2	Barbora Piešová	"Somebody to Love" (Queen)	Safe
3	Lucie Bikárová	"One Night Only" (Dreamgirls)	Eliminated
4	Timotej Májsky	"Myslím, že môže byť" (IMT Smile & Marián Čekovský)	Eliminated
5	Júlia Kramárová	"The Edge of Glory" (Lady Gaga)	Eliminated
6	Dominika Lukešová	"Stay with Me" (Sam Smith)	Safe
7	Giovanni Ricci	"I Don't Care" (Ed Sheeran & Justin Bieber)	Safe
8	Martin Schreiner	"Tančíš sama" (Petr Muk)	Safe
9	Esther Lubadika	"Can't Hold Us" (Macklemore & Ryan Lewis)	Eliminated
10	Diana Kovaľová	"You Lost Me" (Christina Aguilera)	Safe

- Group performance: "Will You Be There" (Michael Jackson)

=== Top 5 - Grand Final ===
Unlike the First live show in this due lifting the quarantine in both Slovakia and Czech Republic family members will be in studio as audience. Judge Monika Bagárová will be judge via online broadcast from home in Grand final because she gave birth to a daughter 4 days before final.

Order	Contestant	Song (original artist)	Result
1	Barbora Piešová	"I'm So Excited" (The Pointer Sisters)	Safe
2	Martin Schreiner	"My Heart Will Go On" (Celine Dion)	Safe
3	Dominika Lukešová	"No Time to Die" (Billie Eilish)	Eliminated
4	Diana Kovaľová	"Set Fire to the Rain" (Adele)	Safe
5	Giovanni Ricci	"Your Song" (Elton John)	Eliminated
6	Barbora Piešová	"Milovanie v daždi" (Richard Müller)	Safe
7	Martin Schreiner	"Žal se odkládá" (Jiří Korn)	Safe
8	Dominika Lukešová	"Na ostří nože" (Ewa Farna)	Eliminated
9	Diana Kovaľová	"Voda čo ma drží nad vodou" (Elán)	Safe
10	Giovanni Ricci	"Mám ťa rád" (Karol Duchoň)	Eliminated

- Group performance: Medley of Czech and Slovak songs

=== Top 3 - Super Final ===
Order	Contestant	Song (original artist)	Result
1	Diana Kovaľová	"Someone You Loved" (Lewis Capaldi)	Runner-up
2	Martin Schreiner	"Say Something" (A Great Big World and Christina Aguilera)	Eliminated
3	Barbora Piešová	"Next to Me" (Imagine Dragons)	Winner

== Elimination chart ==
Legend
Female	Male	Top 18	Top 10	Winner

Did Not Perform	Safe	Safe First	Safe Last	Eliminated

Stage:		Semi-Final	Finals			
Week:		5/17	5/24	5/31		
Place	Contestant	Result				
1	Barbora Piešová	Safe	Safe	Safe	Safe	Winner
2	Diana Kovaľová	Safe	Safe	Safe	Safe	Runner-up
3	Martin Schreiner	Safe	Safe	Safe	Eliminated	
4	Dominika Lukešová	Safe	Safe	Eliminated		
5	Giovanni Ricci	Safe	Safe	Eliminated		
6-10	Lucie Bikárová	Safe	Eliminated			
6-10	Michal Šafrata	Safe	Eliminated			
6-10	Timotej Májsky	Safe	Eliminated			
6-10	Júlia Kramárová	Safe	Eliminated			
6-10	Esther Lubadika	Safe	Eliminated			
Semi- Final	Klára Berisha	Eliminated				
Semi- Final	Martina Koniariková	Eliminated				
Semi- Final	Jan Fanta	Eliminated				
Semi- Final	Veronika Weissová	Eliminated				
Semi- Final	Matěj Vávra	Eliminated				
Semi- Final	Mikuláš Hrbáček	Eliminated				
Semi- Final	Karin Křížová	Eliminated				
Semi- Final	Hana Džurbanová	Eliminated				

== Contestants who appeared on other seasons/shows ==
- Matěj Vávra was a finalist on X Factor season 1.
- Esther Lubadika was a semi-finalist on Česko Slovensko má talent season 3.
- Jan Fanta appeared on Česko Slovensko má talent season 7 but didn't make it through the audition.
- Daniel Mrózek was an artist on the first season of The Voice, joined Team Josef Vojtek and eliminated during fourth Live show.
- Jaroslav Dolník was a contestant from Česko Slovenská Superstar 2009 where he was eliminated during audition.
- Júlia Kramárová was a contestant from Deutschland sucht den Superstar season 17. She was eliminated in TOP 40.
