= Česko Slovenská SuperStar season 1 =

Season of television series

Česko Slovenská SuperStar
- Season 1
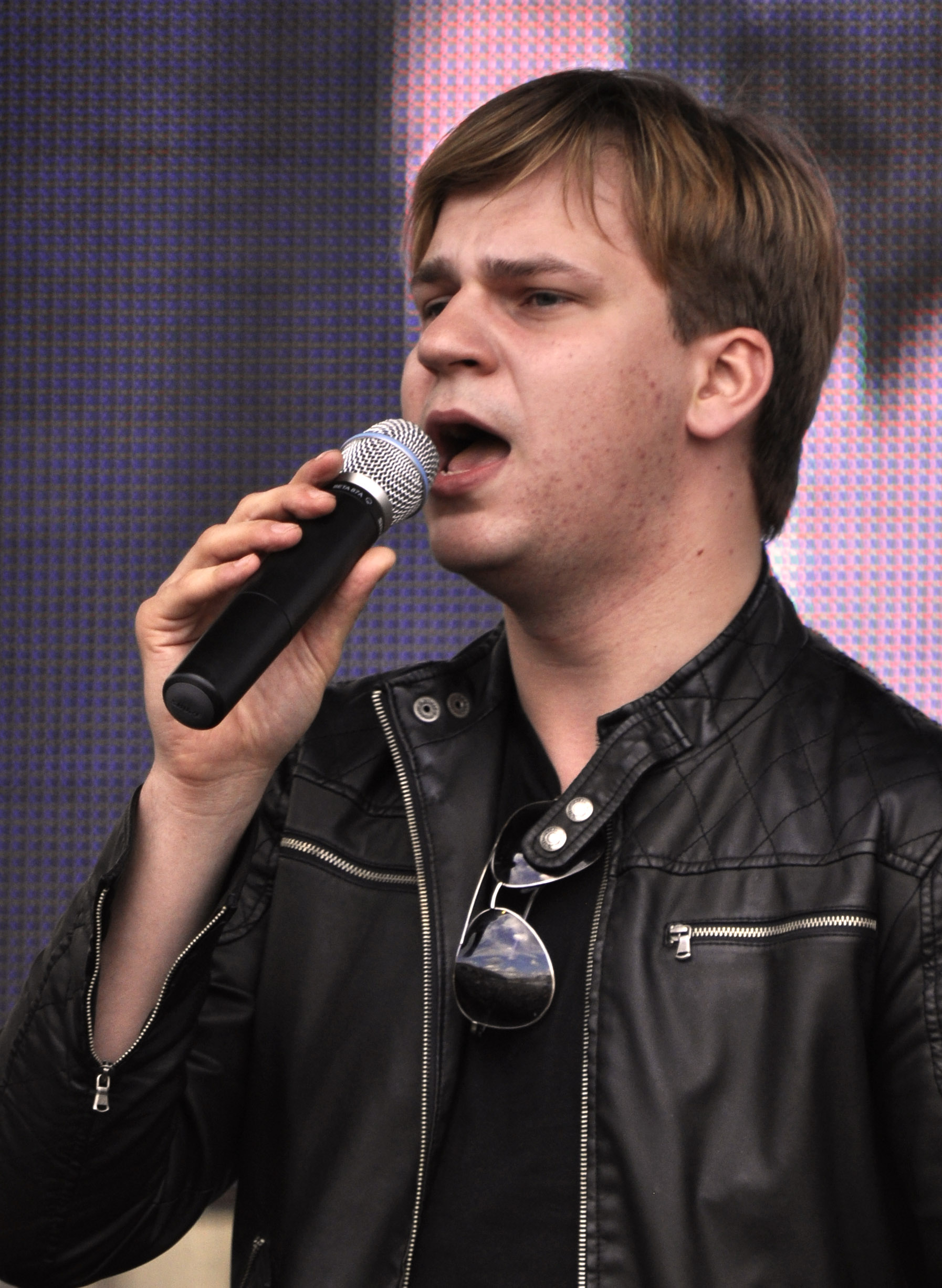
- Hosted by: Leoš Mareš; Adela Banášová
- Judges: Ondřej Hejma; Dara Rolins; Marta Jandová; Pavol Habera
- Winner: Martin Chodúr
- Runner-up: Miroslav Šmajda
- Finals venue: Incheba Expo Aréna Bratislava

Release
- Original network: Nova; Markíza
- Original release: September 6 – December 20, 2009

Season chronology
- Next → Season 2

Česko Slovenská SuperStar (English: Czech&Slovak SuperStar) is the joint Czech-Slovak version of Idol series' Pop Idol merged from Česko hledá SuperStar and Slovensko hľadá SuperStar which previous to that had three individual seasons each. The first season premiered in September 2009 with castings held in Prague, Brno, Bratislava and Košice. It is broadcast on two channels: TV Nova (Czech Republic) and Markíza (Slovakia) which have also been the broadcast stations for the individual seasons. Also both hosts have been their hosts countries before as have been three out of the four judges. To legitimate a fair chance for each country's contestants to reach the final, twelve of the contestants will compete split into genders and nationalities in the semifinals, guaranteeing a 50% share for each country in the top 12.

== Regional auditions ==
Auditions were held in Bratislava, Košice, Prague, Brno in the spring of 2009.

Audition City	Date
Brno, Czech Republic	June 20, 2009
Bratislava, Slovakia	June 24, 2009
Prague, Czech Republic	June 28, 2009
Košice, Slovakia	July 7, 2009

== Divadlo ==
In Divadlo where 124 contestants. The contestants first emerged on stage in groups of 9 or 10 but performed solo unaccompanied, and those who did not impress the judges were cut after the group finished their individual performances. 50 made it to the next round Dlouhá cesta. 24 contestants made it to the Semi-final.

== Semi-final ==
24 semifinalists were revealed in September when the show premiered on screen. Six boys and six girls from both countries competed for a spot in the top 12. In three Semifinals the guys performed on Saturday and the girls on Sunday night. The following Monday the lowest vote-getter from each gender and country got eliminated (the viewers could vote for contestants from both countries). It means that three Czech and Slovak boys and three Czech and Slovak girls would make the finals.

=== Top 24 – Females ===
Order	Contestant	Song (original artist)	Result
1	Aneta Galisová	"Teď královnou jsem já" (Ilona Csáková)	Safe
2	Monika Bagárová	"I Believe I Can Fly" (R. Kelly)	Safe
3	Paulína Ištvancová	"Let's Get Loud" (Jennifer Lopez)	Safe
4	Leona Šenková	"Tak já ti mávam" (Věra Špinarová)	Safe
5	Deborah Kahlová	"I Try" (Macy Gray)	Eliminated
6	Karolína Majerníková	"Sway" (Pussycat Dolls)	Safe
7	Dominika Stará	"One Night Only" (Jennifer Hudson)	Safe
8	Adriana Kopecká	"Beautiful" (Christina Aguilera)	Safe
9	Markéta Konvičková	"Umbrella" (Rihanna)	Safe
10	Dominika Maščuchová	"Vietor" (Zdenka Predná)	Eliminated
11	Lucia Láncošová	"Muoj Bože" (Katarína Knechtová)	Safe
12	Nikoleta Balogová	"Saving All My Love for You" (Whitney Houston)	Safe

=== Top 24 – Males ===
Order	Contestant	Song (original artist)	Result
1	Martin Chodúr	Venus (Shocking Blue)	Safe
2	Ján Ločaj	"Láska" (Gladiátor)	Eliminated
3	Lukáš Michna	"On My Head" (Dan Bárta)	Eliminated
4	Denis Lacho	"Hero" (Enrique Iglesias)	Safe
5	Jan Bendig	"Dám dělovou ránu" (Karel Gott)	Safe
6	Thomas Puskailer	"I'm Yours" (Jason Mraz)	Safe
7	Miroslav Šmajda	"Come As You Are" (Nirvana)	Safe
8	Marek Lacko	"Nedá sa újsť" (IMT Smile)	Safe
9	Ahmad Hedar	"Wonderwall" (Oasis)	Safe
10	Ben Cristovao	"Save Room" (John Legend)	Safe
11	Leo Machala	"Chci zas v tobě spát" (Lucie)	Safe
12	René Bošeľa	"This Love" (Maroon 5)	Safe

=== Top 20 – Females ===
Order	Contestant	Song (original artist)	Result
1	Aneta Galisová	"Rehab" (Amy Winehouse)	Safe
2	Monika Bagárová	"Spomaľ" (Katarína Knechtová)	Safe
3	Paulína Ištvancová	"More Than Words" (Extreme)	Safe
4	Leona Šenková	"Zombie" (The Cranberries)	Safe
5	Karolína Majerníková	"Because of You" (Kelly Clarkson)	Safe
6	Dominika Stará	"If You Can’t Give Me Love" (Suzi Quatro)	Safe
7	Adriana Kopecká	"Hvězdy jako hvězdy" (Lucie Bílá)	Eliminated
8	Markéta Konvičková	"Pro mě jsi" (4Life)	Safe
9	Lucia Láncošová	"The Boy Does Nothing" (Alesha Dixon)	Eliminated
10	Nikoleta Balogová	"Hopelessly Devoted to You" (Olivia Newton-John)	Safe

=== Top 20 – Males ===
Order	Contestant	Song (original artist)	Result
1	Martin Chodúr	"Lady Carneval" (Karel Gott)	Safe
2	Denis Lacho	"Sorry Seems to Be the Hardest Word" (Elton John)	Safe
3	Jan Bendig	"Podvod" (Jan Nedvěd)	Safe
4	Thomas Puskailer	"Jessie" (Joshua Kadison)	Safe
5	Miroslav Šmajda	"Wicked Game" (Chris Isaak)	Safe
6	Marek Lacko	"Wild World" (Cat Stevens)	Safe
7	Ahmad Hedar	"Otherside" (Red Hot Chili Peppers)	Eliminated
8	Ben Cristovao	"Let's Stay Together" (Al Green)	Safe
9	Leo Machala	"When You Believe" (Leon Jackson)	Safe
10	René Bošeľa	"Krisínka iba spí" (Peter Nagy)	Eliminated

=== Top 16 – Females ===
Order	Contestant	Song (original artist)	Result
1	Aneta Galisová	"Take a Bow" (Rihanna)	Eliminated
2	Monika Bagárová	"Fun Day" (Stevie Wonder)	Safe
3	Paulína Ištvancová	"Can't Take My Eyes Off You" (Lauryn Hill)	Safe
4	Leona Šenková	"Lásko voníš deštěm" (Marie Rottrová)	Safe
5	Karolína Majerníková	"Somewhere Over the Rainbow" (Eva Cassidy)	Eliminated
6	Dominika Stará	"Je suis malade" (Lara Fabian)	Safe
7	Markéta Konvičková	"There You'll Be" (Faith Hill)	Safe
8	Nikoleta Balogová	"Ben" (Michael Jackson)	Safe

=== Top 16 – Males ===
Order	Contestant	Song (original artist)	Result
1	Martin Chodúr	"Hallelujah" (Leonard Cohen)	Safe
2	Denis Lacho	"Myslím, že môže byť" (IMT Smile)	Safe
3	Jan Bendig	"If I Ain't Got You" (Alicia Keys)	Safe
4	Thomas Puskailer	"Ain't No Sunshine" (Bill Withers)	Safe
5	Miroslav Šmajda	"Home" (Daughtry)	Safe
6	Marek Lacko	"Where Ever You Will Go" (The Calling)	Eliminated
7	Ben Cristovao	"Family Portrait" (Pink)	Safe
8	Leo Machala	"Angels" (Robbie Williams)	Eliminated

== Finalist ==
Contestant	Age	Hometown	Place Finished
Martin Chodúr	20	Ostrava, Czech Republic	Winner
Miroslav Šmajda	22	Košice, Slovakia	Runner-up
Dominika Stará	15	Šamorín, Slovakia	3rd
Jan Bendig	15	Hradec Králové, Czech Republic	4th
Monika Bagárová	15	Brno, Czech Republic	5th
Denis Lacho	15	Bratislava, Slovakia	6th
Ben Cristovao	22	Prague, Czech Republic	7th
Leona Šenková	16	Přelouč, Czech Republic	8th
Markéta Konvičková	15	Třinec, Czech Republic	9th
Paulína Ištvancová	16	Dolná Krupá, Slovakia	10th
Thomas Puskailer	28	London, United Kingdom	11th
Nikoleta Balogová	17	Lučenec, Slovakia	12th

== Finals ==
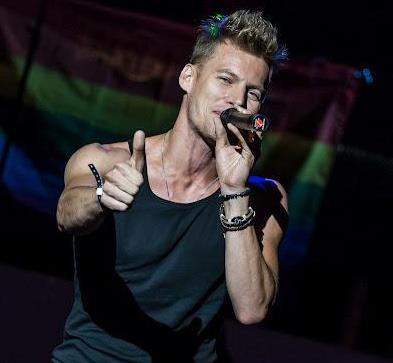
Thomas Puskailer

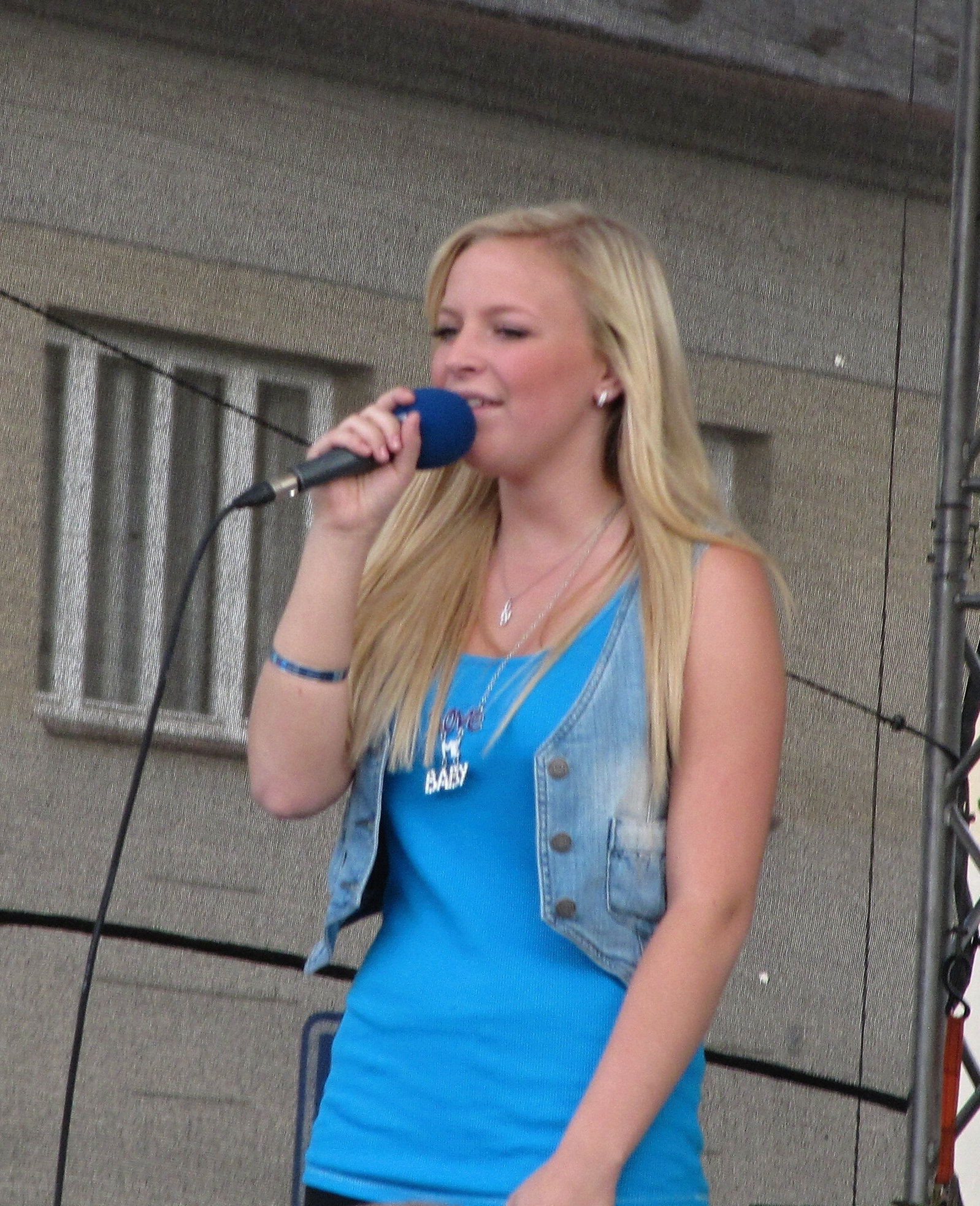
Markéta Konvičková

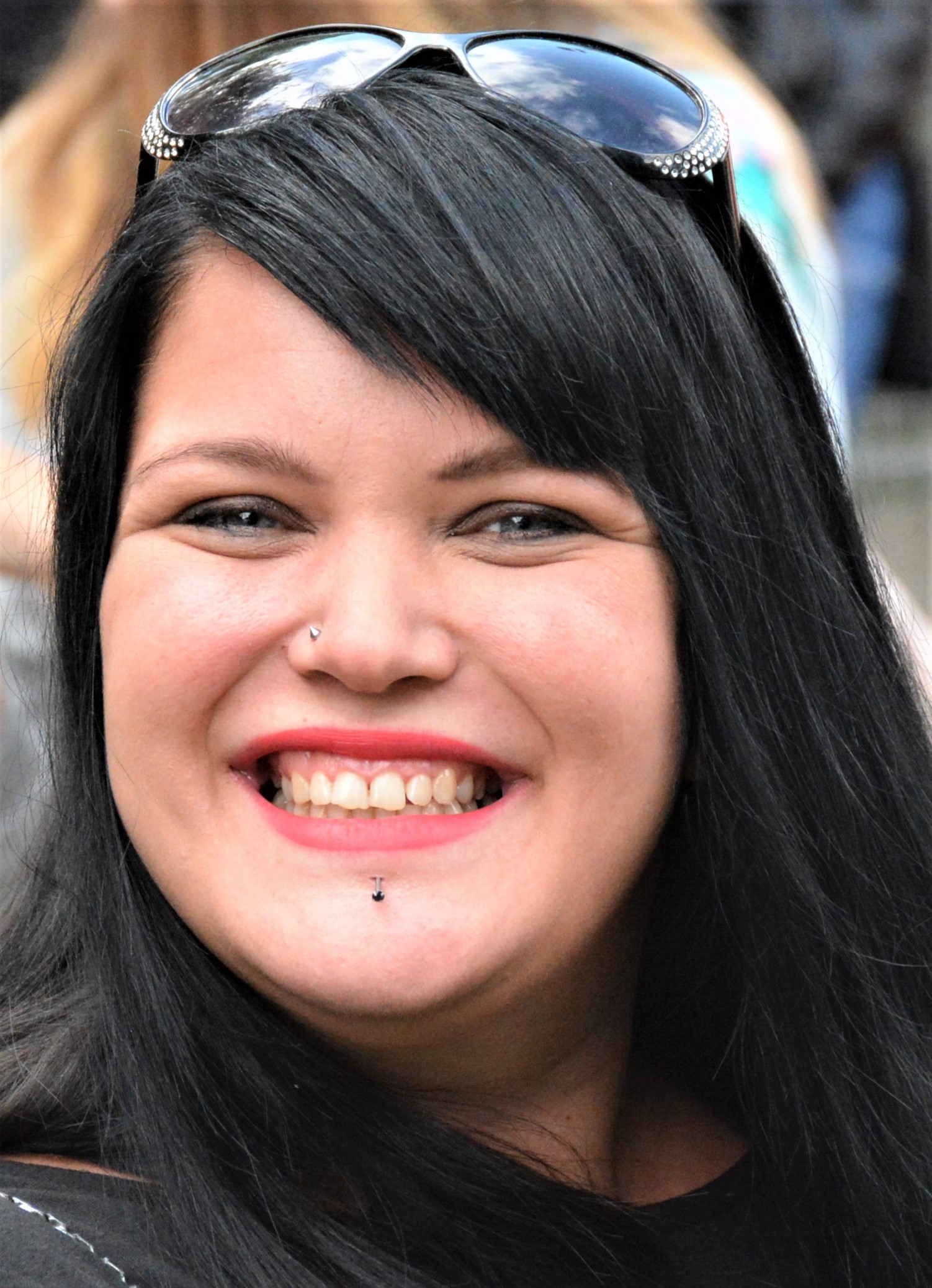
Leona Šenková

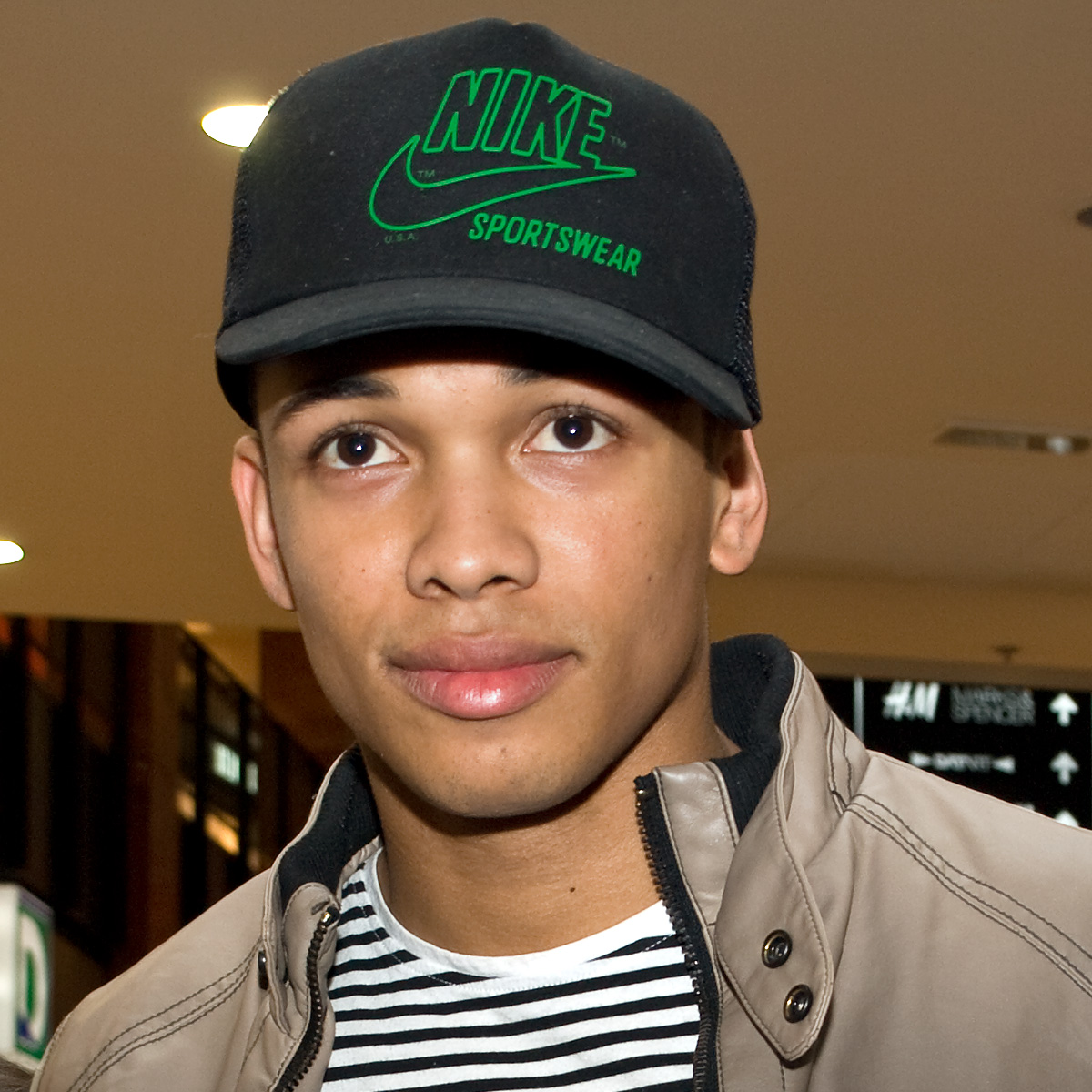
Ben Cristovao

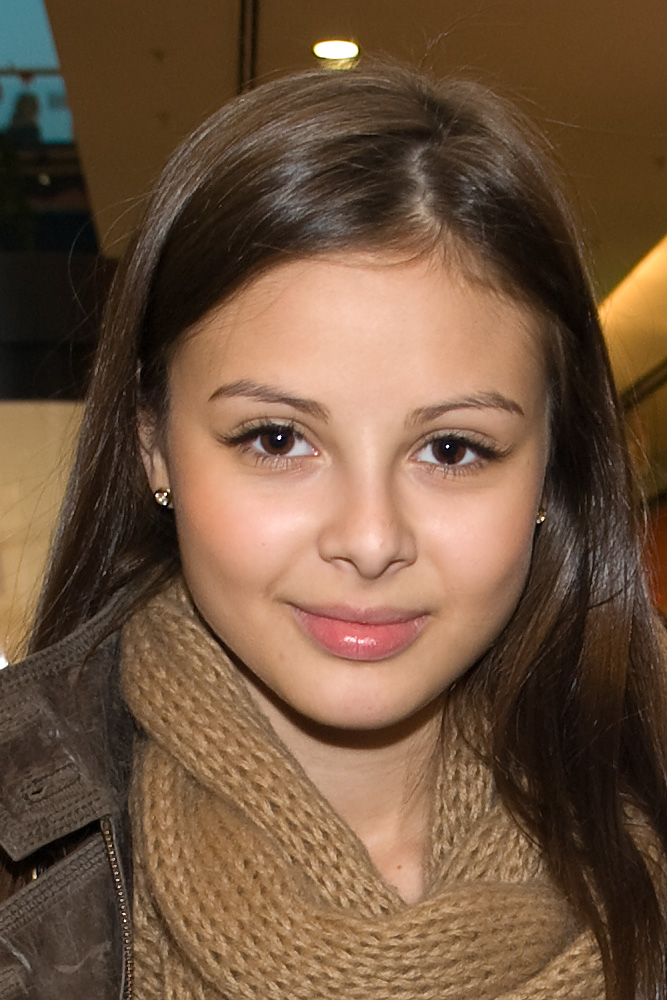
Monika Bagárová

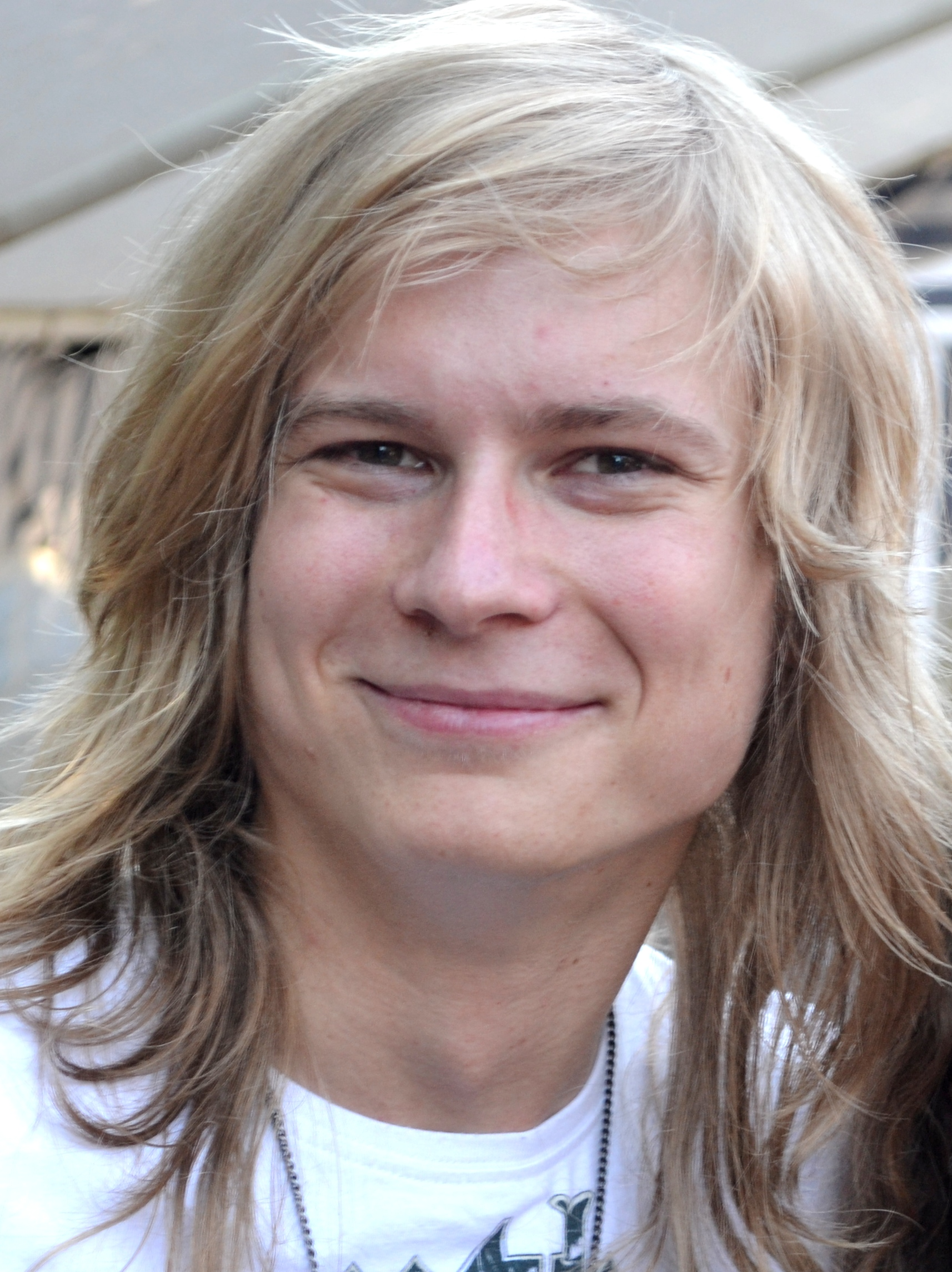
Miroslav Šmajda

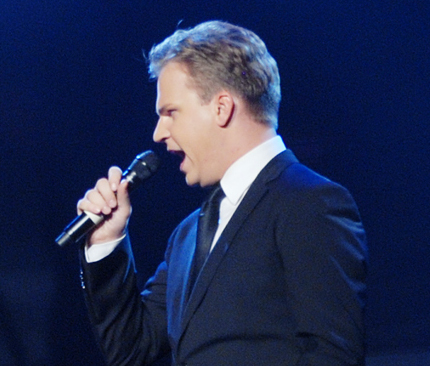
Winner Martin Chodúr

Twelve contestants reached the finals. TOP 12 consisted of 3 Slovak boys, 3 Czech boys, 3 Slovak girls and 3 Czech girls. The first single recorded by TOP 12 is called "Příběh Nekončí / Príbeh Nekončí" (The Story Doesn't End) and it was composed by judge Pavol Habera (music) and Slovak poet Daniel Hevier. Every final night had a different theme. The audience could vote for contestants from the very beginning of the show, voting ended during the result show the following day. There were double eliminations in first two final rounds, with only one contestant being eliminated once the candidates became the TOP 8. All gender and nationality quotas are abolished in the finals.

=== Top 12 – My Idol ===
Order	Contestant	Song (original artist)	Result
1	Nikoleta Balogová	"Listen" (Beyoncé Knowles)	Eliminated
2	Jan Bendig	"Hero" (Mariah Carey)	Safe
3	Monika Bagárová	"Say a Little Prayer" (Aretha Franklin)	Safe
4	Ben Cristovao	"My Love" (Justin Timberlake)	Safe
5	Martin Chodúr	"A Little Less Conversation" (Elvis Presley)	Safe
6	Paulína Ištvancová	"Black or White" (Michael Jackson)	Bottom 3
7	Markéta Konvičková	"I Bruise Easily" (Natasha Bedingfield)	Safe
8	Denis Lacho	"You Give Me Something" (James Morrison)	Safe
9	Thomas Puskailer	"Beggin'" (Madcon)	Eliminated
10	Dominika Stará	"You Came" (Kim Wilde)	Safe
11	Leona Šenková	"Just Like a Pill" (Pink)	Safe
12	Miroslav Šmajda	"Stairway to Heaven" (Led Zeppelin)	Safe

=== Top 10 – Big Band ===
Order	Contestant	Song (original artist)	Result
1	Jan Bendig	"Stand By Me" (Ben E. King)	Bottom 3
2	Monika Bagárová	"You've Got a Friend" (Carole King)	Safe
3	Ben Cristovao	"Fly Me To The Moon" (Frank Sinatra)	Safe
4	Martin Chodúr	"Feeling Good" (Michael Bublé)	Safe
5	Paulína Ištvancová	"Valerie" (Amy Winehouse)	Eliminated
6	Markéta Konvičková	"(Where Do I Begin?) Love Story" (Shirley Bassey)	Eliminated
7	Denis Lacho	"Singing in the Rain" (Gene Kelly)	Safe
8	Dominika Stará	"Vyznanie" (Marika Gombitová)	Safe
9	Leona Šenková	"Modlitba pro Martu" (Marta Kubišová)	Safe
10	Miroslav Šmajda	"Voda čo ma drží nad vodou" (Elán)	Safe

=== Top 8 – Michael Jackson vs. Madonna ===
Order	Contestant	Song (original artist)	Result
1	Jan Bendig	"Heal the World" (Michael Jackson)	Safe
2	Monika Bagárová	"This Used to Be My Playground" (Madonna)	Bottom 3
3	Ben Cristovao	"Don't Tell Me" (Madonna)	Safe
4	Martin Chodúr	"Billie Jean" (Michael Jackson)	Safe
5	Denis Lacho	"You Are Not Alone" (Michael Jackson)	Bottom 3
6	Dominika Stará	"Like a Virgin" (Madonna)	Safe
7	Leona Šenková	"Beat It" (Michael Jackson)	Eliminated
8	Miroslav Šmajda	"Dirty Diana" (Michael Jackson)	Safe

=== Top 7 – Rock ===
Order	Contestant	Song (original artist)	Result
1	Jan Bendig	"Don't Stop Me Now" (Queen)	Safe
2	Monika Bagárová	"Hot n Cold" (Katy Perry)	Bottom 3
1	Ben Cristovao	"American Woman" (Lenny Kravitz)	Eliminated
3	Martin Chodúr	"Crazy" (Aerosmith)	Safe
5	Denis Lacho	"Always" (Jon Bon Jovi)	Bottom 3
6	Dominika Stará	"Nothing Compares 2 U" (Sinéad O'Connor)	Safe
7	Miroslav Šmajda	"Smoke On the Water" (Deep Purple)	Safe

=== Top 6 – Karel Gott and Duets ===
Mentor: Karel Gott

Order	Contestant	Song (original artist)	Result
1	Jan Bendig	"Cesta rájem" (Karel Gott)	Bottom 3
2	Monika Bagárová	"Už z hor zní zvon" (Karel Gott)	Bottom 3
3	Martin Chodúr	"Oči sněhem zaváte" (Karel Gott)	Safe
4	Denis Lacho	"Včelka Mája" (Karel Gott)	Eliminated
5	Dominika Stará	"Lásko má" (Karel Gott)	Safe
6	Miroslav Šmajda	"C'est la vie" (Karel Gott)	Safe
7	Miroslav Šmajda & Dominika Stará	"We've Got Tonight" (Ronan Keating) & (Lulu)	N/A
8	Martin Chodúr & Jan Bendig	"Don't Let the Sun Go Down on Me" (George Michael) & (Elton John)	N/A
9	Monika Bagárová & Denis Lacho	"Endless Love" (Luther Vandross) & (Mariah Carey)	N/A

=== Top 5 – MTV ===
Order	Contestant	Song (original artist)	Result
1	Jan Bendig	"Take On Me" (A-ha)	Bottom 3
2	Monika Bagárová	"Sweet Dreams" (Beyoncé Knowles)	Eliminated
3	Martin Chodúr	"Are You Gonna Go My Way" (Lenny Kravitz)	Safe
4	Dominika Stará	"Complocated" (Avril Lavigne)	Safe
5	Miroslav Šmajda	"Welcome to the Jungle" (Guns N' Roses)	Bottom 3
6	Jan Bendig	"Why" (Annie Lennox)	Bottom 3
7	Monika Bagárová	"Fallin'" (Alicia Keys)	Eliminated
8	Martin Chodúr	"Everybody Hurts" (R.E.M.)	Safe
9	Dominika Stará	"Tears in Heaven" (Eric Clapton)	Safe
10	Miroslav Šmajda	"Cry Me a River" (Justin Timberlake)	Bottom 3

=== Top 4 – Movie Songs and Michal David ===
Mentor: Michal David

Order	Contestant	Song (original artist)	Result
1	Jan Bendig	"My Heart Will Go On" (Céline Dion)	Eliminated
2	Martin Chodúr	"Maria" (West Side Story)	Safe
3	Dominika Stará	"Memory" (Barbra Streisand)	Safe
4	Miroslav Šmajda	"We Are The Champions & We Will Rock You" (Queen)	Bottom 2
5	Jan Bendig	"Discopříběh" (Michal David)	Eliminated
6	Martin Chodúr	"Každý mi tě lásko závidí" (Michal David)	Safe
7	Dominika Stará	"Děti ráje" (Michal David)	Safe
8	Miroslav Šmajda	"Je to blízko" (Michal David)	Bottom 2

=== Top 3 – Richard Müller and Unplugged ===
Mentor: Richard Müller

Order	Contestant	Song (original artist)	Result
1	Martin Chodúr	"Rozeznávam" (Richard Müller)	Safe
2	Dominika Stará	"Štěstí je krásná věc" (Richard Müller)	Eliminated
3	Miroslav Šmajda	"Srdce jako kníže Rohan" (Richard Müller)	Safe
4	Martin Chodúr	" Cigaretka na 2 ťahy" (Richard Müller)	Safe
5	Dominika Stará	"Tlaková níž" (Michal David)	Eliminated
6	Miroslav Šmajda	"Nebude to ľahké" (Richard Müller)	Safe
7	Martin Chodúr	"Paparazzi " (Lady Gaga)	Safe
8	Dominika Stará	"Alone " (Heart)	Eliminated
3	Miroslav Šmajda	"Dream On" (Aerosmith)	Safe

=== Top 2 – Finale ===
Order	Contestant	Song (original artist)	Result
1	Martin Chodúr	"I Heard it Through the Grapevine" (Marvin Gaye)	Winner
2	Miroslav Šmajda	"Watch Over You" (Alter Bridge)	Runner-up
3	Martin Chodúr	"White Christmas" (Bing Crosby)	Winner
4	Miroslav Šmajda	"Last Christmas" (Wham!)	Runner-up
5	Martin Chodúr	"Supreme" (Robbie Williams)	Winner
6	Miroslav Šmajda	"C´est La Vie" (Karel Gott)	Runner-up

- TOP 12 Performance: Do They Know It's Christmas?

== Elimination chart ==
Legend
Female	Male	Top 24	Top 12	Winner

Safe	Safe First	Safe Last	Eliminated

Stage:		Semi Finals			Finals								
Week:		10/5	10/12	10/19	10/26	11/2	11/9	11/16	11/23	11/30	12/7	12/14	12/20
Place	Contestant	Result											
1	Martin Chodúr	Safe	Safe	Safe	Safe	Safe	Safe	Safe	Safe	Safe	Safe	Safe	Winner
2	Miroslav Šmajda	Safe	Safe	Safe	Safe	Safe	Safe	Safe	Safe	Bottom 3	Bottom 2	Safe	Runner-up
3	Dominika Stará	Safe	Safe	Safe	Safe	Safe	Safe	Safe	Safe	Safe	Safe	Eliminated	
4	Jan Bendig	Safe	Safe	Safe	Safe	Bottom 3	Safe	Safe	Bottom 2	Bottom 2	Eliminated		
5	Monika Bagárová	Safe	Safe	Safe	Safe	Safe	Bottom 3	Bottom 3	Bottom 3	Eliminated			
6	Denis Lacho	Safe	Safe	Safe	Safe	Safe	Bottom 2	Bottom 2	Eliminated				
7	Ben Cristovao	Safe	Safe	Safe	Safe	Safe	Safe	Eliminated					
8	Leona Šenková	Safe	Safe	Safe	Safe	Safe	Eliminated						
9	Markéta Konvičková	Safe	Safe	Safe	Safe	Eliminated							
10	Paulína Ištvancová	Safe	Safe	Safe	Bottom 3	Eliminated							
11	Thomas Puskailer	Safe	Safe	Safe	Eliminated								
12	Nikoleta Balogová	Safe	Safe	Safe	Eliminated								
13-16	Aneta Galisová	Safe	Safe	Eliminated									
13-16	Marek Lacko	Safe	Safe	Eliminated									
13-16	Leo Machala	Safe	Safe	Eliminated									
13-16	Karolína Majerníková	Safe	Safe	Eliminated									
17-20	René Bošeľa	Safe	Eliminated										
17-20	Adriana Kopecká	Safe	Eliminated										
17-20	Ahmad Hedar	Safe	Eliminated										
17-20	Lucia Lancošová	Safe	Eliminated										
21-24	Deborah Kahlová	Eliminated											
21-24	Ján Ločaj	Eliminated											
21-24	Dominika Maščuchová	Eliminated											
21-24	Lukáš Michna	Eliminated											

== Contestants who appeared on other seasons/shows ==
- Lucia Láncošová was a semi-finalist on Slovensko má talent.
