= Monika Bagárová =

Czech singer (born 1994)

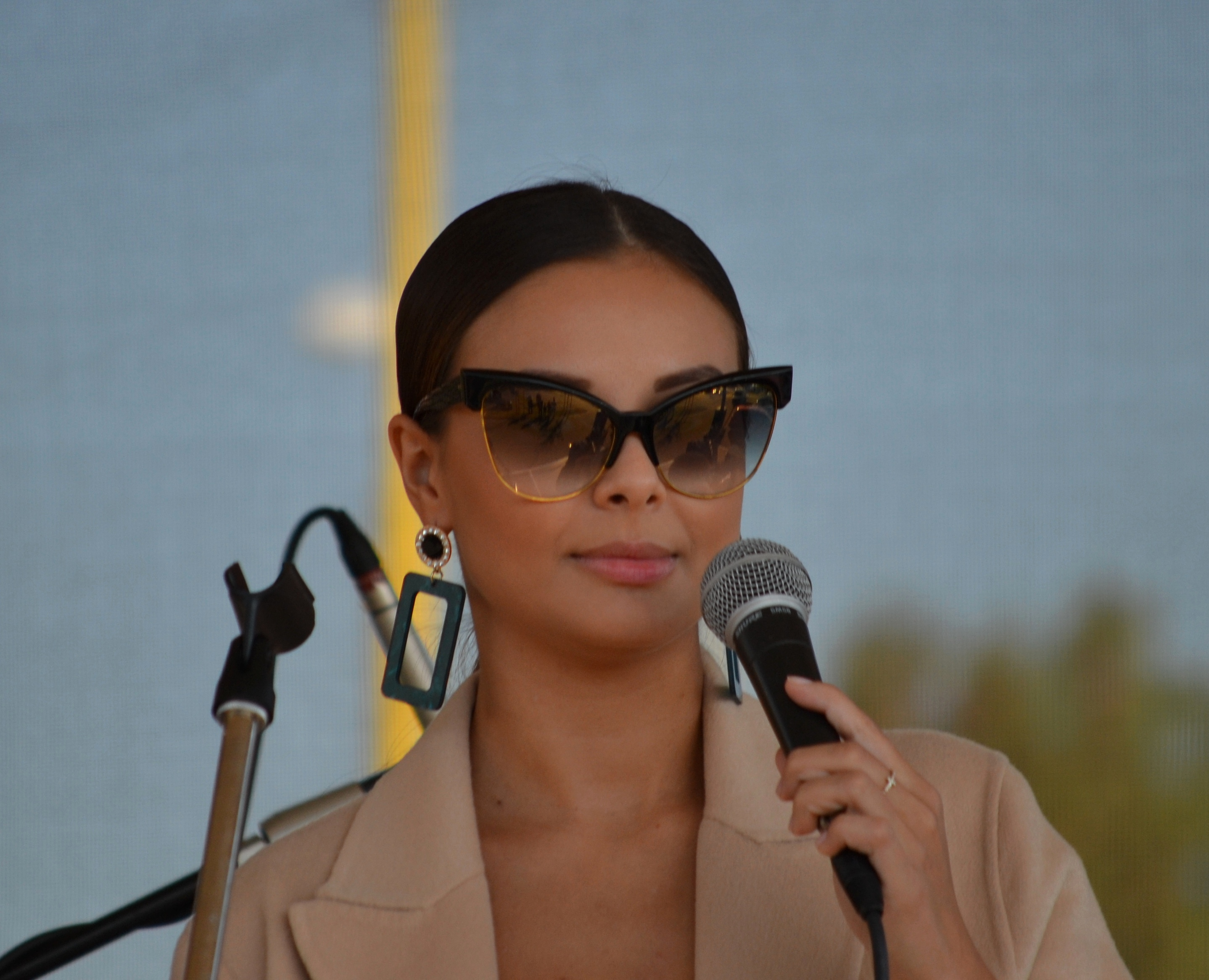
- Bagárová in 2018

Background information
- Born: 5 July 1994 (age 31); Brno, Czech Republic
- Genres: Soul; R&B
- Occupation: Singer
- Instrument: Vocals
- Years active: 2009–present
- Labels: Warner Music
- Website: bagarova.cz

Monika Bagárová (born 5 July 1994) is a Czech singer. In 2009, she competed in the first season of the Česko Slovenská SuperStar (Czech-Slovak version of Pop Idol), where she finished fifth, the most successful Czech female participant in the competition.

== Life and career ==
Monika Bagárová was born on 5 July 1994 in Brno. In 2009, she participated in the Česko Slovenská SuperStar competition and placed fifth. The following year, she began working with Rob Opatovský, with whom she sang the song "Prší".

2011 proved to be a turning point for Bagárová: she released her debut album, Shining, which included "I want", a duet with Benny Cristo. For the album, Bagárová won the Best Newcomer prize at the Český slavík awards in 2011. In 2012, she was cast in the romantic film Definice lásky. In 2013, Bagárová released a new single, "Let Me Love U", which foreshadowed the album she was working on. The following year, she recorded the song "Skús zabudnúť" with Igor Kmet in Slovakia.

Bagárová's second album, titled Flashback, was released in 2017.

In 2018, she participated in the ninth season of the StarDance competition, finishing in tenth place. In 2020, she became a juror on the sixth season of Česko Slovenská SuperStar.

== Personal life ==
Bagárová dated singer and fellow SuperStar contestant Benny Cristo from 2009 to 2012. In 2017, she started a relationship with Slovak drummer Dávid Hodek. The two broke up in the summer of 2018. In December 2018, Bagárová began dating MMA fighter Makhmud Muradov. They welcomed their first child, daughter Rumia, on 27 May 2020. In December 2021, Bagárová announced the couple had split. However, in February 2022, she confirmed they had reconciled. They separated again in July 2022. She began a relationship with Albanian businessman Leonard Lekaj in December 2022.

== Discography ==
Studio albums

- Shining (2011)
- Flashback (2017)
- Silnější (2022)

Singles

- "Prší" (Robo Opatovský feat. Monika Bagárová) (2010)
- "Let Me Love U" (2013)
- "Skus zabudnúť" (Igor Kmeťo feat. Monika Bagárová) (2014)
- "Never Had" (2015)
- "Little Piece of Heaven" (2017)
- "Offline" (2018)
- "Zůstaň se mnou" (feat. Markéta Konvičková) (2019)
- "Viva La Vida" (Jan Bendig feat. Monika Bagárová) (2019)
- "Sestra" (feat. Natalii) (2019)
- "Stay" (D-Fly feat. Monika Bagárová) (2019)
- "Like" (feat. Natalii) (2020)
