= Gump: The Dog That Taught People How to Live =

- Directed by: F. A. Brabec
- Written by: Filip Rožek, Lukáš Fišer
- Starring: Ivan Trojan; Bolek Polívka
- Cinematography: F. A. Brabec
- Distributed by: Bioscop
- Release date: 22 July 2021
- Running time: 90 minutes
- Country: Czech Republic
- Language: Czech
- Box office: 25,618,012 CZK

Gump: The Dog That Taught People How to Live (Czech: Gump – pes, který naučil lidi žít, also known simply as Gump) is a 2021 Czech adventure family film directed by F. A. Brabec. The script was written by Filip Rožek and Lukáš Fišer.

In addition to canine actors, Bolek Polívka, Eva Holubová, Ivana Chýlková, Karel Roden, Richard Krajčo, Jana Plodková, Marek Taclík, Patricie Pagáčová, Olga Lounová, Zbigniew Czendlik, Hana Holišová, Nela Boudová, Karlos Vémola and others appear in the film.

The film is based on the book of the same name by Filip Rožek, which was published in 2019. In 2020, the book received the Readers' Award at the annual Magnesia Litera book awards. Filmmakers decided to change the ending of the story. The Czech premiere of the film took place on July 22, 2021, the distributor is Bioscop.

The song "Vítr do plachet" (Wind in Sails) was written and sung by Marek Ztracený for the film.

== Cast ==
- Bolek Polívka as Béďa (Bedřich Kozí bobek)
- Eva Holubová as Veronika Rybička
- Ivana Chýlková as Dáša Nemocnice
- Richard Krajčo as Oříšek
- Ivan Trojan as Gump (voice only)
- Karel Roden as Veterinarian
- Jana Plodková as Kristýna Sušenka
- Patricie Pagáčová as Káťa AKA Louka
- Marek Taclík as Tlustý
- Zbigniew Jan Czendik as Farář
- Hana Holišová as Tlustý's wife
- Olga Lounová as Piškot
- Nela Boudová as Granule
- Karin Krajčo Babinská as Martina
- Anna Šulcová as nurse
- Natálie Rožková as Naty Jahoda

== Sequel ==
Sequel to the film called Gump – jsme dvojka (Gump – we are duo) is set to premiere in 2024.
