= Ranč U Zelené sedmy =

- Genre: Drama
- Directed by: Miroslav Balajka
- Starring: Miroslav Noga, Milena Steinmasslová
- Country of origin: Czech Republic
- Original language: Czech
- No. of seasons: 3
- No. of episodes: 21 (longer version); 42 (shorter version)

Production
- Running time: 52 minutes (longer version); 26 minutes (shorter version)

Original release
- Network: ČT1
- Release: September 7, 1998 – June 13, 2005

Ranč U Zelené sedmy (English: Ranch at the seventh green) is a Czech family comedy series broadcast by Czech Television. It was created by Ivo Pelant and Eva Pelantová. After its premiere in 1998, it was a success with the audience. The first season of the series was filmed by Czech Television in co-production with Ateliéry Zlín. Other two seasons were produced only by Czech Television in 2000 and 2005. The series was also published as a book, with accompanying drawings by Honza Vyčítal.

The series has two versions, which do not differ in content - a version with short parts (42 parts of an average of 26 minutes) and a version with long parts (21 parts of an average of 52 minutes). Long parts were created by making pairs of short parts one after the other. When the series premiered between 1998 and 2005, It was broadcast in a version with long episodes. The version with short episodes was presented for the first time in 2006.

== Plot ==
The Kudrna family lives in a housing estate in Prague's Vysočany. One day, the notary informs them that they have inherited a farm from their uncle Hubert, whom they have never heard of. They go there for the weekend, then they leave the children there with their grandmother on vacation before moving in there.

== Cast ==
- Miroslav Noga as Vojtěch Kudrna, father
- Milena Steinmasslová as Eliška Kudrnová, mother
- Marián Beník as Štěpán Kudrna, older son and narrator of series
- Jakub Zedníček as Matěj Kudrna, younger son
- Ivana Škarková as Eliška Kudrnová, daughter and oldest of siblings
- Jana Štěpánková as Eliška Jeřábková, grandmother
- Lubomír Kostelka as Alois Jeřábek, Eliška's boyfriend and eventual husband
- Patricie Pagáčová as Anička Studničková, Matěj's childhood friend who becomes his girlfriend
