= Litohoř =

- Municipality
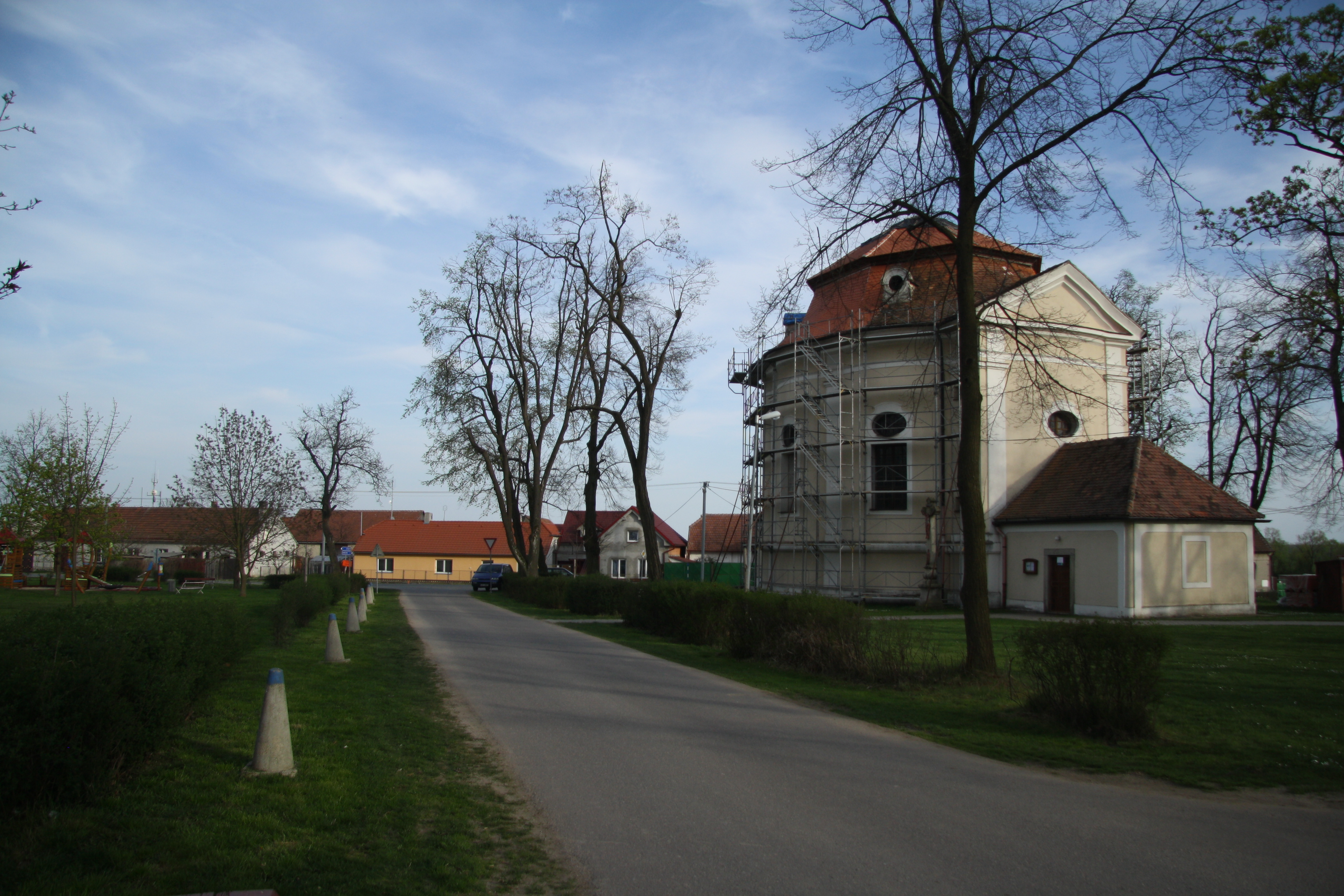
- Centre with Church of Saint John of Nepomuk

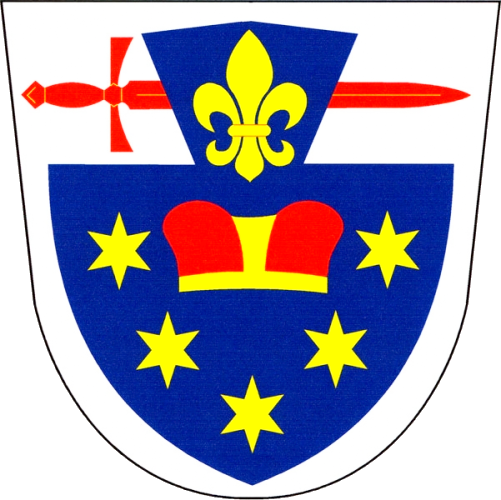
- Flag Coat of arms

- Location in the Czech Republic
- Coordinates: 49°4′0″N 15°46′6″E
- Country: Czech Republic
- Region: Vysočina
- District: Třebíč
- First mentioned: 1190

Area
  - Total: 7.50 km^{2} (2.90 sq mi)
- Elevation: 464 m (1,522 ft)

Population (2026-01-01)
  - Total: 556
  - Density: 74.1/km^{2} (192/sq mi)
- Time zone: UTC+1 (CET)
  - Summer (DST): UTC+2 (CEST)
- Postal code: 675 46
- Website: www.litohor.cz

Litohoř is a municipality and village in Třebíč District in the Vysočina Region of the Czech Republic. It has about 600 inhabitants.

Litohoř lies approximately 19 kilometres (12 mi) south-west of Třebíč, 39 km (24 mi) south of Jihlava, and 150 km (93 mi) south-east of Prague.

== Demographics ==
Historical population
Year	Pop.	±%
1869	629	—
1880	623	−1.0%
1890	609	−2.2%
1900	631	+3.6%
1910	618	−2.1%
1921	569	−7.9%
1930	619	+8.8%
1950	521	−15.8%
1961	596	+14.4%
1970	515	−13.6%
1980	499	−3.1%
1991	504	+1.0%
2001	479	−5.0%
2011	580	+21.1%
2021	531	−8.4%
Source: Censuses
