= Dominika Stará =

Slovak pop singer (born 1993)

- Born: Dominika Stará; 13 August 1993 (age 33); Šamorín, Slovakia
- Genres: Pop, rock, chanson
- Occupation: Singer
- Instruments: Vocals, piano
- Years active: 2009–present
- Spouse: Michal Jurena
- Website: www.dominikastara.sk

Dominika Jurena (née Stará; born 13 August 1993) is a Slovak pop singer who competed in the first season of the Česko Slovenská Superstar (Czech-Slovak Superstar), where she finished third, the most successful female participant in the competition.

Jurena was born in Šamorín on 13 August 1993. She has two brothers.

== Personal life ==
Stará married Michal Jurena in 2021. They have two children. She continues using her maiden name in her musical career.
