= Thomas Puskailer =

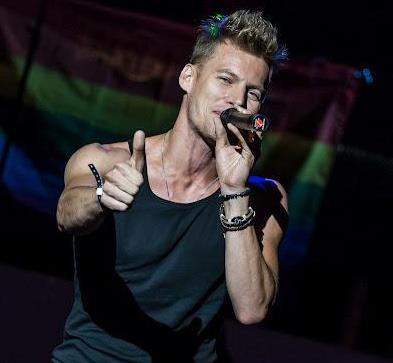
- Thomas Puskailer performing in Prague

Background information
- Born: Thomas Jan Benjamin Puskailer; March 2, 1981 (age 45); Lichtenvoorde, Netherlands
- Origin: Tegelen, Netherlands; Slovakia
- Genres: Pop, Dance, Progressive House
- Occupations: Singer, songwriter, actor, dancer, musician, model
- Instruments: Vocals, guitar
- Years active: 2001–present
- Labels: Championship Music, TP Productions
- Website: www.thomaspuskailer.com www.ecotour.sk

Thomas Jan Benjamin Puskailer (born March 2, 1981) known as Thomas Puskailer is a Dutch-born Slovak singer, songwriter and stage actor. He grew up in the Netherlands and performed across Europe and abroad in musicals, concerts, television shows and series.

Puskailer became prominent after appearing on the first season of Czech & Slovak Superstar. Although he was a finalist, Puskailer launched a music career with the release of his studio début album Make Believe in (2012) after signing with the label Championship Music in Prague. Puskailer took also executive producer credit and was a principal writer on this album. Thomas has established a fanbase in Central Europe.

== Early life ==
Thomas Puskailer was born in Lichtenvoorde on March 2, 1981, to Dutch Gabriela Katarina Puskailer, dentist and Slovak photographer Bohumil Jan Puskailer. In 1968 his parents emigrated from Slovakia to Canada where his sister Michaela and brother Patrick were born. in 1975 they moved to the Netherlands where his brother Alan and Philip were born. The family grew up on the border of Germany, meaning he learnt several languages, including Dutch, German, English and Slovak from a very young age. Thomas is the youngest of five. As he grew up, he started to sing in church choirs and attended classes in piano, drums, guitar, saxophone, dance and singing.

Puskailer went to school in Germany and became heavily involved with the amateur music and theater productions, and performed main parts in many school musicals. He then went on to train professionally at the "Lucia Marthas Dance Academy", for three years in Amsterdam. During his studies he worked as a backing dancer and singer for many pop groups and also acted in the well known soap opera "Onderweg Naar Morgen" he took on the role of Vladimir Valikov. During this period various modeling agencies also discovered him and he became the face of several campaigns. He became in 2011 the face of the toothbrush Soladey Eco as he is a known supporter of environmental living.

== Career ==
=== 2011: Maxi single ===
Prior to the début album, "Make Believe", being released, Puskailer released a "Maxi single" in December 2011, consisting of three songs "Sitting on a Cloud", "By your Side" and "Life is Good". The first two tracks, "Sitting on a Cloud" and "By Your Side" are co-written with UK based producer Joe Dworniak in Riverfish Studios. The third track, "Life is Good", was written and composed by Puskailer. The songs were finished and mastered in the production studios "Creative Music House" in Slovakia.

Two singles of the "Maxi Single" have been officially released. The first to be heard 'on air', was "Sitting on a Cloud", which premiered on Fun Radio in Slovakia on August 4, 2012. The second single "By your Side" came next, accompanied with a full music video, On March 3, 2012. All 3 songs are included in the debut album "Make Believe".

=== 2012: Make Believe ===
Make Believe was the début solo album which incorporated elements of pop, dance & club genres and collaborated with a wide range of urban producers. The songs "Make Believe" and "Artificial Light" are written by Grammy award-winning New York producer Bill Grainer. "Sitting on a Cloud", "By your Side", "Cappuccino" and "Moneytree (Miroslav Vrlik Remix)" are co-written with UK based producer Joe Dworniak. The final tracks were produced in the recordings studios "Creative Music House" in Bratislava, Slovak Republic.

On August 2, 2012, Puskailer released his single "Moneytree (Miroslav Vrlik Remix)" from his début album and it reached No. 1 on See Jay Radio Dance Charts for seven weeks.

=== 2012: ECO TOUR (Environmental Education Show) ===
Thomas also toured through the whole of Slovakia with ECO TOUR an ecological entertainment experience of his creation. The ECO TOUR show is an educational theatre show for young children and teenagers incorporating music, games, interaction and ecological messages.

== Discography ==
=== Albums ===
Year	Title	Album details
2011	Thomas Puskailer Maxi Single	Released: December 8, 2011; Label: Propagandahouse; Formats: CD (for promotional use only)
2012	Make Believe	Released:November 15, 2012; Label: Championship Music; Formats: Digital download, CD

=== Singles ===
Year	Title	Published	Album
2010	"Always on the Road”	September 11, 2010	Make Believe
2011	"Sitting on a Cloud”	August 4, 2011	Make Believe
2012	"By Your Side“	March 3, 2012	Make Believe
2012	"Moneytree (Miroslav Vrlik Remix)"	August 8, 2012	Make Believe
2012	"Make Believe“	November 29, 2012	Make Believe
2013	"Som Tvoj" featuring Eva Mazikova	July 1, 2013	single
2013	"What About Christmas”	23 Oktober 2013	single
2014	"Don't Let Go"	February 6, 2014	single
2014	"I Feel Good" featuring Mária Čírová	official single release tba	single
2014	"Make This Paradise”	April 29, 2014	single
2014	"Don’t Let Go (Charlie Clubber Remix)”	April 29, 2014	single
2014	"Have It All Tonight”	June 24, 2014	single
2014	"Dance With Me (Hey Pretty Lady)”	July 29, 2014	single
2014	"Make This Paradise (Soundlab Remix)”	September 2, 2014	single

=== Music videos ===
Year	Title	Director
2012	"By Your Side"	Martin Hudák
2012	"Moneytree"	Celso Destefano
2013	"Make Believe"	Tomáš Mojzeš
2013	"What About Christmas"	Celso Destefano
2014	"Don't Let Go"	Richard Raiman
2014	"Dance With Me (Hey Pretty Lady)"	Lukáš Tobola

== Concert Tours ==
- 2012: Eco Tour
