= SuperStar (Czech and Slovak TV series) =

Czech-Slovak music competition television series

- Also known as: Česko Slovenská SuperStar
- Created by: Simon Fuller
- Countries of origin: Czech Republic; Slovakia

Original release
- Network: TV Nova; Markíza
- Release: September 6, 2009 – present

SuperStar (previously known as Česko Slovenská SuperStar) is a joint Czech-Slovak version Česko hledá SuperStar and SuperStar Search Slovakia based on the Idol franchise. Three seasons of this competition were broadcast separately in the Czech Republic and Slovakia, but in 2009, they were merged to reduce costs and increase attractiveness for viewers.

The first season premiered in September 2009 with castings held in Prague, Brno, Bratislava, and Košice. It aired on two channels, TV Nova (Czech Republic) and Markíza (Slovakia), which have also been the broadcast stations for the individual seasons.

Determining to legitimate a fair chance for each country's contestants to reach the final, twelve contestants split into genders and nationalities in the semifinals, assuming a 50% share for each country in the top 12.

== Format ==
In Season 1, the age limit was set from 15 to 30 years old. However, 14-year-old contestants could apply, but there was a condition that they had to be 15 years old at the time of the final. Successful contestants from the theater come to hear their verdict whether they would advance to the semi-finals or not. When audience decided between them via text message, they jury decided to use a wild card. The wild card was first introduced and used in the second season, when the jury used it to save Martin Harich in one of the final rounds.

The winner of the series receives the title of SuperStar, a check worth 100,000 euros and the opportunity to release their album.

== Cast ==
Judges and host of the upcoming season of SuperStar

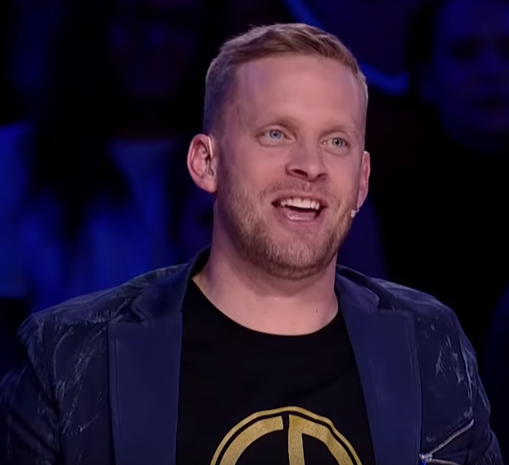
Jakub Prachař

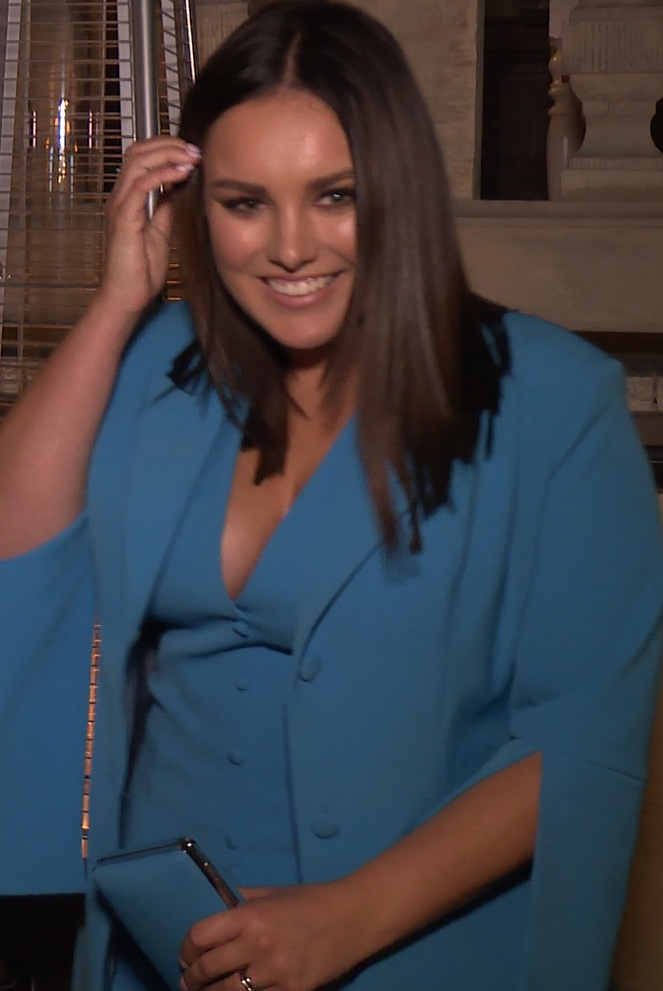
Ewa Farna

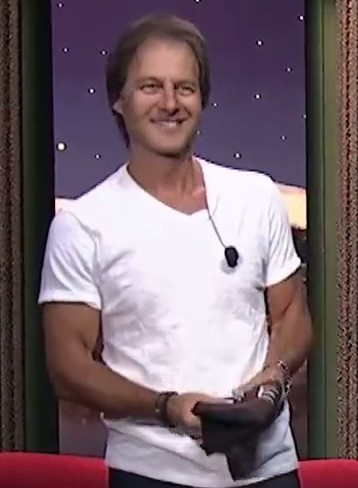
Pavol Habera

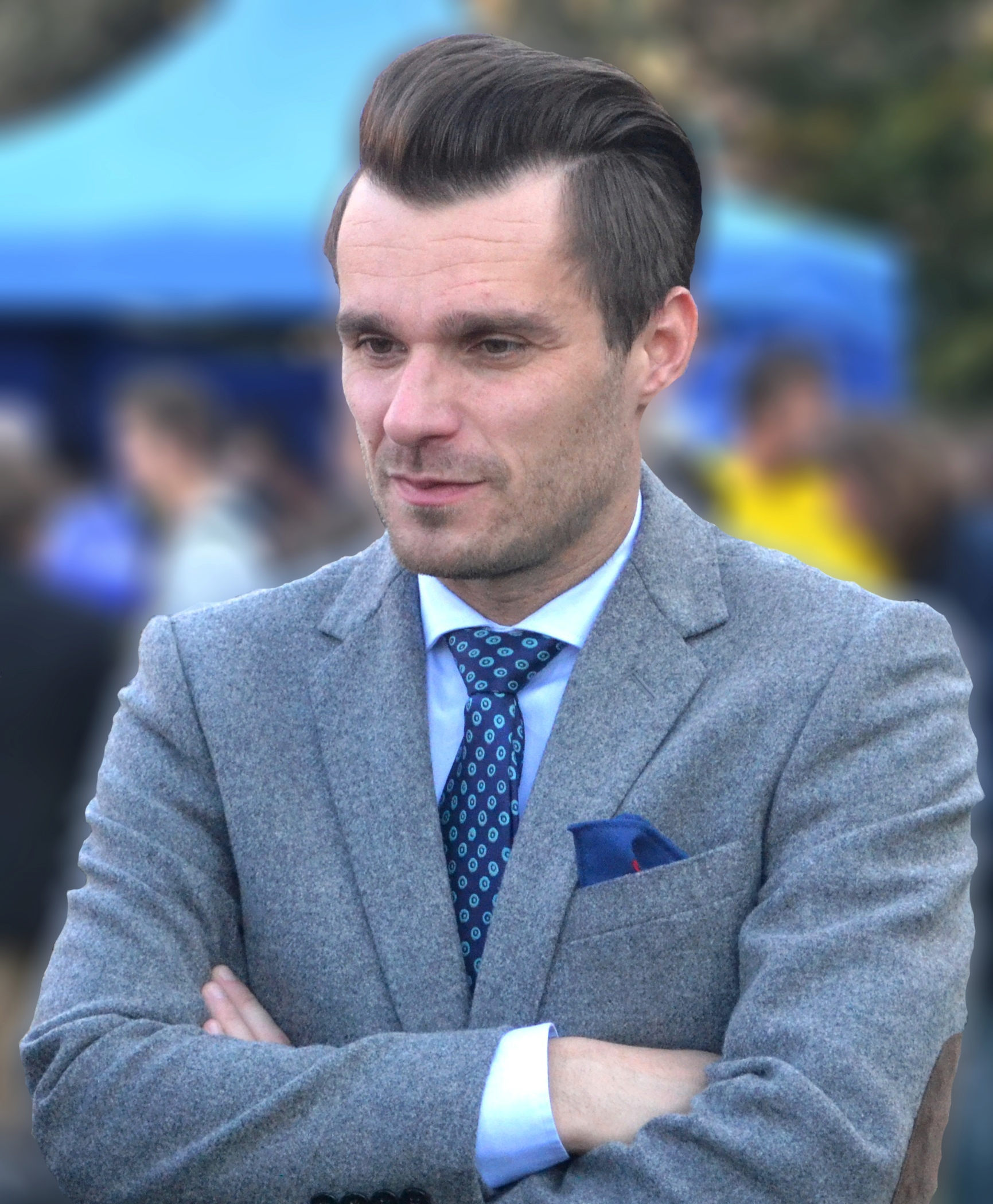
Leoš Mareš

=== Hosts ===
The first season of SuperStar was hosted by Leoš Mareš and Adela Banášová, who had both hosted their respective regional versions. With the arrival of the second season, a new hosting duo came from the Czech Republic, Leoš Mareš again and Slovak singer Tina, for whom hosting SuperStar was her first time in the hosting industry. Banášová refused to host.

The biggest change was the third season, where the hosting duo was completely replaced. "We are trying to move the third season of SuperStar forward. There have been a lot of talent competitions in recent years, so it's only right to come up with something new. So we have changed the hosts and partly the jury", said creative producer and director Pepe Majeský about the changes. Therefore, Zora Kepková from Snídaně s Novau by TV Nova and Roman Juraško from Telerán by Markíza became the presenters of the third season. However, Tina did not accept the offer due to her pregnancy. Before TV Nova and Markíza made an official statement about who would host the third season, Tereza Pergnerová was also considered. After a few months, the new season of SuperStar was hosted by Martin Rausch, who appeared in Česko Slovensko má talent on Prima Televize and TV JOJ.

In July 2015, Czech website Super.cz reportedly decided between Hejdová – who hosted the previous season – and Jitka Nováčková, with Emma Smetana being considered as well. Eventually, Rausch hosted the show alone until Nováčková joined him from beginning with the semi-finals.

Key
Host of SuperStar

Presenter	Season							
Presenter	1	2	3	4	5	6	7	8
Ewa Farna								
Leoš Mareš								
Jasmina Alagič								
Adela Banášová								
Tina								
Roman Juraško								
Zora Kepková								
Martin Rausch								
Jitka Nováčková								

=== Judges ===
Lucie Bílá was offered the position as judge at the beginning of second season.

Marta Jandová and Dara Rolins initially would not return to the jury seats, but moved to Prima Televize to serve as judges in X Factor, which was not broadcast. Later, TV Nova had a problem with the pornographic pictures that Helena Zeťová had taken in the past, so they preferred Ewa Farna, but she later rejected the offer and Zeťová eventually sat on the jury. The jury had four members in the first two seasons and three in the third season. Farna was supposed to appear in the second season but left the series again.

In the fourth season, Habera did not plan to appear as a judge again. Rolins was also expected to return but rejected the offer.

Key

Judges of SuperStar

Judge	Season							
Judge	1	2	3	4	5	6	7	8
Pavol Habera								
Leoš Mareš								
Monika Bagárová								
Patricie Pagáčová								
Marián Čekovský								
Matěj Ruppert								
Ben Cristovao								
Katarína Knechtová								
Marta Jandová								
Dara Rolins								
Ondřej Hejma								
Rytmus								
Gabriela Osvaldová								
Helena Zeťová								
Ewa Farna								
Ondřej Soukup								
Klára Vytisková								
Calin								
Jakub Prachař								

== Series overview ==
Color key

Female contestant
Male contestant

Season	Premiere	Finale	No. of finalists	No. of final weeks	Winner		Runner-up		Judges				
1	September 6, 2009	December 20, 2009	12	9		Martin Chodúr		Miroslav Šmajda	Pavol Habera	Dara Rolins	Marta Jandová	Ondřej Hejma	
2	February 20, 2011	June 5, 2011	12	9		Lukáš Adamec		Gabriela Gunčíková	Pavol Habera	Gabriela Osvaldová	Helena Zeťová	Rytmus	
3	February 10, 2013	June 2, 2013	12	11		Sabina Křováková		Štefan Pčelár	Pavol Habera	Ewa Farna	Ondřej Soukup		
4	August 30, 2015	December 6, 2015	8	6		Emma Drobná		Štěpán Urban	Pavol Habera	Klára Vytisková	Ondřej Soukup	Marta Jandová	
5	February 24, 2018	June 10, 2018	10	5		Tereza Mašková		Eliška Rusková	Pavol Habera	Katarína Knechtová	Ben Cristovao	Matěj Ruppert	
6	February 16, 2020	May 31, 2020	10	2		Barbora Piešová		Diana Kovaľová	Pavol Habera	Monika Bagárová	Marián Čekovský	Patricie Pagáčová	Leoš Mareš
7	September 3, 2021	December 19, 2021	10	4		Adam Pavlovčin		Elizabeth Kopecká	Pavol Habera	Monika Bagárová	Marián Čekovský	Patricie Pagáčová	Leoš Mareš
8	Autumn 2026	TBA	TBA	TBA	TBA	TBA	TBA	TBA	Pavol Habera	Ewa Farna	Calin	Jakub Prachař	

== Receptions ==
=== Ratings ===
Season	Premiered				Ended				Timeslot (CET)
Season	Date	Czech Republic Viewers (in millions)	Slovakia Viewers (in millions)	Viewers (in millions)	Date	Czech Republic Viewers (in millions)	Slovakia Viewers (in millions)	Viewers (in millions)	Timeslot (CET)
1	September 6, 2009	1.6	0.94	2.5	December 20, 2009	2.54	1.35	3.89	Saturday 8:00 pm (semifinals); Sunday 8:00 pm (performances); Monday 8:00 pm (results)
2	February 20, 2011	0.93	0.89	1.82	June 5, 2011	1.47	0.96	2.43	Saturday 8:00 pm (semifinals); Sunday 8:00 pm (performances); Monday 8:00 pm (results)
3	February 10, 2013	1.00	0.86	1.86	June 2, 2013	0.86	0.64	1.5	Sunday 8:20 pm
4	August 30, 2015	0.76	0.5	1.26	December 6, 2015	0.88	0.6	1.48	Sunday 8:30 pm
5	February 24, 2018 (Czech Republic); February 25, 2018 (Slovakia)	0.77	0.43	1.2	June 10, 2018	0.83	0.49	1.32	Sunday 8:30 pm (finals)
6	February 16, 2020	0.75	0.47	1.22	May 31, 2020	1.02	0.68	1.7	Sunday 8:30 pm
7	September 3, 2021 (Slovakia); September 4, 2021 (Czech Republic)	0.57	0.39	0.96	December 19, 2021	0.69	0.45	1.14	Sunday 8:30 pm (finals)
8	September 2, 2026	0.59	0.30	0.89	December, 2026	TBA	TBA	TBA	Wednesday 8:30 pm

== See also ==
- Česko Slovenská SuperStar: Výběr finálových hitů
- X Factor (Czech Republic)
- The 100 Greatest Slovak Albums of All Time
