= Markéta Konvičková =

Czech Český slavík-winning singer (born 1994)

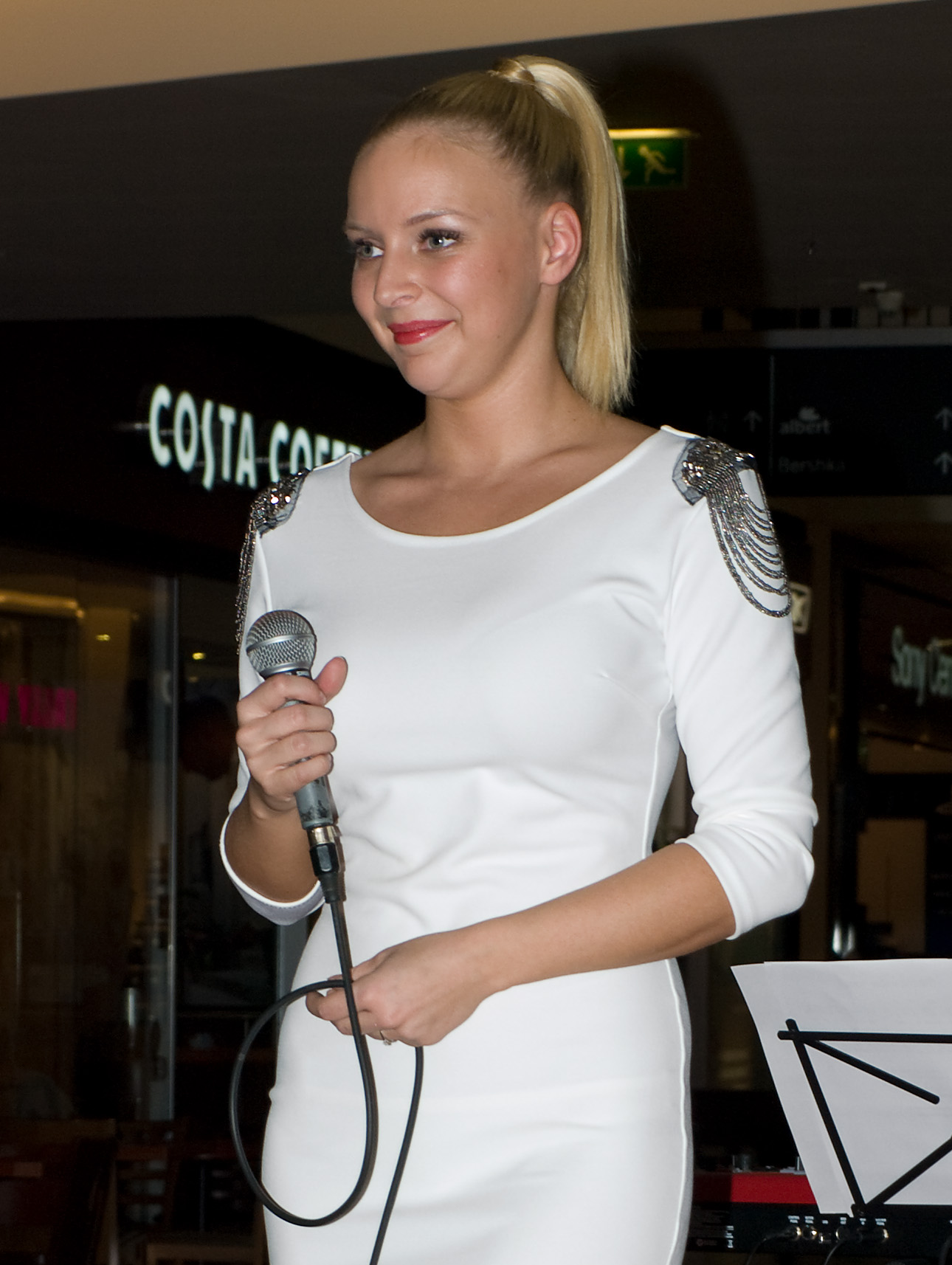
- Konvičková in December 2015

Background information
- Born: Markéta Konvičková; 17 May 1994 (age 32); Třinec, Czech Republic
- Genres: Pop
- Occupation: Singer
- Years active: 2009–present
- Label: EMI Czech Republic
- Website: marketakonvickova.com

Markéta Konvičková (born 17 May 1994) is a Czech Český slavík-winning singer. She was a finalist in the first season of SuperStar and won the "New Artist" award at the 2010 Český slavík awards.

== Discography ==
=== Studio albums ===
- 2010: Na šňůře perel
- 2011: Kafe, bar a nikotin
- 2013: Tablo
- 2015: Má přání k Vánocům

=== Compilation albums ===
- 2017: Já

== Awards and nominations ==
Year	Nominated work	Award	Category	Result	Ref
2010	Herself	Český slavík	New Artist	Won	
