= Patricie Solaříková =

Czech actress (born 1988)

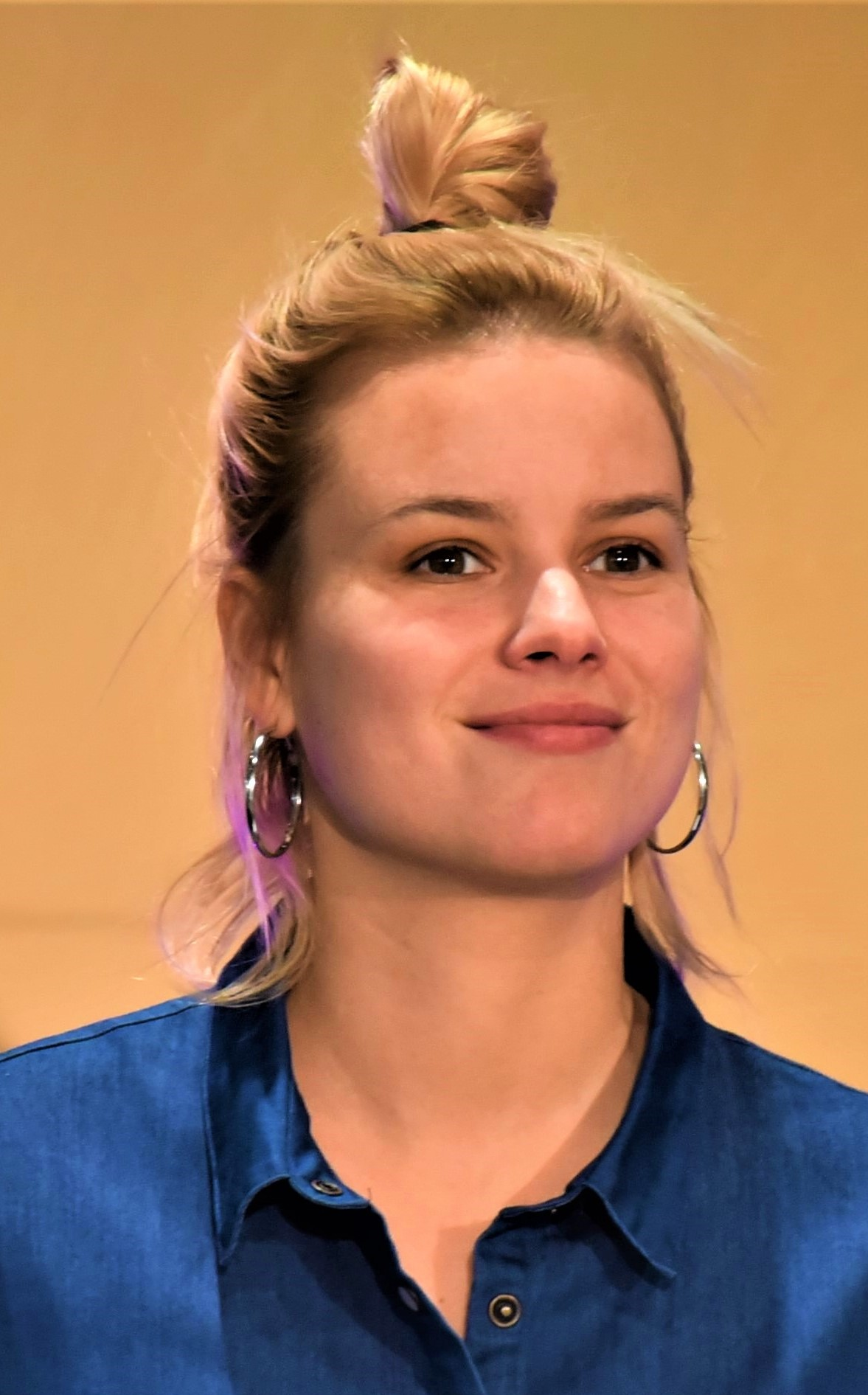
- Solaříková in 2019
- Born: Patricie Solaříková; 19 December 1988 (age 36); Prague, Czechoslovakia
- Other names: Patricie Pagáčová
- Occupation: Actress
- Years active: 2000–present
- Children: 1

Patricie Solaříková (also known as Patricie Pagáčová; born 19 December 1988) is a Czech actress. In the Czech Republic, she was known for her long-running role in the Czech soap opera Ulice from 2005 until 2019. As well as television acting, Solaříková has also had roles in a number of films, as well as taking to the stage at theatres in Prague. She appeared on seasons six and seven of Czech and Slovak television series SuperStar as one of the judges.

== Acting career ==
Solaříková appeared in the second and third series of television series Ranč U Zelené sedmy, filmed in 2000 and 2005. She then joined the long-running TV Nova soap opera Ulice at its inception in 2005, playing Tereza Jordánová. She remained on the show until announcing her departure in January 2019.

Solaříková made her theatre debut in 2017, acting at Prague's Branické divadlo in the Sébastien Thiéry production Dva nahatý chlapi (French: Deux hommes tout nus). She has also acted in Divadlo Na Jezerce in Prague's Nusle district. In November 2019, Solaříková was announced as a judge for season six of SuperStar, returning for season seven in 2021. She subsequently featured in the miniseries Iveta, based on the life of Czech icon Iveta Bartošová.

== Personal life ==
Solaříková studied at Metropolitan University Prague, graduating in 2015. In June 2019 Solaříková announced her marriage to Tibor Pagáč and changed her surname to Pagáčová. She became a mother in 2021, giving birth to a daughter in May of that year.

Solaříková has been involved in numerous charity projects, such as hosting a concert and drawing attention to events supporting ALS. She also organised an annual dog-themed calendar to support animal shelters.

== Selected filmography ==
- Ranč U Zelené sedmy (television, 2000–2005)
- Zakletá třináctka (2004)
- Ulice (television, 2005–2019)
- Svědomí Denisy Klánové (2009)
- Kluci z hor (2018)
- Gump: The Dog That Taught People How to Live (2021)
- Bet on Friendship (2021)
- Pánský klub (2022)
- Iveta (miniseries) (television, 2022)
- Nineties (TV series) (television, 2022)
