= Czech Republic in the Eurovision Song Contest 2016 =

- Eurovision Song Contest 2016
- Participating broadcaster: Czech Television (ČT)
- Country: Czech Republic
- Selection process: Internal selection
- Announcement date: Artist: 10 March 2016; Song: 11 March 2016

Competing entry
- Song: "I Stand"
- Artist: Gabriela Gunčíková
- Songwriters: Christian Schneider; Sara Biglert; Aidan O'Connor

Placement
- Semi-final result: Qualified (9th, 161 points)
- Final result: 25th, 41 points

Participation chronology

The Czech Republic was represented at the Eurovision Song Contest 2016 with the song "I Stand" written by Christian Schneider, Sara Biglert and Aidan O'Connor. The song was performed by Gabriela Gunčíková, who was internally selected by the Czech broadcaster Česká televize (ČT) to represent the nation at the 2016 contest in Stockholm, Sweden. Gunčíková and the song "I Stand" were announced as the Czech entry on 10 March 2016. The song was presented to the public on 11 March 2016.

Czech Republic was drawn to compete in the first semi-final of the Eurovision Song Contest which took place on 10 May 2016. Performing during the show in position 10, "I Stand" was announced among the top 10 entries of the first semi-final and therefore qualified to compete in the final on 14 May. This marked the first qualification to the final for the Czech Republic since they debuted in the contest in 2007. It was later revealed that Czech Republic placed ninth out of the 18 participating countries in the semi-final with 161 points. In the final, Czech Republic performed in position 2 and placed twenty-fifth out of the 26 participating countries, scoring 41 points.

== Background ==
Prior to the 2016 contest, the Czech Republic had participated in the Eurovision Song Contest four times since its first entry in 2007. The nation competed in the contest on three consecutive occasions between 2007 and 2009 without qualifying to the final: in 2007 Kabát performing "Malá dáma" placed 28th (last) in the semi-final achieving only one point, in 2008 Tereza Kerndlová performing "Have Some Fun" placed 18th (second to last) in her semi-final scoring nine points and in 2009 Gipsy.cz performing the song "Aven Romale" placed 18th (last) in their semi-final failing to score any points. The Czech broadcaster withdrew from the contest between 2010 and 2014 citing reasons such as low viewing figures and poor results for their absence. In 2015, Czech Republic returned to the contest and once again failed to qualify to the final with the song "Hope Never Dies" performed by Marta Jandová and Václav Noid Bárta.

The Czech national broadcaster, Česká televize (ČT), broadcasts the event within Czech Republic and organises the selection process for the nation's entry. The broadcaster has used both national finals and internal selections to select the Czech Eurovision entry in the past. ČT confirmed their intentions to participate at the 2016 Eurovision Song Contest in August 2015. The broadcaster later confirmed in November 2015 that the Czech entry for the 2016 contest would be selected internally.

== Before Eurovision ==
=== Internal selection ===
ČT announced in November 2015 that the Czech entry for the Eurovision Song Contest 2016 would be selected internally. Jan Bors was assigned as the Czech Head of Delegation for the Eurovision Song Contest and managed the selection process. On 11 January 2016, Bors confirmed that three songs had been shortlisted by the broadcaster and that a series of meetings would take place throughout January in order to select the entry. In addition, ČT spokesperson Alžběta Plívová announced that three entries were in contention and that a decision regarding which entry would be selected was imminent. On 13 January, Czech news portal iDNES.cz reported that the artists behind the three shortlisted entries were singers Dasha and Thom Artway as well as the band Light & Love.

On 10 March 2016, "I Stand" performed by Gabriela Gunčíková was announced by ČT as the Czech entry for the 2016 Eurovision Song Contest. Gunčíková and the song were selected by ČT together with a five-member jury consisting of music journalists Honza Dědek and Jaroslav Špulák, singer and musician Michael Kocáb, composer and producer Jan Maxián and composer and 2015 Czech Eurovision entrant Václav Noid Bárta. "I Stand", which was written by the Swedish and Irish trio Christian Schneider, Sara Biglert and Aidan O'Connor, was one of three songs shortlisted by the jury and broadcaster from over 40 proposals that the broadcaster received. The song was originally submitted to the Czech broadcaster as a proposal with Dasha as the performer; the singer had been reported earlier in January as a shortlisted artist. The song was presented to the public via the release of the official music video, directed by Uroš Trefalt, on 11 March 2016.

=== Promotion ===
In the lead up to the Eurovision Song Contest, Gabriela Gunčíková performed as part of the Rock Meets Classic concert series where she was one of the vocalists for the Mat Sinner Band, which included Primal Fear members Mat Sinner, Alex Beyrodt and Tom Naumann (guitars), Voodoo Circle's Jimmy Kresic (keyboards), Veronika Lukešová (drums) and backing vocalists Tiffany Kirkland, Kolinda Brozovic and Sascha Krebs. The tour, which took place across Germany, occurred between 30 March and 17 April. Between 22 and 23 April, Gunčíková completed promotional activities in Malta by appearing during the TVM talk show programme Xarabank and performing during the Malta Eurovision Party at the Aria Complex in San Ġwann. On 26 April, Gabriela Gunčíková performed during the Euro Party event organised by OGAE Czech Republic, which took place at the Fénix club in Zlín.

== At Eurovision ==
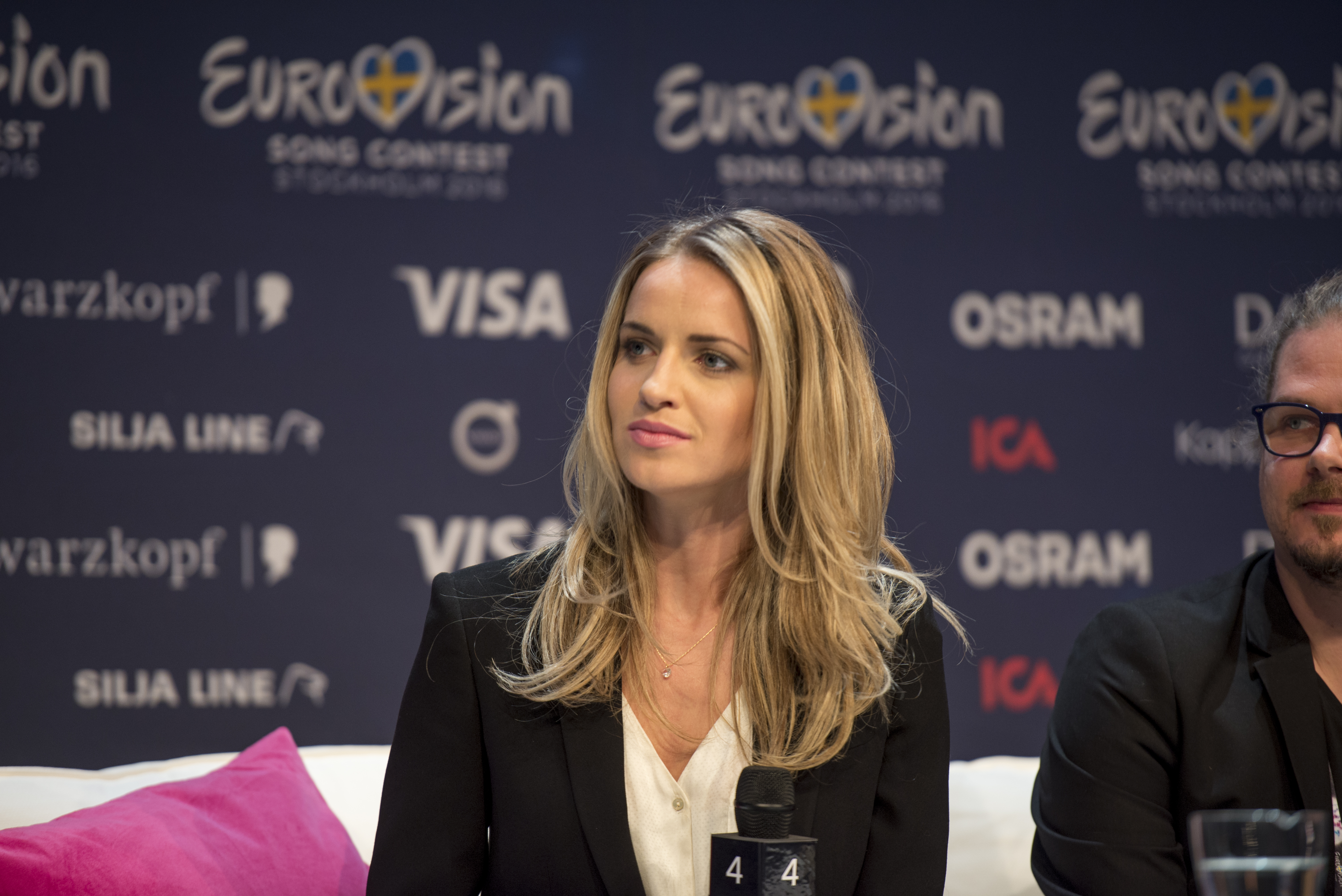
Gabriela Gunčíková during a press meet and greet

According to Eurovision rules, all nations with the exceptions of the host country and the "Big Five" (France, Germany, Italy, Spain and the United Kingdom) are required to qualify from one of two semi-finals in order to compete for the final; the top ten countries from each semi-final progress to the final. The European Broadcasting Union (EBU) split up the competing countries into six different pots based on voting patterns from previous contests, with countries with favourable voting histories put into the same pot. On 25 January 2016, a special allocation draw was held which placed each country into one of the two semi-finals, as well as which half of the show they would perform in. The Czech Republic was placed into the first semi-final, to be held on 10 May 2016, and was scheduled to perform in the second half of the show.

Once all the competing songs for the 2016 contest had been released, the running order for the semi-finals was decided by the shows' producers rather than through another draw, so that similar songs were not placed next to each other. The Czech Republic was set to perform in position 10, following the entry from Russia and before the entry from Cyprus.

In the Czech Republic, the semi-finals were broadcast on ČT2 and the final was broadcast on ČT1. All three shows featured commentary by Libor Bouček. The Czech spokesperson, who will announce the top 12-point score awarded by the Czech jury during the final, was Daniela Písařovicová.

=== Semi-final ===
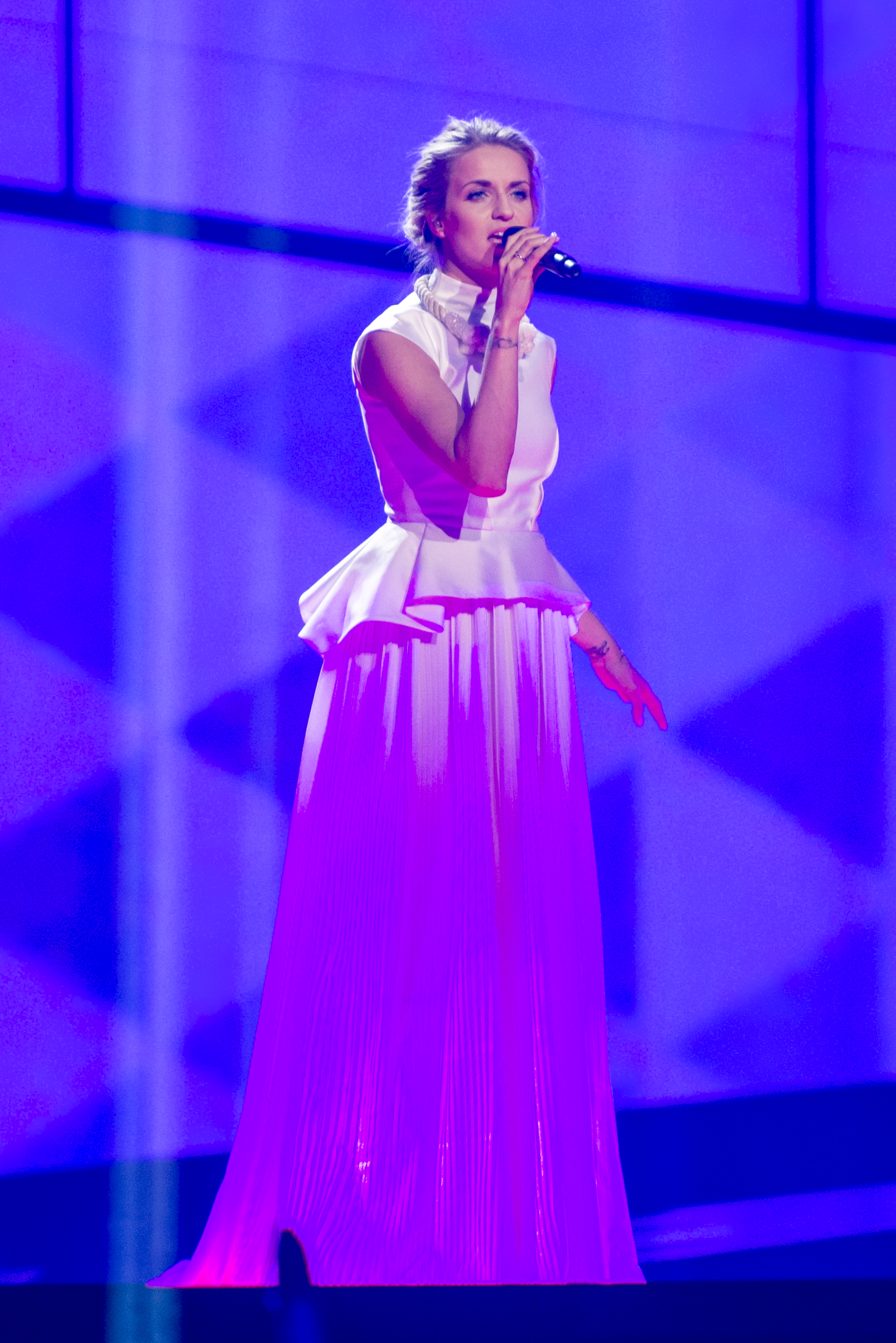
Gabriela Gunčíková during a rehearsal before the first semi-final

Gabriela Gunčíková took part in technical rehearsals on 3 and 6 May, followed by dress rehearsals on 9 and 10 May. This included the jury show on 9 May where the professional juries of each country watched and voted on the competing entries.

The Czech performance featured Gabriela Gunčíková appearing alone on stage wearing a long white dress. Gunčíková's look was developed by Blanka Hašková and her dress was designed by Pavel Ivančic. The performance began with a dark stage and a spotlight on Gunčíková which progressed to the LED screens displaying blue and pink geometric patterns and falling flowers. The performance also featured the use of a wind machine. The art director for the performance was Uroš Trefalt, who directed the music video for "I Stand", and the creative director was Jan Potměšil. Four off-stage backing vocalists performed with Gunčíková: Madeleine Jangklev, Elin Åkesson, Clara Hagman and Peter Ericson.

At the end of the show, Czech Republic was announced as having finished in the top 10 and subsequently qualifying for the grand final. This marked the first qualification to the final for the Czech Republic since they debuted in the contest in 2007. It was later revealed that the Czech Republic placed ninth in the semi-final, receiving a total of 161 points: 41 points from the televoting and 120 points from the juries.

=== Final ===
Shortly after the first semi-final, a winners' press conference was held for the ten qualifying countries. As part of this press conference, the qualifying artists took part in a draw to determine which half of the grand final they would subsequently participate in. This draw was done in the order the countries appeared in the semi-final running order. Czech Republic was drawn to compete in the first half. Following this draw, the shows' producers decided upon the running order of the final, as they had done for the semi-finals. Czech Republic was subsequently placed to perform in position 2, following the entry from Belgium and before the entry from the Netherlands.

Gabriela Gunčíková once again took part in dress rehearsals on 13 and 14 May before the final, including the jury final where the professional juries cast their final votes before the live show. Gabriela Gunčíková performed a repeat of her semi-final performance during the final on 14 May. Czech Republic placed twenty-fifth in the final, scoring 41 points: 0 points from the televoting and 41 points from the juries.

=== Voting ===
Voting during the three shows was conducted under a new system that involved each country now awarding two sets of points from 1-8, 10 and 12: one from their professional jury and the other from televoting. Each nation's jury consisted of five music industry professionals who are citizens of the country they represent, with their names published before the contest to ensure transparency. This jury judged each entry based on: vocal capacity; the stage performance; the song's composition and originality; and the overall impression by the act. In addition, no member of a national jury was permitted to be related in any way to any of the competing acts in such a way that they cannot vote impartially and independently. The individual rankings of each jury member as well as the nation's televoting results were released shortly after the grand final.

Below is a breakdown of points awarded to the Czech Republic and awarded by the Czech Republic in the first semi-final and grand final of the contest, and the breakdown of the jury voting and televoting conducted during the two shows:

==== Points awarded to the Czech Republic ====
Points awarded to the Czech Republic (Semi-final 1)
Score	Televote	Jury
12 points		Bosnia and Herzegovina; Croatia
10 points		Austria; Finland
8 points		Hungary; Iceland; Moldova
7 points	Spain	Sweden
6 points		Estonia; Spain
5 points		Armenia; Cyprus; Russia
4 points	Bosnia and Herzegovina; Croatia	Montenegro; Netherlands; San Marino
3 points	Azerbaijan; France; Greece; Hungary; Moldova	Malta
2 points	Armenia; Malta; Netherlands; San Marino	Azerbaijan
1 point	Austria; Montenegro; Russia	France

Points awarded to the Czech Republic (Final)
Score	Televote	Jury
12 points		
10 points		Croatia
8 points		
7 points		
6 points		Bosnia and Herzegovina
5 points		Iceland
4 points		Austria; Poland
3 points		Sweden; Finland
2 points		Hungary; Ireland
1 point		Armenia; Belgium

==== Points awarded by the Czech Republic ====
Points awarded by the Czech Republic (Semi-final 1)
Score	Televote	Jury
12 points	Armenia	Hungary
10 points	Azerbaijan	Netherlands
8 points	Russia	Malta
7 points	Bosnia and Herzegovina	Finland
6 points	Hungary	Croatia
5 points	Austria	Austria
4 points	Cyprus	Iceland
3 points	Netherlands	Azerbaijan
2 points	Croatia	Bosnia and Herzegovina
1 point	Malta	Cyprus

Points awarded by the Czech Republic (Final)
Score	Televote	Jury
12 points	Ukraine	Sweden
10 points	Russia	Hungary
8 points	Armenia	Croatia
7 points	Poland	Netherlands
6 points	Azerbaijan	Malta
5 points	Bulgaria	France
4 points	Austria	United Kingdom
3 points	Hungary	Lithuania
2 points	Sweden	Belgium
1 point	Australia	Latvia

==== Detailed voting results ====
The following members comprised the Czech jury:

- Miloš Skalka (jury chairperson) – radio presenter, DJ, music journalist
- Pavel Anděl – editor, producer, presenter
- Marcela Kočandrlová – artist manager of Warner Music Czech Republic
- Petr Král – radio presenter, music editor
- Markéta Nešlehová – film director

Detailed voting results from the Czech Republic (Semi-final 1)
R/O	Country	Jury							Televote	
R/O	Country	M. Skalka	P. Anděl	M. Kočandrlová	P. Král	M. Nešlehová	Rank	Points	Rank	Points
01	Finland	5	5	12	1	4	4	7	17	
02	Greece	12	13	15	16	16	17		15	
03	Moldova	17	11	10	13	8	11		14	
04	Hungary	1	1	1	2	1	1	12	5	6
05	Croatia	6	4	7	5	7	5	6	9	2
06	Netherlands	2	2	2	3	2	2	10	8	3
07	Armenia	16	12	11	12	10	12		1	12
08	San Marino	7	14	16	9	17	13		13	
09	Russia	15	17	6	14	11	14		3	8
10	Czech Republic									
11	Cyprus	3	16	13	15	5	10	1	7	4
12	Austria	8	8	5	4	6	6	5	6	5
13	Estonia	13	10	9	17	15	15		12	
14	Azerbaijan	9	9	8	11	9	8	3	2	10
15	Montenegro	14	15	17	10	13	16		16	
16	Iceland	4	6	3	8	12	7	4	11	
17	Bosnia and Herzegovina	10	7	14	7	14	9	2	4	7
18	Malta	11	3	4	6	3	3	8	10	1

Detailed voting results from the Czech Republic (Final)
R/O	Country	Jury							Televote	
R/O	Country	M. Skalka	P. Anděl	M. Kočandrlová	P. Král	M. Nešlehová	Rank	Points	Rank	Points
01	Belgium	13	8	6	12	14	9	2	20	
02	Czech Republic									
03	Netherlands	2	6	3	7	6	4	7	18	
04	Azerbaijan	20	12	12	17	16	17		5	6
05	Hungary	4	2	2	6	2	2	10	8	3
06	Italy	9	20	19	8	18	16		22	
07	Israel	14	23	17	23	23	21		16	
08	Bulgaria	21	7	18	11	11	14		6	5
09	Sweden	1	1	1	1	1	1	12	9	2
10	Germany	24	22	23	16	20	22		19	
11	France	7	13	4	5	4	6	5	11	
12	Poland	23	21	21	22	22	23		4	7
13	Australia	3	10	10	15	17	11		10	1
14	Cyprus	22	18	25	18	9	19		12	
15	Serbia	25	19	16	19	21	20		13	
16	Lithuania	8	14	9	10	8	8	3	15	
17	Croatia	5	3	8	2	3	3	8	25	
18	Russia	18	25	24	25	25	25		2	10
19	Spain	10	17	15	20	10	15		17	
20	Latvia	11	11	11	14	7	10	1	14	
21	Ukraine	19	24	22	24	24	24		1	12
22	Malta	12	4	7	4	5	5	6	24	
23	Georgia	6	9	20	13	15	13		21	
24	Austria	16	16	5	9	12	12		7	4
25	United Kingdom	15	5	13	3	13	7	4	23	
26	Armenia	17	15	14	21	19	18		3	8
