= Czech Republic in the Eurovision Song Contest 2015 =

- Eurovision Song Contest 2015
- Participating broadcaster: Czech Television (ČT)
- Country: Czech Republic
- Selection process: Internal selection
- Announcement date: Artist: 31 January 2015; Song: 10 March 2015

Competing entry
- Song: "Hope Never Dies"
- Artist: Marta Jandová and Václav Noid Bárta
- Songwriters: Václav Noid Bárta; Tereza Šoralová

Placement
- Semi-final result: Failed to qualify (13th)

Participation chronology

The Czech Republic was represented at the Eurovision Song Contest 2015 with the song "Hope Never Dies" written by Václav Noid Bárta and Tereza Šoralová. The song was performed by Marta Jandová and Václav Noid Bárta, who were internally selected by the Czech broadcaster Česká televize (ČT) to represent the nation at the 2015 contest in Vienna, Austria. The Czech broadcaster Česká televize (ČT) announced in November 2014 that it would be returning the Eurovision Song Contest after a five-year absence. Jandová and Bárta and the song "Hope Never Dies" were announced as the Czech entry on 31 January 2015. The song was presented to the public on 10 March 2015.

The Czech Republic was drawn to compete in the second semi-final of the Eurovision Song Contest which took place on 21 May 2015. Performing during the show in position 8, "Hope Never Dies" was not announced among the top 10 entries of the second semi-final and therefore did not qualify to compete in the final. It was later revealed that the Czech Republic placed thirteenth out of the 17 participating countries in the semi-final with 33 points.

== Background ==
Prior to the 2015 contest, the Czech Republic had participated in the Eurovision Song Contest three times since its first entry in 2007. The nation competed in the contest on three consecutive occasions between 2007 and 2009 without qualifying to the final: in 2007 Kabát performing "Malá dáma" placed 28th (last) in the semi-final achieving only one point, in 2008 Tereza Kerndlová performing "Have Some Fun" placed 18th (second to last) in her semi-final scoring nine points and in 2009 Gipsy.cz performing the song "Aven Romale" placed 18th (last) in their semi-final failing to score any points. The Czech broadcaster withdrew from the contest starting from 2010 citing reasons such as low viewing figures and poor results for their absence.

The Czech national broadcaster, Česká televize (ČT), broadcasts the event within the Czech Republic and organises the selection process for the nation's entry. The broadcaster has used both national finals and internal selections to select the Czech Eurovision entry in the past. Despite initially confirming that they had no intentions of participating at the 2015 Eurovision Song Contest, the European Broadcasting Union (EBU) announced on 19 November 2014 that the Czech Republic would be returning to the contest with ČT also confirming that the Czech entry for the 2015 contest would be selected internally.

== Before Eurovision ==
=== Internal selection ===
ČT announced in November 2014 that the Czech entry for the Eurovision Song Contest 2015 would be selected internally. Ondřej Soukup was assigned to compose and create potential songs while also taking into consideration songs written by his collaborators and other well-known songwriters. On 10 March 2015, "Hope Never Dies" performed by Marta Jandová and Václav Noid Bárta was announced by ČT as the Czech entry for the 2015 Eurovision Song Contest. Jandová and Bárta as well as the song were selected by ČT together with a five-member jury consisting of music journalist Honza Dědek, talent scout Martin Červinka, editor at Czech Radio Jitka Benešová, musician Michal Hrůza, and singer and musician Michael Kocáb. "Hope Never Dies", which was written by Václav Noid Bárta himself together with Tereza Šoralová, was one of three songs shortlisted by the broadcaster from 29 proposals that Ondřej Soukup submitted in December 2014. The song was presented to the public via the release of the official music video, directed by Biser Arichtev, on 10 March 2015.

The songs we were choosing from were quite on par with each other in my opinion. However, the winning song "Hope Never Dies" was a candidate of mine too. It sports a peculiar and nice chorus, along with some nice and surprising modulation. And when I heard it, I figured that this song can really impress if done well

— Michael Kocáb

=== Promotion ===
Marta Jandová and Václav Noid Bárta specifically promoted "Hope Never Dies" as the Czech Eurovision entry on 26 April 2015 by performing during the London Eurovision Party, which was held at the Café de Paris venue in London, United Kingdom and hosted by Nicki French and Paddy O'Connell.

== At Eurovision ==
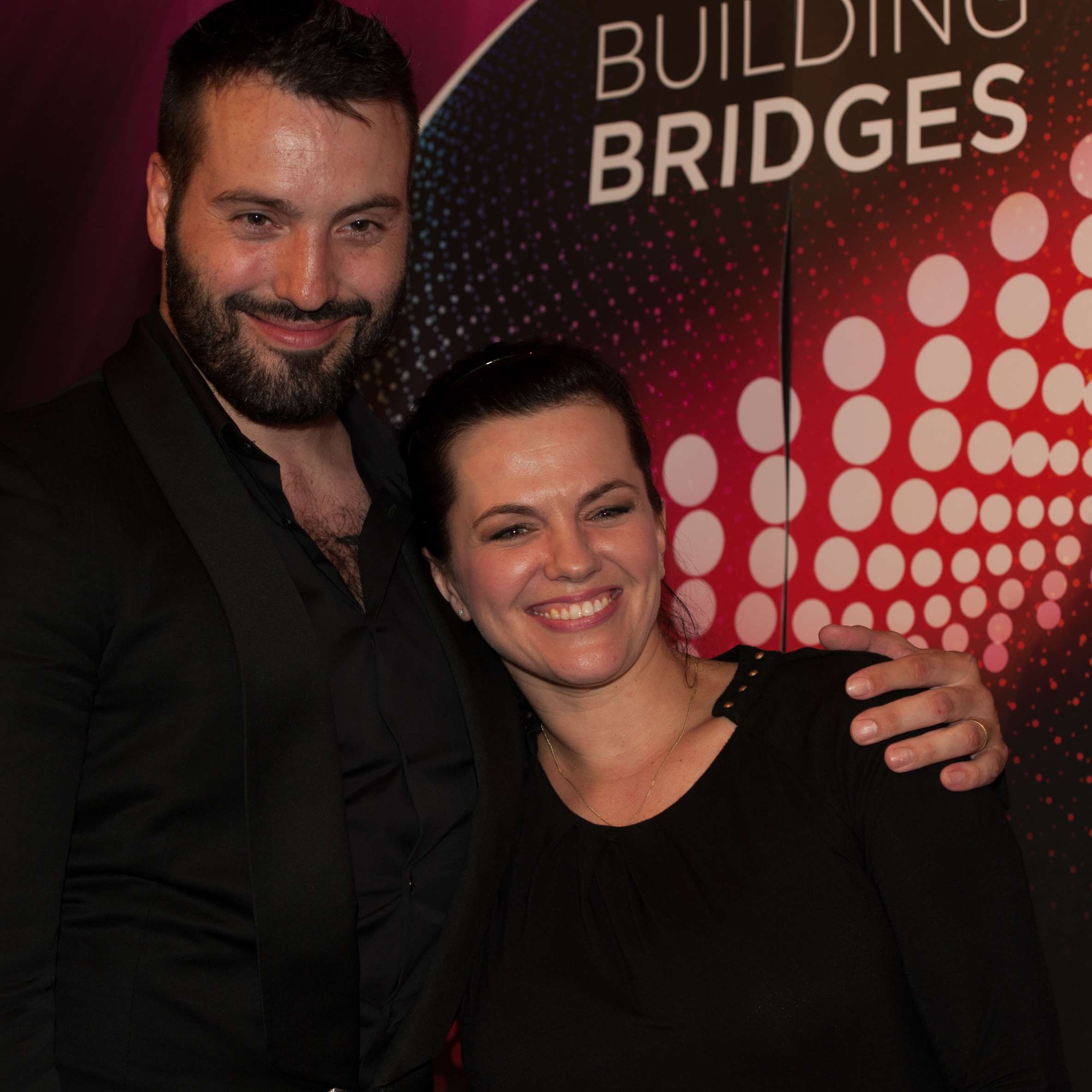
Václav Noid Bárta and Marta Jandová during a press meet-and-greet

According to Eurovision rules, all nations with the exceptions of the host country and the "Big Five" (France, Germany, Italy, Spain and the United Kingdom) are required to qualify from one of two semi-finals in order to compete for the final; the top ten countries from each semi-final progress to the final. In the 2015 contest, Australia also competed directly in the final as an invited guest nation. The European Broadcasting Union (EBU) split up the competing countries into five different pots based on voting patterns from previous contests, with countries with favourable voting histories put into the same pot. On 26 January 2015, a special allocation draw was held which placed each country into one of the two semi-finals, as well as which half of the show they would perform in. The Czech Republic was placed into the second semi-final, to be held on 21 May 2015, and was scheduled to perform in the first half of the show.

Once all the competing songs for the 2015 contest had been released, the running order for the semi-finals was decided by the shows' producers rather than through another draw, so that similar songs were not placed next to each other. The Czech Republic was set to perform in position 8, following the entry from Portugal and before the entry from Israel.

In the Czech Republic, the semi-finals were broadcast on ČT art and the final was broadcast on ČT1. All three shows featured commentary by Aleš Háma. The Czech spokesperson, who announced the Czech votes during the final, was Daniela Písařovicová.

=== Semi-final ===
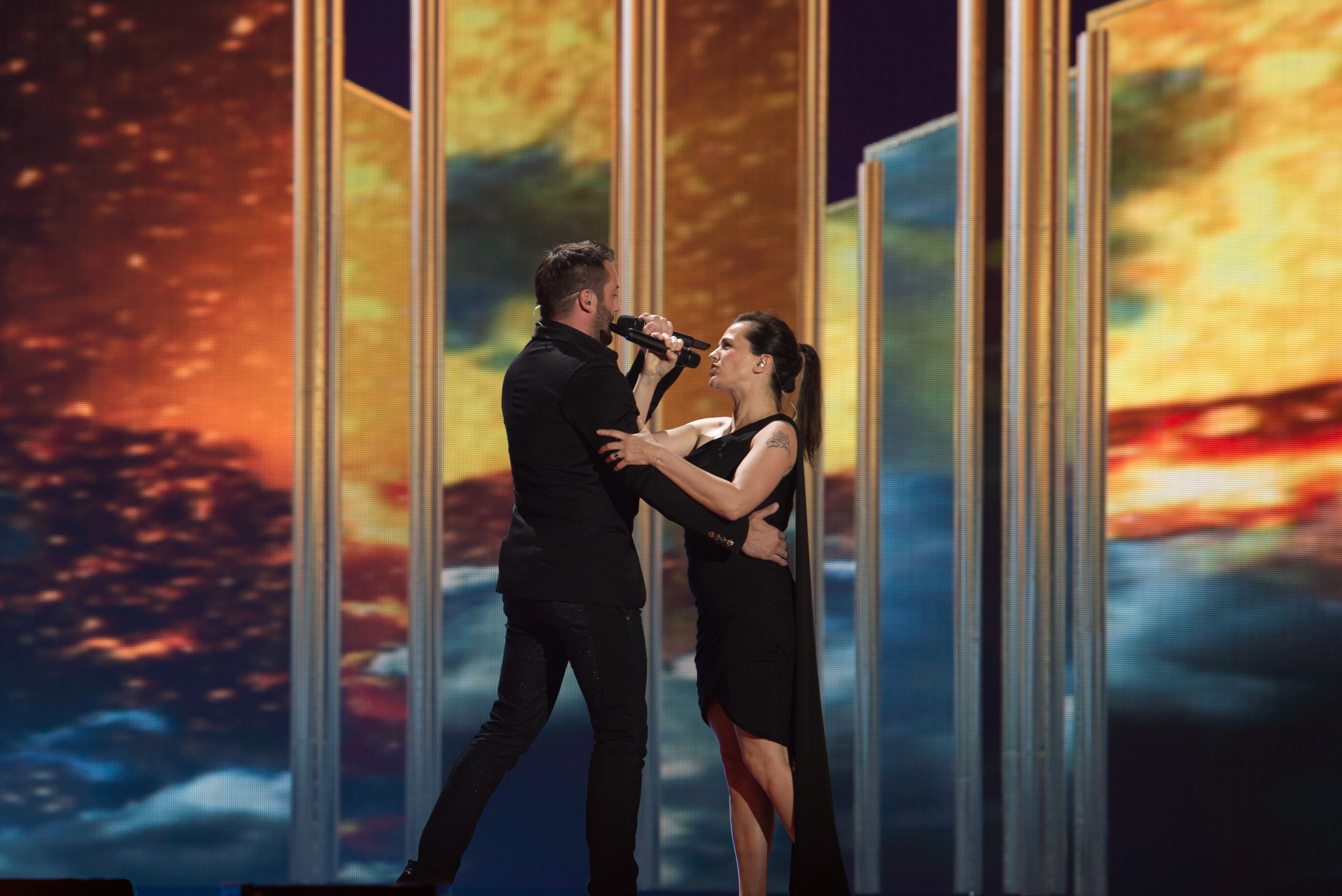
Marta Jandová and Václav Noid Bárta during a rehearsal before the second semi-final

Marta Jandová and Václav Noid Bárta took part in technical rehearsals on 13 and 16 May, followed by dress rehearsals on 20 and 21 May. This included the jury show on 20 May where the professional juries of each country watched and voted on the competing entries.

The stage show featured Marta Jandová and Václav Noid Bárta appearing on stage wearing black outfits. The LED screens displayed rotating mirrors that transitioned from images of dark starry skies to a sunrise with volcanic eruptions as the song progressed. A feature of the performance included Marta Jandová taking her high heel shoes off and throwing them behind her, which was explained by Jandová: "The idea comes from my past, when I was touring with my band Die Happy. I promised our fans that I would wear a dress and high heels. And after a few songs on the first concert my feet were hurting so much that I just took my shoes and threw them behind the stage. Then I kept on doing this and it became somehow my sign—that when I sing on high heels, I throw them away. I don't do it very often but we decided to do it at Eurovision because in the middle of our song there is a breakthrough, and there is no more place for high heels."

At the end of the show, the Czech Republic was not announced among the top 10 entries in the second semi-final and therefore failed to qualify to compete in the final. It was later revealed that Czech Republic placed thirteenth in the semi-final, receiving a total of 33 points.

=== Voting ===
Voting during the three shows consisted of 50 percent public televoting and 50 percent from a jury deliberation. The jury consisted of five music industry professionals who were citizens of the country they represent, with their names published before the contest to ensure transparency. This jury was asked to judge each contestant based on: vocal capacity; the stage performance; the song's composition and originality; and the overall impression by the act. In addition, no member of a national jury could be related in any way to any of the competing acts in such a way that they cannot vote impartially and independently. The individual rankings of each jury member were released shortly after the grand final.

Following the release of the full split voting by the EBU after the conclusion of the competition, it was revealed that the Czech Republic had placed tenth with the public televote and twelfth with the jury vote in the second semi-final. In the public vote, the Czech Republic scored 51 points, while with the jury vote, the Czech Republic scored 34 points.

Below is a breakdown of points awarded to the Czech Republic and awarded by the Czech Republic in the second semi-final and grand final of the contest, and the breakdown of the jury voting and televoting conducted during the two shows:

==== Points awarded to the Czech Republic ====
Points awarded to the Czech Republic (Semi-final 2)
Score	Country
12 points	
10 points	
8 points	Israel; Poland
7 points	
6 points	
5 points	
4 points	Germany; San Marino
3 points	Slovenia
2 points	
1 point	Ireland; Latvia; Malta; Montenegro; Portugal; Sweden

==== Points awarded by the Czech Republic ====
Points awarded by the Czech Republic (Semi-final 2)
Score	Country
12 points	Sweden
10 points	Azerbaijan
8 points	Latvia
7 points	Norway
6 points	Montenegro
5 points	Ireland
4 points	Malta
3 points	Slovenia
2 points	Israel
1 point	Lithuania

Points awarded by the Czech Republic (Final)
Score	Country
12 points	Azerbaijan
10 points	Sweden
8 points	Russia
7 points	Italy
6 points	Belgium
5 points	Latvia
4 points	Georgia
3 points	Serbia
2 points	Armenia
1 point	Hungary

==== Detailed voting results ====
The following members comprised the Czech jury:

- Jitka Benešová (jury chairperson) – radio DJ
- Honza Dědek – DJ, songwriter
- Jaroslav Špulák – author of lyrics, writer
- Vladimír Bár – artist, music editor
- Jan Maxián – composer

Detailed voting results from the Czech Republic (Semi-final 2)
R/O	Country	J. Benešová	H. Dědek	J. Špulák	V. Bár	J. Maxián	Jury Rank	Televote Rank	Combined Rank	Points
01	Lithuania	12	8	11	13	7	10	8	10	1
02	Ireland	4	1	5	4	6	3	12	6	5
03	San Marino	13	10	14	14	11	14	14	16	
04	Montenegro	11	15	9	3	9	8	7	5	6
05	Malta	5	4	6	5	5	5	11	7	4
06	Norway	3	9	2	6	3	4	10	4	7
07	Portugal	15	11	7	10	8	11	16	15	
08	Czech Republic									
09	Israel	16	16	16	16	16	16	2	9	2
10	Latvia	8	3	4	8	4	6	5	3	8
11	Azerbaijan	2	6	3	2	2	2	3	2	10
12	Iceland	14	7	10	11	13	12	15	14	
13	Sweden	1	2	1	1	1	1	1	1	12
14	Switzerland	6	5	8	12	12	7	13	12	
15	Cyprus	7	13	12	7	10	9	9	11	
16	Slovenia	10	12	13	9	15	13	4	8	3
17	Poland	9	14	15	15	14	15	6	13	

Detailed voting results from the Czech Republic (Final)
R/O	Country	J. Benešová	H. Dědek	J. Špulák	V. Bár	J. Maxián	Jury Rank	Televote Rank	Combined Rank	Points
01	Slovenia	14	18	24	18	26	22	21	25	
02	France	12	5	3	10	3	5	27	14	
03	Israel	27	15	26	27	22	27	8	19	
04	Estonia	23	24	11	11	21	18	14	13	
05	United Kingdom	18	22	19	12	27	21	26	27	
06	Armenia	15	20	14	19	23	19	1	9	2
07	Lithuania	19	6	8	23	18	16	18	18	
08	Serbia	16	11	7	22	13	13	6	8	3
09	Norway	3	14	5	3	7	4	22	11	
10	Sweden	1	2	1	1	4	1	5	2	10
11	Cyprus	17	10	15	9	19	14	23	21	
12	Australia	26	13	12	8	14	15	24	24	
13	Belgium	4	1	2	21	10	6	9	5	6
14	Austria	5	26	18	7	11	12	25	22	
15	Greece	8	12	23	14	25	17	17	17	
16	Montenegro	22	25	27	24	16	26	19	26	
17	Germany	6	19	9	4	8	8	20	12	
18	Poland	9	23	22	25	24	24	15	23	
19	Latvia	2	3	6	13	6	3	12	6	5
20	Romania	21	27	25	26	12	25	11	20	
21	Spain	20	21	21	17	17	20	13	16	
22	Hungary	13	16	10	6	9	9	16	10	1
23	Georgia	24	4	16	16	5	10	7	7	4
24	Azerbaijan	7	7	4	2	1	2	4	1	12
25	Russia	10	8	13	5	2	7	2	3	8
26	Albania	25	17	20	20	20	23	10	15	
27	Italy	11	9	17	15	15	11	3	4	7
