= Martina Bárta =

Czech jazz singer and French hornist

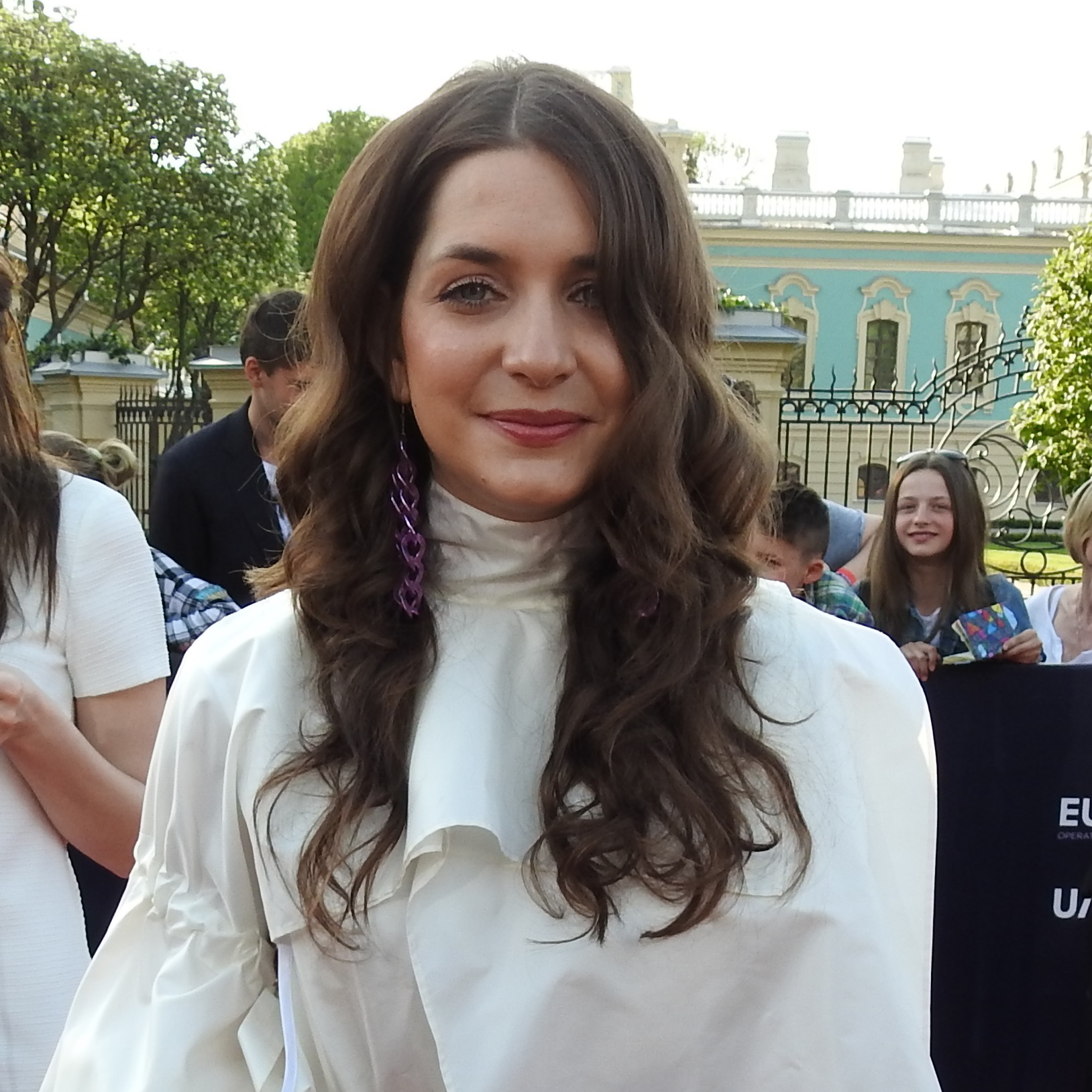
- Martina Bárta during Eurovision Song Contest 2017 opening ceremony

Background information
- Born: 1 September 1988 (age 38); Prague, Czechoslovakia
- Genres: Jazz; soul
- Occupation: Singer
- Instruments: Vocals; French horn
- Years active: 2010–present
- Website: martinabarta.com

Martina Bárta (Czech pronunciation: [ˈmarcɪna ˈbaːrta]; born 1 September 1988) is a Czech jazz singer and musician. A vocalist and French horn player, she was part of the Frankfurt am Main-based jazz band 4 to the Bar. She also had a role in the musical Robin Hood and worked with Felix Slováček and Karel Gott.

She represented the Czech Republic in the Eurovision Song Contest 2017 with the song My Turn but failed to qualify to the final. In 2018, she took part in Deutschland sucht den Superstar and reached the recall.

== Discography ==
=== Singles ===
Title	Year	Album
"My Turn"	2017	Non-album single

Awards and achievements
Preceded by Gabriela Gunčíková with "I Stand"	Czech Republic in the Eurovision Song Contest; 2017	Succeeded by Mikolas Josef with "Lie to Me"
