= Marta Jandová =

Czech singer (born 1974)

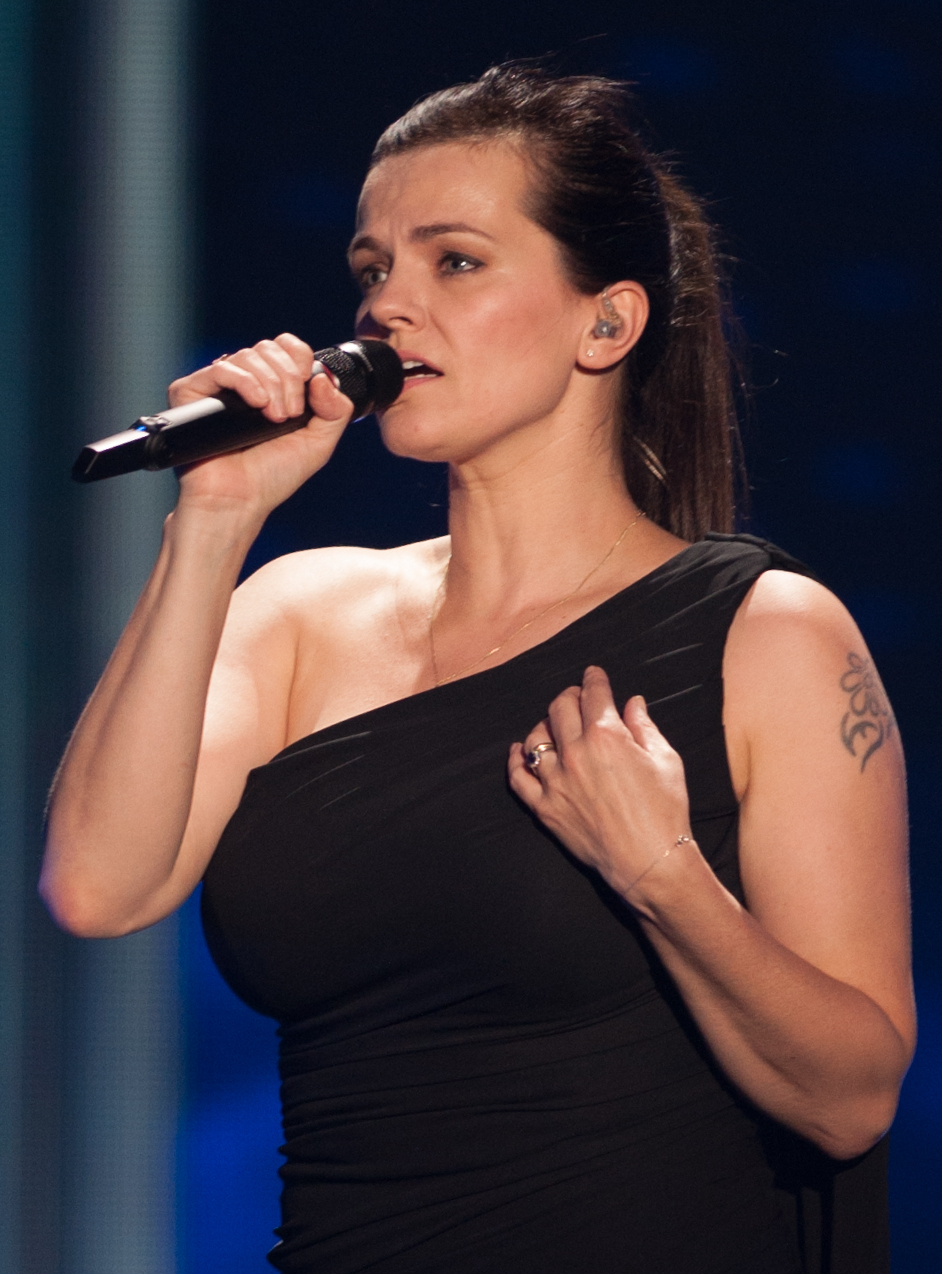
- Jandová in 2015

Background information
- Born: 13 April 1974 (age 52); Prague, Czechoslovakia
- Occupation: Singer
- Years active: 1993–present
- Label: Sony BMG
- Website: martajandova.de

Marta Verner (née Jandová; born 13 April 1974) is a Czech singer, best known for being the lead singer of the German alternative rock band Die Happy. She represented the Czech Republic in the Eurovision Song Contest 2015 along with Václav Noid Bárta with the song "Hope Never Dies".

== Career ==
In 2005, Jandová performed with Finnish metal band Apocalyptica and represented Baden-Württemberg in the Bundesvision Song Contest 2005 with the song "Wie weit", placing 5th with 77 points. She returned to the Bundesvision Song Contest in 2007, performing with Neue Deutsche Härte band Oomph! whilst representing Lower Saxony with the song "Träumst du?", winning the contest with 147 points. The song reached the top ten in the German Media Control Charts.

Jandová returned to her hometown in Prague in 2008 where she sang in the musical Mona Lisa, but still has a strong relationship to Germany, as she hosted the German TV show neoMusic in 2009.

== Personal life ==
Jandová is the daughter of Petr Janda, longtime frontman of the rock band Olympic, She lives with Czech gynecologist Miroslav Verner and gave birth to their daughter Marie on 7 August 2013.

== See also ==
- Czech Republic in the Eurovision Song Contest 2015

Awards and achievements
Preceded by Gipsy.cz with "Aven Romale"	Czech Republic in the Eurovision Song Contest; 2015 (with Václav Noid Bárta)	Succeeded by Gabriela Gunčíková with "I Stand"
