= Sexsational =

Sexsational or Sexsacional may refer to:

- Sexsacional..! (Lalo Rodríguez album), released in 1989
- Sexsational (Tony Thompson album), released in 1995
- Sexsational (Tom Malar album), released in 2005
