= Martin Němec =

Martin Němec may refer to:

- Martin Němec (musician) (born 1957), Czech rock musician and composer
- Martin Němec (athlete) (born 1974), Paralympian athlete from the Czech Republic
- Martin Nemec (volleyball) (born 1984), Slovak volleyball player
