= Czech Republic in the Eurovision Song Contest 2009 =

- Eurovision Song Contest 2009
- Participating broadcaster: Česká televize (ČT)
- Country: Czech Republic
- Selection process: Artist: Internal selection Song: Eurosong 2009
- Selection date: Artist: 30 January 2009; Song: 14 March 2009

Competing entry
- Song: "Aven Romale"
- Artist: Gipsy.cz
- Songwriters: Radoslav Banga

Placement
- Final result: Failed to qualify (18th)

Participation chronology

The Czech Republic was represented at the Eurovision Song Contest 2009 with the song "Aven Romale", written by Radoslav "Gipsy" Banga, and performed by the group Gipsy.cz. The Czech participating broadcaster, Česká televize (ČT), announced Gipsy.cz as its representative on 30 January 2009, and organised the national final Eurosong 2009 in order to select the song that Gipsy.cz would perform. Two songs were presented on 28 February 2009 and the public had until 14 March to vote for their favourite song, which resulted in "Aven Romale" as the Czech entry on 14 March 2009.

The Czech Republic was drawn to compete in the first semi-final of the Eurovision Song Contest which took place on 12 May 2009. Performing during the show in position 2, "Aven Romale" was not announced among the 10 qualifying entries of the first semi-final and therefore did not qualify to compete in the final. It was later revealed that the Czech Republic placed eighteenth (last) out of the 18 participating countries in the semi-final failing to score any points. This marked the first time the Czech Republic had scored nul points since they debuted in the contest in 2007.

== Background ==
Prior to the 2009 contest, Česká televize (ČT) had participated in the Eurovision Song Contest representing the Czech Republic twice since its first entry in 2007. It competed in 2007 and 2008 without qualifying to the final: in 2007, Kabát performing "Malá dáma" placed 28th (last) in the semi-final achieving only one point, while in 2008 Tereza Kerndlová performed "Have Some Fun" and placed 18th (second to last) in her semi-final scoring nine points.

As part of its duties as participating broadcaster, ČT organises the selection of its entry in the Eurovision Song Contest and broadcasts the event in the country. The broadcaster used national finals to select its entry on both occasions. ČT confirmed its intentions to participate at the 2009 contest in July 2008. The broadcaster later confirmed in January 2009 that the Czech artist for the 2009 contest would be selected internally, while the song would be selected through a national final.

== Before Eurovision ==
=== Eurosong 2009 ===
ČT internally selected its representative for the Eurovision Song Contest 2009. On 30 January 2009, the broadcaster announced that the group Gipsy.cz would represent the Czech Republic. Gipsy.cz previously attempted to represent the Czech Republic at the Eurovision Song Contest by competing in the national finals in 2007 and 2008, both placing in the top three with the songs "Muloland" and "Benga Beating", respectively. Apart from the announcement of Gipsy.cz as the Czech representative, Czech Television announced that the national final Eurosong 2009 would be organised in order to select their song.

Two songs written by Gipsy.cz member Radoslav Banga, titled "Aven Romale" and "Do You Wanna", were submitted by the group and announced during a press conference that took place on 16 February 2009 at the Hybernia Palace in Prague. The two songs were presented via the release of their official music videos, both directed by Cosmoboy, during the ČT2 programme Noc s Andělem, hosted by Pavel Anděl, on 28 February 2009 and the public was able to vote for their favourite song via SMS between 1 and 14 March 2009. The winning song, "Aven Romale", was announced on 14 March 2009 during Noc s Andělem. "Aven Romale" was the first song to have featured lyrics in the Romani language at the Eurovision Song Contest.

=== Promotion ===
Gipsy.cz specifically promoted "Aven Romale" as the Czech Eurovision entry on 8 March 2009 by performing during the final of the Slovak Eurosong 2009 Eurovision national final. The group also performed during the ČT Anděl Music Awards on 21 March, which was held at the Top Hotel in Prague and broadcast on ČT1.

== At Eurovision ==
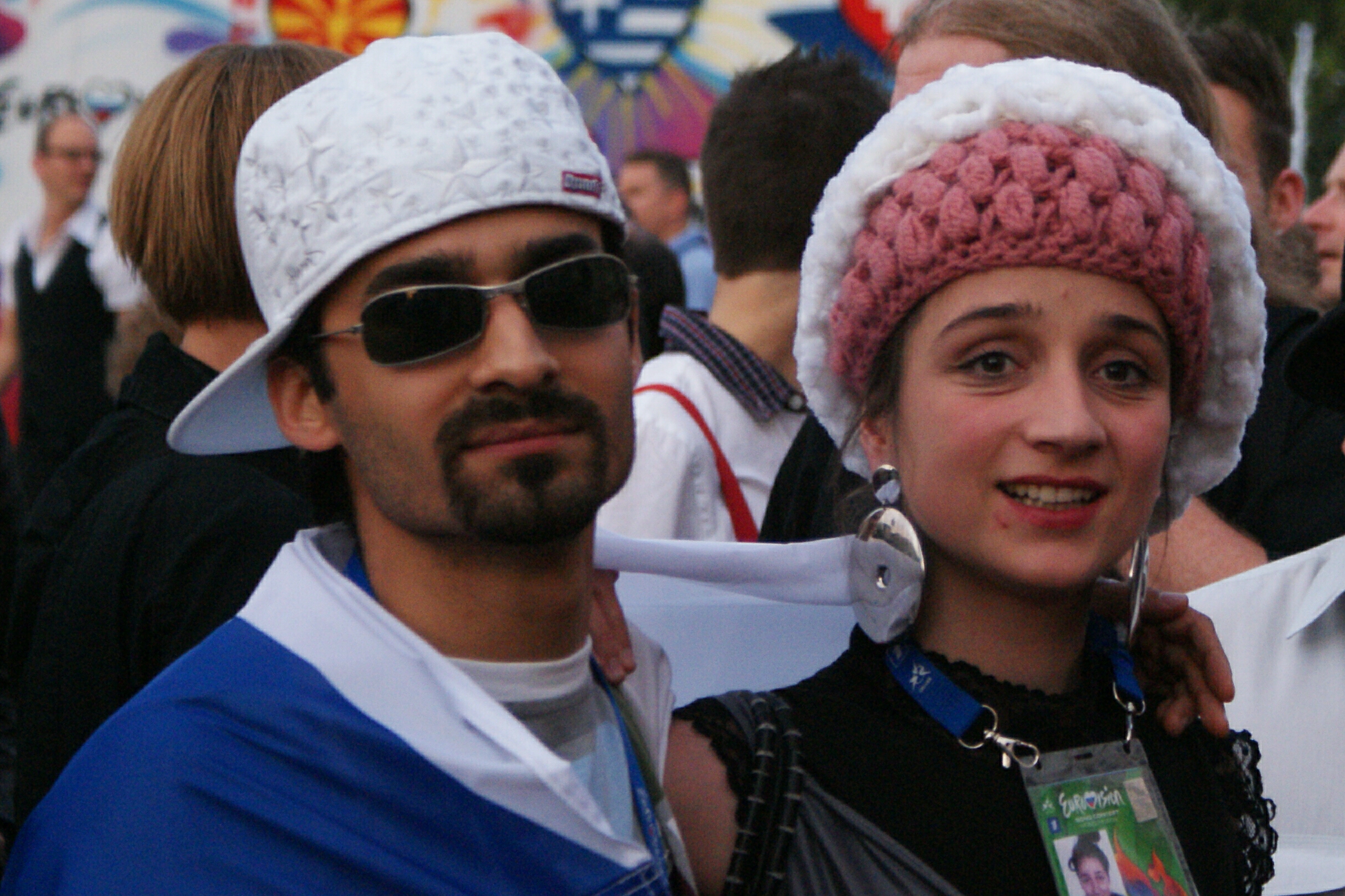
Members of Gipsy.cz at the Eurovision Opening Party in Moscow

According to Eurovision rules, all nations with the exceptions of the host country and the "Big Four" (France, Germany, Spain and the United Kingdom) are required to qualify from one of two semi-finals in order to compete for the final; the top nine songs from each semi-final as determined by televoting progress to the final, and a tenth was determined by back-up juries. The European Broadcasting Union (EBU) split up the competing countries into six different pots based on voting patterns from previous contests, with countries with favourable voting histories put into the same pot. On 30 January 2009, a special allocation draw was held which placed each country into one of the two semi-finals. Czech Republic was placed into the first semi-final, to be held on 12 May 2009. The running order for the semi-finals was decided through another draw on 16 March 2009 and Czech Republic was set to perform in position 2, following the entry from Montenegro and before the entry from Belgium.

In the Czech Republic, the first semi-final and the final were broadcast on ČT1 and featured commentary by Jan Rejžek. The Czech spokesperson, who announced the Czech votes during the final, was Petra Šubrtová.

=== Semi-final ===
Gipsy.cz took part in technical rehearsals on 3 and 7 May, followed by dress rehearsals on 11 and 12 May. The Czech performance featured the members of Gipsy.cz appearing on stage with lead singer Radoslav "Gipsy" Banga who played the character "Super Gipsy" wearing a red costume with yellow stripes. The LED screens displayed comic strip pictures depicting "Super Gipsy" with a Parental Advisory label, a dustbin and a barcode shown in the background.

At the end of the show, Czech Republic was not announced among the top 10 entries in the first semi-final and therefore failed to qualify to compete in the final. It was later revealed that Czech Republic placed eighteenth (last) in the semi-final, receiving a total of no points. This marked the first time the Czech Republic had scored zero points since they debuted in the contest in 2007, and the sixteenth time in the history of the contest a song had received nul points.

=== Voting ===
The voting system for 2009 involved each country awarding points from 1-8, 10 and 12, with the points in the final being decided by a combination of 50% national jury and 50% televoting. Each nation's jury consisted of five music industry professionals who are citizens of the country they represent. This jury judged each entry based on: vocal capacity; the stage performance; the song's composition and originality; and the overall impression by the act. No member of a national jury was also permitted to be related in any way to any of the competing acts in such a way that they cannot vote impartially and independently.

Below is a breakdown of points awarded to Czech Republic and awarded by Czech Republic in the first semi-final and grand final of the contest. The nation awarded its 12 points to Armenia in the semi-final and the final of the contest.

==== Points awarded to the Czech Republic ====
The Czech Republic scored zero points at the 2009 Eurovision Song Contest.

==== Points awarded by the Czech Republic ====
Points awarded by the Czech Republic (Semi-final 1)
Score	Country
12 points	Armenia
10 points	Iceland
8 points	Bosnia and Herzegovina
7 points	Malta
6 points	Sweden
5 points	Turkey
4 points	Israel
3 points	Macedonia
2 points	Portugal
1 point	Belarus

Points awarded by the Czech Republic (Final)
Score	Country
12 points	Armenia
10 points	Azerbaijan
8 points	Russia
7 points	Portugal
6 points	United Kingdom
5 points	Ukraine
4 points	Israel
3 points	Norway
2 points	Iceland
1 point	Turkey

==== Detailed voting results ====
The following members comprised the Czech jury:

- Andrea Savane
- Petr Čáp
- Jitka Benešová
- Michal Dvořák
- Vladimir Vlasák

Detailed voting results from the Czech Republic (Final)
R/O	Country	Results			Points
R/O	Country	Jury	Televoting	Combined	Points
01	Lithuania				
02	Israel	8		8	4
03	France	1		1	
04	Sweden				
05	Croatia				
06	Portugal	12		12	7
07	Iceland	4	3	7	2
08	Greece		5	5	
09	Armenia	7	10	17	12
10	Russia	6	6	12	8
11	Azerbaijan		12	12	10
12	Bosnia and Herzegovina		4	4	
13	Moldova	3	2	5	
14	Malta	2		2	
15	Estonia				
16	Denmark				
17	Germany				
18	Turkey	5	1	6	1
19	Albania				
20	Norway		7	7	3
21	Ukraine		8	8	5
22	Romania				
23	United Kingdom	10		10	6
24	Finland				
25	Spain				

== After Eurovision ==
Following the poor results in this and previous contests, Czech Television decided against participating in the 2010 contest, and the Czech Republic would subsequently not participate in the Eurovision Song Contest again until 2015.
