= Hedl =

Hedl is a surname. Notable people with the surname include:

- Drago Hedl (born 1950), Croatian investigative journalist
- Jan Sahara Hedl (born 1957), Czech singer-songwriter
- Raimund Hedl (born 1974), Austrian football player and coach
