= Gabriela Gunčíková =

Czech singer

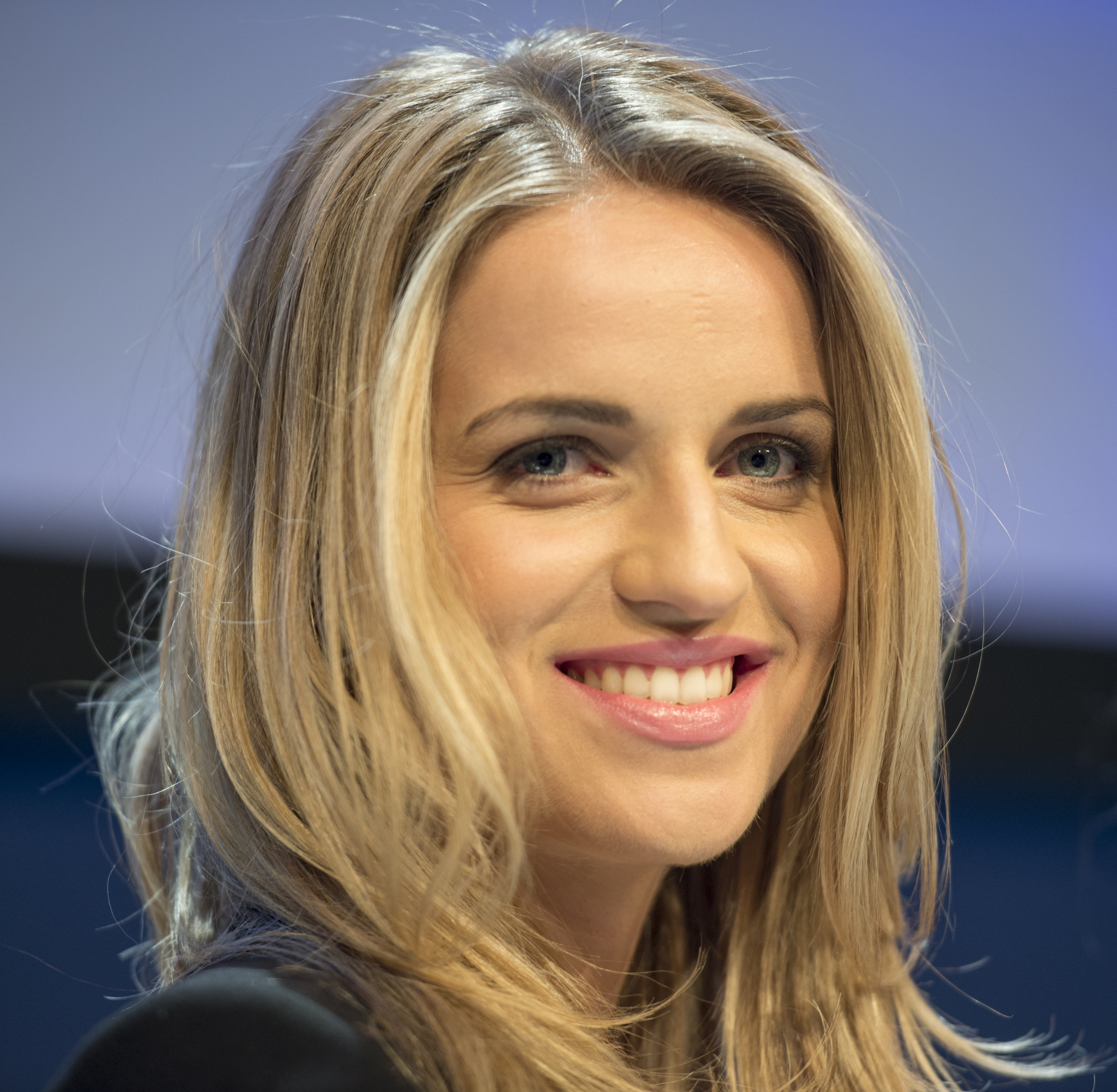
- Gunčíková in 2016

Background information
- Also known as: Gabriela Gun
- Born: 27 June 1993 (age 33); Kroměříž, Czech Republic
- Genres: Pop; rock
- Occupation: Singer
- Years active: 2011–present
- Label: Universal
- Website: www.gabrielagun.com

Gabriela Gunčíková (Czech pronunciation: [ˈɡabrɪjɛla ˈɡuntʃiːkovaː]; born 27 June 1993), also known as Gabriela Gun, is a Czech singer. Her singing voice has been described as a cross between Sheryl Crow and Ann Wilson of Heart. She was the runner-up of the second season of Česko Slovenská SuperStar and won the New Artist award at the 2011 Český slavík awards. Gunčíková was a touring vocalist of the Trans-Siberian Orchestra from 2014 until 2015. She represented the Czech Republic at the Eurovision Song Contest 2016 in Stockholm with "I Stand".

Since April 2025, she, as "A Nameless Ghoul", has been performing with the Swedish band Ghost.

== Life and career ==
=== 2011–2015: SuperStar 2011 and work with Trans-Siberian Orchestra ===
In 2011, Gunčíková became a finalist on the second season of the Czech-Slovak version of Pop Idol, titled Česko Slovenská SuperStar. She ended up as the show's runner-up, placing behind the Slovak winner Lukáš Adamec. She was the highest placing Czech contestant during the season. Following the show's ending, she was signed to Universal Music Group and released her debut album Dvojí tvář later in the year. Gunčíková appeared on the fifth season of the Slovak version of Dancing with the Stars, Let's Dance, which began airing on 9 September 2011. She was paired with professional dancer Peter Modrovský until the dance couple was eliminated on 14 October 2011, finishing in seventh place. She became one of the highest placing Czech celebrities on the show. Gunčíková went on to win the New Artist award at the 2011 Český slavík awards.

=== Let's Dance ===
In 2011 she was part of Slovak dancing competition Let's Dance where she was paired with dancer and two-time champion Peter Modrovský.

Week	Dance/Song	Judges' score				Result
Week	Dance/Song	Bednárik	Chlopčík	Rolins	Ďurovčík	Result
1	Quickstep/ "99 Luftballons"	3	3	4	4	Safe
2	Cha cha cha/ "Forget You"	3	3	3	4	Safe
3	Tango/"Bust Your Windows"	8	9	10	6	Safe
4	Salsa/"Acuyuye"	6	6	7	4	Last to be called safe
5	Slowfox/"Always Look on the Bright Side of Life"	8	6	7	5	Safe
6	Samba/"Dr. Beat"	7	4	9	4	Eliminated

In 2013, Gunčíková began working with American vocal coach Ken Tamplin. She released her second studio album Celkem jiná this year as well. She graduated from Tamplin's classes in 2014 and subsequently joined the American progressive rock band Trans-Siberian Orchestra as a touring vocalist. She departed from the band the following year.

=== 2015–present: Eurovision Song Contest 2016 and other work ===
In March 2016, Gunčíková was announced as the Czech entrant to the Eurovision Song Contest 2016 with the song "I Stand". She competed in the second half of the first semi-final on 10 May 2016 in Stockholm, Sweden, and qualified for the grand final (she was the first Czech entrant to do so), where she performed second, and finished in 25th place. Currently she is a touring ghoul with the band Ghost and has been since April 2025.

== Discography ==
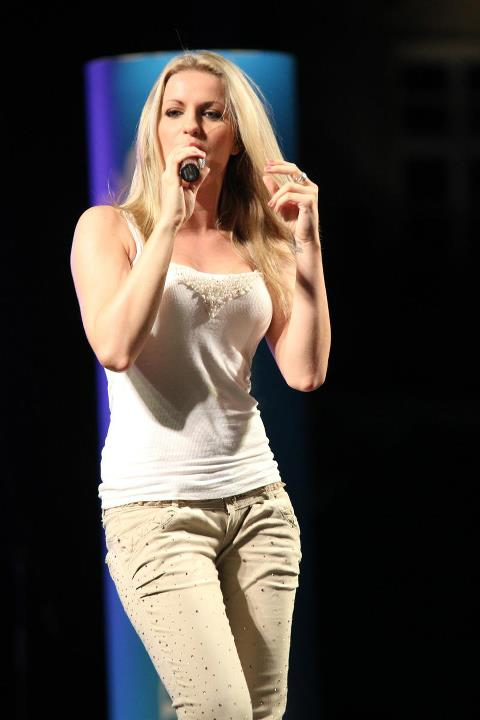
Gunčíková in 2011

=== Studio albums ===
Title	Details
Dvoji Tvar	Released: 2011; Format: Digital download, CD; Label: Universal Music Group
Celkem Jiná	Released: 29 May 2013; Format: Digital download, CD; Label: Lewron Music Center

=== Singles ===
Title	Year	Peak chart positions	Album
Title	Year	CZE (Dig.)	Album
"I Stand"	2016	48	Non-album single

== Awards and nominations ==
Year	Nominated work	Award	Category	Result	Ref
2011	Herself	Český slavík	Best New Artist	Won	

Awards and achievements
Preceded by Marta Jandová & Václav Noid Bárta with "Hope Never Dies"	Czech Republic in the Eurovision Song Contest; 2016	Succeeded by Martina Bárta with "My Turn"
