= Gipsy.cz =

Czech Romani hip hop group

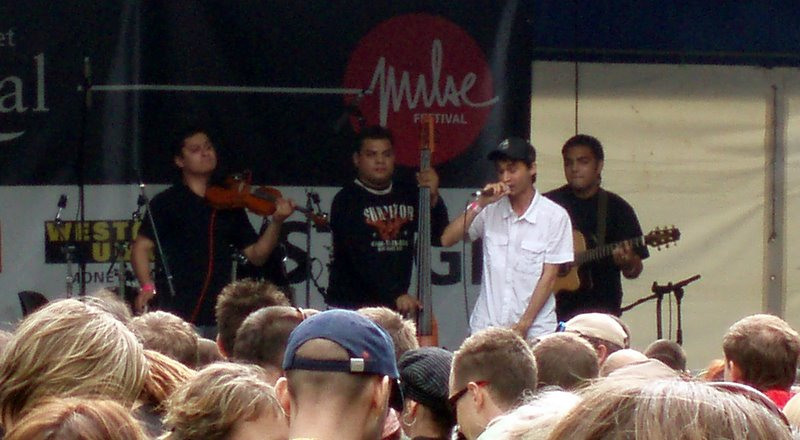
- Gipsy.cz performing in 2007

Background information
- Origin: Czech Republic
- Genre: Hip hop
- Years active: 2004–present
- Labels: Bangatone Records; Indies; Supraphon
- Members: Radek Banga; Tomáš Baroš; Jan Sochor; Viliam Didiáš
- Past members: Vojta Lavička; Noemi Fialová; Tibor Žida; Matěj Černý; Oliver Lipenský; Petr Surmaj; Jan Surmaj
- Website: gipsy.cz

Gipsy.cz is a Czech Romani hip-hop group. They performed at the Glastonbury Festival in 2007, and they represented their country at the Eurovision Song Contest 2009 in Moscow, with the song "Aven Romale", reaching last place in the first semi-final, with zero points. The band plays a combination of hip hop and traditional Romani music, sung primarily in the Romani language, with some lyrics in Czech and English. As of 2013, they have released four studio albums.

== History ==
=== Beginnings; Romano Hip Hop: 2004–2008 ===
In 2004, rapper Radovan "Radek" Banga released the solo album Ya favourite Cd Rom and later met violinist Vojta Lavička and brothers Jan (upright bass) and Petr Surmaj (guitar and accordion), with whom he formed the group Gipsy.cz. They rose to fame in 2006 with the single "Romano Hip Hop", from the album of the same name, which reached the MTV World Chart Express and was later certified Gold in the Czech Republic. Also in 2006, the band won Discovery of the Year at the Anděl Awards.

In 2007, they took part in the Czech preliminary round for the Eurovision Song Contest with the song "Muloland", but only reached second place. Later that year, Gipsy.cz was the first Czech group to perform at the Glastonbury Festival. Additionally, their song "Jednou" was included on the Gypsy Groove compilation album published by Putumayo in 2007.

At the 2008 Český slavík, they won the Rising Star of the Year award.

=== Reprezent, Desperado, Upgrade: 2008–2013 ===
In June 2008, Gipsy.cz released their second studio album, Reprezent. It reached second place on the World Music Chart in Europe, remaining there for four weeks. The song "A na závěr si s námi dejte trochu té Čunárny" stimulated discussion, as the title and lyrics mocked politician Jiří Čunek, who is known for his anti-Roma comments. In order to avoid a possible lawsuit, Gipsy.cz eventually released an alternate version of the song, without the offending lyrics.

The band took part in the Czech preliminary round for the Eurovision Song Contest in 2008, but again failed to qualify.

Jan and Petr Surmaj left Gipsy.cz in January 2009, and after filling out the vacant musical seats, the band finally succeeded in their repeated attempts to represent the Czech Republic at the Eurovision Song Contest in Moscow, Russia, with their song "Aven Romale". They finished last in the first semi-final, without receiving a single point.

In February and March 2011, Gipsy.cz toured Australia as part of the Karavan Festival. In April of the same year, their third studio album, Desperado, was released. Two years later, the band issued their fourth record, Upgrade.

== Band members ==
Romano Hip Hop

Studio album by Gipsy.cz
- Released: 20 November 2006
- Label: Indies Scope

Gipsy.cz chronology
Romano Hip Hop (2006)	Reprezent (2008)

Current

- Radoslav Banga aka Gipsy – vocals
- Tomáš Baroš – electric upright bass
- Jan Sochor – accordion
- Viliam Didiáš – violin

Past

- Vojta Lavička – violin, vocals
- Noemi Fialová – violin, vocals
- Tibor Žida – guitar, vocals
- Matěj Černý – bass
- Oliver Lipenský – drums
- Petr Surmaj – guitar, accordion
- Jan Surmaj – electric upright bass

== Discography ==
- Romano Hip Hop (2006)
- Reprezent (2008)
- Desperado (2011)
- Upgrade (2013)

Reprezent

Studio album by Gipsy.cz
- Released: 5 June 2008
- Label: Indies Scope

Gipsy.cz chronology
Romano Hip Hop (2006)	Reprezent (2008)	Desperado (2011)

== Awards ==
- 2005 Anděl Awards
  - Best Hip Hop Album nomination
- 2006 Anděl Awards
  - Best Album in the World nomination
  - Best New Artist nomination (won)

Awards and achievements
Preceded by Tereza Kerndlová with "Have Some Fun"	Czech Republic in the Eurovision Song Contest; 2009	Succeeded by Marta Jandová & Václav Noid Bárta with "Hope Never Dies"
