= Český slavík =

Czech annual music award

- Awarded for: Popularity in the Czech music industry
- Country: Czech Republic
- First award: 1996
- Final award: 2025

Highlights
- Most wins: Lucie Bílá (21)
- Website: Official website

Český slavík (English: Czech Nightingale) is an award meant to recognize outstanding achievement and annual popularity in the Czech music industry. It was established in 1996 as the successor to the Zlatý slavík awards, which were established in 1962 in Czechoslovakia by the magazine Mladý svět and continued until 1991.

From 1999 to 2017, the award was sponsored by the mineral water bottling company Mattoni and hence officially known as Český slavík Mattoni.

In 2018, the award was cancelled due to vote manipulation in favor of the controversial group Ortel the previous year. In 2021, the event was revived with the support of entrepreneur Karel Janeček. A year later, the award came under the ownership of TV Nova.

Český slavík prizes are awarded in the categories Absolute Nightingale, Female Singer, Male Singer, Group, Hip Hop, Discovery of the Year, and Hall of Fame. Former categories include Slovak Artist, Biggest Gainer, and Internet Star.

== Winners ==
| Year | Male singer | Female singer | Group | Absolute Nightingale | Discovery of the year | Hip Hop & Rap | Hall of Fame |
| 1996 | Karel Gott | Lucie Bílá | Olympic | | | | |
| 1997 | Karel Gott | Lucie Bílá | Olympic | | | | |
| 1998 | Daniel Hůlka | Lucie Bílá | Olympic | Lucie Bílá | | | |
| 1999 | Karel Gott | Lucie Bílá | Lucie | Lucie Bílá | | | |
| 2000 | Karel Gott | Lucie Bílá | Lucie | Lucie Bílá | | | |
| 2001 | Karel Gott | Lucie Bílá | Lucie | Lucie Bílá | | | |
| 2002 | Karel Gott | Lucie Bílá | Lucie | Lucie Bílá | | | |
| 2003 | Karel Gott | Lucie Bílá | Kabát | Lucie Bílá | Rebeka | | |
| 2004 | Karel Gott | Lucie Bílá | Kabát | Lucie Bílá | Aneta Langerová | | |
| 2005 | Karel Gott | Aneta Langerová | Chinaski | Aneta Langerová | Vlastimil Horváth | | |
| 2006 | Karel Gott | Aneta Langerová | Divokej Bill | Aneta Langerová | Ewa Farna | | |
| 2007 | Karel Gott | Lucie Bílá | Kabát | Lucie Bílá | Josef Vágner | | |
| 2008 | Karel Gott | Lucie Bílá | Kabát | Karel Gott | Marek Ztracený | | |
| 2009 | Karel Gott | Lucie Bílá | Kabát | Karel Gott | Martin Chodúr | | |
| 2010 | Karel Gott | Lucie Bílá | Kabát | Lucie Bílá | Markéta Konvičková | | |
| 2011 | Karel Gott | Lucie Bílá | Kabát | Lucie Bílá | Gabriela Gunčíková | | |
| 2012 | Tomáš Klus | Lucie Bílá | Kabát | Lucie Bílá | Koblížci | | |
| 2013 | Karel Gott | Lucie Bílá | Kryštof | Karel Gott | Adam Mišík | | |
| 2014 | Karel Gott | Lucie Bílá | Kabát | Karel Gott | Elis | | |
| 2015 | Karel Gott | Lucie Bílá | Kabát | Karel Gott | Slza | | |
| 2016 | Karel Gott | Lucie Bílá | Kabát | Karel Gott | Pekař | | |
| 2017 | Karel Gott | Lucie Bílá | Kabát | Lucie Bílá | Mirai | | |
| 2018 | not awarded | not awarded | not awarded | not awarded | not awarded | | |
| 2019 | not awarded | not awarded | not awarded | not awarded | not awarded | | |
| 2020 | not awarded | not awarded | not awarded | not awarded | not awarded | | |
| 2021 | Marek Ztracený | Ewa Farna | Mirai | Marek Ztracený | Michal Horák | Řezník | |
| 2022 | Marek Ztracený | Lucie Bílá | Kabát | Lucie Bílá | Calin | ATMO music | Jiří Suchý |
| 2023 | Marek Ztracený | Ewa Farna | Kabát | Ewa Farna | Tereza Balonová | Calin | Václav Neckář |
| 2024 | Marek Ztracený | Ewa Farna | Kabát | Ewa Farna | Sofian Medjmedj | Calin | Marta Kubišová |
| 2025 | Václav Noid Bárta | Ewa Farna | Kabát | Ewa Farna | Renne Dang | Calin | Vladimír Mišík |

== Leaders ==
With 21 Český slavík awards, Lucie Bílá is the most successful artist in the history of the award. She is followed by Karel Gott, with 20 awards, the band Kabát, which has earned 16 awards, and the groups No Name and Lucie at 10 and 4, respectively.

| Rank | Artist | Total awards |
|---|---|---|
| 1 | Lucie Bílá | 21 |
| 2 | Karel Gott | 20 |
| 3 | Kabát | 16 |
| 4 | No Name | 10 |
| 5 | Lucie | 4 |
| 6 | Marek Ztracený | 4 |
| 7 | Ewa Farna | 4 |

== See also ==
- Slávik Awards
