= Tom Malar =

Czech R&B singer, songwriter, and producer

- Born: Tomáš Malár; 26 August 1980 (age 45); Zlín, Czech Republic
- Genres: R&B, soul, hip-hop, pop
- Occupations: Singer, songwriter, lyricist, producer
- Instruments: Vocals, Acoustic Guitar
- Years active: 2004–present
- Labels: 7us media group
- Website: www.facebook.com/TomMalarOfficial

Tom Malar (born 26 August 1980) is a Czech R&B singer, songwriter and producer.

== Music career ==
Malar’s career started in 2004 with the recording of his debut single Sexsational. Originally it was recorded without any professional intent, but the EMP label was so impressed it decided to offer Malar a record deal and officially release the single. It became a no. 1 hit song in both countries and the most aired song in the Czech Republic for the year 2004.

== Discography ==
=== Studio albums ===
- 2005: Sexsational
- 2014: MALAR&B
