= Tereza Kerndlová =

Czech singer (born 1986)

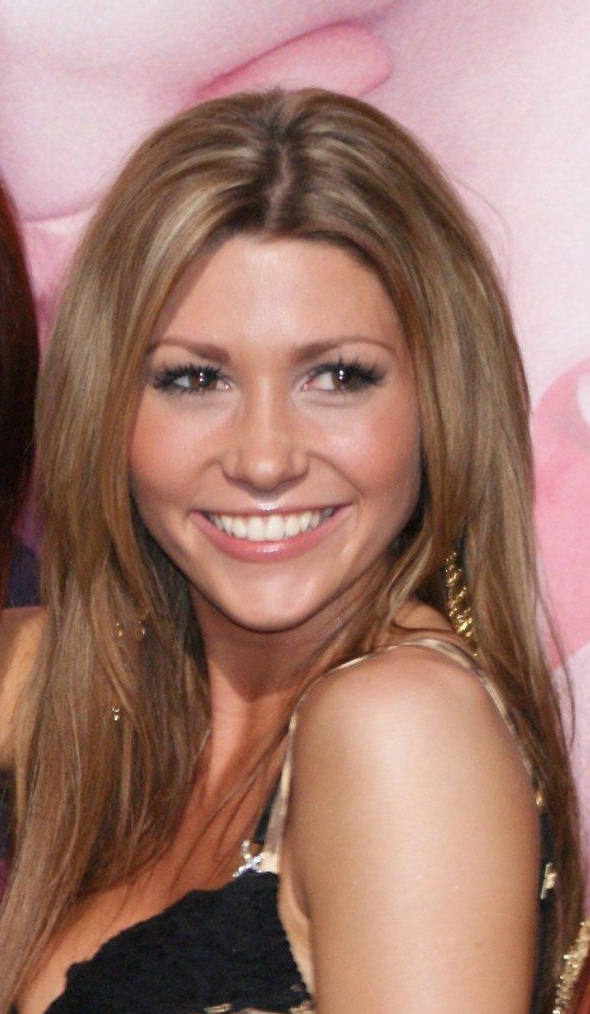
- Tereza Kerndlová in 2008

Background information
- Born: Tereza Kerndlová; 6 October 1986 (age 39); Brno, Czechoslovakia
- Origin: Brno
- Genres: Pop, R&b
- Occupation: singer
- Years active: 2001–present
- Label: Universal
- Website: www.kerndlovatereza.cz

Tereza Kerndlová (born 6 October 1986 in Brno) is a Czech singer. She rose to fame as a member of the trio Black Milk since 2001. After the trio split in 2005, she started a solo career and released the album Orchidej.

She represented the Czech Republic in the Eurovision Song Contest 2008 with the song "Have Some Fun", which was written by Gordon Pogoda (who wrote 4 songs on her album Have Some Fun) and Stano Simor (who produced the album). It was performed in the second semi-final on 22 May and finished 18th of 19 entrants with nine points.

== Discography ==
=== Studio albums ===
- Orchidej (2006)
- Have Some Fun (2007)
- Retro (2008)
- Schody z nebe (2011)
- Singles Collection (2013)

== Notes ==
Awards and achievements
Preceded by Kabát with "Malá dáma"	Czech Republic in the Eurovision Song Contest; 2008	Succeeded by Gipsy.cz with "Aven Romale"
