= Pavel Anděl =

Czech actor and writer (born 1966)

Pavel Anděl (born 1966, Cheb) is a Czech actor, musician, writer, dramaturge, and television presenter.

He graduated from the grammar school in Cheb. After graduating from briefly acting at Theatre Faculty of the Academy of Performing Arts in Prague at the Academy of Performing Arts in Prague, he started to act at the Příbram Theatre, and after five years, he performed in the Drama Studio in Ústí nad Labem. With moderating, he began on radio Evropa 2, about three years later, he worked in Prima TV, where he worked on the preparation of the show S.O.S. From 1998 to 2009, prepared jointly with the editor Jan Kratochvíl of ČT2 their own show Noc s Andělem, thanks to which he gained a certain notoriety. In addition, he is also a dramaturgical out to produce and ensure programs and Orange Musicblok. He is currently working on a radio show on 105.9 RockZone with his own eponymous show, Andělská dvacítka, and features his own TV show on TV Slušnej Kanál. He was a jury member for the jury panel of the Czech Republic during the Eurovision Song Contest 2016.
