= Josef Vojtek =

Czech singer

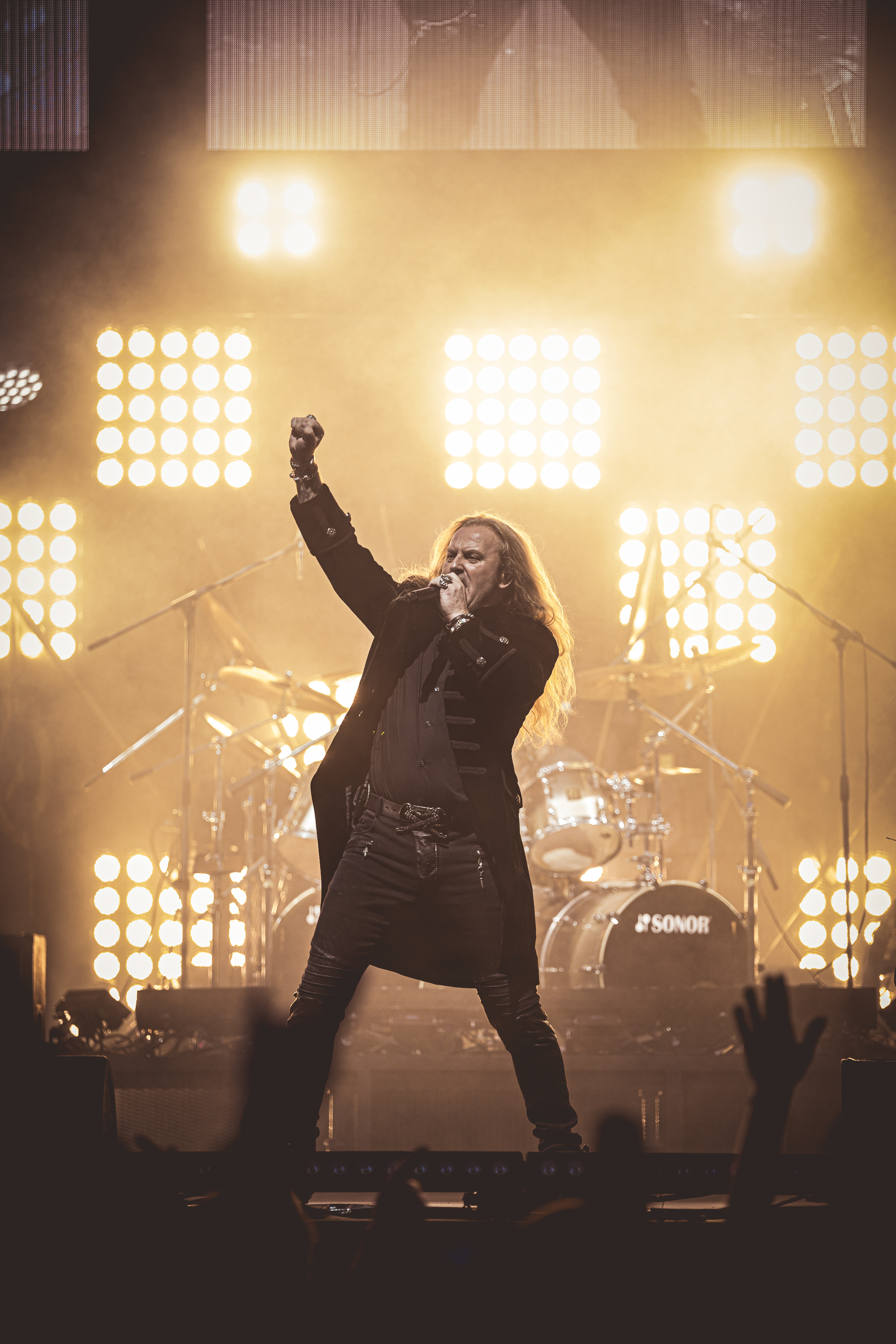
- Vojtek in 2022

Background information
- Born: 21 June 1965 (age 61); Teplice, Czechoslovakia
- Genres: Hard rock; thrash metal
- Occupation: Singer
- Instruments: Vocals; guitar
- Years active: 1988–present
- Website: kabat.cz/josef-vojtek/

Josef Vojtek (born 21 June 1965 in Teplice) is a Czech rock singer. He has been the lead singer of the Czech band Kabát since 1988. He was a judge on The Voice Česko Slovensko from 2012 to 2019. He won a Thalia Award in 2016 for his role in the musical Mefisto.
