= Jan Sahara Hedl =

Czech musician

- Born: Jan Hedl; 9 January 1957 (age 69); Prague, Czechoslovakia
- Genres: Rock
- Occupation: Musician
- Instruments: Guitar, vocals
- Years active: 1982–present
- Label: Monitor

Jan Hedl (born 9 January 1957, in Prague), known as Jan Sahara Hedl or simply Sahara, is a Czech singer-songwriter. Among his well-known hits are "Dívka a noc" and "Tisíc jmen".

== Biography ==
In his childhood he played piano. In high school, he met Martin Němec and later he founded his first band Duševní hrob with him. In 1982, he founded the band called Precedens together with Němec, who plays keyboards. Hedl left the band in 1984 and in 1994, he released his first solo album Tajnej svatej. In 1995, he released his second album Šílené pondělí, where Precedens served as backing band. His most recent album called Matka Zebra was released in 2001.

He is also a lyricist for other artists, such as Luboš Pospíšil. He also wrote lyrics for Czech musicals Excalibur and Obraz Doriana Graye.

== Discography ==
- Tajnej svatej (1994)
- Šílené pondělí (1995)
- Matka Zebra (2001)
