= Sexsational (Tom Malar album) =

Studio album by Tom Malar
- Released: October 2005
- Genre: R&B, soul, hip hop
- Length: 46:44
- Label: EMP
- Producer: Ludek Malar

Tom Malar chronology
Sexsational (2005)	MALAR&B (2012)

Singles from Sexsational
- 1. "Sexsational" Released: May 2004; 2. "Twist It Up" Released: September 2004; 3. "If Last Night Was Our Last Night" Released: February 2005; 4. "You Remind Me Of Something" Released: May 2005; 5. "Gravitate" Released: August 2005

Sexsational is the debut album by Czech R&B singer Tom Malar.

== Track listing ==
No.	Title	Writer(s)	Length
1.	"Sexsational"	Michael Jay, Sevon Daze
2.	"Always Be My Angel"
3.	"Closer"
4.	"Flipside"
5.	"Twist It Up"	Michael Jay, Marco Rakascan
6.	"Country Girl"
7.	"Hard Core"
8.	"Wish You Were Here"
9.	"You Remind Me Of Something"	R. Kelly, Barry Hankerson
10.	"If Last Night Was Our Last Night"	Oji Pierce, Michael Jay
11.	"She Wasn't Your Girlfriend Last Night"
12.	"Gravitate"	Jorge Corante, Scott Krippayne

Professional ratings
Review scores
Source	Rating
musicserver.cz	7/10 stars
muzikus.cz	3/7 stars

== Personnel ==
- Tom Malar – Vocals
