= Czech Republic in the Eurovision Song Contest 2008 =

- Eurovision Song Contest 2008
- Participating broadcaster: Česká televize (ČT)
- Country: Czech Republic
- Selection process: Eurosong 2008
- Selection date: 26 January 2008

Competing entry
- Song: "Have Some Fun"
- Artist: Tereza Kerndlová
- Songwriters: Gordon Pogoda; Stano Šimor

Placement
- Semi-final result: Failed to qualify (18th)

Participation chronology

The Czech Republic was represented at the Eurovision Song Contest 2008 with the song "Have Some Fun", written by Gordon Pogoda and Stano Šimor, and performed by Tereza Kerndlová. The Czech participating broadcaster, Česká televize (ČT), organised the national final Eurosong 2008 in order to select its entry for the contest. Ten entries competed in the national final which took place on 26 January 2008 and "Have Some Fun" performed by Tereza Kerndlová was selected as the winner entirely by a public vote.

The Czech Republic was drawn to compete in the second semi-final of the Eurovision Song Contest which took place on 22 May 2008. Performing during the show in position 8, "Have Some Fun" was not announced among the 10 qualifying entries of the second semi-final and therefore did not qualify to compete in the final. It was later revealed that Czech Republic placed eighteenth out of the 19 participating countries in the semi-final with 9 points.

== Background ==
Prior to the 2008 contest, Česká televize (ČT) had participated in the Eurovision Song Contest representing the Czech Republic only once, in 2007, when it failed to qualify to the final with "Malá dáma" performed by Kabát and placing 28th (last) in the semi-final achieving only one point.

As part of its duties as participating broadcaster, ČT organises the selection of its entry in the Eurovision Song Contest and broadcasts the event in the country. The broadcaster confirmed its intentions to participate at the 2008 contest in June 2007. ČT later confirmed in September 2007 that its entry for the 2008 contest would be selected through a national final.

== Before Eurovision ==
=== Eurosong 2008 ===
Eurosong 2008 was the national final organised by ČT in order to select its entry for the Eurovision Song Contest 2008. Ten entries participated in the competition which took place on 26 January 2008 at the Prazské Výstavište in Prague, hosted by Aleš Háma and Katerina Kristelová with the winner selected exclusively via a public televote. The show was broadcast on ČT1 as well as streamed online via the broadcaster's website.

==== Competing entries ====
ČT together with a four-member jury consisting of screenwriters Ivan Hubač and Martin Hrdinka, director Libor Kodad and producer Viktor Průša nominated ten artists for the national final, and their entries were presented to the public during a press conference on 3 January 2008. Among the competing artists were Gipsy.cz, L.B.P. and Sámer Issa which competed in the previous edition of Eurosong, while artists that were approached by ČT but declined to participate included singers Lucie Bílá and Jirí Korn as well as the group 4TET.

==== Final ====
The final took place on 26 January 2008. Ten entries competed and the winner, "Have Some Fun" performed by Tereza Kerndlová, was determined entirely by a public televote via SMS that was held between 3 and 26 January 2008. Over 90,000 votes were cast. Only the winner was announced, but it was later known that Sámer Issa had placed among the top three. In addition to the performances of the competing entries, the show was opened by singer Ewa Farna, while the band Elán, which represented Slovakia in 1993, performed as the interval act.

R/O	Artist	Song	Songwriter(s)
1	Sámer Issa	"Pick a Star"	Sámer Issa, Yuri Nikitin
2	Tereza Kerndlová	"Have Some Fun"	Gordon Pogoda, Stano Šimor
3	Le Monde	"Another Chance"	Tom Malar, Derrick Wilson, Peter Fider
4	Iva Frühlingová	"Partir et revenir"	François Welgryn, Jérôme Degey
5	Temperamento	"Další den prijde"	Jiří Weidemann, Filip Flusser
6	L.B.P.	"Don't Leave Me"	Markéta Poulíčková
7	Gipsy.cz	"Benga Beating"	Radoslav Banga
8	Toxique	"Two Sides"	Klára Vytisková
9	Čechomor	"Józef, mój kochany"	František Černý, Karel Holas
10	Daniel Nekonecný	"Holiday"	Daniel Konecný

=== Promotion ===
Tereza Kerndlová made several appearances across Europe to specifically promote "Have Some Fun" as the Czech Eurovision entry. On 23 February and 1 March, Tereza Kerndlová performed "Have Some Fun" during the Ukrainian and Latvian Eurovision national finals, respectively. Between 18 and 21 April, Kerndlová completed promotional activities in Malta by appearing during the One TV programmes Show Time, Bla Agenda, and Trid Tarah, as well as the TVM talk show programmes Il-Leyla and Ħadd Għalik.

== At Eurovision ==
In September 2007, the competition's format was announced to be expanded to two semi-finals in 2008. According to the rules, all nations with the exceptions of the host country and the "Big Four" (France, Germany, Spain, and the United Kingdom) are required to qualify from one of two semi-finals in order to compete for the final; the top nine songs from each semi-final as determined by televoting progress to the final, and a tenth was determined by back-up juries. The European Broadcasting Union (EBU) split up the competing countries into six different pots based on voting patterns from previous contests, with countries with favourable voting histories put into the same pot. On 28 January 2008, a special allocation draw was held which placed each country into one of the two semi-finals. Czech Republic was placed into the second semi-final, to be held on 22 May 2008. The running order for the semi-finals was decided through another draw on 17 March 2008 and Czech Republic was set to perform in position 8, following the entry from Switzerland and before the entry from Belarus.

In the Czech Republic, the semi-finals and the final were broadcast on ČT1 and featured commentary by Kateřina Kristelová.

=== Semi-final ===
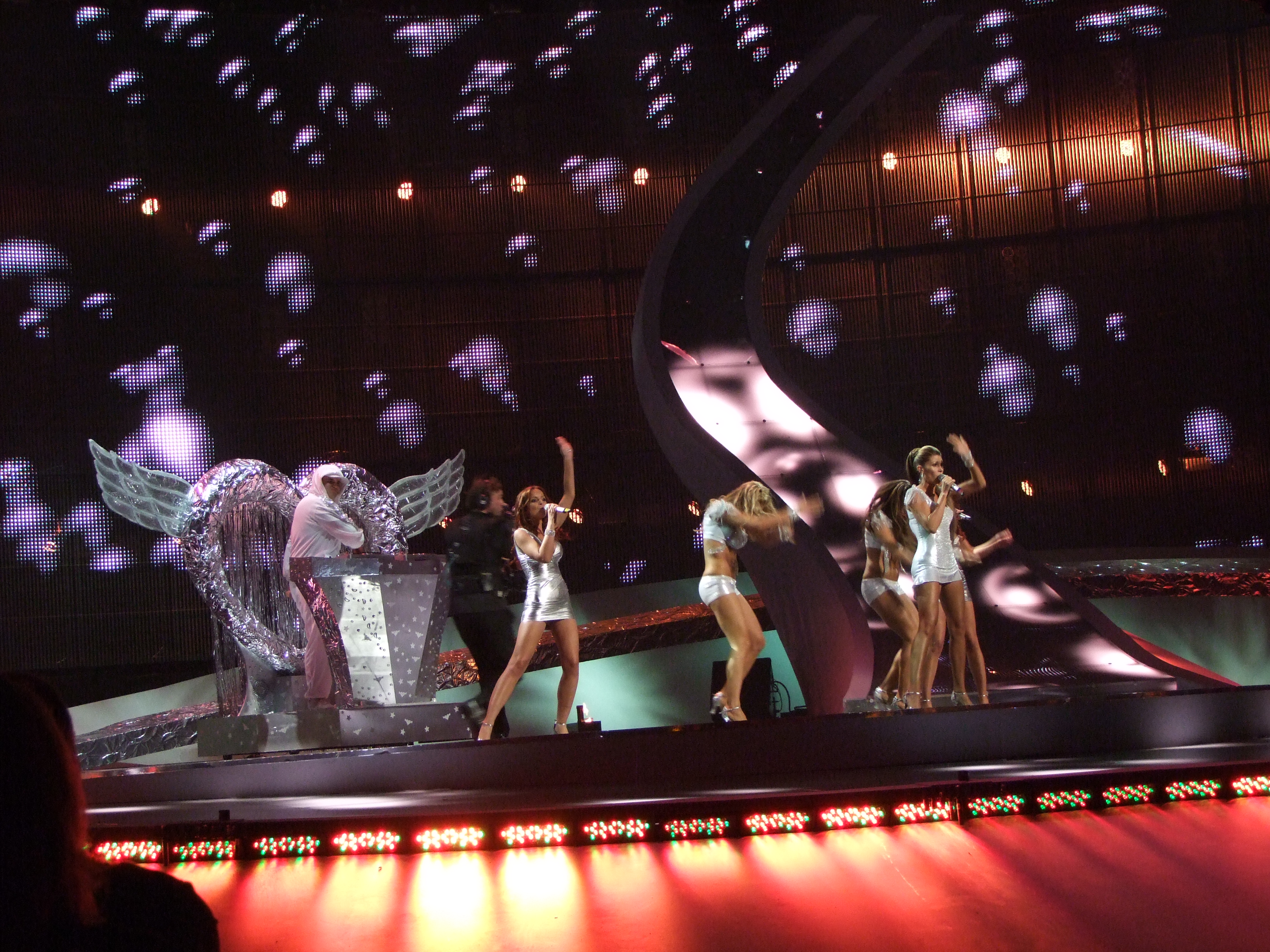
Tereza Kerndlová during a rehearsal before the second semi-final

Tereza Kerndlová took part in technical rehearsals on 13 and 17 May, followed by dress rehearsals on 21 and 22 May. The Czech performance featured Tereza Kerndlová appearing on stage wearing a short silver dress and performing a choreographed routine with four female dancers, two of them also provided backing vocals, as well as a male DJ in the background standing on a stage construction shaped as a silver heart with wings. The LED screens displayed moving yellow elements on a dark ground and the performance also featured pyrotechnic effects. The dancers and DJ performing with Kerndlová were: Adéla Blažková, Alena Langerová, Daniela Jančichová-Nízlová, Veronika Nízlová, and Jan Gajdoš.

At the end of the show, Czech Republic was not announced among the top 10 entries in the second semi-final and therefore failed to qualify to compete in the final. It was later revealed that Czech Republic placed 18th out of 19 in the semi-final, receiving a total of 9 points.

=== Voting ===
Below is a breakdown of points awarded to Czech Republic and awarded by Czech Republic in the second semi-final and grand final of the contest. The nation awarded its 12 points to Ukraine in the semi-final and to Armenia in the final of the contest.

==== Points awarded to the Czech Republic ====
Points awarded to the Czech Republic (Semi-final 2)
Score	Country
12 points	
10 points	
8 points	
7 points	
6 points	
5 points	Macedonia
4 points	
3 points	
2 points	Croatia
1 point	Malta; Turkey

==== Points awarded by the Czech Republic ====
Points awarded by the Czech Republic (Semi-final 2)
Score	Country
12 points	Ukraine
10 points	Denmark
8 points	Georgia
7 points	Portugal
6 points	Malta
5 points	Latvia
4 points	Macedonia
3 points	Croatia
2 points	Bulgaria
1 point	Albania

Points awarded by the Czech Republic (Final)
Score	Country
12 points	Armenia
10 points	Azerbaijan
8 points	Ukraine
7 points	Russia
6 points	Serbia
5 points	Greece
4 points	Georgia
3 points	Latvia
2 points	Denmark
1 point	Bosnia and Herzegovina
