= Martin Němec (musician) =

Czech rock musician and composer (born 1957)

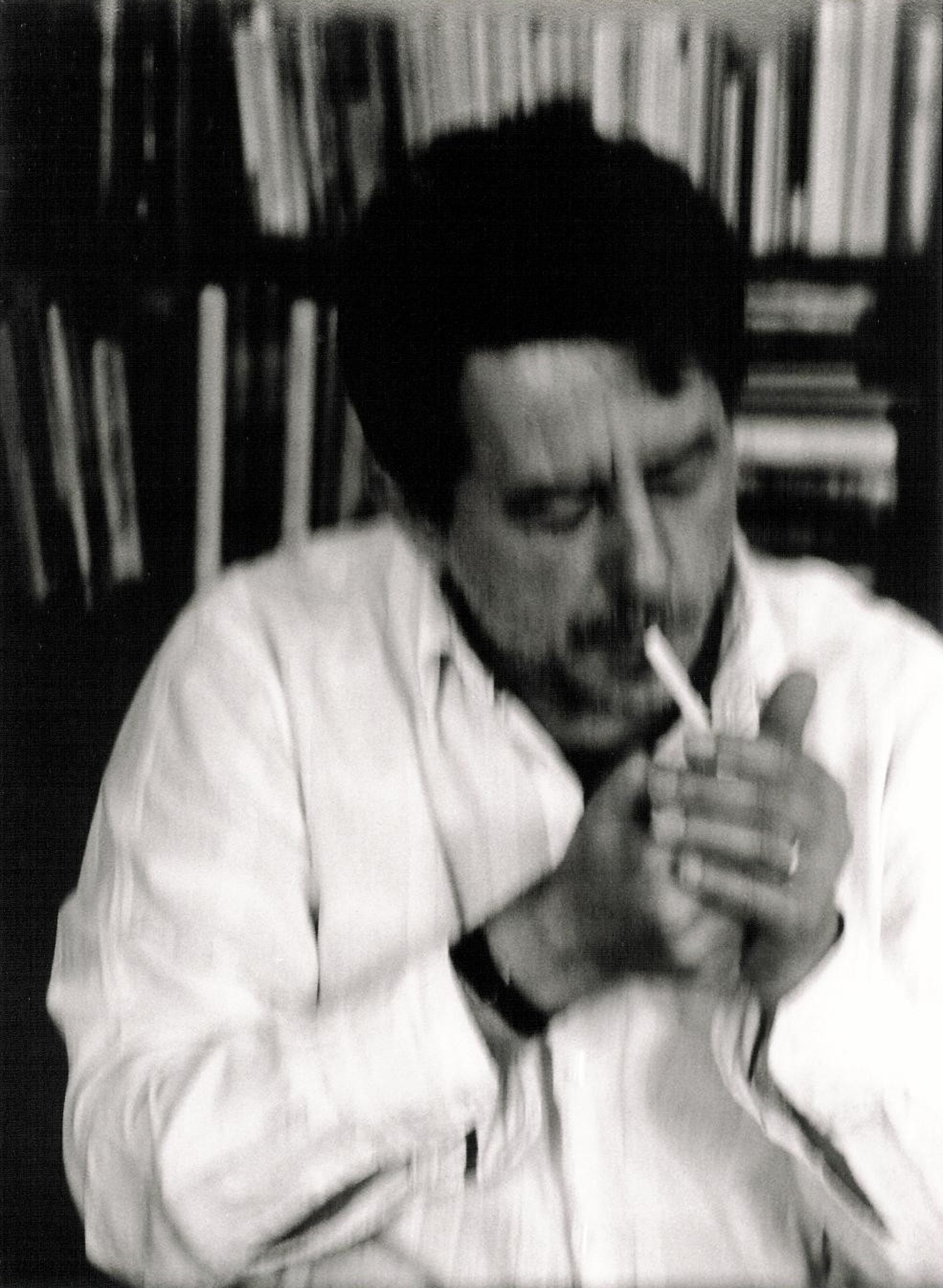
- Martin Němec by Tereza z Davle

Background information
- Birth name: Martin Němec
- Born: 16 June 1957 (age 67); Prague, Czechoslovakia
- Genres: Rock
- Occupation: Musician
- Instrument: Keyboards
- Years active: 1982–present
- Labels: m.art.in
- Website: nemecmartin.com

Martin Němec (born 16 June 1957) is a Czech rock musician and composer.

Between 1977 and 1983 he studied at Academy of Fine Arts, Prague. In 1982, he founded the band called Precedens together with singer-songwriter Jan Sahara Hedl. He is keyboardist and a leader of this group. Since 2002, he is member of Lili Marlene, which released two studio albums. He is also film score composer, screenwriter and painter. He is a son of Czech painter Josef Němec.
