= Kabát =

Czech rock band

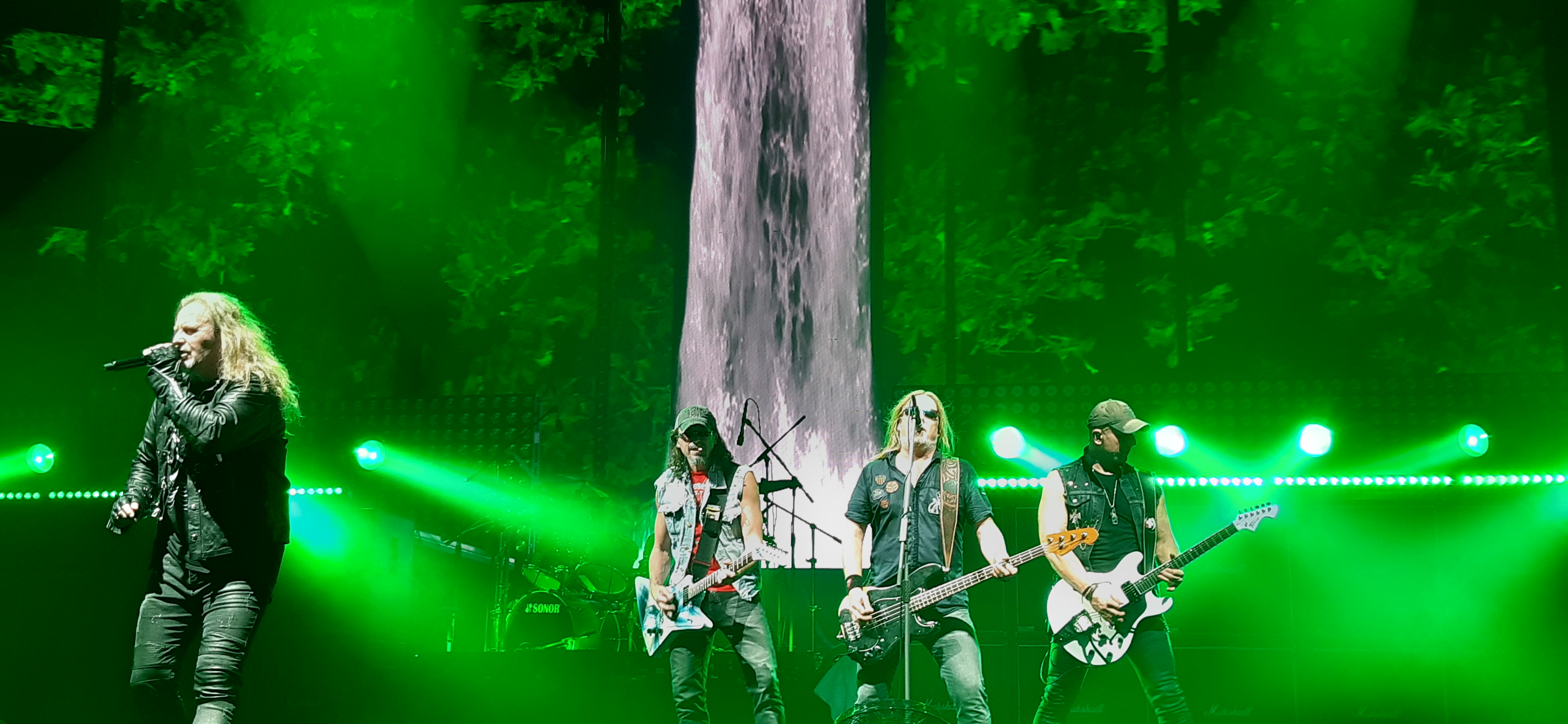
- Kabát performing in 2019

Background information
- Origin: Teplice, Czechoslovakia
- Genres: Hard rock; thrash metal
- Years active: 1983–1985; 1989–present
- Label: EMI
- Members: Josef Vojtek; Tomáš Krulich; Milan Špalek; Radek Hurčík; Ota Váňa
- Past members: Martin Uhřík; Jiří Bušek; René Horňák; Libor Šerl; Robert Stahl
- Website: kabat.cz

Kabát is a Czech hard rock band from Teplice formed in 1983. The members of the group are Josef Vojtek (lead vocals), Milan Špalek (bass guitar), Tomáš Krulich (guitar), Ota Váňa (guitar), and Radek Hurčík (drums). Kabát has enjoyed major popularity in their home country since 1989, and they are the holders of multiple Anděl Awards. The band represented the Czech Republic as the country's first entry in the Eurovision Song Contest in 2007 in Helsinki, Finland. Between 2003 and 2017, they won the Český slavík award twelve times. In 2014, they were inducted into the Beatová síň slávy, the Czech equivalent of the Rock and Roll Hall of Fame. They are considered one of the most successful rock acts in Czech history.

== History ==
=== Beginnings and first album (1983–91) ===
Kabát was formed as a thrash metal band in Teplice in 1983 by bass guitarist Milan Špalek and guitarist Tomáš Krulich. Drummer Radek "Hurvajs" Hurčík and singer Josef Vojtek joined the band soon after. The group went on a three-year hiatus in 1985 as some of its members had to perform military service. They reformed in 1989, this time with Jiří Bušek and René Horňák on guitars. The two didn't last long with Kabát and were replaced in 1990 by new guitarist Ota Váňa and the returning Tomáš Krulich. The band's lineup has remained the same to the present day.

Between 1989 and 1990, Kabát recorded the demo Orgazmus, which was never officially published, though the band distributed it among fans. In 1991, they issued their first studio album, Má jí motorovou. It went on to sell a total of 69,000 copies. This led to the band winning their first Anděl Award, in the Discovery of the Year category.

=== Děvky ty to znaj and Colorado (1992–94) ===
In 1992, Kabát issued the concert album Živě!, which was recorded at concerts in Brno and Břeclav. The following year, their second studio album, Děvky ty to znaj, was released. The album cover was drawn by former luger Petr Urban, to whom Kabát subsequently dedicated a song from the record. To promote the album, the band embarked on their first major tour, which included a show at Prague's Lucerna. The album sold a total of 85,000 copies.

In September 1994, Kabát put out their third record, Colorado, which was certified Gold in less than two weeks, for selling 25,000 units. By the end of November, the album had gone Platinum, for the sale of 50,000 units. This release helped Kabát get on Czech radio, paradoxically, with the bluegrass song "Colorado", which was originally intended only as a joke. Colorado sold a total of 96,000 copies.

=== Země plná trpaslíků, Čert na koze jel, and MegaHu (1995–99) ===
In the fall of 1995, Kabát released their fourth studio album, titled Země plná trpaslíků. Despite receiving mixed reviews, the record sold 82,000 copies. Vocalist Vojtek later said it was his least favourite album. To promote it, Kabát went on tour in 1996. Following this, the rockers returned to the studio to record their next album. This was released in 1997 under the title Čert na koze jel. It sold 72,000 copies and the band placed eleventh in that year's Český slavík poll. Kabát followed the release with another tour in 1998. In 1999, a new record was released, the band's sixth, titled MegaHu. A national tour followed the same year. The album sold 50,000 copies and Kabát placed ninth in the Český slavík poll, the first time they had made it into the top ten.

=== Go satane go and Suma sumárum (2000–02) ===
In November 2000, Kabát released the album Go satane go. They supported it with another tour. A year later, the band published their first retrospective, the 2-CD compilation Suma sumárum, which was intended to celebrate the tenth anniversary of their debut album. The first disc contained a list of their biggest hits and the second was a live recording of a concert from the previous year's Go satane go tour. The compilation sold over 130,000 copies, was certified six-times Platinum, and became the band's bestselling record. 2001 saw Kabát do another national tour, as well as their first major international foray, as they travelled to the United States to perform a number of shows.

Suma sumárum was followed in 2002 by a DVD release titled Suma sumárum - Best of video. The same year, Kabát placed third in the Český slavík poll.

=== Dole v dole (2003–05) ===
Kabát published their eighth studio album, Dole v dole, in October 2003. It went four-times Platinum, selling over 78,000 copies, and won the band their first Český slavík award, which they received at Prague's State Opera. The following year, Kabát won several Anděl Awards, in the categories Rock Album of the Year, Band of the Year, and Bestselling Title of the Year. Also in 2004, they released the DVD Kabát 2003-2004. This included several live recordings as well as a documentary of their 2004 tour. Kabát remained in first place in that year's Český slavík.

=== Corrida, Po čertech velkej koncert (2006–09) ===
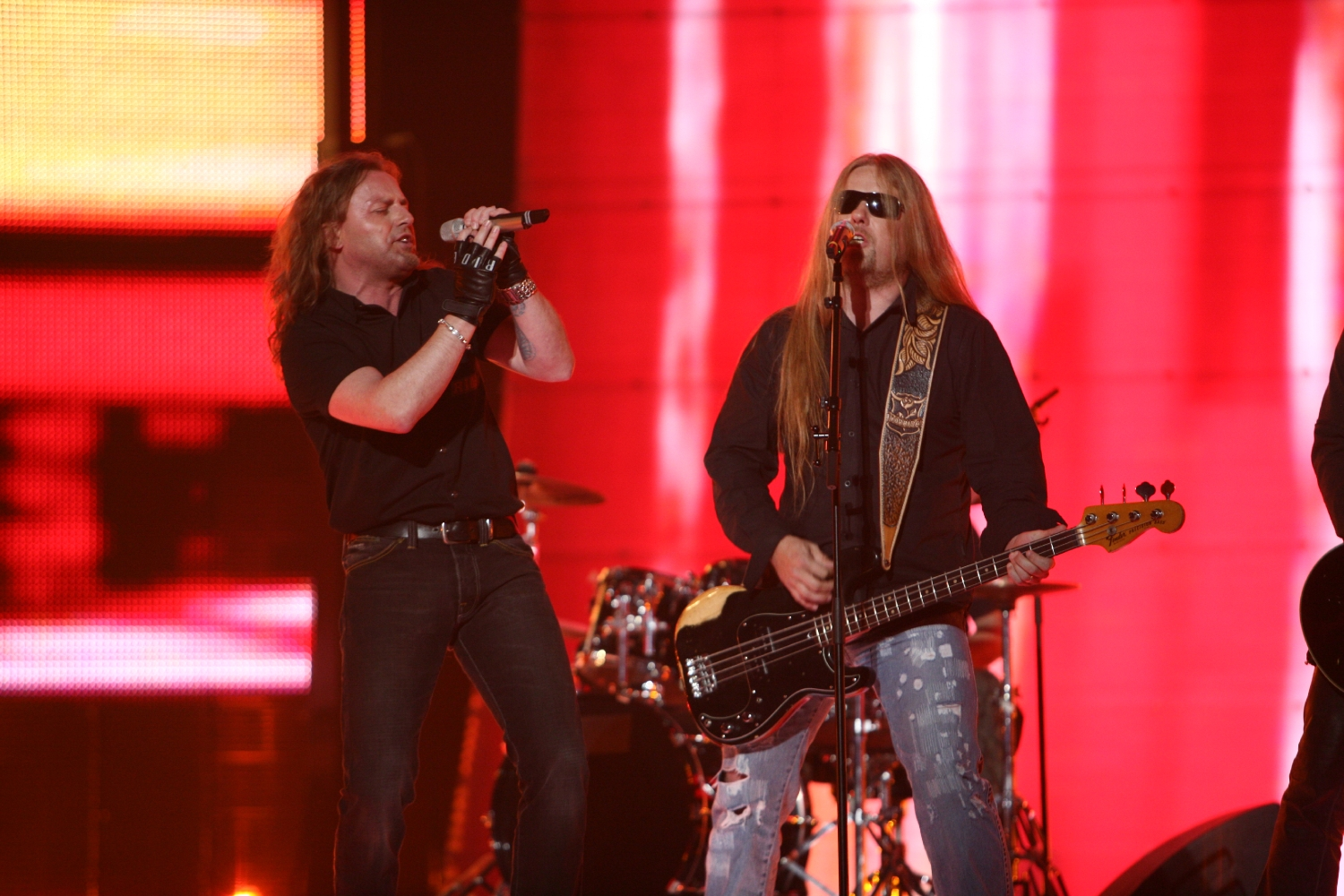
Kabát at the Eurovision Song Contest 2007

In the spring of 2006, Kabát began working on a new studio album. The record, named Corrida, was released in December. A spring 2007 tour followed. Corrida sold 45,000 units after only five days and was later certified triple Platinum. Kabát received another Anděl Award, this time for Bestselling Album. In 2007, the band won the Czech national final for the 2007 Eurovision Song Contest, which took place in Helsinki, Finland. They did not make it to the finals, finishing last in the semifinal. At the end of the year, Kabát won their third Český slavík as Band of the Year. In November 2008, the DVD Kabát – Corrida 2007 was released, containing a concert filmed in Prague, as well a documentary of the entire tour promoting the band's latest album. Kabát won the Český slavík once more, claiming their fourth victory. In 2009, to celebrate twenty years in the same lineup, Kabát planned their biggest open-air concert to date, one that would rival international performances. Plans for a new album were shelved and instead, all efforts were poured into the concert, which was titled Po čertech velkej koncert. The event took place on 12 September in Prague. A recording of the concert was later released as a two-disc DVD, under the name Po čertech velkej koncert.

At the end of the year, Kabát defeated Chinaski for first place in the Český slavík poll, scoring their fifth win.

=== Banditi di Praga and brass band tour (2010–13) ===
In November 2010, Kabát won the Český slavík once more, and released a new album a month later. Titled Banditi di Praga, it was certified Diamond and became the bestselling album of the year. The band toured again the next year, and subsequently released a DVD documenting their performances, titled Banditi di Praga Turné 2011. The release was certified triple-Platinum, and Kabát won their seventh Český slavík that year, as well as an Anděl for bestselling album.

In 2013, the rockers announced they would tour with a brass band, which, according to them, they had been secretly planning for almost four years. Due to the technical complexity of the feat, the tour made only six stops in the Czech Republic and three in Slovakia. The tour, titled Banditi di Praga po 30 letech, was conceived in the style of the 1930s, and the clubs where the band played were decorated accordingly. The brass band would join Kabát halfway through each concert, together with dancers.

At the end of the year, Kabát finished second in the Český slavík poll, losing first place to Kryštof, and interrupting a streak of six victories.

=== Po čertech velkej koncert II, Do pekla/do nebe (2014–18) ===
In September 2014, Kabát staged another massive concert in Prague to celebrate their 25th anniversary. Titled Po čertech velkej koncert II, the show was opened by Hlas Česko Slovenska 2014 winner Lenka "Lo" Hrůzová, followed by Danish rock band D-A-D. The performance was recorded and later released on DVD. At the end of the year, Kabát won first place in the Český slavík poll once more.

In May 2015, the long-delayed album Do pekla/do nebe was released, and was eventually certified five-times Platinum. The band followed it with a tour of the Czech Republic and Slovakia and won their tenth Český slavík that year. In 2016, the rockers released the compilation album Kabát 2013–2015, which included the recording of a performance they held at Prague's O2 Arena as part of their big band tour in 2013. At the end of November, they received their eleventh Český slavík.

2017 saw the band score another victory at the Český slavík poll. They decided to return the award, however, as they claimed that it should have rightfully gone to Ortel, a controversial group who were ranked in second place. After receiving pressure from Kabát and other musicians, including Michal David, Mattoni, the organizer of the event, agreed to a vote recount. In the end, Kabát were shown to have received 5,000 more votes than Ortel.

=== Po čertech velký turné, COVID-19 pandemic (2019–present) ===
In 2019, to celebrate their thirtieth anniversary, Kabát organized the Po čertech velký turné tour. During the Prague concert, with the support of over thirty thousand fans, they saluted songster Karel Gott and congratulated him on his 80th birthday. They also announced that they were working on new material for their next album.

Recording proceeded until March 2020, when studios had to be closed due to the COVID-19 pandemic. In June they announced that they would be postponing their planned tour until 2021.

== Musical style ==
Although Kabát was originally founded as a thrash metal band, this style lasted only until the release of their debut album, Má jí motorovou. Subsequently, they gradually adopted a sound approaching hard rock. Their lyrics originally included profanity, sexual themes, and glorification of drunkenness, but this began to change after the release of their third album, Colorado. The texts to their songs took on a more humorous slant, and they often sang about political or social topics in the Czech Republic and the world.

== Band members ==
Current

- Josef Vojtek – vocals, harmonica (1983–present)
- Tomáš Krulich – rhythm guitar, backing vocals (1983–present)
- Milan Špalek – bass, backing vocals (1983–present)
- Ota Váňa – lead guitar, backing vocals (1990–present)
- Radek "Hurvajs" Hurčík – drums, backing vocals (1986–present)

Past

- Jiří Bušek – guitar
- René Horňák – guitar
- Martin "Máca" Uhřík – guitar
- Libor Šerl – bass
- Robert Stahl – drums

== Discography ==
=== Studio albums ===
- Má jí motorovou (1991)
- Děvky ty to znaj (1993)
- Colorado (1994)
- Země plná trpaslíků (1995)
- Čert na koze jel (1997)
- MegaHu (1999)
- Go satane go (2000)
- Dole v dole (2003)
- Corrida (2006)
- Banditi di Praga (2010)
- Do pekla/Do nebe (2015)
- El Presidento (2022)

=== Live albums ===
- Živě! (1992)
- Po čertech velkej koncert (2CD, 2009)
- Banditi di Praga Turné 2011 (2CD, 2011)

=== Compilations ===
- Suma sumárum (2CD, 2001)
- Box 2007 (8CD, 2007)
- Suma sumárum - Best of (25. výročí) (2CD+DVD, 2013)

=== DVDs ===
- Best of video koncert (Praha GSG Tour) (VHS/DVD, 2002)
- Kabát 2003-2004 (2DVD, 2004)
- Corrida Turné 2007 (DVD, 2008)
- Po čertech velkej koncert (2DVD/Blu-ray, 2009)
- Banditi di Praga Turné 2011 (2DVD, 2011)
- Kabát 2013-2015 (2016)

== Selected awards and nominations ==
- Český slavík – Band of the year – 3rd place (2002)
- Anděl Awards – Band of the year; Album of the year – Dole v dole (2003)
- Český slavík – Band of the year (2003)
- Český slavík – Band of the year (2004)
- Český slavík – Band of the year – 2nd place (2005)
- Český slavík – Band of the year – 2nd place (2006)
- Eurovision Song Contest 2007 – winning Czech entry (2007)
- Anděl Awards – Bestselling album of the year – Corrida (2007)
- Český slavík – Band of the year (2007)
- Český slavík – Band of the year (2008)
- Český slavík – Band of the year (2009)
- Český slavík – Band of the year (2010)
- Anděl Awards – Bestselling album of the year – Banditi di Praga (2011)
- Český slavík – Band of the year (2011)
- Český slavík – Band of the year (2012)
- Český slavík – Band of the year – 2nd place (2013)
- Český slavík – Band of the year (2014)
- Český slavík – Band of the year (2015)
- Český slavík – Band of the year (2016)
- Český slavík – Band of the year (2017)
- Český slavík – Band of the year (2022)
- Český slavík – Band of the year (2023)
- Český slavík – Band of the year (2024)
- Český slavík – Band of the year (2025)

Awards and achievements
Preceded by None (first time entry)	Czech Republic in the Eurovision Song Contest; 2007	Succeeded by Tereza Kerndlová with "Have Some Fun'"
