= Czech Republic in the Eurovision Song Contest 2007 =

- Eurovision Song Contest 2007
- Participating broadcaster: Česká televize (ČT)
- Country: Czech Republic
- Selection process: Eurosong 2007
- Selection date: 10 March 2007

Competing entry
- Song: "Malá dáma"
- Artist: Kabát
- Songwriters: Milan Špalek; Ota Váňa; Josef Vojtek; Radek Hurčík; Tomáš Krulich

Placement
- Semi-final result: Failed to qualify (28th)

Participation chronology

The Czech Republic was represented at the Eurovision Song Contest 2007 with the song "Malá dáma", written by Milan Špalek, Ota Váňa, Josef Vojtek, Radek Hurčík, and Tomáš Krulich, and performed by the band Kabát. The Czech participating broadcaster, Česká televize (ČT), organised the national final Eurosong 2007 in order to select its entry for the contest. This was the first-ever entry from the Czech Republic in the Eurovision Song Contest, and the first-ever entry performed in Czech in the contest.

Nine entries competed in the national final which took place on 10 March 2007 and "Malá dáma" performed by Kabát was selected as the winner entirely by a public vote.

Czech Republic competed in the second semi-final of the Eurovision Song Contest which took place on 10 May 2007. Performing during the show in position 16, "Malá dáma" was not announced among the top 10 entries of the semi-final and therefore did not qualify to compete in the final. It was later revealed that the Czech Republic placed twenty-eighth (last) out of the 28 participating countries in the semi-final with 1 point.

== Background ==
On 14 April 2006, the Czech national broadcaster, Česká televize (ČT), confirmed its intentions to debut at the Eurovision Song Contest in its 2007 edition. ČT had previously planned to debut at the contest in 1993 and 2005; the latter year it withdrew its application due to financial problems. In July 2006, the broadcaster confirmed that its entry for the 2007 contest would be selected through a national final.

== Before Eurovision ==
=== Eurosong 2007 ===
Eurosong 2007 was the national final organised by ČT in order to select its entry for the Eurovision Song Contest 2007. Nine entries participated in the competition which took place on 10 March 2007 at the Veletržní Palác in Prague, hosted by Jirí Korn and Katerina Kristelová with the winner selected exclusively via a public televote. The show was broadcast on ČT1 as well as streamed online via the broadcaster's website ceskatelevize.cz. The national final was also broadcast via radio on ČRo 1 - Radiožurnál with commentary by Martin Hrdinka. The national final was watched by 819,000 viewers in the Czech Republic with a market share of 23%.

==== Competing entries ====
ČT together with a four-member jury consisting of director Libor Kodad, producer Viktor Průša, Czech Head of Delegation for the Eurovision Song Contest Radim Smetana and screenwriter Ivan Hubač selected ten entries for the national final, which were presented to the public on 14 February 2007 during a press conference broadcast on ČT24. Seven of the entries were selected based on their recent success on the IFPI Radio 50 chart, while the remaining three entries were submitted by artists selected based on Czech music polls. Among artists that were approached by ČT but declined to participate were singers Aneta Langerová, Anna K, Lucie Vondráčková and Richard Krajčo as well as the group Kryštof.

On 16 February 2007, ČT announced that Kabát would perform the song "Malá dáma" instead of "Burlaci", while L.B.P. would perform the song "Story of Life" instead of "So Real". On 27 February 2007, the broadcaster announced that Helena Vondráčková would perform the song "Ha Ha Ha" instead of "Samba", the latter of which was disqualified due to the song having been commercially released before 1 October 2006; the singer ultimately withdrew from the national final due to disagreements with the voting process.

==== Final ====
The final took place on 10 March 2007. Nine entries competed and the winner, "Malá dáma" performed by Kabát, was determined entirely by a public televote via SMS held between 23 February and 10 March 2007. In addition to the performances of the competing entries, the show was opened by the group Hamleti.

R/O	Artist	Song	Songwriter(s)	Televote	Place
1	Vlasta Horváth	"Adios"	Vlastimil Horváth, Viktor Dyk	—	—
2	L.B.P.	"Story of Life"	Petr Chmela, Roman Steffl, Steven Cann	15,907	4
3	Petr Kolář	"Přísahám"	Karel Svoboda, Frantisek Moravec	—	—
4	Lili Marlene	"Žena ze stínadel"	Martin Němec	—	—
5	Gipsy.cz	"Muloland"	Radoslav Banga	25,257	2
6	Petr Bende	"Zaklínám své moře"	Petr Bende	—	—
7	Helena Zeťová	"Love Me Again"	Andrew Fromm, Bryan Todd	12,538	5
8	Sámer Issa	"When I Am With Her"	Zdeněk Krejčíř	16,233	3
9	Kabát	"Malá dáma"	Milan Špalek, Ota Váňa, Josef Vojtek, Radek Hurčík, Tomáš Krulich	28,343	1

== At Eurovision ==
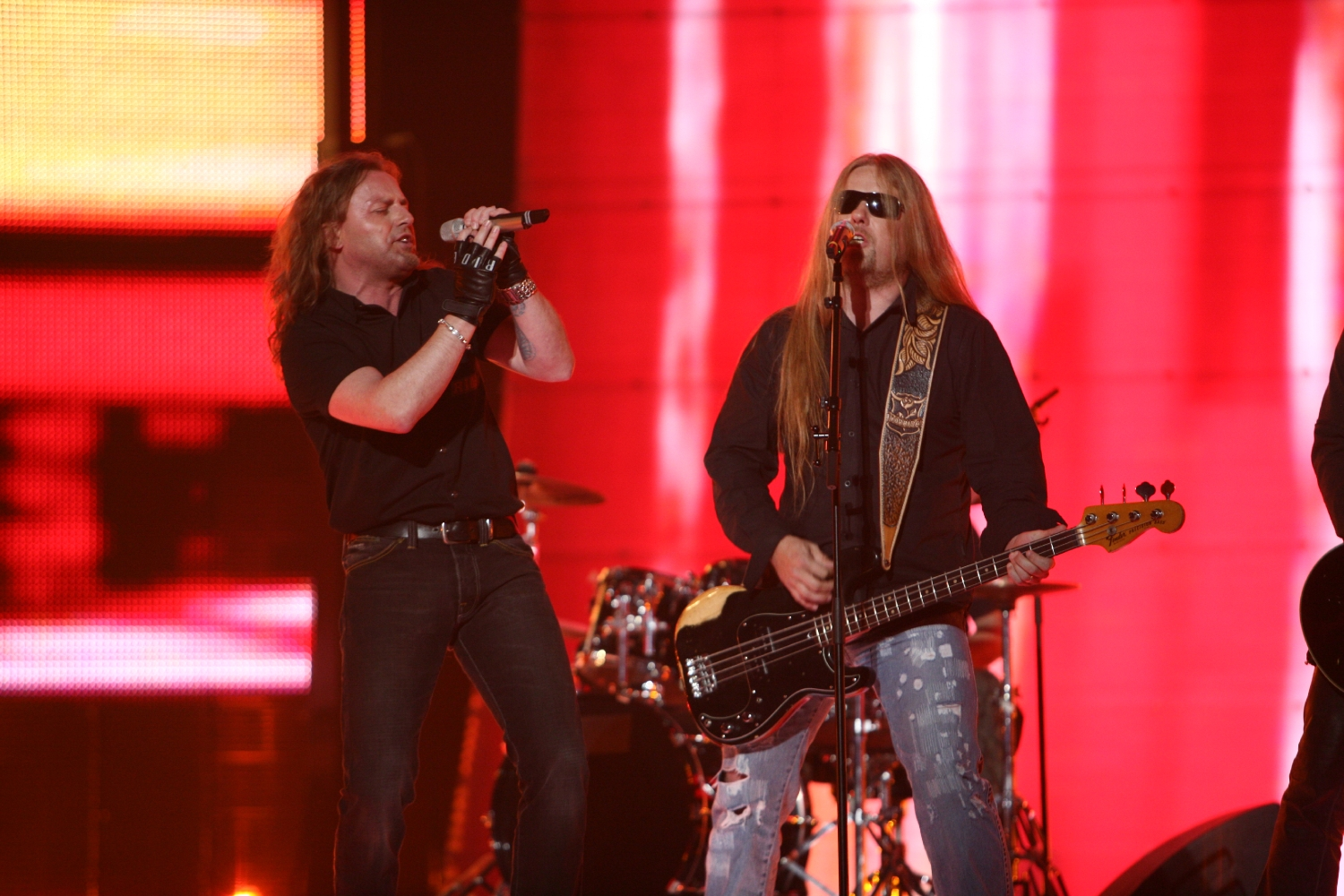
Kabát performing at the Eurovision Song Contest

According to Eurovision rules, all nations with the exceptions of the host country, the "Big Four" (France, Germany, Spain and the United Kingdom) and the ten highest placed finishers in the 2006 contest are required to qualify from the semi-final on 10 May 2007 in order to compete for the final on 12 May 2007. On 12 March 2007, a special allocation draw was held which determined the running order for the semi-final and the Czech Republic was set to perform in position 16, following the entry from Serbia and before the entry from Portugal.

The semi-final and the final were broadcast in the Czech Republic on ČT1. Both shows featured commentary by Kateřina Kristelová, who was joined by Josef Vojtek for the final. ČT appointed Andrea Savane as its spokesperson to announce the Czech votes during the final.

=== Semi-final ===
Kabát took part in technical rehearsals on 4 and 6 May, followed by dress rehearsals on 9 and 10 May. The Czech performance featured the members of Kabát appearing on stage in a band set-up wearing jeans and black tops, performing in front of the LED screens that displayed red and yellow lights creating a crucifix effect. Before the semi-final, the band stated that "the fact his band play hard rock could work against them in the Eurovision."

At the end of the show, the Czech Republic was not announced among the top 10 entries in the semi-final and therefore failed to qualify to compete in the final. It was later revealed that Czech Republic placed twenty-eighth (last) in the semi-final, receiving a total of 1 point. Following the contest, Kabát stated that they were unfamiliar with the nature of Eurovision prior to their participation after which lead singer Josef Vojtek would contend that "a rock group is not a good idea for the particular event".

=== Voting ===
Below is a breakdown of points awarded to the Czech Republic and awarded by the Czech Republic in the semi-final and grand final of the contest. The nation awarded its 12 points to Serbia in the semi-final and to Ukraine in the final of the contest.

==== Points awarded to the Czech Republic ====
Points awarded to the Czech Republic (Semi-final)
Score	Country
12 points	
10 points	
8 points	
7 points	
6 points	
5 points	
4 points	
3 points	
2 points	
1 point	Estonia

==== Points awarded by the Czech Republic ====
Points awarded by the Czech Republic (Semi-final)
Score	Country
12 points	Serbia
10 points	Bulgaria
8 points	Hungary
7 points	Andorra
6 points	Macedonia
5 points	Belarus
4 points	Slovenia
3 points	Latvia
2 points	Israel
1 point	Turkey

Points awarded by the Czech Republic (Final)
Score	Country
12 points	Ukraine
10 points	Armenia
8 points	Serbia
7 points	Bulgaria
6 points	Russia
5 points	Macedonia
4 points	Bosnia and Herzegovina
3 points	Greece
2 points	Belarus
1 point	Georgia
