= Tvoje tvář má známý hlas =

Czech reality singing television show

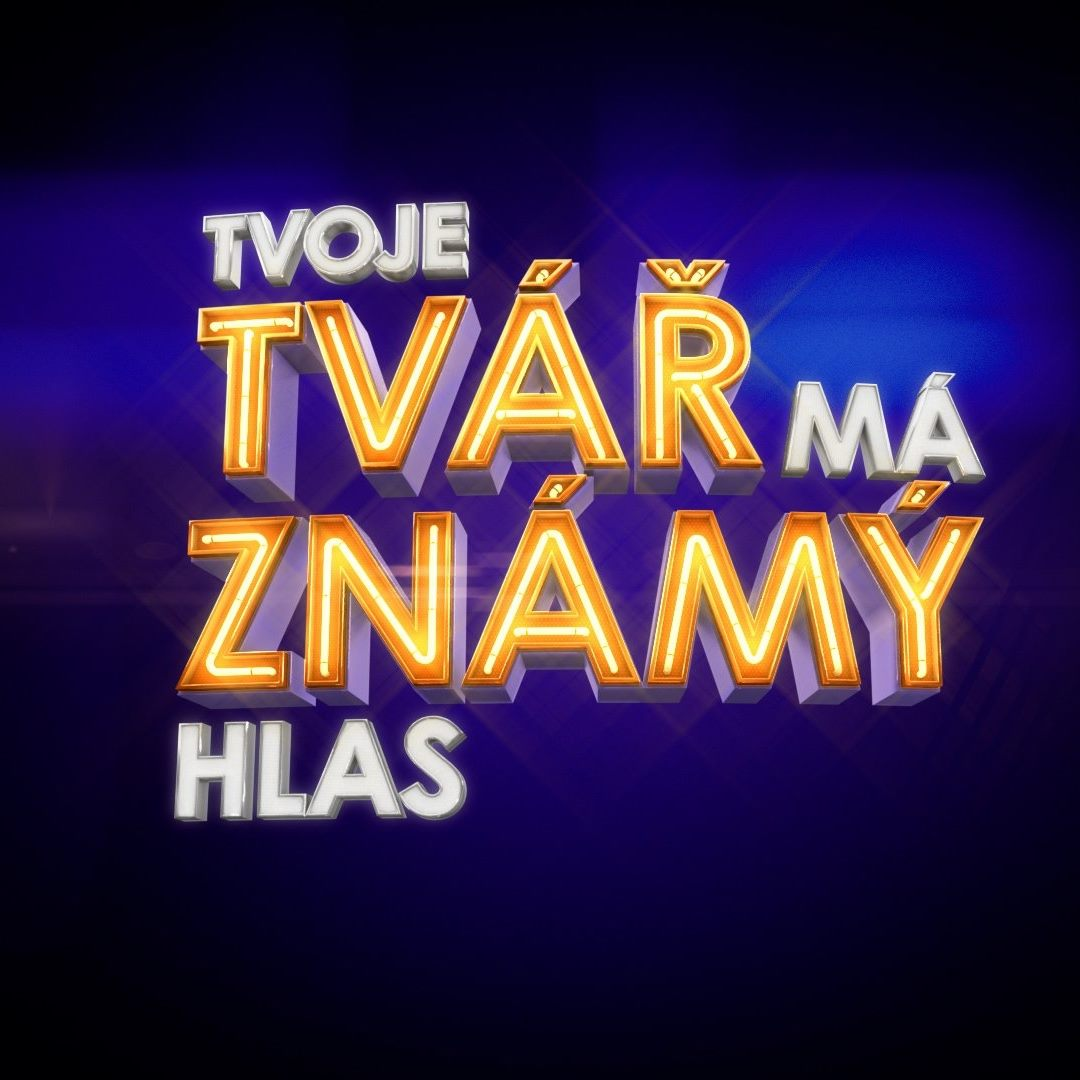
- Genre: Reality competition
- Based on: Your Face Sounds Familiar
- Presented by: Ondřej Sokol (1–6, 8–); Aleš Háma (8–); Vladimír Polívka (7)
- Judges: Jakub Kohák (1–6, 8–); Eva Burešová (7–); Petra Nesvačilová (9–); Daniel Dangl (9–); Marek Lambora (8); Ondřej Sokol (7); Aleš Háma (4–7); Janek Ledecký (1–6); Iva Pazderková (2–3); Jitka Čvančarová (1)
- Country of origin: Czech Republic
- Original language: Czech
- No. of seasons: 9
- No. of episodes: 110 (including 8 special episodes)

Production
- Camera setup: Multiple camera
- Production company: Endemol

Original release
- Network: Nova, VOYO
- Release: March 26, 2016 – present

Related
- Tvoja tvár znie povedome

Tvoje tvář má známý hlas is a Czech reality singing series that is aired on Nova. It is both based on the Endemol format Your Face Sounds Familiar and an adaptation of the Spanish Tu cara me suena. The show was first broadcast on March 26, 2016, and is still aired. The show involves eight or ten celebrities (singers, actors and television personalities) portraying various iconic singers each week to win 25,000 CZK for their chosen charity.

== Format ==
The show challenges celebrities to perform as different iconic music artists every week, which are chosen by the show's "Randomiser". They are then judged by the panel of celebrity judges.

Each celebrity becomes transformed into a different singer each week, and performs an iconic song and dance routine well known by that particular singer. The 'randomiser' can choose any older or younger artist available in the machine, or even a singer of the opposite sex, or a deceased singer. Celebrity is transformed to look a like well known Singer.

The contestants are awarded points from the judges based on their singing and dance routines. After the jury vote, the contestants have to give a set of points to a fellow contestant of their choice. The total score of each contestant is counted by summing the points from judges and contestant's voting. In case of a tie, the judges will choose the weeks winner. If a contestant shares last place with another contestant, only one came last that week – except for the special week of duets.

Whoever is at the top of the leaderboard at the end of the each show receives a cash prize for a charity of their choice and a further grand prize for the "series champion".

=== Voting ===
The contestants are awarded points from the judges (and each other) based on their singing and dance routines. The points go from 1 to 8, with 8 being the judge's favorite of the night. From the eighth season, the points go from 1 to 10 due to ten contestants. After that, each contestant gives 5 points to a fellow contestant of their choice (known as "Bonus" points). The judges' score is combined with the "Bonus" points.

== Cast ==
=== Presenter ===
Ondřej Sokol as presenter on every episode from the first season to the sixth. Ondřej Sokol was replaced by Vladimír Polívka in the seventh season. He was replaced again in the eighth season by Ondřej Sokol and also by Aleš Háma.

=== Judges ===
Jakub Kohák, Jitka Čvančarová and Janek Ledecký as judges on every episode, while the fourth judge varies with each episode. In the second season, Jitka Čvančarová was replaced with Iva Pazderková. She was replaced by Aleš Háma in the fourth season. Jakub Kohák and Janek Ledecký were replaced in the seventh season by Ondřej Sokol and Eva Burešová. In the eighth season, Ondřej Sokol was replaced with Jakub Kohák and Aleš Háma was replaced with Marek Lambora. Daniel Dangl replaced Marek Lambora in the ninth season. In this season, there was no special judge each episode, as there were four permanent judges.

Key

Judge
Presenter
Contestant

Name	Season								
Name	1	2	3	4	5	6	7	8	9
Jakub Kohák									
Eva Burešová									
Petra Nesvačilová									
Daniel Dangl									
Ondřej Sokol									
Aleš Háma									
Marek Lambora									
Vladimír Polívka									
Janek Ledecký									
Iva Pazderková									
Jitka Čvančarová									

=== Coaches ===
==== Vocal Coach ====
Czech singer and teacher of music Linda Finková is a vocal coach since the first season. She teaches the contestants in vocals.

==== Dance Coach ====
From the first season to the sixth, was the main dance company Dance Academy Prague with Yemi A.D. and Angeé Svobodová. They were replaced by Miňo Kereš and Zizoe in the seventh season. Miňo Kereš is also a choreographer for the Slovak version Tvoja tvár znie povedome. These programs were more connected in the year 2021. They had the same dance crew and logo.

==== Drama Coach ====
Drama Coach teaches contestants how to change into the singer's personality. In the first season it was Jiří Vejdělek, famous Czech director. He was replaced with Iva Pazderková. She was the couch in the second and third seasons. The drama coach in the fourth season was Martin Dejdar. He was replaced by Aleš Háma in the fifth season. In the sixth season, Aleš Háma was replaced by Patrik Děrgel. The drama coach in the seventh season was Jan Cina. He was replaced in the eighth season by Jitka Čvančarová. Dalibor Gondík and Adéla Gondíková were the new drama coaches in the ninth season.

Key

Vocal
Dance
Drama

Contestant
Guest judge

Name	Season								
Name	1	2	3	4	5	6	7	8	9
Linda Finková									
Miňo Kereš									
Adéla Gondíková									
Dalibor Gondík									
Zizoe									
Jitka Čvančarová									
Jan Cina									
Yemi A.D.									
Patrik Děrgel									
Angeé Svobodová									
Aleš Háma									
Martin Dejdar									
Iva Pazderková									
Jiří Vejdělek									

=== Special episodes ===
These episodes are presented by Ondřej Sokol and Aleš Háma. Together with them, we can look behind the scenes of the show and see the place where the contestants are training. They invite former contestants or special guests and talk with them about the transformations in the show. Other episodes have their own story, where both presenters are police officers, or they are on a sinking ship, in their caravan, or they are imprisoned and have to escape from prison. In between these fun moments, we look back at all the contestant's best performances from all seasons.

== Series overview ==
Season	Broadcast dates	No. of stars	No. of weeks	Celebrity honor places			
Season	Broadcast dates	No. of stars	No. of weeks	Winner	Second place	Third place	Fourth place
1) Spring 2016	March 26 – June 11, 2016	8	10	Hana Holišová	Ivana Chýlková	David Kraus	Iva Pazderková
2) Fall 2016	September 4 – November 20, 2016	8	12	Jan Cina	David Gránský	Marta Jandová	Anna Slováčková
3) Spring 2017	February 26 – May 14, 2017	8	12	Tatiana Vilhelmová	Milan Peroutka	Markéta Konvičková	Martha Issová
4) Fall 2017	September 2 – November 18, 2017	8	12	Berenika Kohoutová	Jitka Boho	Jan Kopečný	Aneta Krejčíková
5) Fall 2018	September 1 – November 17, 2018	8	12	Michaela Badinková	Eva Burešová	Patrik Děrgel	Tereza Mašková
6) Fall 2019	September 7 – November 23, 2019	8	12	Marek Lambora	Kateřina Marie Fialová	Roman Zach	Debbi
7) Fall 2020	September 5 – November 21, 2020	8	12	Jitka Čvančarová	Albert Černý	Erika Stárková	Bára Basiková
8) Spring 2021	March 21 – May 23, 2021	10	10	David Gránský	Hana Holišová	Albert Černý	Marta Jandová
9) Spring 2022	February 27 – May 1, 2022	8	10	Václav Kopta	Iva Kubelková	Monika Absolonová	Nikita Machytková

=== Season 1 (2016) ===
The first season premiered on March 26, 2016. The contestants were four women and four men:

- Ivana Chýlková, Iva Pazderková, Anna Fialová, Hana Holišová
- Petr Vondráček, David Kraus, Adam Mišík, Petr Rychlý

=== Season 2 (2016) ===
The second season premiered on September 4, 2016. The contestants were four women and four men:

- Anna Slováčková, Marta Jandová, Ivana Jirešová, Markéta Procházková
- David Gránský, Jan Cina, Miroslav Etzler, Roman Vojtek

=== Season 3 (2017) ===
The third season premiered on February 26, 2017. The contestants were four women and four men:

- Markéta Konvičková, Martha Issová, Adéla Gondíková, Tatiana Vilhelmová
- Aleš Háma, Milan Peroutka, Martin Dejdar, Ondřej Ruml

=== Season 4 (2017) ===
The fourth season premiered on September 2, 2017. The contestants were four women and four men:

- Jitka Boho, Berenika Kohoutová, Leona Machálková, Aneta Krejčíková
- Jan Kopečný, Tomáš Matonoha, Dalibor Gondík, Jan Maxián

=== Season 5 (2018) ===
The fifth season premiered on September 1, 2018. The contestants were four women and four men:

- Michaela Badinková, Eva Burešová, Jitka Schneiderová, Tereza Mašková
- Robert Jašków, Patrik Děrgel, Jan Révai, Vojtěch Drahokoupil

=== Season 6 (2019) ===
The sixth season premiered on September 7, 2019. The contestants were four women and four men:

- Kateřina Marie Fialová, Debbi, Kateřina Brožová, Zuzana Norisová
- Roman Zach, Ján Jackuliak, Marek Lambora, Robert Urban

=== Season 7 (2020) ===
The seventh season premiered on September 5, 2020. The contestants were four women and four men:

- Erika Stárková, Bára Basiková, Jitka Čvančarová, Andrea Kalousová
- Albert Černý, Martin Schreiner, Jordan Haj, Bořek Slezáček

=== Season 8 (2021) ===
The eighth season premiered on March 21, 2021. The contestants were five women and five men:

- Marta Jandová, Berenika Kohoutová, Hana Holišová, Jitka Boho, Iva Pazderková
- Petr Rychlý, David Gránský, Albert Černý, Vojtěch Drahokoupil, Roman Vojtek

=== Season 9 (2022) ===
The ninth season premiered on February 27, 2022. The contestants were four women and four men:

- Monika Absolonová, Denisa Nesvačilová, Iva Kubelková, Nikita Machytková
- Václav Kopta, Martin Carev, Saša Rašilov, Denis Šafařík

== Season 1 ==
This season was announced in the year 2016 and started on March 26, 2016. In this Season, Ondřej Sokol was the presenter. The Judges were Jakub Kohák, Jitka Čvančarová, Janek Ledecký and a special guest such as Barbora Poláková, Václav Kopta, Milan Šteindler, Monika Absolonová or Lukáš Pavlásek. Jiří Vejdělek was the drama coach. Linda Finková was the vocal coach. Yemi A.D. and Angeé Svobodová were the choreographers. The winner of the First Season was Hana Holišová.

=== Contestants ===
Celebrity	Known for	Episodes won	Episodes lost	Result
Hana Holišová	Actress	1st, 9th, Final	5th	Winner
Ivana Chýlková	Actress	5th	—	2nd place
David Kraus	Singer	7th	—	3rd place
Iva Pazderková	Actress	4th, 6th	8th	4th place
Anna Fialová	Actress	—	1st	5th place
Petr Rychlý	Actor	2nd, 8th	9th	6th place
Petr Vondráček	Presenter	—	2nd, 3rd	7th place
Adam Mišík	Singer	3rd	4th, 6th, 7th	8th place

=== Performances ===
Contestant	Week 1	Week 2	Week 3	Week 4	Week 5	Week 6	Week 7	Week 8	Week 9	Final
Hana Holišová	Édith Piaf	Beyoncé	Katy Perry	Michael Jackson	Hana Zagorová	MC Hammer	Shania Twain	Aretha Franklin	Catherine Zeta-Jones	John Travolta
Ivana Chýlková	Amy Winehouse	Madonna	PSY	Cher	Conchita Wurst	Fergie	Jens Sylsjö; Rednex	Liza Minnelli	Věra Bílá	Yvonne Přenosilová
David Kraus	Freddie Mercury; Queen	Adele	Tom Jones	Steven Tyler; Aerosmith	Ricky Martin	John Lennon	Till Lindemann; Rammstein	Janis Joplin	Waldemar Matuška	David Bowie
Iva Pazderková	Lady Gaga	Zdena Studenková	Toni Braxton	Susan Boyle	Kurt Cobain; Nirvana	Pink	Nicki Minaj	Shakira	Pharrell Williams	Gloria Gaynor
Anna Fialová	Britney Spears	Bruno Mars	Christina Aguilera	Jim Carrey	Cyndi Lauper	Whitney Houston	Jennifer Lopez	Vojtěch Dyk; Nightwork	Sia	Jennifer Grey
Petr Rychlý	Daniel Nekonečný	Louis Armstrong	Antonio Banderas	Jan Nedvěd	Victor Willis; Village People	Josef Vojtek; Kabát	Elton John	Hana Hegerová	Andrea Bocelli	Petr Janda; Olympic
Petr Vondráček	Tina Turner	Robbie Williams	Miroslav Žbirka	George Michael; Wham!	James Brown	Boy George; Culture Club	Bryan Adams	Roy Orbison	Lenny Kravitz	Patrick Swayze
Adam Mišík	Robin Thicke	Elvis Presley	Miley Cyrus	Adam Levine; Maroon 5	Prince	Lou Bega	Janek Ledecký	Stevie Wonder	Karel Gott	Petra Janů

Color key:

indicates the contestant came first that week
indicates the contestant came last that week
indicates the contestant did not score
indicates the contestant was eliminated

=== Results summary ===
Contestant	Week 1	Week 2	Week 3	Week 4	Week 5	Week 6	Week 7	Week 8	Week 9	Total	Final
Hana Holišová	35	25	11	33	11	30	17	38	35	235	Winner
Ivana Chýlková	22	19	40	14	39	21	17	35	26	233	2nd place
David Kraus	32	30	10	18	12	29	65	25	11	232	3rd place
Iva Pazderková	18	26	21	36	28	36	17	10	22	214	4th place
Anna Fialová	16	26	33	18	20	36	15	14	35	213	—
Petr Rychlý	25	34	10	36	13	12	16	38	8	192	—
Petr Vondráček	18	9	9	21	39	14	24	12	27	173	—
Adam Mišík	18	15	50	8	22	6	13	12	20	164	—

=== Special performances ===
Guest	Performing as	Song	Week
Janek Ledecký	Mick Jagger	"(I Can't Get No) Satisfaction"	1
Jitka Čvančarová	Marilyn Monroe	"I Wanna Be Loved by You"	1
Jakub Kohák	Luciano Pavarotti	"La donna e mobile"	1
Ondřej Sokol	John Travolta	"Stayin' Alive"	2
Jakub Kohák Janek Ledecký Jitka Čvančarová Linda Finková Anna Geislerová	Spice Girls	"Wannabe"	10
Ondřej Sokol Jitka Čvančarová	Lucie Bílá; Ilona Csáková	"Láska je láska"	10
Yemi A.D.	Will Smith	"Men in Black"	10

== Season 2 ==
This season was announced in the year 2016 and started on September 4, 2016. In this Season, Ondřej Sokol was the presenter. The Judges were Jakub Kohák, Iva Pazderková, Janek Ledecký and a special guest such as Simona Babčáková, Jiří Mádl, Richard Genzer, Ewa Farna or Michal Suchánek. Iva Pazderková was the drama coach. Linda Finková was the vocal coach. Yemi A.D. and Angeé Svobodová were the choreographers. The winner of the Second Season was Jan Cina.

=== Contestants ===
Celebrity	Known for	Episodes won	Episodes lost	Result
Jan Cina	Actor	11th, Final	—	Winner
David Gránský	Actor	1st, 9th	4th	2nd place
Marta Jandová	Singer	2nd, 5th, 10th	—	3rd place
Anna Slováčková	Actress	8th	6th	4th place
Roman Vojtek	Actor	3rd	9th	5th place
Markéta Procházková	Singer	4th	3rd, 8th	6th place
Ivana Jirešová	Actress	7th	1st	7th place
Miroslav Etzler	Actor	6th	2nd, 5th, 7th, 10th, 11th	8th place

=== Performances ===
Contestant	Week 1	Week 2	Week 3	Week 4	Week 5	Week 6	Week 7	Week 8	Week 9	Week 10	Week 11	Final
Jan Cina	Madonna	Redfoo; LMFAO	André 3000; OutKast	John Legend	Naďa Urbánková	Billie Joe Armstrong; Green Day	Lene Nystrøm; Aqua	Justin Timberlake	Billy Joel	Bård Ylvisåker; Ylvis	Montserrat Caballé	Scatman John
David Gránský	Nina Simone	Michal David	Freddie Mercury; Queen	Meghan Trainor	The Mad Stuntman; Reel 2 Real	Whoopi Goldberg	Justin Bieber	Phil Collins; Genesis	Jaromír Nohavica	Jennifer Lopez	Ed Sheeran	Marilyn Manson
Marta Jandová	Alice Cooper	Beyoncé	Annie Lennox	Bonnie Tyler	CeeLo Green	Petr Janda; Olympic	Katy Perry	Adele	Loalwa Braz; Kaoma	Meat Loaf	Mariah Carey	Jessica Rabbit
Anna Slováčková	Taylor Swift	Sinéad O'Connor	Eminem	Lady Gaga	Prince	Jessie J	Keith Flint; The Prodigy	Beth Ditto; Gossip	Miley Cyrus	Lana Del Rey	Amy Lee; Evanescence	Katarína Knechtová; Peha
Roman Vojtek	Jiří Korn	Cher	Jon Bon Jovi; Bon Jovi	Ray Charles	Michael Jackson	George Michael	Helena Vondráčková	James Hetfield; Metallica	Shakira	Barry Gibb; Bee Gees	Lionel Richie	Emmy Rossum
Markéta Procházková	Christina Aguilera	Sabrina	Anita Pointer; The Pointer Sisters	H.P. Baxxter; Scooter	Dolores O'Riordan; The Cranberries	Pink	Céline Dion	Nicole Kidman	Axl Rose; Guns N' Roses	Kylie Minogue	Ricky Martin	Catherine Zeta-Jones
Ivana Jirešová	Rihanna	Dusty Hill; ZZ Top	Jana Kratochvílová	Alicia Keys	Lady Miss Kier; Deee-Lite	Vanilla Ice	Björk	Robert Smith; The Cure	Gwen Stefani	Linda Perry; 4 Non Blondes	Taylor Dayne	Renée Zellweger
Miroslav Etzler	Joe Cocker	Bob Marley	Amanda Lear	Ivan Mládek; Banjo Band	Paul Stanley; Kiss	Leonard Cohen	Nicolas Reyes; Gipsy Kings	Petr Hapka	Ella Fitzgerald	Haddaway	Michal Tučný	Gerard Butler

Color key:

indicates the contestant came first that week
indicates the contestant came last that week
indicates the contestant did not score
indicates the contestant was eliminated

=== Results summary ===
Contestant	Week 1	Week 2	Week 3	Week 4	Week 5	Week 6	Week 7	Week 8	Week 9	Week 10	Week 11	Total	Final
Jan Cina	23	31	33	22	32	28	10	28	18	27	67	319	Winner
David Gránský	47	15	31	15	20	8	31	20	37	22	28	274	2nd place
Marta Jandová	25	37	10	28	35	20	14	26	16	40	15	266	3rd place
Anna Slováčková	19	27	30	16	20	7	29	35	19	30	17	249	4th place
Roman Vojtek	14	24	44	17	31	23	16	27	13	26	13	248	—
Markéta Procházková	23	16	9	47	18	27	30	7	30	22	15	244	—
Ivana Jirešová	9	21	13	21	16	35	47	7	21	11	20	221	—
Miroslav Etzler	24	13	14	18	12	36	7	34	30	6	9	203	—

=== Special performances ===
Guest	Performing as	Song	Week
Hana Holišová	Donna Summer	"Hot Stuff"	1
Jakub Kohák Janek Ledecký	Right Said Fred	"I'm Too Sexy"	3
Iva Pazderková	Britney Spears	"Toxic"	6
Jitka Čvančarová	Whitney Houston	"I Have Nothing"	9
Petr Rychlý	Jiří Schelinger	"Šípková Růženka"	10
Anna Fialová	Sia	"Alive"	11
Jakub Kohák Janek Ledecký Iva Pazderková Ondřej Sokol	ABBA	"Dancing Queen"	12

== Season 3 ==
This season was announced in the year 2017 and started on February 26, 2017. In this Season, Ondřej Sokol was the presenter. The Judges were Jakub Kohák, Iva Pazderková, Janek Ledecký and a special guest such as Martin Zounar, Eva Holubová, Simona Krainová, Pavel Liška or Zdeněk Piškula. Iva Pazderková was the drama coach. Linda Finková was the vocal coach. Yemi A.D. and Angeé Svobodová were the choreographers. The winner of the Third Season was Tatiana Vilhelmová.

=== Contestants ===
Celebrity	Known for	Episodes won	Episodes lost	Result
Tatiana Vilhelmová	Actress	2nd, Final	—	Winner
Milan Peroutka	Singer	4th, 7th, 11th	6th, 8th, 9th	2nd place
Markéta Konvičková	Singer	3rd, 10th	2nd	3rd place
Martha Issová	Actress	9th	10th	4th place
Martin Dejdar	Actor	5th	7th	5th place
Ondřej Ruml	Singer	8th	1st, 4th	6th place
Adéla Gondíková	Actress	1st	3rd	7th place
Aleš Háma	Actor	6th	5th, 11th	8th place

=== Performances ===
Contestant	Week 1	Week 2	Week 3	Week 4	Week 5	Week 6	Week 7	Week 8	Week 9	Week 10	Week 11	Final
Tatiana Vilhelmová	Madonna	Michael Jackson; The Jackson 5	Adele	Barbra Streisand	Johnny Rotten; Sex Pistols	Hana Hegerová	Kate Hudson	Jay Kay; Jamiroquai	Maria Callas	Ciara	LunchMoney Lewis	Zuzana Navarová
Milan Peroutka	Petr Muk	Amy Winehouse	Bruno Mars	Mika	Eric Clapton	Enrique Iglesias	Tina Turner	Coolio	Ed Sheeran	Ne-Yo	Andrea Bocelli	Michael Jackson
Markéta Konvičková	Idina Menzel	Olivia Newton-John	Pitbull	Rihanna	Christina Aguilera	Carly Rae Jepsen	Lauri Ylönen; The Rasmus	Lucie Bílá	Shakira	Aretha Franklin	Beyoncé	James Hetfield; Metallica
Martha Issová	Brian Johnson; AC/DC	Kate Bush	Geri Halliwell	Limahl	Duffy	Nena	Marie Rottrová	Janelle Monáe	Lionel Richie	Zaz	Marta Kubišová	Treat Williams
Martin Dejdar	Israel Kamakawiwo'ole	Waldemar Matuška	The Weeknd	Věra Špinarová	Bill Nighy	Joey Tempest; Europe	Little Richard	Lenny Kravitz	Rag'n'Bone Man	Shirley Bassey	Joe Cocker	Dan Aykroyd; The Blues Brothers
Ondřej Ruml	Whitney Houston	Justin Timberlake	Plácido Domingo	James Brown	George Michael	Eminem	Seal	Anastacia	Iggy Pop	Adam Levine; Maroon 5	Dr. Alban	John Belushi; The Blues Brothers
Adéla Gondíková	Tarkan	Annie Lennox; Eurythmics	Kylie Minogue	Ya Kid K Technotronic	Falco	Thomas Anders; Modern Talking	Ruslana	Cher	Dara Rolins	Elvis Presley	Annette Eltice; Ottawan	Hana Buštíková; Kamélie
Aleš Háma	Bobby Farrell; Boney M.	Ozzy Osbourne	Hana Zagorová	Billy Idol	Petr Kotvald	Barry White	David Hasselhoff	Elton John	Lady Gaga	Pavol Habera; Team	Chubby Checker	Dana Vlková; Kamélie

Color key:

indicates the contestant came first that week
indicates the contestant came last that week
indicates the contestant did not score
indicates the contestant was eliminated

=== Results summary ===
Contestant	Week 1	Week 2	Week 3	Week 4	Week 5	Week 6	Week 7	Week 8	Week 9	Week 10	Week 11	Total	Final
Tatiana Vilhelmová	32	36	20	24	30	13	30	17	22	24	36	284	Winner
Milan Peroutka	33	12	23	47	18	9	37	11	7	23	36	256	2nd place
Markéta Konvičková	17	7	45	28	26	13	14	21	26	47	35	279	3rd place
Martha Issová	24	30	13	18	32	26	33	20	50	8	20	274	4th place
Martin Dejdar	23	33	12	19	37	21	11	23	21	26	29	255	—
Ondřej Ruml	6	24	37	11	17	36	22	42	12	27	9	243	—
Adéla Gondíková	35	22	10	14	13	23	17	37	29	16	13	229	—
Aleš Háma	14	20	24	23	11	43	20	13	17	13	6	204	—

=== Special performances ===
Guest	Performing as	Song	Week
Jan Cina	Pharrell Williams	"Freedom"	1
Iva Pazderková	Pink	"Just Like Fire"	9
Petr Rychlý	Václav Neckář	"Půlnoční"	10
Jan Cina Janek Ledecký Jakub Kohák Iva Pazderková	The Black Eyed Peas	"Let's Get It Started"	12
Martin Dejdar Karel Gott	Alphaville	"Forever Young"	12

== Season 4 ==
This season was announced in the year 2017 and started on September 2, 2017. In this Season, Ondřej Sokol was the presenter. The Judges were Jakub Kohák, Janek Ledecký, Aleš Háma and a special guest such as Klára Vytisková, Karolína Kurková, Tereza Kostková, Adéla Gondíková or Lucie Borhyová. Martin Dejdar was the drama coach. Linda Finková was the vocal coach. Yemi A.D. and Angeé Svobodová were the choreographers. The bonus show Nova Taxi was presented by Milan Peroutka. The winner of the Fourth Season was Berenika Kohoutová.

=== Contestants ===
Celebrity	Known for	Episodes won	Episodes lost	Result
Berenika Kohoutová	Actress	5th, 8th, 11th, Final	7th	Winner
Jitka Boho	Model	1st, 9th	6th, 8th	2nd place
Jan Kopečný	Singer	2nd	1st, 3rd	3rd place
Aneta Krejčíková	Actress	4th	—	4th place
Leona Machálková	Singer	3rd	9th	5th place
Dalibor Gondík	Presenter	10th	11th	6th place
Jan Maxián	Voice Actor	6th	2nd, 10th	7th place
Tomáš Matonoha	Actor	7th	4th, 5th	8th place

=== Performances ===
Contestant	Week 1	Week 2	Week 3	Week 4	Week 5	Week 6	Week 7	Week 8	Week 9	Week 10	Week 11	Final
Berenika Kohoutová	Fergie	Katy Perry	Stevie Wonder	Julia Volkova t.A.t.U.	Jennifer Hudson	Charlie Chaplin	Rihanna	Loreen	Ariana Grande	Sam Smith	Eva Pilarová	Keith Flint; The Prodigy
Jitka Boho	Beyoncé	Marilyn Manson	Jackson Moore; Boys Town Gang	Sia	Meghan Trainor	Luis Fonsi	Janet Jackson	Courtney Love; Hole	Montserrat Caballé	Alesha Dixon	Emeli Sandé	Selena Gomez
Jan Kopečný	Anthony Kiedis; Red Hot Chili Peppers	John Newman	Jason Derulo	Nicole Kidman	Hozier	Gerard Way; My Chemical Romance	Toto Cutugno	Pink	Bruno Mars	Tom Jones	Michael Jackson	Susan Boyle
Aneta Krejčíková	Freddie Mercury; Queen	Etta James	Christina Aguilera	Marika Gombitová	The Weeknd	Lady Gaga	Joan Jett	Steven Tyler; Aerosmith	Gwen Stefani	Janis Joplin	Adele	Liza Minnelli
Leona Machálková	Whoopi Goldberg	Britney Spears	Tina Turner	Jon Bon Jovi; Bon Jovi	Madonna	Queen Latifah	Gene Kelly	Jennifer Lopez	Debbie Harry; Blondie	Miley Cyrus	Bill Kaulitz; Tokio Hotel	Ariana Grande
Dalibor Gondík	Carl Douglas	Dolly Parton	Elton John	Frank Sinatra	Helena Vondráčková	Michael Fitzpatrick; Fitz and the Tantrums	Ozzy Osbourne; Black Sabbath	Jimmy Pop; Bloodhound Gang	David Škach; Lunetic	Bono; U2	Samantha Fox	Irena Kačírková
Jan Maxián	PSY	Ondřej Hejma; Žlutý pes	Beth Ditto; Gossip	Antonio Romero Monge; Los Del Rio	Redfoo; LMFAO	R. Kelly	Nicki Minaj	James Arthur	Patti Smith	Pharrell Williams	Jean-Pierre Barda; Army of Lovers	John Legend
Tomáš Matonoha	Meryl Streep	Dave Gahan; Depeche Mode	Michael Kocáb; Pražský výběr	Shaggy	Elvis Presley	Precious Wilson; Eruption	Rytmus	Johnny Cash	H.P. Baxxter; Scooter	Barbora Poláková	James Hetfield; Metallica	Josef Bek

Color key:

indicates the contestant came first that week
indicates the contestant came last that week
indicates the contestant did not compete in the finals
indicates the contestant was eliminated

=== Results summary ===
Contestant	Week 1	Week 2	Week 3	Week 4	Week 5	Week 6	Week 7	Week 8	Week 9	Week 10	Week 11	Total	Final
Berenika Kohoutová	11	26	18	29	52	13	7	37	20	29	41	283	Winner
Jitka Boho	43	24	18	29	12	8	39	10	41	20	35	279	2nd place
Jan Kopečný	8	36	11	22	29	32	21	13	36	29	27	264	3rd place
Aneta Krejčíková	36	23	30	46	13	21	10	26	16	25	18	264	4th place
Leona Machálková	28	16	35	10	23	23	30	33	9	23	27	257	—
Dalibor Gondík	21	28	20	33	14	18	16	16	32	34	8	240	—
Jan Maxián	15	15	22	8	29	47	17	22	20	12	18	225	—
Tomáš Matonoha	22	16	30	7	12	22	44	27	10	12	10	212	—

=== Special performances ===
Guest	Performing as	Song	Week
Adam Mišík David Gránský Anna Slováčková Milan Peroutka Ondřej Ruml	Backstreet Boys	"Everybody (Backstreet's Back)"	1
Aleš Háma Jakub Kohák Adéla Gondíková	Boney M.	"Hooray! Hooray! It's a Holi-Holiday"	3
Markéta Procházková Anna Fialová Anna Slováčková	Christina Aguilera; Pink; Lil' Kim	"Lady Marmalade"	7
Iva Pazderková	Jim Morrison	"Break On Through (To the Other Side)"	8
Hana Holišová Tatiana Vilhelmová Jan Cina	Jessie J Nicki Minaj; Ariana Grande	"Bang Bang"	12

== Season 5 ==
This season was announced in the year 2018 and started on September 1, 2018. In this Season, Ondřej Sokol was the presenter. The Judges were Jakub Kohák, Janek Ledecký, Aleš Háma and a special guest such as Tereza Maxová, Jana Plodková, Marika Šoposká, Taťána Gregor Brzobohatá or Anna Geislerová. Aleš Háma was the drama coach. Linda Finková was the vocal coach. Yemi A.D., Angeé Svobodová and Roman Vojtek were the choreographers. The bonus show Face News was presented by Berenika Kohoutová. The winner of the Fifth Season was Michaela Badinková.

=== Contestants ===
Celebrity	Known for	Episodes won	Episodes lost	Result
Michaela Badinková	Actress	6th, 11th, Final	—	Winner
Eva Burešová	Actress	5th	—	2nd place
Patrik Děrgel	Actor	8th	3rd	3rd place
Tereza Mašková	Singer	2nd, 10th	1st, 5th, 11th	4th place
Jan Révai	Actor	3rd, 9th	—	5th place
Vojtěch Drahokoupil	Singer	1st	2nd	6th place
Robert Jašków	Actor	7th	4th, 6th, 8th, 10th	7th place
Jitka Schneiderová	Actress	4th	7th, 9th	8th place

=== Performances ===
Contestant	Week 1	Week 2	Week 3	Week 4	Week 5	Week 6	Week 7	Week 8	Week 9	Week 10	Week 11	Final
Michaela Badinková	Liza Minnelli	Nicole Scherzinger; The Pussycat Dolls	Annie Lennox; Eurythmics	Rick Astley	Camila Cabello	Aretha Franklin	Fergie	Lou Bega	Hana Zagorová	Missy Elliott	Édith Piaf	Christina Aguilera
Eva Burešová	Madonna	Ben Cristovao	Renée Zellweger	Bruce Dickinson; Iron Maiden	Jennifer Hudson	Iggy Azalea	Michael Jackson	Demi Lovato	Christina Aguilera	LP	Alan Duffy; King África	Beyoncé
Patrik Děrgel	James Brown	Anthony Kiedis; Red Hot Chili Peppers	Marlene Dietrich	Mick Jagger	Harry Styles	Hana Hegerová	Rag'n'Bone Man	Pietro Spagnoli	Bruno Mars	Nancy Sinatra	Lenny Kravitz	Cardi B
Tereza Mašková	50 Cent	Rihanna	Pink	Céline Dion	Alice Cooper	Amy Winehouse	Tina Turner	Susan Boyle	Justin Bieber	Marika Gombitová	Paddy Kelly; The Kelly Family	Karel Gott
Jan Révai	Robbie Williams	Frank Sinatra	Jason Derulo	Shirley Bassey	Shaggy	Jacek Koman	Dan Bárta; Sexy Dancers	Cher	Billie Joe Armstrong; Green Day	Calton Coffie; Inner Circle	Dan Reynolds; Imagine Dragons	Sting
Vojtěch Drahokoupil	Adele	James Blunt	Darryl McDaniels; Run-D.M.C.	Ciara	Morten Harket; A-ha	Justin Timberlake	Stromae	Chris Barron; Spin Doctors	Sia	Freddie Mercury; Queen	Katy Perry	Stevie Wonder
Robert Jašków	Till Lindemann; Rammstein	Diana Ross	Arsenie Todiraș; O-Zone	Richard Müller	Meryl Streep	Will Smith	Jarmila Šuláková	David Lee Roth; Van Halen	Chuck Berry	Bobby Farrell; Boney M.	Brian Johnson; AC/DC	Petr Hapka
Jitka Schneiderová	Lady Gaga	Olivia Newton-John	Jiří Korn	Keala Settle	Ella Fitzgerald	Mick Jones; The Clash	Cyndi Lauper	Jennifer Lopez	Grace Jones	PikoTaro	Shania Twain	Hana Hegerová

Color key:

indicates the contestant came first that week
indicates the contestant came last that week
indicates the contestant did not compete in the finals
indicates the contestant was eliminated

=== Results summary ===
Contestant	Week 1	Week 2	Week 3	Week 4	Week 5	Week 6	Week 7	Week 8	Week 9	Week 10	Week 11	Total	Final
Michaela Badinková	34	15	21	13	28	47	36	25	30	25	60	334	Winner
Eva Burešová	24	27	31	28	39	16	31	19	18	33	16	282	2nd place
Patrik Děrgel	24	30	12	20	33	40	15	39	25	13	17	268	3rd place
Tereza Mašková	9	32	19	37	7	17	20	27	25	50	14	257	4th place
Jan Révai	18	13	51	12	9	29	9	17	44	13	19	234	—
Vojtěch Drahokoupil	37	12	14	25	26	11	30	23	14	22	19	233	—
Robert Jašków	25	30	15	10	28	9	36	8	17	8	24	210	—
Jitka Schneiderová	13	25	21	39	14	15	7	26	11	20	15	206	—

=== Special performances ===
Guest	Performing as	Song	Week
Jan Cina	Madonna	"Hung Up"	1
Jitka Boho	Marilyn Manson	"Sweet Dreams (Are Made Of This)"	1
Berenika Kohoutová	Katy Perry	"Roar"	1
David Kraus	Freddie Mercury	"I Want to Break Free"	1
Markéta Konvičková	Pitbull	"I Know You Want Me (Calle Ocho)"	1
Milan Peroutka	Michael Jackson	"Black or White"	1
Iva Pazderková	Pharrell Williams	"Happy"	1
Ondřej Sokol Lucie Borhyová	Hana Zagorová; Karel Vágner	"Hej mistře basů"	7
Ondřej Ruml Jan Kopečný Anna Slováčková Markéta Konvičková	One Direction	"One Way Or Another"	11
Berenika Kohoutová Aleš Háma Jakub Kohák Janek Ledecký Iva Pazderková Jitka Boho	Mamma Mia! Cast	"Waterloo"	12

== Season 6 ==
This season was announced in the year 2019 and started on September 7, 2019. In this Season, Ondřej Sokol was the presenter. The Judges were Jakub Kohák, Janek Ledecký, Aleš Háma and a special guest such as Lucie Bílá, Zdeněk Pohlreich, Sharlota, Kristýna Leichtová or Leoš Mareš. Patrik Děrgel was the drama coach. Linda Finková was the vocal coach. Yemi A.D. and Angeé Svobodová were the choreographers. There was a special Czechoslovak week in this season. The bonus show Tvoje tvář Backstage was presented by contestants from previous seasons. The winner of the Sixth Season was Marek Lambora.

=== Contestants ===
Celebrity	Known for	Episodes won	Episodes lost	Result
Marek Lambora	Actor	2nd, 9th, 11th, Final	—	Winner
Kateřina Marie Fialová	Actress	8th	—	2nd place
Roman Zach	Actor	5th	6th, 8th	3rd place
Debbi	Singer	6th	9th	4th place
Robert Urban	Actor	4th, 10th	2nd, 3rd, 5th, 7th	5th place
Zuzana Norisová	Actress	7th	10th	6th place
Kateřina Brožová	Actress	3rd	1st	7th place
Ján Jackuliak	Actor	1st	4th, 11th	8th place

=== Performances ===
Contestant	Week 1	Week 2	Week 3	Week 4	Week 5	Week 6	Week 7	Week 8	Week 9	Week 10	Week 11	Final
Marek Lambora	Cher	Mick Jagger; The Rolling Stones	Jason Derulo	Justin Timberlake	Ben E. King	Naďa Urbánková	Hugh Jackman	Ryan Gosling	Missy Elliott	Šimon Caban	Freddie Mercury; Queen	Prince
Kateřina Marie Fialová	Jiří Korn	Jennifer Lopez	Nicki Minaj	Sean Kingston	Avril Lavigne	Rihanna	Taylor Swift	Michael Jackson	Billie Eilish	Berenika Kohoutová	Camila Cabello	Sia
Roman Zach	Till Lindemann; Rammstein	Bradley Cooper	Ella Fitzgerald	Elvis Presley	Nicolas Reyes; Gipsy Kings	Dexter Holland; The Offspring	Juraj Kukura	Tshawe Baqwa; Madcon	Dani Klein; Vaya Con Dios	Josef Vojtek; Kabát	Michael Stipe; R.E.M.	Lionel Richie
Debbi	LP	Eminem	Christina Aguilera	Marilyn Manson	Janis Joplin	The Weeknd	MØ	Pink	Nicole Blonsky	Peter Dvorský	Adele	Beyoncé
Robert Urban	Mikolas Josef	Tina Turner	Steven Tyler; Aerosmith	Marilyn Monroe	PSY	Álvaro Soler	Lucía Muñoz; Las Ketchup	Miroslav Žbirka	Robbie Williams	Jana Kratochvílová	RuPaul	Lil Nas X
Zuzana Norisová	Britney Spears	Kate Bush	Barry Gibb; Bee Gees	Katy Perry	Kapitán Demo	Meghan Trainor	CeeLo Green; Gnarls Barkley	Kate Pierson; The B-52's	Kylie Minogue	Dara Rolins	Robert Smith; The Cure	Billy Ray Cyrus
Kateřina Brožová	Snoop Dogg	Rita Ora	Macy Gray	Madonna	Annie Lennox	Stevie Wonder	Whitney Houston	Gwen Stefani	Redfoo; LMFAO	Helena Vondráčková	Liza Minnelli	Lady Gaga
Ján Jackuliak	Aretha Franklin	Bruno Mars	Ed Sheeran	Franky Gee; Captain Jack	Janet Jackson	Ewan McGregor	David Draiman; Disturbed	Netta	Jay Kay; Jamiroquai	Richard Krajčo; Kryštof	Jacek; All X	Tony Bennett

Color key:

indicates the contestant came first that week
indicates the contestant came last that week
indicates the contestant did not compete in the finals
indicates the contestant was eliminated

=== Results summary ===
Contestant	Week 1	Week 2	Week 3	Week 4	Week 5	Week 6	Week 7	Week 8	Week 9	Week 10	Week 11	Total	Final
Marek Lambora	21	36	14	22	25	22	28	21	48	22	52	312	Winner
Kateřina Marie Fialová	27	28	13	15	24	35	19	62	19	19	20	281	2nd place
Roman Zach	24	25	33	15	40	10	30	8	23	23	20	250	3rd place
Debbi	14	35	27	22	24	40	13	22	8	19	25	249	4th place
Robert Urban	25	11	12	44	9	27	7	22	29	47	9	242	—
Zuzana Norisová	16	18	35	18	11	18	47	20	18	15	24	240	—
Kateřina Brožová	13	18	38	40	11	21	17	16	14	23	27	238	—
Ján Jackuliak	45	13	12	8	40	11	22	13	25	16	7	212	—

=== Special performances ===
Guest	Performing as	Song	Week
Berenika Kohoutová Eva Burešová Markéta Procházková Jitka Boho Anna Slováčková	The Pussycat Dolls	"Buttons"	1
Zdeněk Pohlreich	Ray Parker Jr.	"Ghostbusters"	3
Ondřej Sokol Aleš Háma	Milan Chladil; Jaroslav Štercl	"Jezdím bez nehod"	4
Lucie Bílá	Lucie Bílá	"Tygřice"	12

== Season 7 ==
This season was announced in the year 2020 and started on September 5, 2020. In this Season, Vladimír Polívka was the presenter. The Judges were Ondřej Sokol, Eva Burešová, Aleš Háma and a special guest such as Patricie Pagáčová, Mirai Navrátil, Přemek Forejt, Helena Vondráčková or Ondřej Brzobohatý. Jan Cina was the drama coach. Linda Finková was the vocal coach. Miňo Kereš and Zizoe were the choreographers. There were two special Czechoslovak weeks in this season. The bonus show Tvoje tvář Backstage was presented by Kristýna Vacenovská. The winner of the Seventh Season was Jitka Čvančarová.

=== Contestants ===
Celebrity	Known for	Episodes won	Episodes lost	Result
Jitka Čvančarová	Actress	6th, Final	—	Winner
Albert Černý	Singer	8th	11th	2nd place
Erika Stárková	Actress	2nd, 4th, 11th	5th, 10th	3rd place
Bára Basiková	Singer	1st	3rd	4th place
Bořek Slezáček	Actor	5th	1st, 6th, 9th	5th place
Martin Schreiner	Singer	3rd, 10th	4th, 8th	6th place
Jordan Haj	Director	7th	—	7th place
Andrea Kalousová	Model	9th	2nd, 7th	8th place

=== Performances ===
Contestant	Week 1	Week 2	Week 3	Week 4	Week 5	Week 6	Week 7	Week 8	Week 9	Week 10	Week 11	Final	
Jitka Čvančarová	Yvetta Simonová	Marie Rottrová	Madonna	Robert Kodym; Wanastowi Vjecy	Nina Hagen	Adele	Cardi B	Karol Duchoň	Delia	Elton John	Aretha Franklin	Tina Turner	Susan Boyle
Albert Černý	Sam Smith	Petr Hapka	Vojtěch Dyk	Jane Russell	Chester Bennington; Linkin Park	Freddie Mercury; Queen	Justin Bieber	Helena Vondráčková	Ivan Mládek; Banjo Band	George Michael	Beyoncé	Michael Jackson	Jožo Ráž; Elán
Erika Stárková	Lady Gaga	Jan Kalousek	Nicki Minaj	Christina Aguilera	Kabir Bedi	The Weeknd	Beth Ditto; Gossip	Marika Gombitová	Rag'n'Bone Man	Pink	Inva Mula	Cyndi Lauper	Shakira
Bára Basiková	Tones and I	Eva Pilarová	Michal David	Céline Dion	Tina Turner	Taylor Swift	Axl Rose; Guns N' Roses	Karel Gott	Sia	Liza Minnelli	Marta Kubišová	Diana Ross	Shirley Manson; Garbage
Bořek Slezáček	Billy Idol	Josef Vojtek; Kabát	Cher	Sean Paul	Jaromír Nohavica	Andreas Lundstedt; Alcazar	Naďa Urbánková	Michal Tučný	David Koller; Lucie	Conchita Wurst	Marilyn Manson	Lionel Richie	Hugh Grant
Martin Schreiner	Věra Špinarová	Peter Hrivňák; Horkýže Slíže	Lewis Capaldi	Jay Kay; Jamiroquai	Elaine Paige	Sandra	Pokáč	Xindl X	Missy Elliott	James Arthur	Jason Derulo	Stevie Wonder	Hana Zagorová
Jordan Haj	Bruno Mars	Lucie Bílá	Robbie Williams	Harry Styles	Jennifer Lopez	Israel Kamakawiwo'ole	Amy Winehouse	Mikolas Josef	Alice Cooper	Jiří Korn	Michael Jackson	Billy Joel	Petr Rezek
Andrea Kalousová	Britney Spears	Lucie Vondráčková	Mirai Navrátil; Mirai	Natalia Oreiro	Fergie	František Nedvěd	Ricky Martin	Hana Buštíková; Kamélie	Billie Eilish	Dua Lipa	Kali	Kenny Rogers	Scott Porter

Color key:

indicates the contestant came first that week
indicates the contestant came last that week
indicates the contestant did not compete in the finals
indicates the contestant was eliminated

=== Results summary ===
Contestant	Week 1	Week 2	Week 3	Week 4	Week 5	Week 6	Week 7	Week 8	Week 9	Week 10	Week 11	Total	Final
Jitka Čvančarová	29	23	28	13	26	45	24	17	18	23	36	282	Winner
Albert Černý	26	11	32	40	23	28	36	46	9	18	11	280	2nd place
Erika Stárková	25	39	26	40	7	17	11	21	25	18	40	269	3rd place
Bára Basiková	45	36	8	20	31	12	13	25	30	23	19	262	4th place
Bořek Slezáček	8	32	21	27	41	10	24	32	9	28	19	251	—
Martin Schreiner	13	9	41	8	23	20	26	14	32	28	25	239	—
Jordan Haj	14	26	13	19	23	35	36	14	12	18	21	231	—
Andrea Kalousová	24	8	15	17	10	17	9	15	49	28	13	205	—

=== Special performances ===
Guest	Performing as	Song	Week
Přemek Forejt	Justin Timberlake	"Like I Love You" "Señorita"	3
Jan Cina Ondřej Sokol Eva Burešová Aleš Háma Vladimír Polívka	Alice Farkašová; Jiří Korn; Karel Gott; Václav Neckář; Waldemar Matuška	"Asi, asi"	4
Ondřej Sokol Eva Burešová Aleš Háma	Majka z Gurunu	"Spadla z oblakov"	10
Jan Cina Vojtěch Drahokoupil Ondřej Ruml David Gránský Robert Urban	Backstreet Boys	"Larger Than Life" "I Want It That Way" "Everybody (Backstreet's Back)"	11
Hana Holišová Michaela Badinková Marek Lambora Jan Cina Berenika Kohoutová Aleš Háma Eva Burešová All Contestants	USA For Africa	"We Are The World"	12

== Season 8 ==
This season was announced on January 18, 2021, and started on March 21, 2021. This season featured contestants from previous seasons. In this Season, Ondřej Sokol and Aleš Háma were the presenters. The Judges were Jakub Kohák, Eva Burešová, Marek Lambora and a special guest such as Hana Vagnerová, Marek Ztracený, Veronika Arichteva, Dagmar Havlová or Jan Cina. Jitka Čvančarová was the drama coach. Linda Finková was the vocal coach. Miňo Kereš and Zizoe were the choreographers. There were two special Czechoslovak weeks and a week of duets in this season. The bonus show Tvoje tvář Backstage was presented by Kristýna Vacenovská. Hana Holišová won for the second time. The winner of the Eighth Season was also David Gránský.

=== Contestants ===
Celebrity	Previous		Known for	Episodes won	Episodes lost	Result
Celebrity	Season	Place	Known for	Episodes won	Episodes lost	Result
David Gránský	2	2nd	Actor	4th, Final	—	Winner
Hana Holišová	1	Winner	Actress	5th, 6th, 10th	4th	1st place
Albert Černý	7	2nd	Singer	1st, 9th	6th	3rd place
Marta Jandová	2	3rd	Singer	—	—	4th place
Iva Pazderková	1	4th	Actress	—	8th	5th place
Jitka Boho	4	2nd	Model	3rd, 7th	—	6th place
Vojtěch Drahokoupil	5	6th	Singer	8th	2nd, 4th	7th place
Roman Vojtek	2	5th	Actor	4th	9th	8th place
Petr Rychlý	1	6th	Actor	—	5th	9th place
Berenika Kohoutová	4	Winner	Actress	2nd	1st, 3rd, 7th	10th place

=== Performances ===
Contestant	Week 1	Week 2	Week 3	Week 4	Week 5	Week 6	Week 7	Week 8	Week 9	Final	
David Gránský	Adam Levine; Maroon 5	Jana Brejchová	Patrick Swayze	David Bowie	Jason Derulo	Beyoncé	Daniel Nekonečný	Lewis Capaldi	Sia	Terrence Mann	Michael Jackson
Hana Holišová	Kylie Minogue	Michal Tučný	Jennifer Lopez	Helena Vondráčková	Steven Tyler; Aerosmith	Michael Jackson	Lucie Bílá	Catherine Zeta-Jones	Mikolas Josef	Pam Klinger	Lady Gaga
Albert Černý	PSY	Karel Gott	Eminem	Whitney Houston	Martin Ďurinda; Tublatanka	Chris Martin; Coldplay	Eva Pilarová	Paul Stanley; Kiss	Adele	Cameron English	Doja Cat
Marta Jandová	Jiří Schelinger	Petra Janů	Elvis Presley	Mariah Carey	Madonna	Dolly Parton	Pavel Bobek	Pink	Whitney Houston	Jan Gan Boyd	Nicolas Reyes; Gipsy Kings
Iva Pazderková	Lady Gaga	Kamil Střihavka	Anita Doth; 2 Unlimited	Shakira	Eva Urbanová	Harry Styles	Katarína Knechtová; Peha	Dua Lipa	Freddie Mercury; Queen	Janet Jones	Marcela Holanová
Jitka Boho	Dee Snider; Twisted Sister	Anna Veselá	Miley Cyrus	Rihanna	Scatman John	Christina Aguilera	Iveta Bartošová	Karel Hála	Beyoncé	Alyson Reed	Christina Aguilera
Vojtěch Drahokoupil	Sam Smith	Dara Rolins	Justin Bieber	Václav Neckář	Britney Spears	Leoš Mareš	David Koller; Lucie	Lady Gaga	Bruno Mars	Justin Ross	František Nedvěd
Roman Vojtek	Judy Garland	Petr Kotvald	Aretha Franklin	Freddie Mercury; Queen	Ricky Martin	Hana Zagorová	Jarmila Šuláková	The Weeknd	Justin Timberlake	Michael Douglas	Karel Gott
Petr Rychlý	Édith Piaf	Rytmus	Štefan Margita	Vilém Čok	Petra Černocká	Eduard Khil	Jaroslav Bobowski; Premier	Karel Šíp; Triky a pověry	Waldemar Matuška	Pat McNamara	Jan Nedvěd
Berenika Kohoutová	Ladislava Kozderková	Bára Basiková	Ava Max	Jiří Korn	Diana Ross	Marilyn Monroe	Peter Nagy	Cher	Rihanna	Vicki Frederick	Pitbull

Color key:

indicates the contestant came first that week
indicates the contestant came last that week
indicates the contestant did not compete in the finals
indicates the contestant was eliminated

=== Results summary ===
Contestant	Week 1	Week 2	Week 3	Week 4	Week 5	Week 6	Week 7	Week 8	Week 9	Total	Final
David Gránský	21	15	37	44	29	48	38	50	36	318	Winner
Hana Holišová	39	18	18	30	43	48	41	40	15	292	1st place
Albert Černý	51	35	19	33	22	13	15	40	44	272	3rd place
Marta Jandová	16	42	26	33	36	31	35	40	32	291	4th place
Iva Pazderková	25	32	20	41	42	36	19	40	14	269	—
Jitka Boho	16	17	45	41	19	25	43	40	15	261	—
Vojtěch Drahokoupil	41	9	21	30	15	18	11	75	37	257	—
Roman Vojtek	23	18	40	44	21	19	38	40	11	254	—
Petr Rychlý	23	37	26	37	8	16	22	45	36	250	—
Berenika Kohoutová	15	47	18	37	35	16	8	40	30	246	—

=== Special performances ===
Guest	Performing as	Song	Week
Ondřej Sokol Aleš Háma	Yvetta Simonová; Milan Chladil	"My dva a čas"	4
Eva Burešová Marek Lambora	Beyoncé; Bruno Mars	"Formation" "Uptown Funk"	4
All Contestants	A Chorus Line	"One"	10

== Season 9 ==
This season was announced in December 2021 and started on February 27, 2022. In this Season, Ondřej Sokol and Aleš Háma were the presenters. The Judges were Jakub Kohák, Petra Nesvačilová, Eva Burešová and Daniel Dangl. Adéla Gondíková and Dalibor Gondík were the drama coaches. Linda Finková was the vocal coach. Miňo Kereš was a choreographer. There were two special Czechoslovak weeks and Movie week in this season. The bonus show Tvoje tvář Backstage was presented by Petr Havránek. The winner of the Ninth season was Václav Kopta.

=== Contestants ===
Celebrity	Known for	Episodes won	Episodes lost	Result
Václav Kopta	Actor	1st, 9th, Final	—	Winner
Iva Kubelková	Presenter	2nd, 4th	—	2nd place
Monika Absolonová	Singer	6th	—	3rd place
Nikita Machytková	Singer	3rd, 8th	2nd, 7th	4th place
Saša Rašilov	Actor	5th	—	5th place
Denisa Nesvačilová	Actress	7th	3rd, 4th, 8th	6th place
Denis Šafařík	Actor	—	1st, 5th, 9th	7th place
Martin Carev	YouTuber	—	6th	8th place

=== Performances ===
Contestant	Week 1	Week 2	Week 3	Week 4	Week 5	Week 6	Week 7	Week 8	Week 9	Final
Václav Kopta	Brian Johnson; AC/DC	Jiří Šlitr	Věra Špinarová	Dagmar Veškrnová	PSY	Richard Müller	Kali	Tina Turner	Elton John	Panjabi MC
Iva Kubelková	Pokáč	Lucie Bílá	Dua Lipa	Steven Tyler; Aerosmith	Fergie	Bruno Mars	Ivan Mládek; Banjo Band	Sia	Zac Efron	Miley Cyrus
Monika Absolonová	Adele	Miroslav Žbirka	Helena Vondráčková	Michal David	DJ BoBo	Christina Aguilera	Pavol Hammel	Pavel Vítek	Lady Gaga	Rebecca Ferguson
Nikita Machytková	The Weeknd	Monika Bagárová	James Arthur	Beyoncé	Marilyn Monroe	Usher	Josef Vojtek; Kabát	Rihanna	Whitney Houston	Michael Jackson
Saša Rašilov	Pink	Kapitán Demo	Victor Willis; Village People	Oldřich Nový	Ozzy Osbourne; Black Sabbath	Vojtěch Dyk; Nightwork	Lucie Bílá	Keith Flint; The Prodigy	Michael Kocáb; Pražský výběr	John Travolta
Denisa Nesvačilová	Jennifer Lopez	František Ringo Čech	Britney Spears	Nicole Scherzinger; The Pussycat Dolls	Jiří Korn	El Chombo	Jana Kratochvílová	Damiano David; Måneskin	Marilyn Manson	Olivia Newton-John
Denis Šafařík	Miley Cyrus	Pavel Horňák; Kroky Františka Janečka	King Julien	Waldemar Matuška	Kylie Minogue	Redfoo; LMFAO	Petr Sepeši	Naďa Urbánková	Robbie Williams	Václav Neckář
Martin Carev	Marky Mark	Hana Zagorová	Mirai Navrátil; Mirai	Justin Timberlake	Jason Derulo	Petra Janů; Triky a pověry	Radoslav Banga; Gipsy.cz	Joey Tempest; Europe	Conchita Wurst	Helena Vondráčková

Color key:

indicates the contestant came first that week
indicates the contestant came last that week
indicates the contestant did not compete in the finals
indicates the contestant was eliminated

=== Results summary ===
Contestant	Week 1	Week 2	Week 3	Week 4	Week 5	Week 6	Week 7	Week 8	Week 9	Total	Final
Václav Kopta	41	23	10	18	21	27	28	26	42	236	Winner
Iva Kubelková	11	33	16	38	14	20	26	38	24	220	2nd place
Monika Absolonová	40	24	25	23	20	36	15	15	33	231	3rd place
Nikita Machytková	20	9	44	23	38	25	11	41	42	253	4th place
Saša Rašilov	18	17	30	23	38	21	13	24	24	208	—
Denisa Nesvačilová	22	32	9	18	20	15	36	13	33	198	—
Denis Šafařík	10	23	30	23	14	26	29	14	23	192	—
Martin Carev	22	23	20	18	19	14	26	13	27	182	—

=== Special performances ===
Guest	Performing as	Song	Week
Eva Burešová Přemek Forejt	Alicia Keys; James Bay	"Us"	7
Aleš Háma Ondřej Sokol	Vladislav Müller; Martin Čížek	"Přátelé Zeleného údolí"	9
Eva Burešová Erika Stárková	Beyoncé; Kendrick Lamar	"Freedom"	10

== Viewing figures ==
Episode	Season 1	Season 2	Season 3	Season 4	Season 5	Season 6	Season 7	Season 8	Season 9
1	933 000 (March 26, 2016)	1 416 000 (September 4, 2016)	1 266 000 (February 26, 2017)	1 086 000 (September 2, 2017)	947 000 (September 1, 2018)	799 000 (September 7, 2019)	687 000 (September 5, 2020)	935 000 (March 21, 2021)	721 000 (February 27, 2022)
2	978 000 (April 2, 2016)	1 449 000 (September 11, 2016)	1 253 000 (March 5, 2017)	1 053 000 (September 9, 2017)	841 000 (September 8, 2018)	691 000 (September 14, 2019)	738 000 (September 12, 2020)	914 000 (March 28, 2021)	689 000 (March 6, 2022)
3	1 423 000 (April 9, 2016)	1 474 000 (September 18, 2016)	1 210 000 (March 12, 2017)	985 000 (September 16, 2017)	925 000 (September 15, 2018)	700 000 (September 21, 2019)	699 000 (September 19, 2020)	857 000 (April 4, 2021)	630 000 (March 13, 2022)
4	1 627 000 (April 16, 2016)	1 477 000 (September 25, 2016)	1 263 000 (March 19, 2017)	1 062 000 (September 23, 2017)	919 000 (September 22, 2018)	691 000 (September 28, 2019)	705 000 (September 26, 2020)	874 000 (April 11, 2021)	645 000 (March 20, 2022)
5	1 820 000 (April 23, 2016)	1 701 000 (October 2, 2016)	1 254 000 (March 26, 2017)	993 000 (September 30, 2017)	918 000 (September 29, 2018)	764 000 (October 5, 2019)	749 000 (October 3, 2020)	944 000 (April 18, 2021)	635 000 (March 27, 2022)
6	1 465 000 (April 30, 2016)	1 732 000 (October 9, 2016)	1 117 000 (April 2, 2017)	1 252 000 (October 7, 2017)	904 000 (October 6, 2018)	570 000 (October 12, 2019)	891 000 (October 10, 2020)	799 000 (April 25, 2021)	685 000 (April 3, 2022)
7	1 718 000 (May 14, 2016)	1 601 000 (October 16, 2016)	1 320 000 (April 9, 2017)	1 142 000 (October 14, 2017)	830 000 (October 13, 2018)	627 000 (October 19, 2019)	959 000 (October 17, 2020)	842 000 (May 2, 2021)	732 000 (April 10, 2022)
8	1 599 000 (May 28, 2016)	1 476 000 (October 23, 2016)	1 233 000 (April 16, 2017)	966 000 (October 21, 2017)	752 000 (October 20, 2018)	600 000 (October 26, 2019)	1 041 000 (October 24, 2020)	709 000 (May 9, 2021)	616 000 (April 17, 2022)
9	1 717 000 (June 4, 2016)	1 490 000 (October 30, 2016)	1 290 000 (April 23, 2017)	1 108 000 (October 28, 2017)	782 000 (October 27, 2018)	686 000 (November 2, 2019)	874 000 (October 31, 2020)	811 000 (May 16, 2021)	686 000 (April 24, 2022)
10	1 623 000 (June 11, 2016)	1 637 000 (November 6, 2016)	1 072 000 (April 30, 2017)	1 034 000 (November 4, 2017)	780 000 (November 3, 2018)	777 000 (November 9, 2019)	881 000 (November 7, 2020)	977 000 (May 23, 2021)	775 000 (May 1, 2022)
11	—	1 616 000 (November 13, 2016)	1 163 000 (May 7, 2017)	1 099 000 (November 11, 2017)	801 000 (November 10, 2018)	655 000 (November 16, 2019)	921 000 (November 14, 2020)	—	—
12	—	1 757 000 (November 20, 2016)	1 353 000 (May 14, 2017)	1 166 000 (November 18, 2017)	831 000 (November 10, 2018)	767 000 (November 23, 2019)	1 111 000 (November 21, 2020)	—	—
Average viewing	1 491 000	1 568 000	1 232 833	1 102 000	889 000	693 000	858 000	866 000	682 000
