= Ordinace v růžové zahradě 2 =

Czech television series

- Genre: Soap opera, medical drama
- Opening theme: Někdy stačí dát jen dech (Miroslav Žbirka)
- Country of origin: Czech Republic
- No. of seasons: 19 (16 in Ordinace v růžové zahradě 2 only)
- No. of episodes: 1,266 (1,071 in Ordinace v růžové zahradě 2 only)

Production
- Running time: 60 minutes (TV Nova, excluding advertisements); 50 minutes (Voyo)
- Production company: TV Nova

Original release
- Network: TV Nova, Voyo
- Release: 6 September 2005

Ordinace v růžové zahradě 2 (until 2008 Ordinace v růžové zahradě, meaning: Doctor's office in the rose garden 2) is a Czech medical drama and soap opera broadcast from 2005 to 2021 on TV Nova channel, from 2021 to 2025 on Voyo.cz and from 2025 on Oneplay.cz. The soap opera plot is about a hospital in fictive town of Kamenice located in Hradec Králové District, its employees (like doctors and nurses, or even the patients) and their life stories, families and relationships.

Until March 2020, the soap opera was broadcast every Tuesday and Thursday in the prime time. In September 2020, after a long pause due to the COVID-19 pandemic, the broadcast time has changed; every Thursday two episodes have been broadcast, and in 2021, only one episode was broadcast each Thursday. Until 2020, every episode was watched by more than a million viewers; when the filming method has changed, the viewership dropped under 900,000 viewers per episode. On 23 November 2020 TV Nova announced that Ordinace v růžové zahradě 2 would end in June 2021. However, on 8 June 2021, it was stated that the series will continue on VOD platform Voyo.

Already 1,266 episodes have been broadcast by 9 August 2022.

== Current actors and main characters ==
There is a big number of characters which appeared in the soap opera. As of February 2021, the main characters (those which get significant attention to their life story) include:

=== Doctors ===
- MUDr. Čestmír Mázl (Petr Rychlý) – gynecologist and former gynecology chief physician, currently falsely accused of brutal attack on Martin Brabec, which was actually done by Darek Vágner
- prim. MUDr. Běla Valšíková (Zlata Adamovská) – pediatrician and pediatry chief physician, wife of Eduard Valšík
- prim. doc. MUDr. Eduard Valšík (Petr Štěpánek) – surgeon, pediatrician and former hospital's director
- doc. MUDr. Leoš Mára (Robert Jašków) – surgeon and former surgery chief physician
- MUDr. Patrik Mára (Patrik Děrgel) – hospital's current director, son of Leoš Mára
- MUDr. Darina Márová (Mahulena Bočanová) – hospital's financial director, ex-wife of Leoš Mára and mother of Patrik Mára
- MUDr. David Suchý (Jan Čenský) – surgeon and new surgery chief physician
- MUDr. Bohdan "Bobo" Švarc (Martin Zounar) – paramedic and former surgeon
- MUDr. Vojtěch Kratochvíl (Ivan Lupták) – young surgeon
- MUDr. Darek Vágner (Michal Novotný) – surgeon, who brutally attacked Martin Brabec
- MUDr. Alena Mázlová (Michaela Badinková) – surgeon, wife of Čestmír Mázl
- MUDr. Zdena Suchá (Dana Morávková) – surgeon, wife of David Suchý
- Rozália Silvánová (Katarína Šafaříková), former Slovak nurse pretending to be her dead twin sister MUDr. Beáta Tóthová, love interest of Vojtěch Kratochvíl
- MUDr. Marika Lukáčová (Andrea Růžičková), surgeon who came back from Slovakia
- MUDr. Táňa Márová (Markéta Děrgelová), pediatrician, ex-wife of Patrik Mára, love interest of Leoš Mára
- MUDr. Brigita "Bibi" Mrázková (Marika Šoposká), pediatrician, who came back from Canada
- MUDr. Zita Hanáková (Jana Holcová), paramedic and rescuer chief physician
- MUDr. Petr Hanák (Radim Fiala), paramedic, husband of Zita Hanáková
- MUDr. Ota Kovář (Martin Stránský), paramedic and former surgeon
- MUDr. Marek Doležal (Štěpán Benoni), paramedic, lovely interested in Brigita Mrázková
- prim. MUDr. Martin Brabec (Pavel Řezníček), gynecologist and new gynecology chief physician, who falsely accused Čestmír Mázl of attacking him and stole his maternity center project

=== Nurses and orderlies ===
- Květa Broučková (Klára Oltová) – head nurse, wife of Vilém Brouček
- Vilém Brouček (Roman Štabrňák) – nurse, husband of Květa Broučková
- Tien Nguyen (Ha Thanh Špetlíková) – nurse
- Lada Hrůzová (Hana Kusnjerová) – nurse
- Radka Loudová (Anna Slováčková) – nurse and room-mate of Beáta Tóthová / Rozália Silvánová
- Ludvík Hečko (Zdeněk Godla) – orderly, step-brother of Bohdan Švarc
- Štefan Tóth (Jan Bidlas) – new orderly, who is blackmailing Beáta Tóthová / Rozália Silvánová by telling everyone who she really is, dies in episode 1010 after car accident
- Aloisie Valšíková (Jana Boušková) – head pediatry nurse
- Saša Lenderová (Táňa Hlostová) – pediatry nurse

=== Others ===
- Lucie Vágnerová (Ivana Jirešová) – bartender and wife of Darek Vágner
- Jakub Mázl (Ladislav Ondřej) – son of Čestmír Mázl, young medic
- Šimon Malý (Šimon Pliska) – young rescuer
- Stanislav Patočka (Jakub Šlégr) – rescuers dispatcher
- Erika Šafářová (Marta Dancingerová) – ambulance driver, former love interest of Marek Doležal, now in love with Saša Lenderová
- Jarmila Kočková (Jana Paulová) – psychologist and mother of Alena Mázlová
- Helga "Heluš" Švarcová (Martina Randová) – hospital buffet worker and wife of Bohdan Švarc
- Hugo Švarc (Matyáš Svoboda) – son of Bohdan Švarc and step-son of Helga Švarcová
- Dorka Poláková (Lucie Černíková) – friend of Lucie Vágnerová, blackmailing Darek Vágner for telling the truth on police about that he was the one, who attacked Martin Brabec
- Jindřich Valšík (Vlastimil Zavřel) – brother of Eduard Valšík, husband of Aloisie Valšíková
- Libuše Hečková (Lenka Termerová) – mother of Bohdan Švarc and Ludvík Hečko
- Júlia Tóthová (Michaela Pecháčková) – daughter of Štefan Tóth and Beáta Tóthová, niece of Rozália Silvánová
- Filip Hanák (Adam Vojtek) – son of Petr Hanák, step-son of Zita Hanáková
- Sylva Bursíková (Marta Maťová) – mother of Lukáš Bursík and former love interest of Marek Doležal
- Lukáš Bursík (Vojtěch Vovesný) – son of Sylva Bursíková and former friend of Marek Doležal, bullying children in his school
- Alex Šofr (Matouš Rajmont) – boxer and arch enemy of Marek Doležal, new partner of Sylva Bursíková

Aside from main characters, a big number of side characters appear in every episode, including patients, people visiting restaurants, nurses and doctors which are unimportant for the plot etc. They are either played by actors, or extras. Most side characters do not significantly affect the plot and don't get much attention, if any. Sometimes real Czech celebrities and important people playing themselves appear as guests in the serial, such as Lucie Borhyová or Jan Pirk. In 2010, former Czech president Václav Havel appeared in the serial.
