= Jireš =

Jireš (feminine: Jirešová) is a Czech surname. Notable people with this surname include:

- Ivana Jirešová (born 1977), Czech actress
- Jaromil Jireš (1935–2001), Czech film director
