= Dance Teacher =

Dance Teacher may refer to:

- Dance teacher
- Dance Teacher (film), a 1952 Soviet drama film
- The Dance Teacher, a 1995 Czech drama film
