= Hana Holišová =

Czech actress and singer

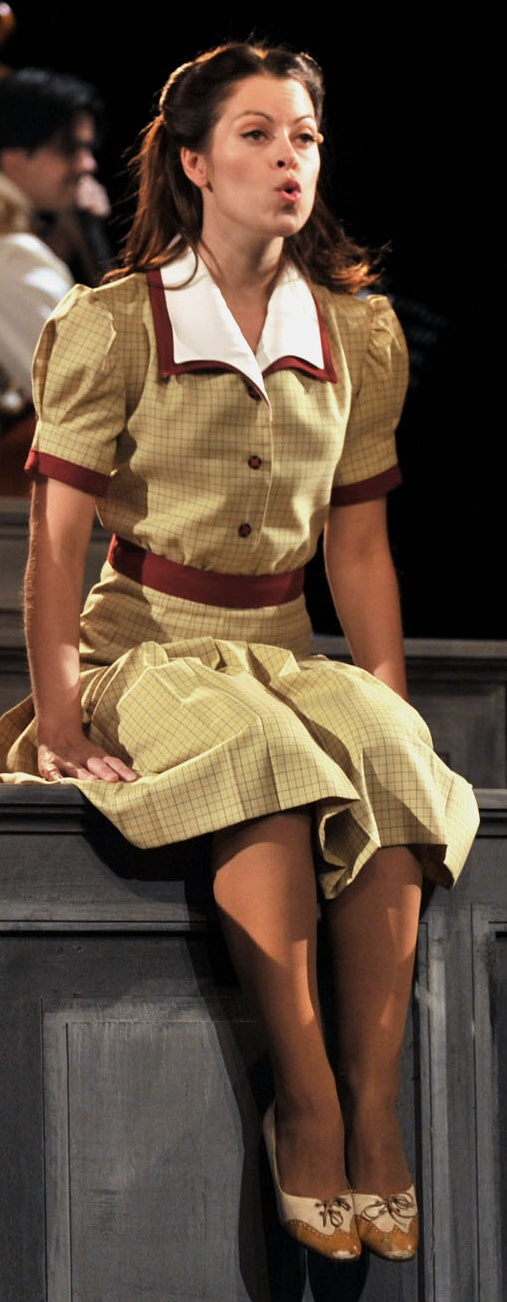
- Holišová in 2010
- Born: 6 August 1980 (age 45); Brno, Czechoslovakia
- Occupation: Actress
- Years active: 2000-present
- Website: hanaholisova.cz

Hana Holišová (born 6 August 1980) is a Czech actress and singer. At the 2012 Thalia Awards she won the category of Best Actress in a Musical.

== Biography ==
Holišová studied at the Janáček Academy of Music and Performing Arts in Brno. She went on to perform in theatres such as Brno City Theatre, National Theatre Brno, and Divadlo Bolka Polívky (all in Brno), Musical Theatre Karlín and Divadlo pod Palmovkou (both in Prague) and New Scene (Bratislava). She took part in, and won, the 2016 series of Tvoje tvář má známý hlas.

== Selected filmography ==
- Velmi křehké vztahy (television, 2007–2009)
- Ulice (television, 2014–present)
