= Andrea Kalousová =

Czech model and beauty pageant titleholder

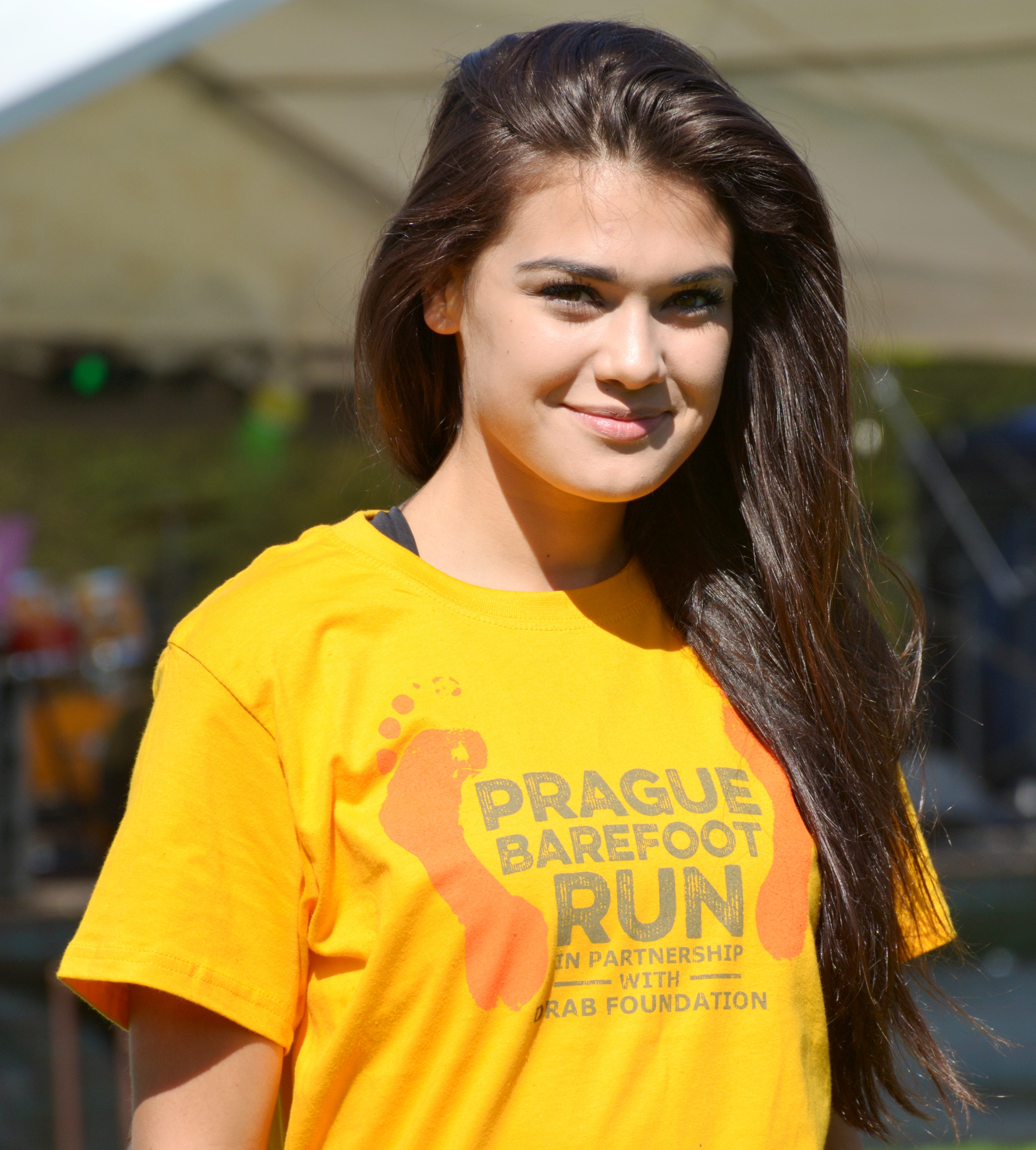
- Portrait of Andrea Kalousová
- Born: Andrea Kalousová; 18 September 1996 (age 30); Jaroměř, Czech Republic
- Height: 1.72 m (5 ft 8 in)
- Beauty pageant titleholder
- Title: Česká Miss World 2015
- Hair color: Black
- Eye color: Brown
- Major competitions: Česká Miss 2015 (1st Runner-up); Miss World 2015 (Unplaced)

Andrea Kalousová (born 18 September 1996) is a Czech model and beauty pageant titleholder who was crowned Česká Miss World 2015 and represented the Czech Republic at Miss World 2015.

== Life and career ==
Kalousová is originally from Jaroměř and currently resides in Jablonné nad Orlicí. She studied at a nursing high school in Ústí nad Orlicí.

Kalousová was crowned as 1st Runner-up of Česká Miss 2015 and represented Jablonné nad Orlicí at the pageant on 28 March 2015. The pageant was broadcast live on TV.

In 2020, she was a contestant in Season 7 of the Czech reality TV show Tvoje tvář má známý hlas.

Awards and achievements
Preceded by Tereza Skoumalová	Czech Miss; 2015	Succeeded by Natalie Kotkova
