= Jablonné nad Orlicí =

- Town
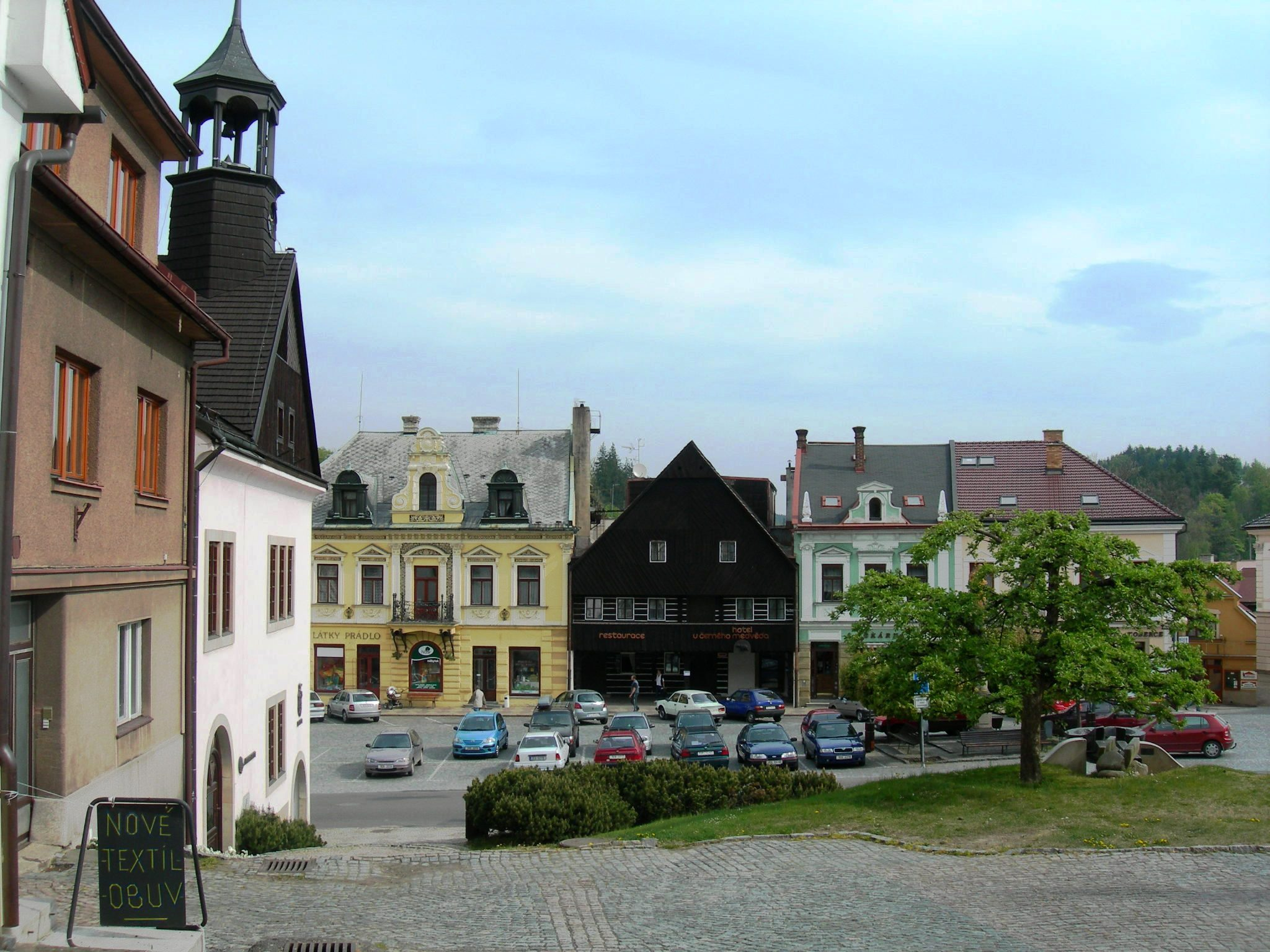
- The square Náměstí 5. května

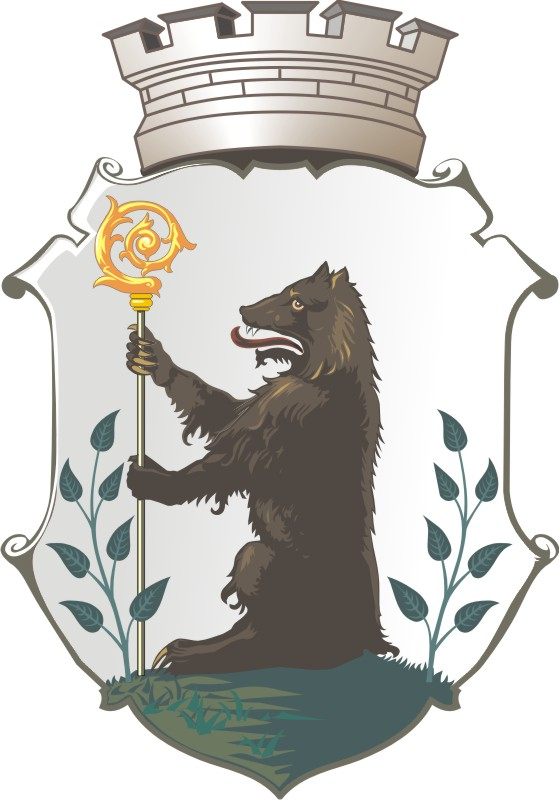
- Flag Coat of arms

- Location in the Czech Republic
- Coordinates: 50°1′47″N 16°36′2″E
- Country: Czech Republic
- Region: Pardubice
- District: Ústí nad Orlicí
- First mentioned: 1304

Government
  - Mayor: Roman Nožka

Area
  - Total: 4.38 km^{2} (1.69 sq mi)
- Elevation: 421 m (1,381 ft)

Population (2026-01-01)
  - Total: 3,085
  - Density: 704/km^{2} (1,820/sq mi)
- Time zone: UTC+1 (CET)
  - Summer (DST): UTC+2 (CEST)
- Postal code: 561 64
- Website: www.jablonneno.cz

Jablonné nad Orlicí (Czech pronunciation: [ˈjablonɛː ˈnat orlɪtsiː]; German: Gabel an der Adler) is a town in Ústí nad Orlicí District in the Pardubice Region of the Czech Republic. It has about 3,100 inhabitants. The town proper is located on the Tichá Orlice River in the Orlické Foothills.

Jablonné nad Orlicí was founded in the second half of the 13th century and became a town in 1906. The historic town centre is well preserved and is protected as an urban monument zone.

== Etymology ==
The town was originally called Gablona. It was probably a term for a customhouse, where charges were levied for transported salt.

== Geography ==
Jablonné nad Orlicí is located about 15 kilometres (9 mi) northeast of Ústí nad Orlicí and 57 km (35 mi) east of Pardubice. It lies mostly in the Orlické Foothills, but the eastern elongated part of the municipal territory extends into the Orlické Mountains. The highest point is at 586 m (1,923 ft) above sea level. The Tichá Orlice River flows through the municipality.

== History ==
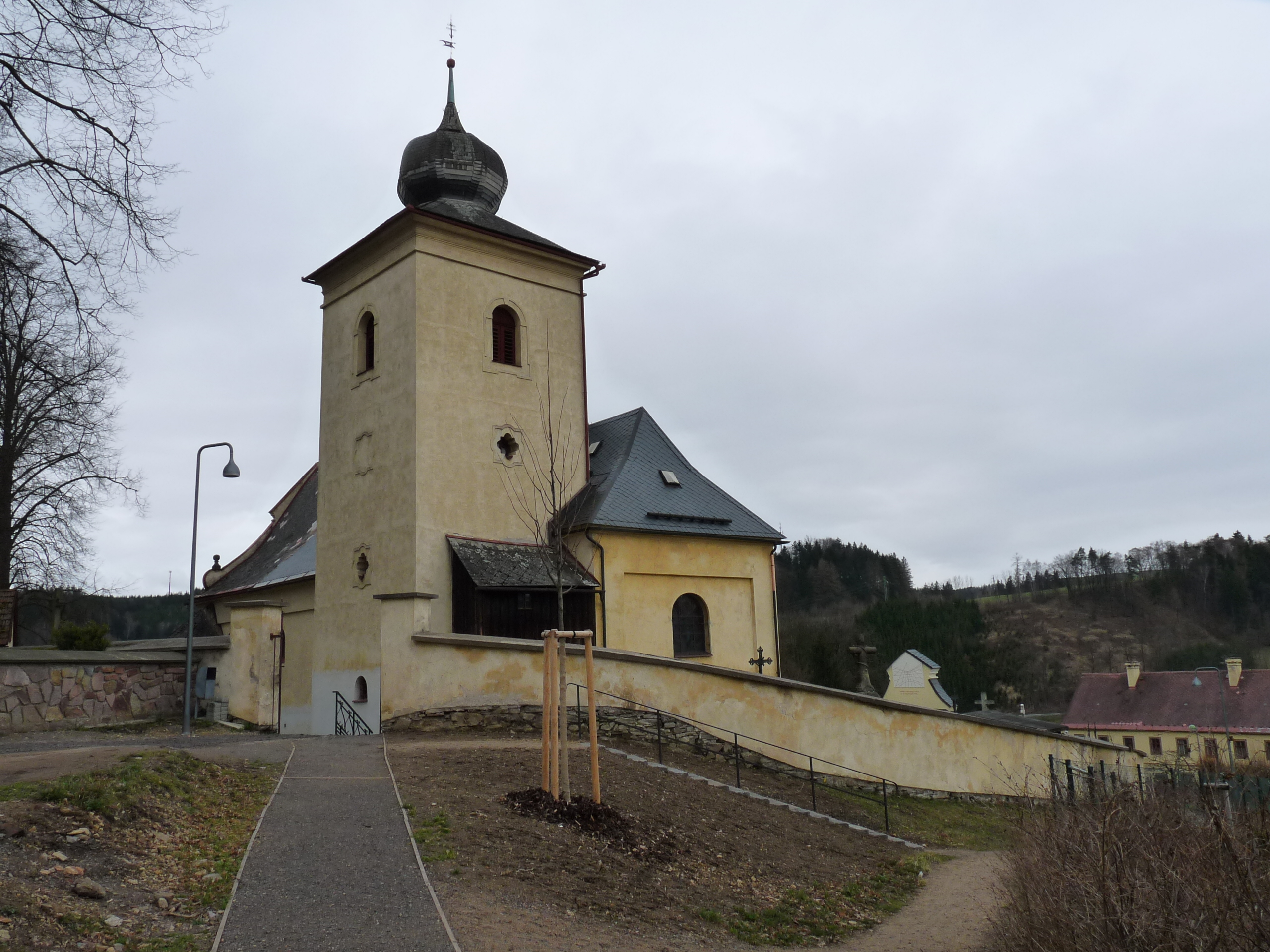
Church of Saint Bartholomew

The first written mention of Jablonné is from 1304 as Gablona. It was founded in the second half of the 13th century, probably in 1285, when the Lanšperk estate was donated to Záviš of Falkenstein by King Wenceslaus II.

In the first half of the 14th century Jablonné belonged to Zbraslav Monastery. From 1409 to 1453 Jablonné formed a small separate estate. In 1453, it was acquired by the Kostka of Postupice family and merged again with Lanšperk estate. In 1507, Jablonné was bought by the Pernštejn family and in 1508, it was promoted to a market town.

In 1588, Jablonné was acquired by the Hřán family, and sold to Prince Karl I of Liechtenstein in 1622. His descendants held possession of Jablonné until 1918. In 1874, the railway was built, which started the economical development of the market town. In 1906, Jablonné was promoted to a town.

== Demographics ==
Historical population

| Year | Pop. | ±% |
|---|---|---|
| 1869 | 941 | — |
| 1880 | 1,042 | +10.7% |
| 1890 | 1,125 | +8.0% |
| 1900 | 1,248 | +10.9% |
| 1910 | 1,787 | +43.2% |

| Year | Pop. | ±% |
|---|---|---|
| 1921 | 1,786 | −0.1% |
| 1930 | 1,768 | −1.0% |
| 1950 | 1,582 | −10.5% |
| 1961 | 2,086 | +31.9% |
| 1970 | 2,502 | +19.9% |

| Year | Pop. | ±% |
|---|---|---|
| 1980 | 2,883 | +15.2% |
| 1991 | 3,095 | +7.4% |
| 2001 | 3,119 | +0.8% |
| 2011 | 3,158 | +1.3% |
| 2021 | 2,905 | −8.0% |

Source: Censuses

== Transport ==
The I/11 road from Hradec Králové to Šumperk runs through the town.

Jablonné nad Orlicí is located on the railway lines Prague–Gdynia and Ústí nad Orlicí–Moravský Karlov.

== Sights ==
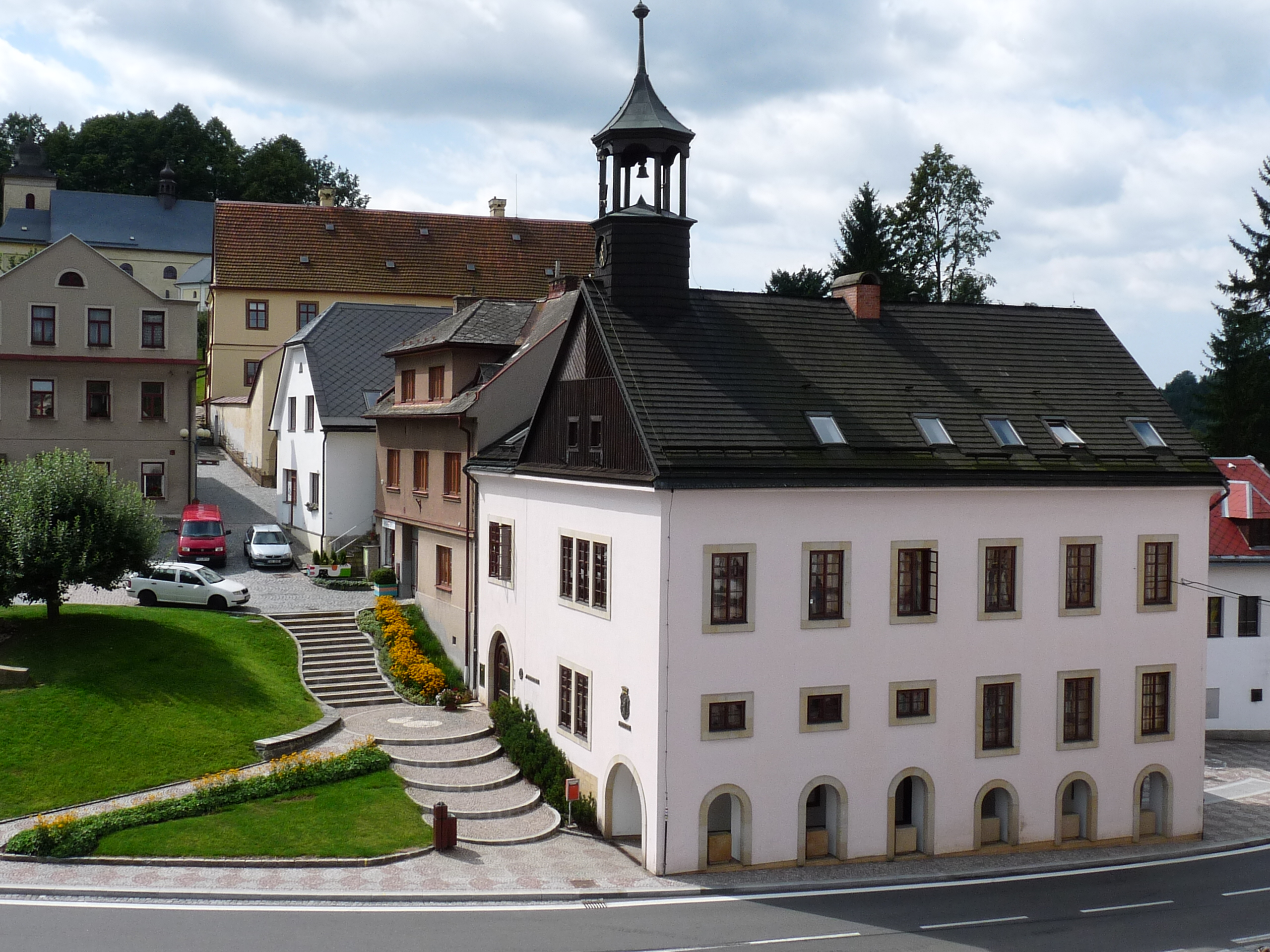
Town hall

The historic centre is formed by the square Náměstí 5. května and adjacent streets. In the historic centre there are many preserved houses in folk architecture and in the Baroque style. The main landmark of the square is a storey farmhouse with arcade and wooden porch from 1750, nowadays the town hall. The Marian column in the middle of the square is from 1748.

The Church of Saint Bartholomew was built in the Baroque style in 1732. It replaced an older church destroyed by fire.

== Notable people ==
- Andrea Kalousová (born 1996), Czech Miss 2015

== Twin towns – sister cities ==
Jablonné nad Orlicí is twinned with:

- Hinwil, Switzerland
- Kondratowice, Poland
- Seehausen, Germany

Jablonné nad Orlicí also cooperates with Stockerau in Austria.
