= Věra Špinarová =

Czech singer (1951–2017)

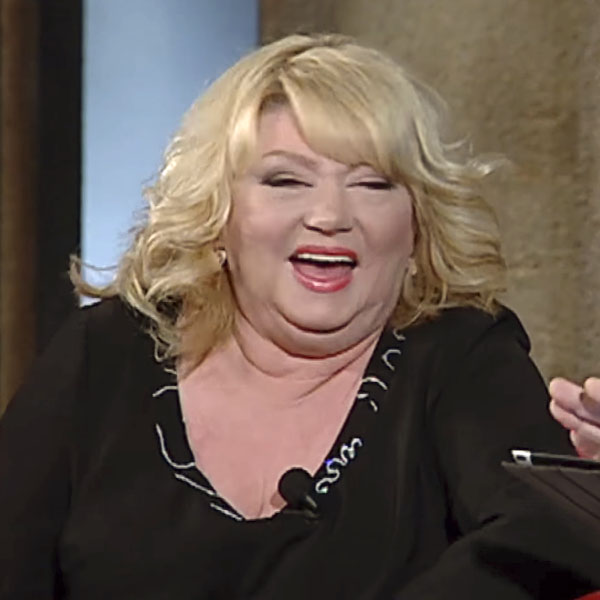

Background information
- Born: 22 December 1951; Pohořelice, Czechoslovakia
- Died: 26 March 2017 (aged 65) Prague, Czech Republic
- Genres: pop; rock
- Occupations: Singer
- Years active: 1967–2017
- Labels: Panton; Supraphon

Věra Špinarová (22 December 1951 – 26 March 2017) was a Czech singer with an alto voice. She was born in Pohořelice, near Brno, Czechoslovakia, and moved to the Czech city of Ostrava with her parents at the age of seven. She learned to play the violin as a child.

== Career ==
Špinarová performed with the rock band Flamengo in the late 1960s. She then joined rhythm & blues group Majestic. Her first solo LP entitled Andromeda came out in 1972 under the Panton label, the rest were published under the Supraphon label. Špinarova placed third in the 1976 Bratislavská lýra pop song festival, with her song "Lúčenie", which she sang in Slovak. In January 1979, Špinarova recorded the song "Jednoho dne se vrátíš" which, set to music from the film Once Upon a Time in the West, became the biggest-selling song of her career.

== Personal life ==
In 1972 Špinarova married pianist Ivo Pavlík, with whom she had a son called Adam. They divorced in 1984. Her second husband, Vítězslav Vávra, was a singer and drummer.

== Death and legacy ==
On 26 March 2017, Špinarova died at Motol University Hospital in Prague, four days after suffering a heart attack at a concert in Čáslav. Days prior, she had appeared alongside Martin Dejdar, who imitated her, on stage in the Czech version of Your Face Sounds Familiar. Her funeral in Ostrava was attended by over 40,000 people. After her death, the city of Ostrava had a statue created by the sculptor David Moješčík and installed in the city's Hus Orchard.

== Discography ==
- 1972 Andromeda
- 1976 Životopis
- 1979 Věra Špinarová 3
- 1982 Meteor lásky
- 1984 Stíny výsluní
- 1985 Věra Špinarová & Speciál '85
- 1986 Věra Špinarová 7
- 1989 Jednoho dne se vrátiš (compilation)
- 1993 ... a pořád tě mám ráda
- 1994 Já si broukám
- 1996 Když se láskám stýská
- 1996 Andromeda
- 2000 Největší hity (compilation)
- 2001 Za vše můžu já
- 2002 Největší hity 2 (compilation)
- 2003 Věra Špinarová 1 Jednoho dne se vrátíš (compilation)
- 2003 Věra Špinarová 2 Letní ukolébavka (compilation)
- 2004 To nejlepší (compilation)
- 2005 Čas můj za to stál
- 2005 Když se láskám stýská
- 2011 Jednoho dne se vrátíš/Zlatá kolekce (3CD compilation)
