= Petra Janů =

Czech singer and actress (born 1952)

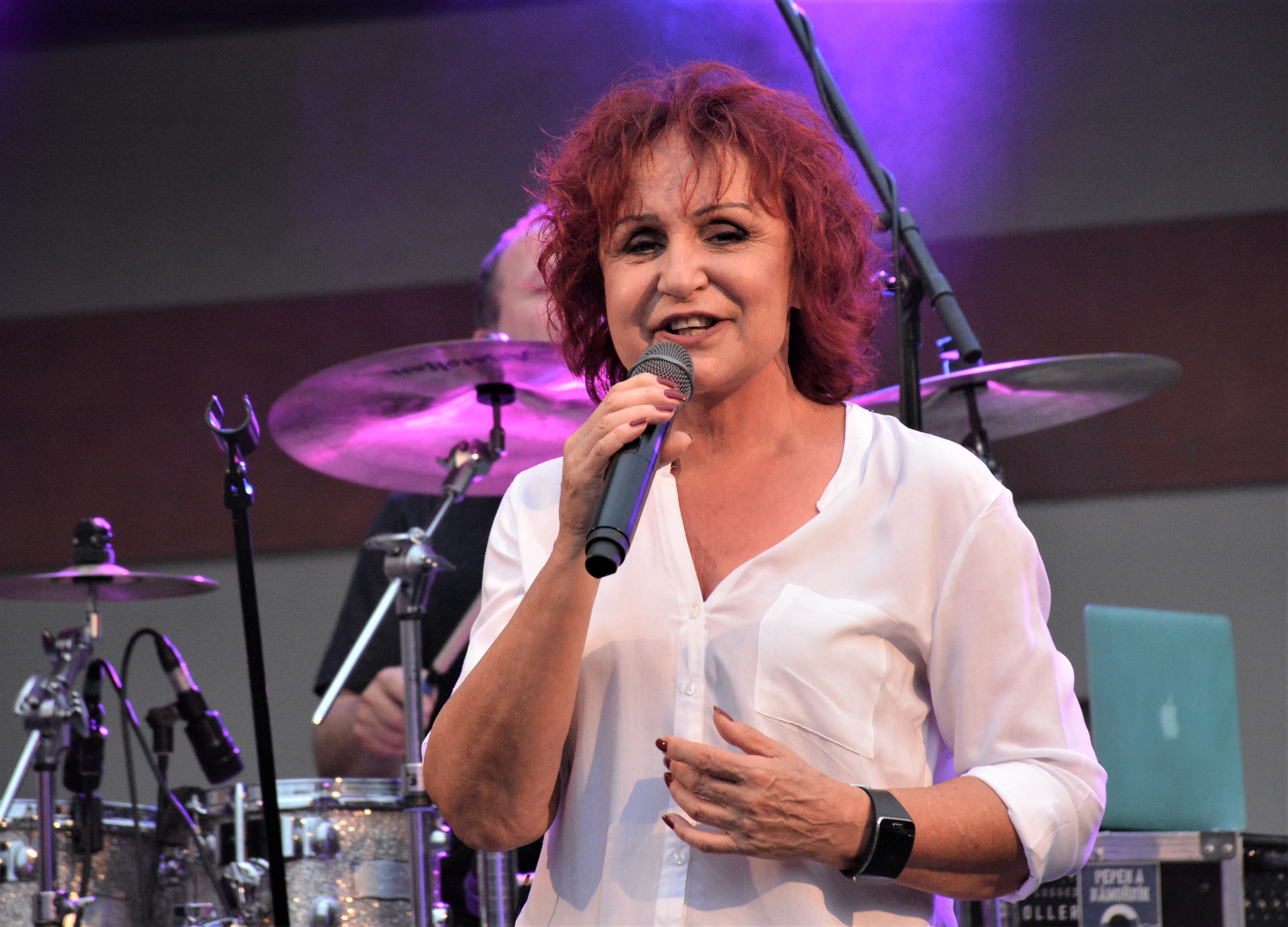
- Janů in 2018

Background information
- Birth name: Jana Petrů
- Born: 19 November 1952 (age 72); Prague, Czechoslovakia
- Occupation(s): Singer, actress
- Instrument: Vocals
- Years active: 1977–present
- Labels: Supraphon; Parlophone
- Formerly of: C&K Vocal
- Spouse: Michal Zelenka (1978–2011)
- Website: petrajanu.cz

Petra Janů (born Jana Petrů, 19 November 1952) is a Czech singer and actress. She won the 1987 Zlatý slavík for Female Singer of the Year, ahead of Iveta Bartošová and Bára Basiková. She won the same award again in 1988 and 1989.

== Discography ==
=== Studio albums ===
- Album (1997)
- Jedeme dál II with Petr Janda (2000)
- Vzpomínky: Film & Muzikál (2009)
- Kouzlo (2009)

=== Live albums ===
- Live v Lucerně (2015)

== Awards and nominations ==
Year	Award	Category	Result	Ref
1987	Zlatý slavík	Female Singer of the Year	Winner	
1988	Zlatý slavík	Female Singer of the Year	Winner	
1989	Zlatý slavík	Female Singer of the Year	Winner	
