= Bára Basiková =

Czech singer and actress (born 1963)

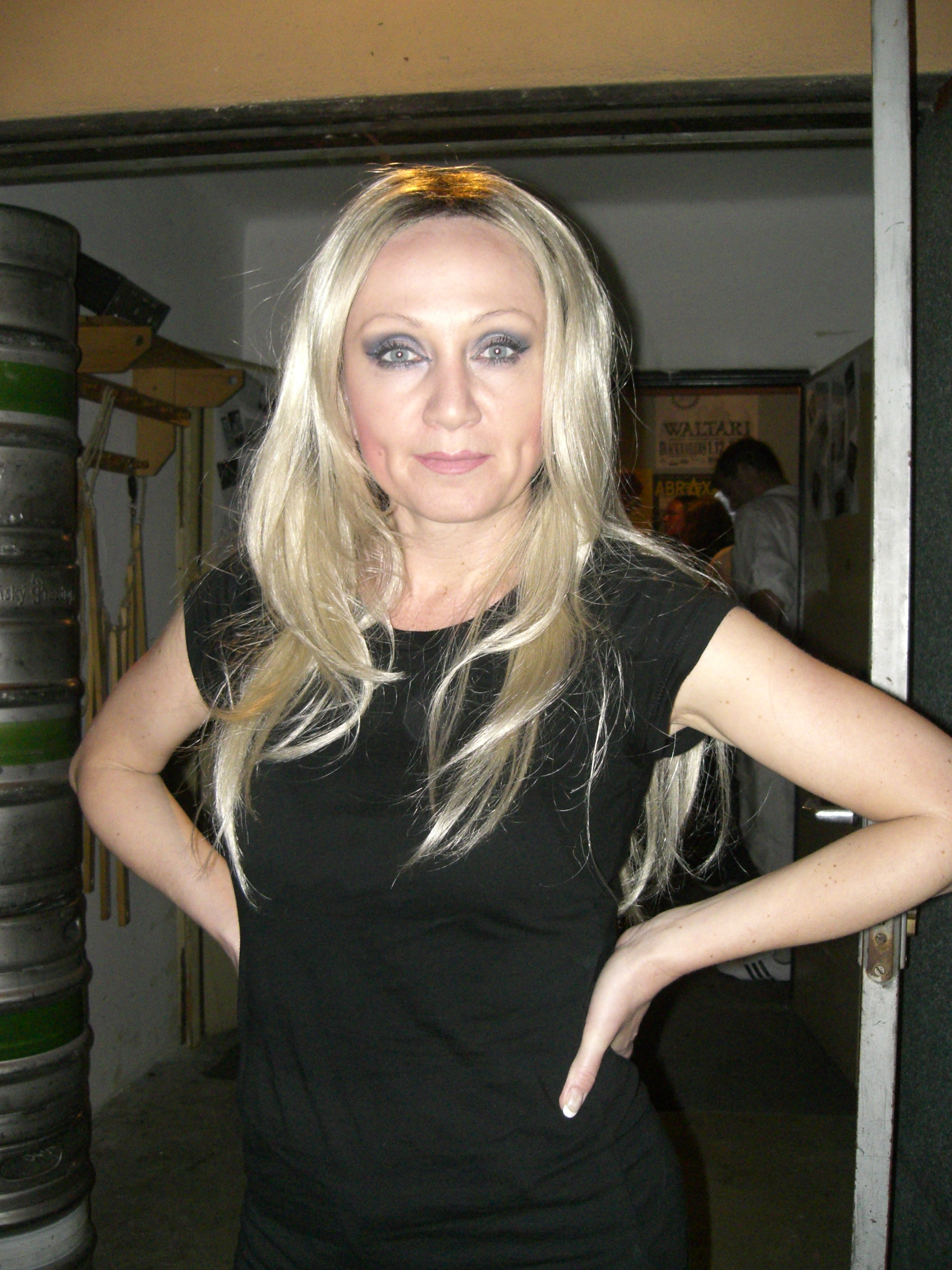
- Basiková in 2007

Background information
- Born: Barbora Basiková; 17 February 1963 (age 63); Prague, Czechoslovakia
- Occupations: Singer, actress
- Years active: 1987–present
- Label: Parlophone
- Website: barabasikova.cz

Barbora "Bára" Basiková (born 17 February 1963) is a Czech singer and actress. She was named Female Singer of the Year at the 1991 Anděl Awards. In 2002, she performed the title role in the famous Czech musical, Kleopatra, at Prague's Broadway Theatre. Basiková placed third in the 1987 Zlatý slavík for female singer behind Petra Janů and Iveta Bartošová.

== Discography ==
=== Studio albums ===
- 1991: Bára Basiková
- 1992: Responsio Mortifera
- 1993: Dreams Of Sphinx
- 1993: Viktorie královská
- 1998: Gregoriana
- 1999: Nová Gregoriana
- 2001: Tak jinak

== Awards and nominations ==
Year	Nominated work	Award	Category	Result	Ref
1987	Herself	Zlatý slavík	Female Singer of the Year	Third	
2015	Herself	Anděl Awards	Female Singer of the Year	Winner	
