= Jitka Čvančarová =

Czech actress (born 1978)

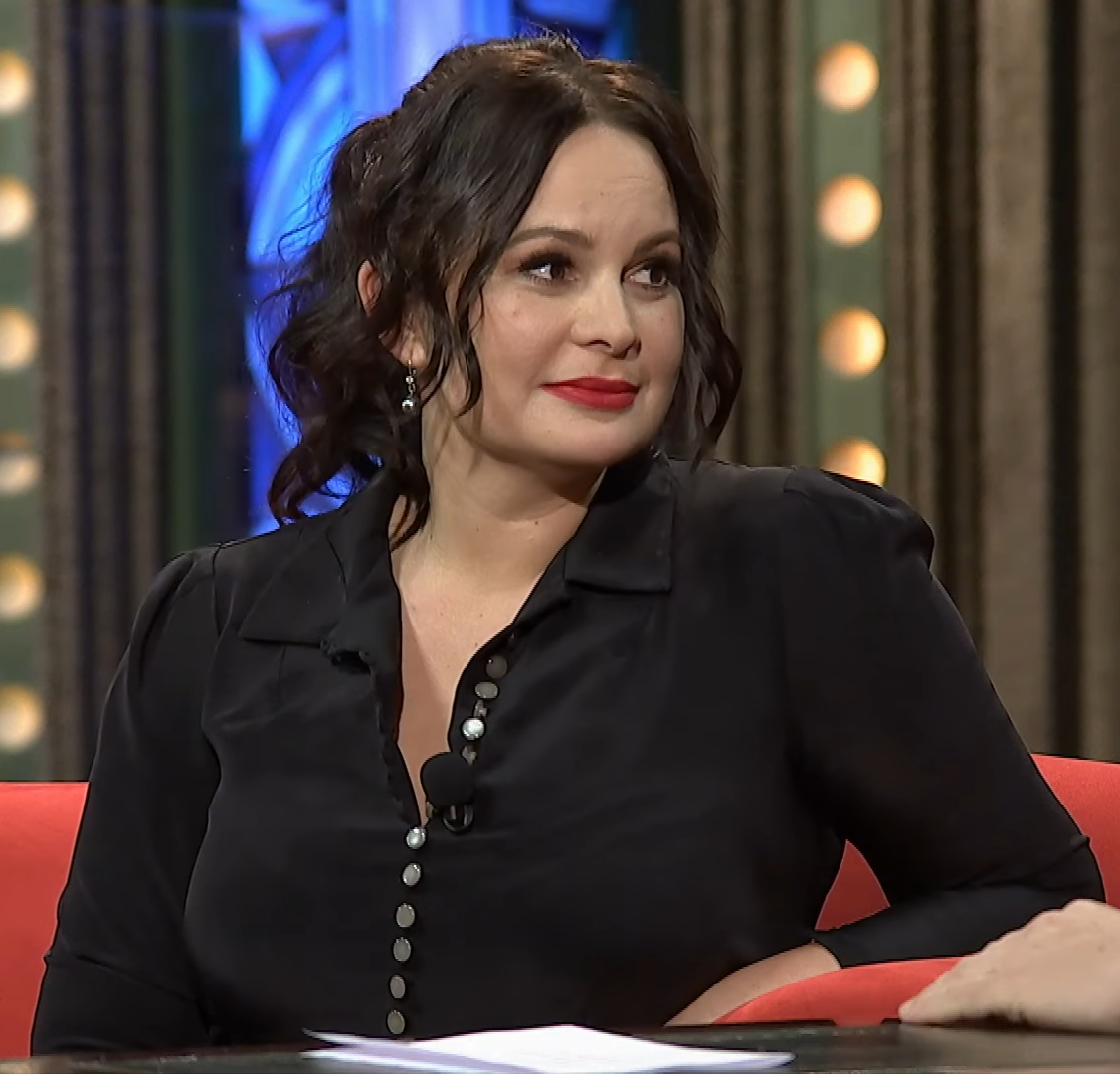
- Čvančarová in 2018
- Born: 23 March 1978 (age 47); Mělník, Czechoslovakia (now Czech Republic)
- Occupation: Actress
- Spouse: Petr Čadek (2011–present)
- Children: Elena Emilie a Theodor Christian

Jitka Čadek Čvančarová (born 23 March 1978) is a Czech actress, UNICEF Goodwill Ambassador, and a patron of charity organization Debra CR. Čvančarová won four Thalia Award nominations.

== Life and career ==
Čvančarová was born on 23 March 1978 in Mělník. She studied at Secondary Technical School in Mělník and also she studied Musical Acting in Janáček Academy of Musical Arts.

== Filmography ==
- "Dokonalý svět" (2010) TV seriál .... Michelle
- Who's Afraid of the Wolf (2008) .... Terezka's Mum
- Svatba na bitevním poli (2008) .... Jarunka
- Bestiář (2007) .... Sabina
- Restart (2005) .... Marie's Flatmate
- The Painted Bird (2019) ....Ludmila

== Episode roles in TV series ==
- "To nevymyslíš" (2006) playing ??? in episode: "Babička inkognito" 2006
- "To nevymyslíš" (2006) playing Patricie in episode: "Harassment" 2006
- "Černí baroni" (2004) playing Marcela in episode: "Podraz" 2004
- "Četnické humoresky" (1997) playing ??? in episode: "Hypnotizér" 2000
- Az po usi ...HBO ( Zuzana)

== Theatre ==
=== Městské divadlo ===
- West Side Story .... Maria
- Babylon .... Sibia
- My Fair Lady .... Lisa Doolittle
- Peer Gynt .... Anitra
- Svět plný andělů .... Sandra/Lea
- Love's Labor's Lost .... Rosalina
- Manželství na druhou aneb Barillonova svatba .... Virginie
- Cabaret .... Sally Bowles
- Racek .... Masha
- Hair .... Sheila
- Not Now Darling .... Janie McMichael
- Nanna .... Nanna
- The Tempest .... Miranda
- Slaměný klobouk .... Louisa (Eugéne Labiche)
- Mary Stuart .... Mary Stuart
- Cikáni jdou do nebe .... Rada
- The Witches of Eastwick .... Sookie

=== G Studio ===
- Viva Musical live .... Company
- Viva Musical II aneb kapky děště z Broadwaye
- Viva Broadway Night
- Nuns .... Sister Mary Lea
- Nuns II .... Sister Mary Lea

=== Divadlo Pod Palmovkou ===
- Ještě jednou, profesore .... Natasha
- Gazdina roba .... Eva
- Vivat! Vivat! Regina! .... Mary Stuart

== Another Stage Works ==
- Garderobiér .... Irena (Bolek Polívka Theatre, Brno)
- Cikáni jdou do nebe .... Julie/Rada (Divadlo Bez zábradlí, Prague)
- Les Misérables .... Fantine (GoJa Music Hall, Prague)
- Racek .... Masha (Slezské divadlo, Opava)
- Cyrano de Bergerac .... Roxanna (Divadlo v Celetné, Prague)
- Líbánky .... Amanda Prynne (Palace Theatre, Prague)
- The Comedy of Errors .... Adrianna (Summer Shakespeare Festival, Prague)
- Adéla ještě nevečeřela .... Květa (Divadlo Broadway, Prague
