= Martin Dejdar =

Czech film producer, actor and presenter

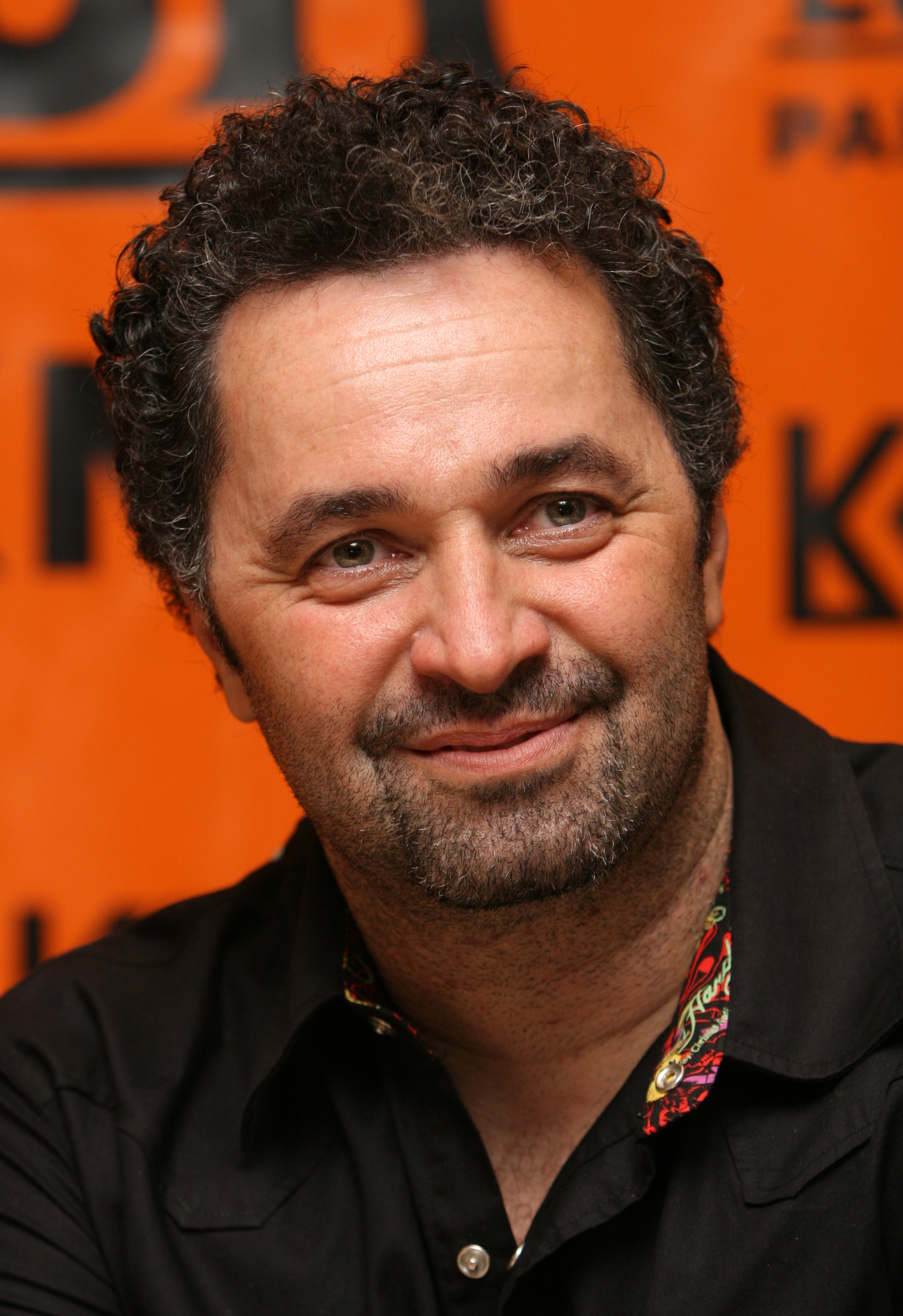
- Martin Dejdar in 2009
- Born: 11 March 1965 (age 61); Vysoké Mýto, Czechoslovakia
- Occupations: Actor, producer
- Years active: 1987–present

Martin Dejdar (born 11 March 1965) is a Czech actor, writer, comedian, director, television presenter, producer and entertainer.

== Biography ==
Dejdar was born on 11 March 1965. He was born in the hospital in Vysoké Mýto, but never lived there. He grew up in Chrast and considers himself a native of Chrast. He graduated from the Theatre Faculty of the Academy of Performing Arts in Prague, from which he holds a Magister degree.

== Career ==
Dejdar is known for his numerous starring roles both comedic and dramatic in theatre, television and film.

An actor that searches for "out of the box" solutions , Dejdar is considered to be one of the most prominent actors of his generation.

Since his debut in 1979, he has amassed over one hundred television and film credits. His lead film roles in Why?, Big Beat and The Manor made him a household name in the Czechoslovakia. He also portrayed Karl Rossmann in the Czech adaptation of Kafka's novel Amerika. He won the 1995 Czech Lion for Best Actor, for his performance in the film Učitel tance.

On stage, he gained acclaim for his performances at Studio Ypsilon, The Summer Shakespeare Festival and The Bobycentrum in Brno. Among his hundred stage credits, he starred in productions of The Servant of Two Masters, Play It Again, Sam, Othello, Anna Karenina, The Brothers Karamazov and A Midsummer Night's Dream.

He played Ozzak in the sitcom Comeback, starring with Tomáš Matonoha. In 2017, he participated in the reality show Tvoje tvář má známý hlas, the third season of Czech version of Your Face Sounds Familiar. After the 12 weeks, he placed 5th. He returned as the guest judge in the second episode of the fourth season.

Starting in 1988, he is the voice of Bart Simpson on the Czech dub of The Simpsons. Beside his voice role in the Czech Simpsons, he also voiced the Czech-version of Stuart Little in the Stuart Little films, Horton the Elephant in Horton Hears a Who!, Reggie in Free Birds and King Louie in live action version of The Jungle Book.

== Selected filmography ==
- Why? (1987)
- Big Beat (1993)
- The Dance Teacher (1995)
- The Manor (1999)
- Přístav (2015–2016, television)
