= Debbi (singer) =

German-Czech singer (born 1993)

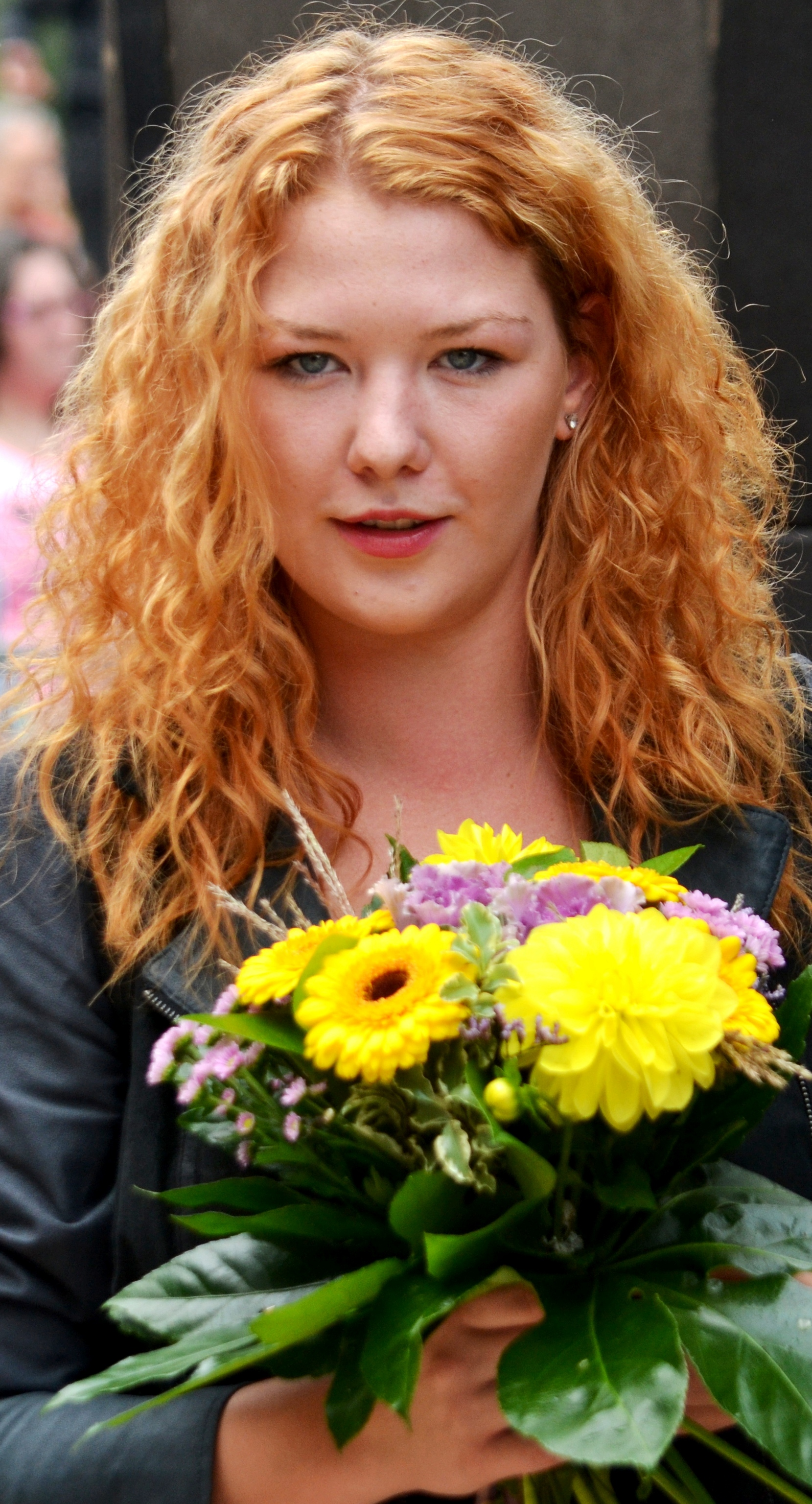
- Debbi in 2014

Background information
- Born: Deborah Kahl; 12 May 1993 (age 33); Dortmund, Germany
- Origin: Czech Republic
- Genres: Pop; rock
- Occupations: Singer
- Years active: 2009–present
- Labels: Sony Music; Universal
- Website: debbi.cz

Debbi (born Deborah Kahl; also Czech: Kahlová; 12 May 1993) is a German-Czech singer of rock and pop music. She was a semi-finalist in the first season of television series Czech and Slovak SuperStar, and won the "Song of the Year" award for her song "Touch the Sun" at the 2010 Anděl Awards. She sings in Czech and English.

== Biography ==
=== Background ===
Debbi was born in Germany to a German father and Czech mother, moving to the Czech Republic with her family when she was ten years old. She has a sister who is two years older than her.

=== Recording career ===
In 2009, Debbi took part in the Czech and Slovak reality television show SuperStar, where she advanced to the semi-finals of the competition. She subsequently signed a record deal with Sony Music and began working with producer Martin Ledvina on her first single. Her song "Touch the Sun" received national recognition in February 2011, as it was awarded the title of 2010's "Song of the Year" at the Anděl Awards. In April 2011, she released her debut album on Sony Music, Touch the Sun. It went directly to the top of the IFPI album chart in the Czech Republic. The album featured English, as well as Czech lyrics. She toured in 2011, undertaking the "Debbi Metaxa Tour 2011", which included a performance in Zlín.

Her second album, Love, Logic & Will, was released in April 2013. The album, which was recorded in Prague, took almost a year to complete. It featured a duet between Debbi and Czech American singer Ivan Kral. The album peaked at number 10 on the Czech album chart. The first single from the album, "You Take Me There", was released in March of that year.

== Discography ==
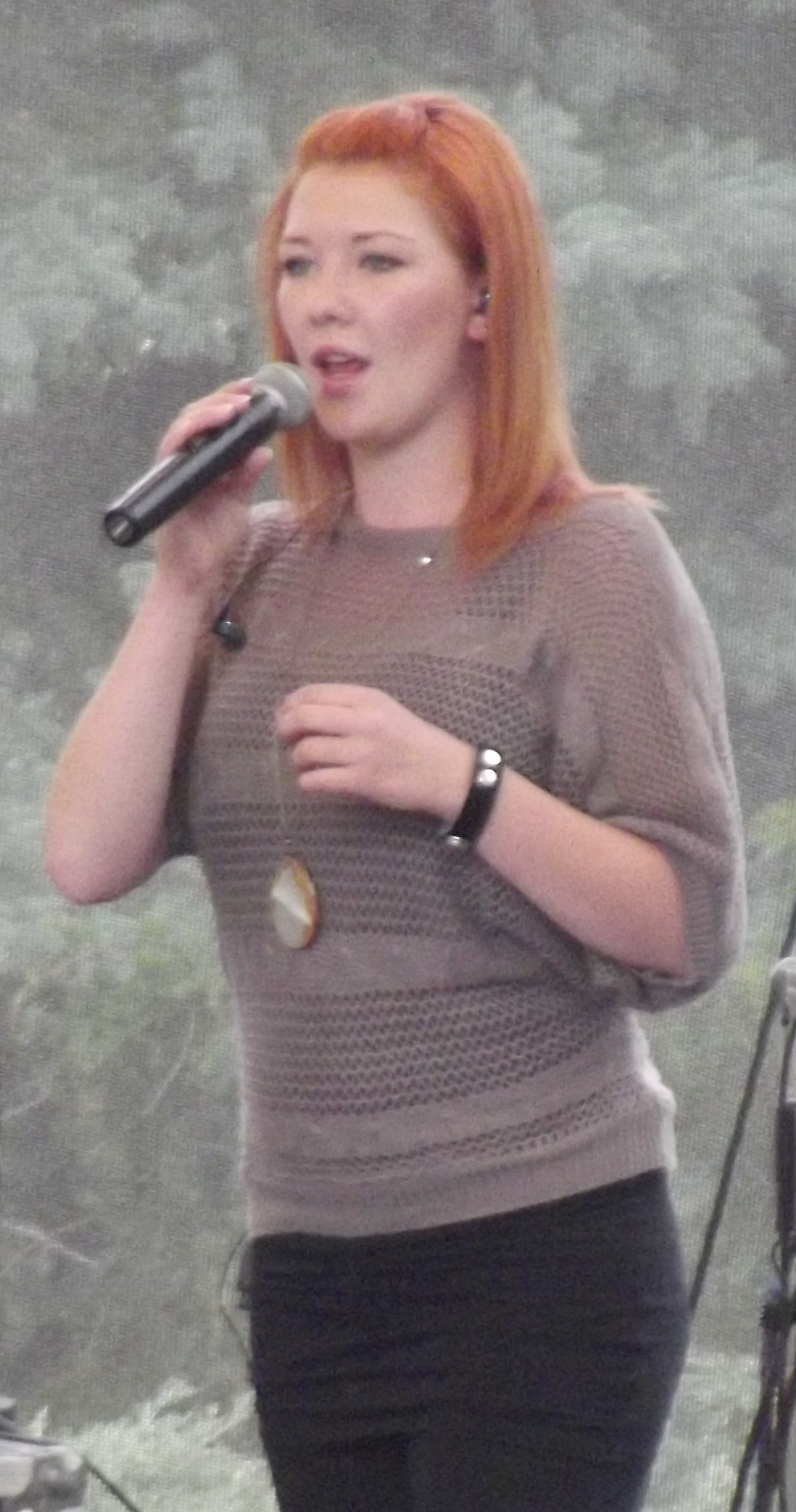
Debbi in 2012

Studio albums

- 2011: Touch the Sun
- 2013: Love, Logic & Will
- 2017: Break

== Awards and nominations ==
Year	Nominated work	Award	Category	Result	Ref
2010	"Touch the Sun"	Anděl Awards	Song of the Year	Winner	
