= Jakub Kohák =

Czech actor and film director

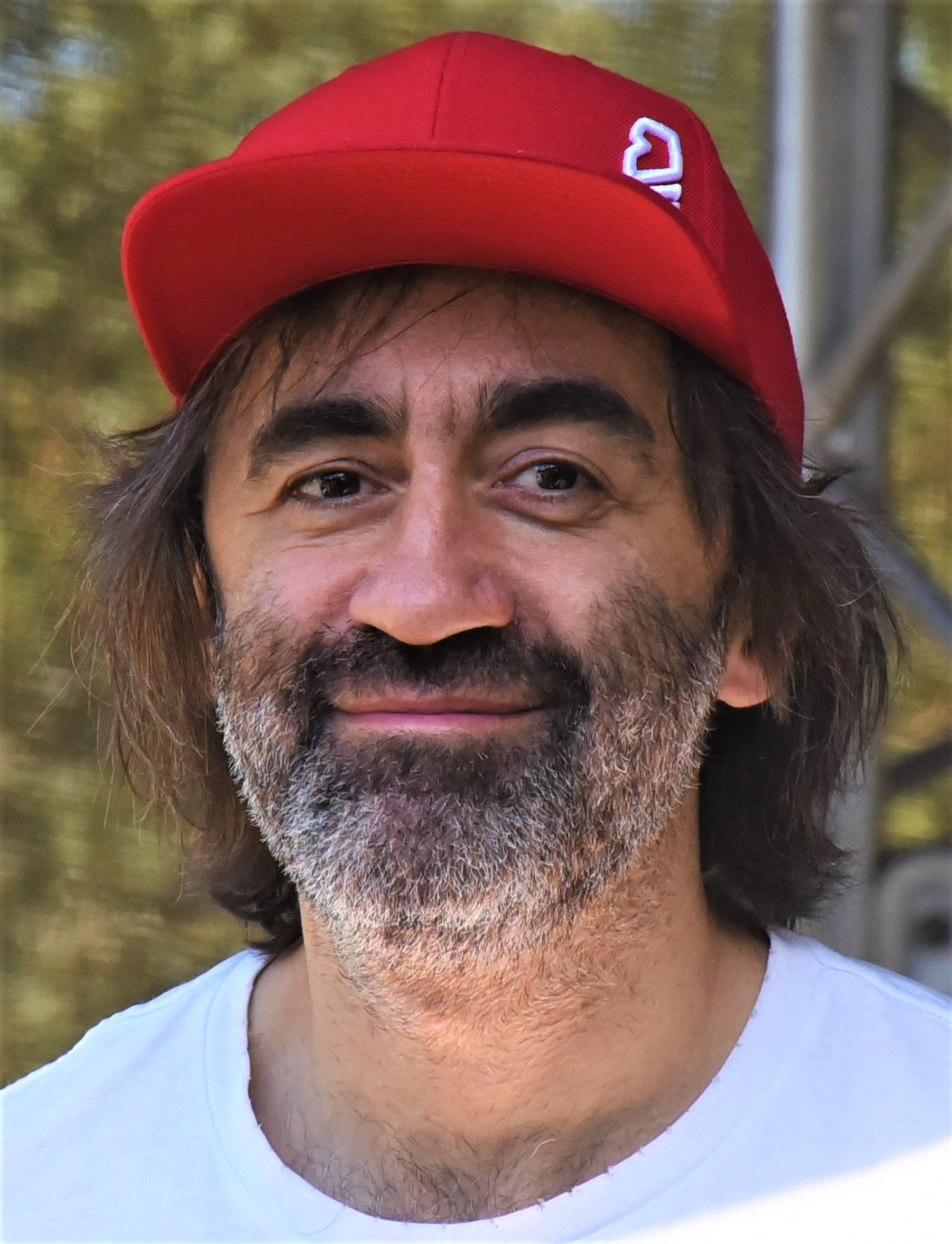
- Kohák in 2019
- Born: 10 October 1972 (age 53); Prague, Czechoslovakia
- Occupations: Actor; film director

Jakub Kohák (born 10 October 1972) is a Czech actor and film director. He is best known for directing commercials and has been an actor in a number of films including Tiger Theory and The Good Plumber.
