= The Dance Teacher =

- Directed by: Jaromil Jireš
- Starring: Martin Dejdar; Jana Hlaváčová
- Release date: 26 January 1995
- Running time: 1h 40min
- Country: Czech Republic
- Language: Czech

The Dance Teacher (Czech: Učitel tance) is a 1995 Czech drama film directed by Jaromil Jireš.

== Cast ==
- Martin Dejdar - Richard Majer
- Jana Hlaváčová - Head nurse
- Miloš Kopecký - Grandfather of Richard
- Barbora Kodetová - Lydie
- Radek Holub - Pardus
