= Marika Šoposká =

Czech actress (born 1989)

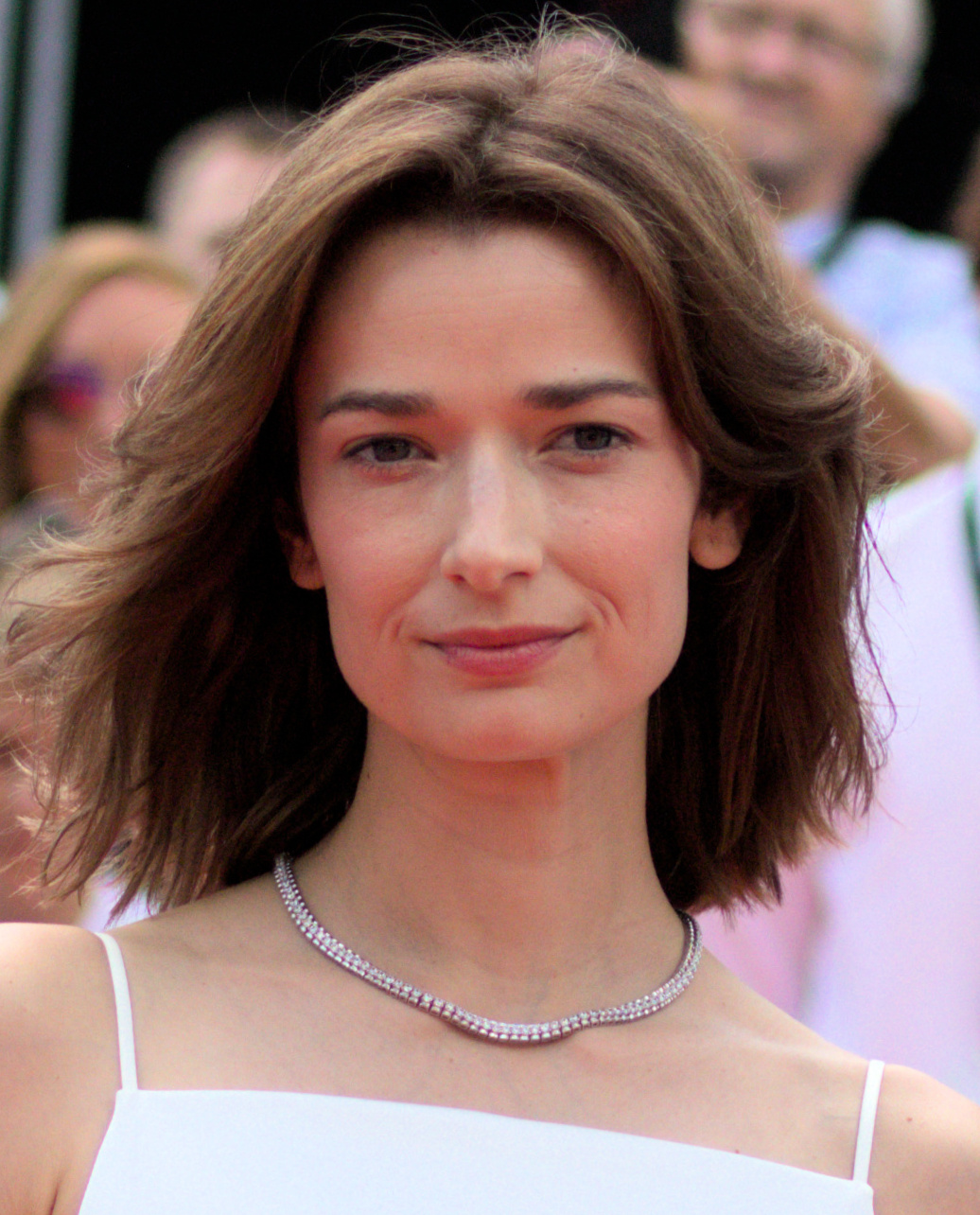
- Šoposká in 2024
- Born: 12 November 1989 (age 35); Havlíčkův Brod, Czechoslovakia
- Occupation: Actress
- Years active: 1997–present

Marika Šoposká (born 12 November 1989 in Havlíčkův Brod) is a Czech actress.

== Selected filmography ==
=== Films ===
- Bába (2008)
- Flower Buds (2011)
- Lidice (2011)
- Můj vysvlečenej deník (2012)
- Jan Hus (2015)
- I, Olga Hepnarová (2016)
- The Play (2019)
- Waves (2024)

=== TV series ===
- Josephine, Guardian Angel (2007)
- Cirkus Bukowsky (2013)
- The First Republic (2014)
- Ordinace v růžové zahradě (2017)
