= Ivana Jirešová =

Czech actress

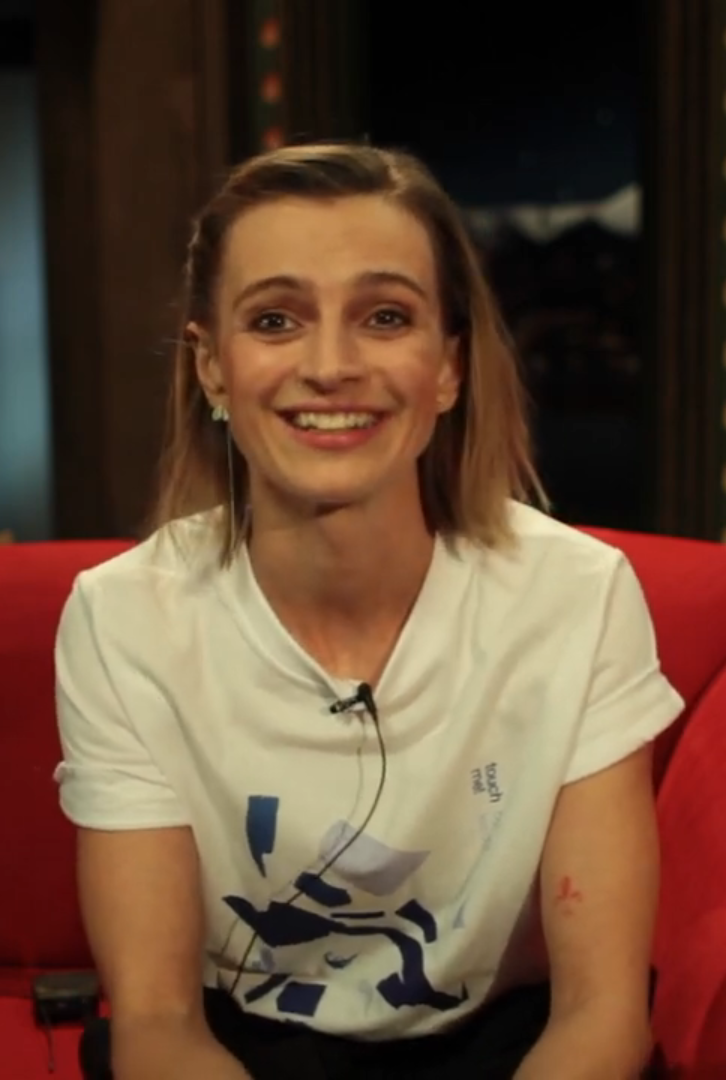
- Born: 15 July 1977 (age 48); Písek, Czechoslovakia (now Czech Republic)
- Occupation: Actress
- Years active: 1993–present

Ivana Jirešová is a Czech television, film and stage actress. She was born 15 July 1977 in Písek, Czechoslovakia. She studied at the State Conservatory in Prague, in the department of Acting. She is in the employment of the F. X. Šalda Theatre, Liberec. She also works as editor of the magazine Harper´s Bazaar. She has a daughter, Sofie Frida Höpner-Jirešová.

== Theatre ==
=== F. X. Šalda Theatre, Liberec ===
- Čechov na Jaltě
- Ondina
- Smutek sluší Elektře
- Kdyby tisíc klarinetů
- Hello, Dolly
- Libanky .... Sibylla Chase (Noël Coward play)
- Veřejné oko .... Belinda

=== J. K. Tyl Theatre, Plzeň ===
- My Fair Lady .... Liza Doolittle

=== Ta Fantastika Theatre, Prague ===
- Excalibur .... Morgana

=== Kalich Theatre, Prague ===
- Jack the Ripper ....
- Splašené nůžky ....

== Filmography ==
- "Ordinace v růžové zahradě" (2005) TV series .... Lucie Hrušková (2005-2009)
- "Přízraky mezí námi" (2001) TV series .... ???
