= Michaela Badinková =

Slovak actress

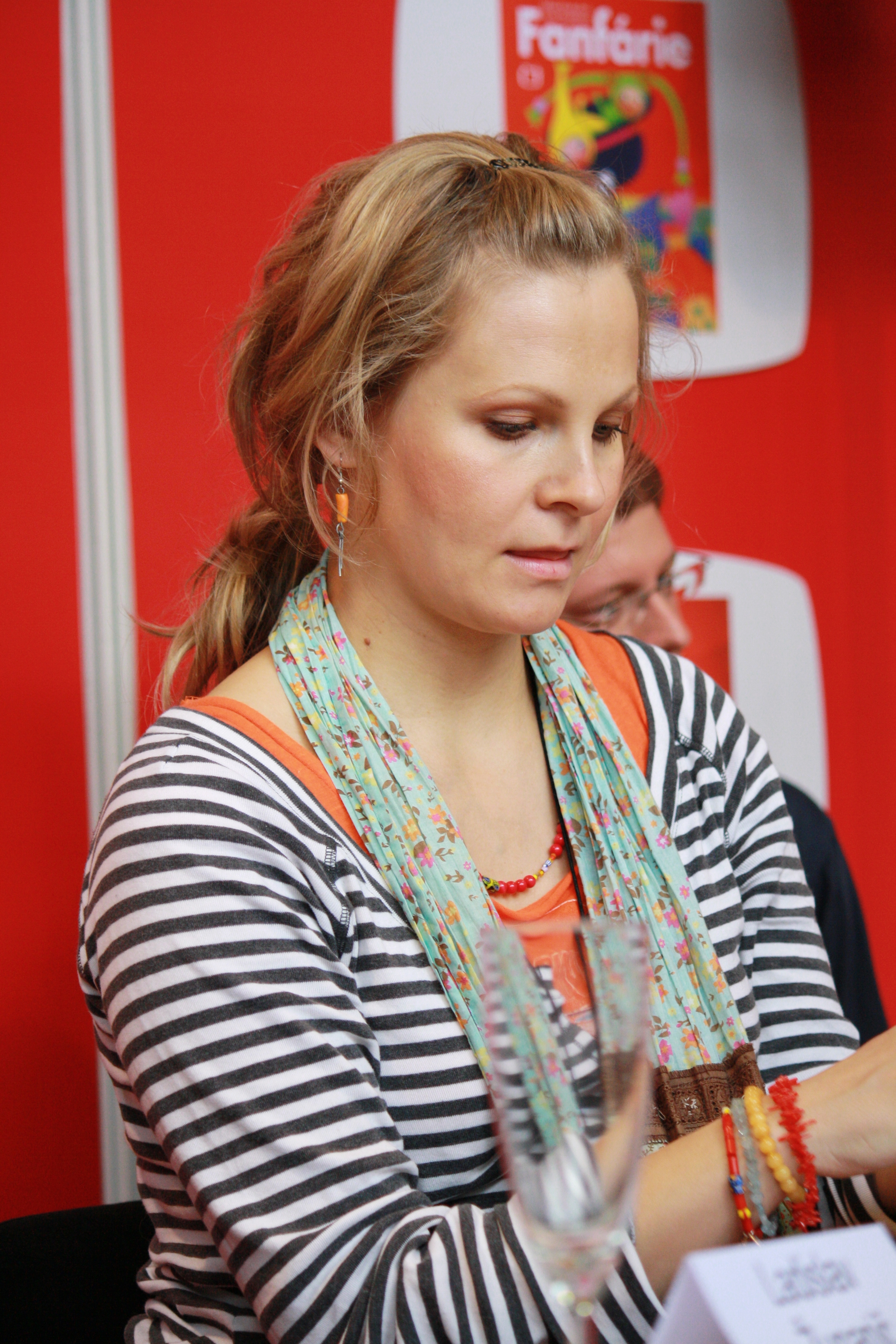
- Michaela Badinková
- Born: 25 January 1979 (age 46); Malacky, Czechoslovakia
- Occupation: Actress
- Years active: 1998–present
- Children: 2

Michaela Badinková (born 25 January 1979) is a Slovak actress.

== Biography ==
Badinková was born in Malacky, Czechoslovakia. She studied Conservatory in Bratislava and Academy of Performing Arts in Prague.

== Theatre ==
=== Divadlo Na Fidlovačce ===
- Megan McCormick .... Meg (Ken Ludwig)
- Balada pro banditu .... Erzsika
- Harvey and me
- Le baruffe chiozzotte .... Checca
- Divotvorný hrnec .... Káča
- Thoroughly Modern Millie .... Millie Dillmount

=== Theatre Disk ===
- Orestes

=== ABC Theatre ===
- Anna Karenina .... Anna Karenina

== Filmography ==
- Karamazovi (2008)
- Velkofilm (2007)
- "Ulice" (2005) TV series .... Lenka Drápalová
- Clochemerle (2004)
- Jak básníci neztrácejí naději (2004) .... Anna Posedlá aka Squrriel
- Juraj Kováč (2001 (TV)
- "The Immortal" (2000) TV series
