= Lucie Borhyová =

Czech presenter

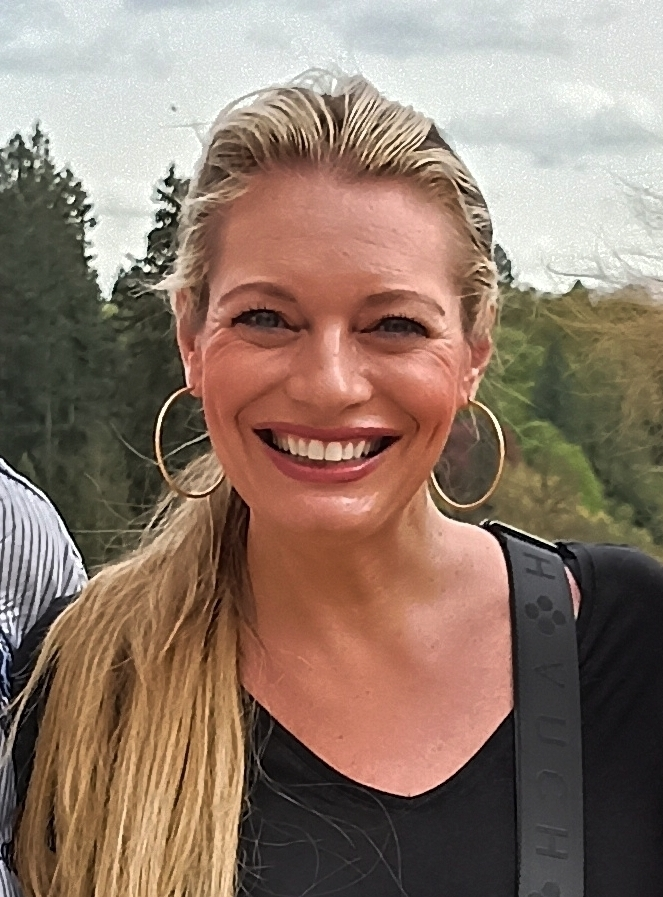
- Borhyová in 2024
- Born: 16 April 1978 (age 47); Prague, Czechoslovakia
- Occupation: TV presenter
- Years active: 1999-present
- Partner: Jaromír Jágr (2004)

Lucie Borhyová (born 16 April 1978) is a Czech television presenter, who reads the news for Czech television channel TV Nova. She started her career in August 1999, having previously worked for Nova as a programme assistant. Borhyová was named "most popular female" in the TV Nova Anno 2007 awards. She was awarded "television news personality of the year" in the TýTý Awards in 2012 and 2013. In 2007 she took part in the celebrity dancing television series, Bailando.

== Personal life ==
Borhyová has a son, Lucas, from a relationship with Nico Papadakis. She also has a daughter, Linda, from a relationship with Michal Hrdlička. Having been together with Hrdlička since 2012, Borhyová announced their split in October 2015.
