= Jana Kirschner =

Slovak singer and songwriter (born 1978)

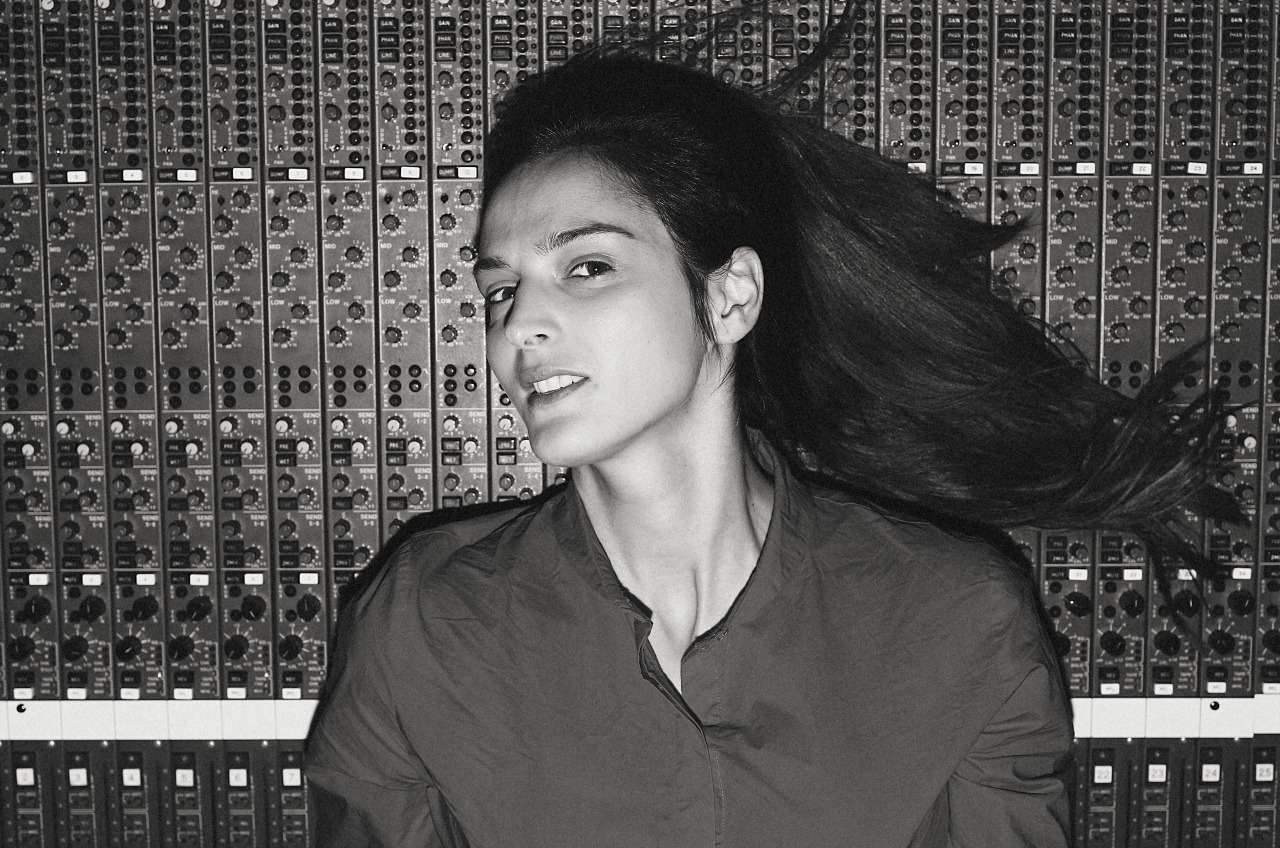
- Kirschner in 2015

Background information
- Born: Jana Kirschnerová; 29 December 1978 (age 47); Martin, Czechoslovakia
- Occupation: Singer-songwriter
- Instruments: Piano; guitar
- Years active: 1996–present
- Labels: Jive; Universal; Slnko
- Website: janakirschner.com

Jana Kirschner (née Kirschnerová, born 29 December 1978) is a Slovak singer and songwriter. She is noted for exploring different music genres.

== Life and career ==
=== Early life ===
Jana Kirschner was born on 29 December 1978 in Martin, Slovakia. As a child, she attended singing and piano classes. At seven years old, Kirschner won the children's singing competition Zlatá guľôčka.

At the age of 17 Kirschner competed in the Miss Slovakia pageant. Later in her career Kirschner said she regretted her foray into modeling because of the focus on staying thin, which led her to develop an eating disorder. She nonetheless acknowledged that the media attention associated with her appearance in the beauty pageant helped her in the beginnings of her music career.

=== 1996 – 1999 V cudzom meste era ===
In 1996 Kirschner released her first album Jana Kirschner under the Polygram/Universal label. The album was only a modest commercial success. Nonetheless, she was noticed by critics and won the New Artist of the Year ZAI Award.

Kirschner's second album V cudzom meste (1999) was the one that launched her career. By the time of its release Kirschner abandoned the innocent romantic image of a former beauty queen by including explicitly sexual lyrics in several songs featured in the album and appearing topless on the title page of the Kankán magazine. V cudzom meste was an undisputed success, four of the songs featured on it became big hits that dominated the national charts and established Kirschner as the "queen" of pop music in Slovakia.

In addition to the commercial success, Kirschner work was lauded by the critics. She received by three ZAI Awards - Album and Music Artist of the Year respectively (1999), and Female Singer of the Year (2000). In 1999, also won the Slávik poll–based award. In 2007, V cudzom meste was declared by the jury of The 100 Greatest Slovak Albums of All Time the best Slovak album recorded by a female singer.

=== 2000 – 2006 Collaborations ===
In 2002 Kirschner released her third album Pelikán followed by her fourth album Veci čo sa dejú in 2003 to mixed reviews. Commercially, both albums were successful and with the passage of time, the critics recognized the quality of Pelikán in particular, placing it among The 100 Greatest Slovak Albums of All Time.

While her solo work failed to reach the heights of V cudzom meste, Kirschner received much acclaim for her collaborations with predominantly Czech musicians. In 2002 she released the single Bude mi lehká zem together with the composer and singer Petr Hapka, which became one of her most recognizable songs and introduced Kirschner to the Czech audience. Building on the success of this collaboration, she appeared in several songs of Hapka's 2006 album Strážce plamene including a duet První noc v novém bytě together with the legendary Czech folk singer Jaromír Nohavica.

Deviating from her image as a pop singer, she teamed up with jazz musicians Peter Lipa and Boboš Procházka to record a blues album Eosphoros in 2005.

In the years 2003 and 2007, she won two Aurel Awards as Female Singer of the Year.

=== 2007 – 2013 Krajina rovina era ===
Kirschner albums released up to 2007 contained occasional English-language songs. Nonetheless, all her big hits were either in Slovak or Czech and thus not accessible to the international audience. In 2007, the Universal Music label representing Kirschner decided to attempt to introduce Kirschner to the international audience and funded the production of her fifth album Shine produced by Ross Cullum, which was recorded in London entirely in English. The album received good reviews and was supported by a series of live performances, including one in the Queen Elizabeth Hall in London. However, it failed to achieve the intended commercial breakthrough and Kirschner future work has been predominantly performed in Slovak.

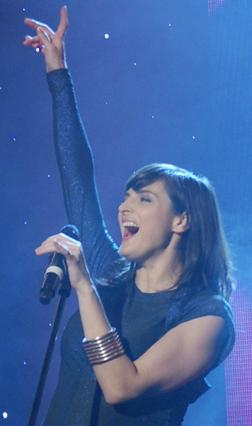
Jana Kirschner performing at the 2010 Crystal Wing Awards

In spite of the lack of success with international audience, Kirschner retained her popularity at home, winning the OTO Awards for best female singer in 2008, 2009, 2010.

In spite of the commercial success of Shine, the stay in London represented a breakthrough in Kirschner's career because it led to a meeting with the producer, musician and composer and arranger Eddie Stevens who because the producer of all future albums released by Kirschner as well as her life partner. The collaboration with Stevens led to the transformation of Kirschner from a pop princess to an alternative rock musician.

The first album released with Stevens as a producent was Krajina rovina recorded in the small town of Hranice in 2010. In spite of overwhelmingly positive reviews, Universal Music was very dissatisfied with Kirschner transformation away from pop music and perceived limited commercial potential of her new artistic direction. Following a highly medialized battle, Universal Music agreed to release Kirschner from her contract in exchange for the return of advance funds paid to Kirschner for the production of Krajina rovina.

Following the release of Krajina rovina Kirschner took a career break due to the birth of her two daughters with Stevens. The pair settled in London.

=== 2014 – present Moruša era ===
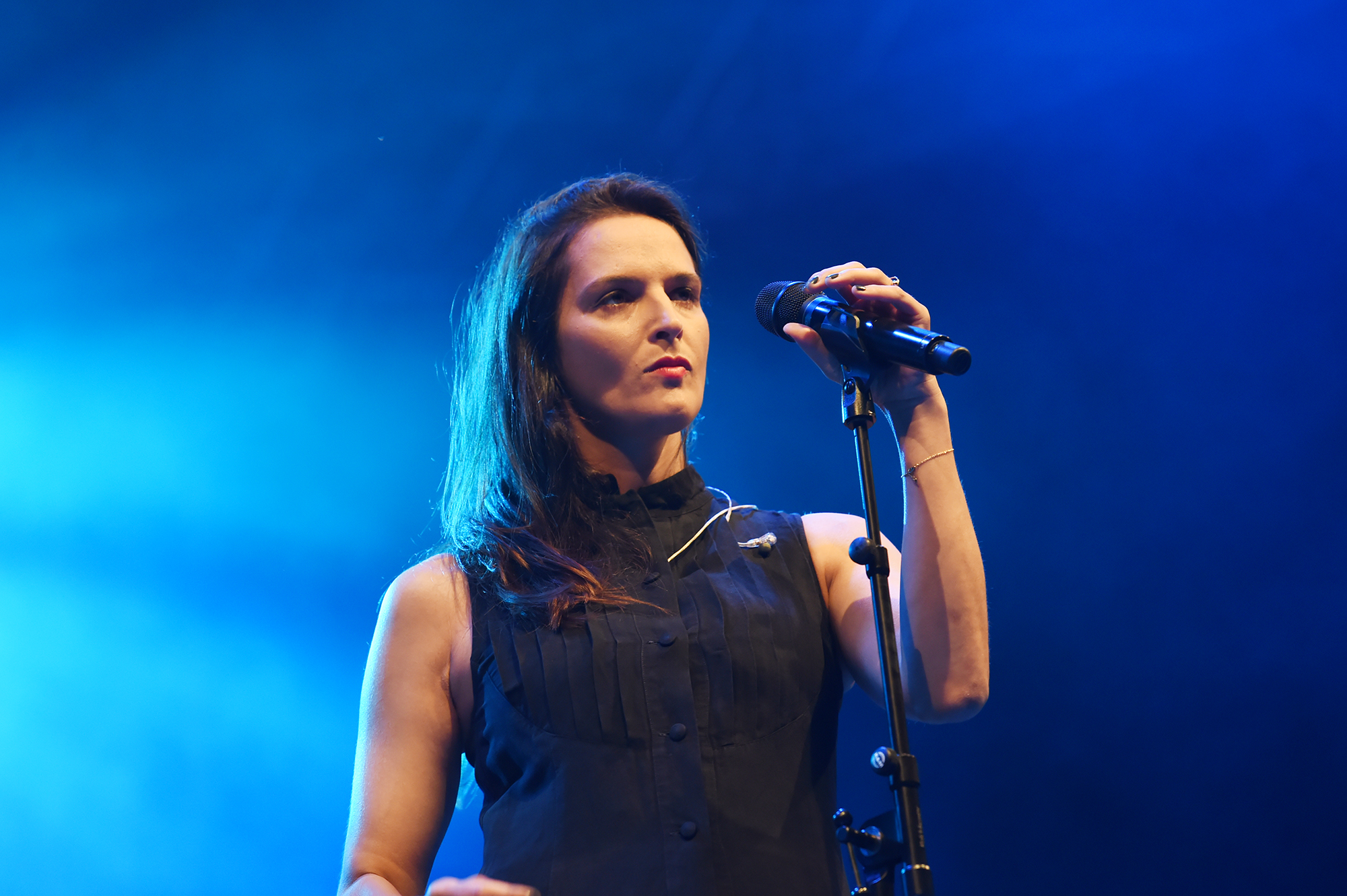
Jana Kirschner performing at the Devín Castle in 2016

Following the break, Kirschner returned under her new label Slnko records. She released a two-album project titled Moruša: Biela and Moruša: Čierna in 2013 and 2014 respectively produced by Stevens. The tracks from both albums were brought to life again in 2015 on the album Moruša: Remixed which contains 12 songs remixed by various producers from Central Europe. In 2016 and 2017 Kirschner released recordings of her live performances Takmer sólo and Živá. Following the hiatus, she abandoned her signature short hair for a more femine image, which was reflected as well in the intimate nature of her lyrics on both albums. The albums were met with a critical and commercial success, earning a double-platinum and a limited vinil release.

In 2018, Kirschner started a collaboration with the band Para, resulting in the single Našou krajinou, followed by Pre tých, čo zostali in 2023. Additionally, she served as a member of the jury in the Czech and Slovak edition of The Voice competition. Together with Stevens, she recorded and performed music for the animated series for children Tresky Plesky.

By the late 2010s, Kirschner became engaged in civil activism, becoming the face of ecological initiatives and headlining the memorial concert for the murdered journalist Ján Kuciak.

In 2024, after nearly ten years since the Moruša project, Kirschner released a new album Obyčajnosti, again produced by Stevens.

== Awards ==
Slávik

Year	Nominated work	Category	Award
1999	Jana Kirscher	Singer of the year	Winner - Golden slávik
2000	Jana Kirscher	Singer of the year	Winner - Golden slávik
2001	Jana Kirscher	Singer of the year	Winner - Golden slávik
2002	Jana Kirscher	Singer of the year	Winner - Golden slávik
2003	Jana Kirscher	Singer of the year	Silver slávik
2004	Jana Kirscher	Singer of the year	Silver slávik
2005	Jana Kirscher	Singer of the year	Bronze slávik
2009	Jana Kirscher	Singer of the year	Silver slávik
2009	Jana Kirscher – „Pokoj v duši“	Hit of the year	Won
2009	Jana Kirscher – „Pokoj v duši“	Rádioslávik (for the most played artist on the radio)	Won
2010	Jana Kirscher	Singer of the year	Bronze slávik

SOZA Awards

Year	Nominated work	Category	Award
1999	Jana Kirschner – „V cudzom meste“	Award for the most successful composition by a young author in the field of popular music	Won
2009	Jana Kirschner – „Pokoj v duši“	Award for the most played song	Won
2014	Jana Kirschner – Moruša biela	Award for the most successful audio recording by Slovak authors	Won
2020	Jana Kirschner	Award for a significant share of presentation of domestic music abroad	Won
2021	Jana Kirschner – „Láska neumiera“	Award for the most played song	Won
2021	Jana Kirschner	Lyricist of the most played musical works	Nominated

Aurel

Year	Nominated work	Category	Award
2003	Jana Kirscher	Best female vocal performance of the year	Won
2003	Jana Kirscher – „Na čiernom koni“	Best song	Won
2007	Jana Kirscher	Best female vocal performance of the year	Won
2007	Ross Cullum – Shine (Jana Kirschner)	Best audio recording	Won

Grand Prix Radio

Year	Nominated work	Category	Award
2004	Jana Kirscher – „Na čiernom koni“	Song of the year	Won
2004	Jana Kirscher	Absolute winner	Won

Panta Rhei Awards

Year	Nominated work	Category	Award
2010	Jana Kirschner – Krajina rovina	The best-selling non-book work of 2010	Nominated
2013	Jana Kirschner – Moruša biela	Top music title of the year	Won

Radio_Head awards

Year	Nominated work	Category	Award
2013	Jana Kirscher – Moruša biela	Album of the year	Nominated
2013	Jana Kirscher – Moruša biela	Album of the year / Critics Award	Won
2013	Jana Kirscher – Moruša biela	Album of the year World music / Folk	Won
2013	Jana Kirscher – „Sama“	Single of the year	Nominated
2013	Jana Kirscher	Concert band / Performer of the year	Nominated
2014	Jana Kirscher – Moruša čierna	Album of the year / Critics Award	Won
2022	Para – „To okolo nás“ (feat. Jana Kirschner & Matej Starkov)	Song of the year	Won

TV Screen Personality (OTO)

Year	Nominated work	Category	Award
2000	Jana Kirschner	Singer of the year	Won
2008	Jana Kirschner	Singer of the year	Won
2009	Jana Kirschner	Singer of the year	Won
2010	Jana Kirschner	Singer of the year	Won

== Discography ==
- Jana Kirschner (1997)
- V cudzom meste (1999)
- Pelikán (2002)
- Veci čo sa dejú (2003)
- Shine (2007)
- Krajina rovina (2010)
- Moruša: Biela (2013)
- Moruša: Čierna (2014)
- Moruša: Remixed (2015)
- Takmer sólo (2016)
- Živá (2017)
- Obyčajnosti (2024)

=== Other appearances ===
- 2006: Strážce plamene with Petr Hapka & Michal Horáček
- 2007: Strážce plamene v obrazech with Hapka & Horáček
- collaborations with many artists : Miroslav Žbirka, Lenka Filipová, Ivan Tásler, Robert Kodym, Jelen, Tomáš Klus, Korben Dallas, Vojtěch Dyk, Jaromír Nohavica, Lucie Bílá, Para, Peter Lipa and others

== See also ==
- The 100 Greatest Slovak Albums of All Time
