= Strážce plamene v obrazech =

Video by Petr Hapka & Michal Horáček
- Released: May 28, 2007
- Genre: Folk, jazz, pop, rock, chanson
- Label: Universal Music (#173 481-2)
- Director: Jaromír Pesr, Jan Budař, Tomáš Hodan, Jakub Sommer, Cyril Podolský, Martin Dolenský, Mirjam Landa, Ondřej Beránek, Otakar Vávra
- Producer: Michal Horáček; Ondřej Beránek (Punk Film); Lukáš Záhoř (SP2)

Strážce plamene v obrazech (The Flamekeeper in Pictures) is a video album by Czech recording artists Petr Hapka and Michal Horáček, released on Universal Music in 2007.

== Track listing ==
All lyrics are written by Michal Horáček; all music is composed by Petr Hapka

| No. | Title | Featured artist(s) | Length |
|---|---|---|---|
| 1. | "První noc v novém bytě" (directed by Jaromír Pesr) | Jaromír Nohavica & Jana Kirschner | 4:16 |
| 2. | "Otevřete okno, aby duše mohla ven" (directed by Jan Budař) | Daniel Landa & Bára Basiková | 3:47 |
| 3. | "Strážce plamene" (directed by Tomáš Hodan) | František Segrado | 4:09 |
| 4. | "Vidoucí, ale neviděná" (directed by Jakub Sommer) | Jana Kirschner | 4:00 |
| 5. | "Neodolatelná" (directed by Cyril Podolský) | Jaromír Nohavica | 3:37 |
| 6. | "Kdo by se díval nazpátek" (directed by Martin Dolenský) | Hana Hegerová | 3:10 |
| 7. | "Na hotelu v Olomouci" (directed by Cyril Podolský) | Szidi Tobias | 3:59 |
| 8. | "Díkůvzdání" (directed by Mirjam Landa) | Daniel Landa | 5:14 |
| 9. | "Sněžná sova" (directed by Martin Dolenský) | Jana Kirschner | 4:23 |
| 10. | "Nemůžeš usnout III." (directed by Ondřej Beránek) | Petr Hapka | 2:55 |
| 11. | "Hlava kance" (directed by Otakar Vávra) | František Segrado | 3:33 |
| Total length: | | | 43:03 |

Behinde the Scene
| No. | Title | Length |
|---|---|---|
| 12. | "Strážce plamene kamerou Jana Mudry" (document) |

== Credits and personnel ==
- Michal Horáček - lyrics, producer
- Petr Hapka - music, producer, lead vocal

- Michal Pekárek - producer, remix, engineer, mastering
- Daniel Závorka - executive producer
- Jaromír Pesr - director
- Jan Budař - director
- Tomáš Hodan - director
- Jakub Sommer - director
- Cyril Podolský - director
- Martin Dolenský - director
- Mirjam Landa - director
- Ondřej Beránek - director, producer
- Otakar Vávra - director
- Lukáš Záhoř - producer
- Jaromír Nohavica - lead vocal
- Jana Kirschner - lead vocal
- Daniel Landa - lead vocal
- Bára Basiková - lead vocal
- Hana Hegerová - lead vocal
- František Segrado - lead vocal
- Szidi Tobias - lead vocal
- Mona Martinů - photography

== Charts ==
| Chart (2007) | Peak position |
|---|---|
| Czech Video Chart | 2 |
| Czech Albums Chart | 13 |

== See also ==
- Strážce plamene (CD release)
