= Nohavica =

Nohavica (feminine: Nohavicová) is a surname. Notable people with the surname include:

- Jaromír Nohavica (born 1953), Czech musician
- Roman Nohavica (born 1974), Czech footballer

== See also ==
- Nohavica family
