= Epiphany Proclamation =

Epiphany proclamation may refer to:

- Epiphany proclamation (religion), an annual declaration of the dates of Christian moveable feasts
- Epiphany proclamation (politics), a 2013 political declaration associated with the Czech presidential election
