= Bára Nesvadbová =

Czech writer and journalist

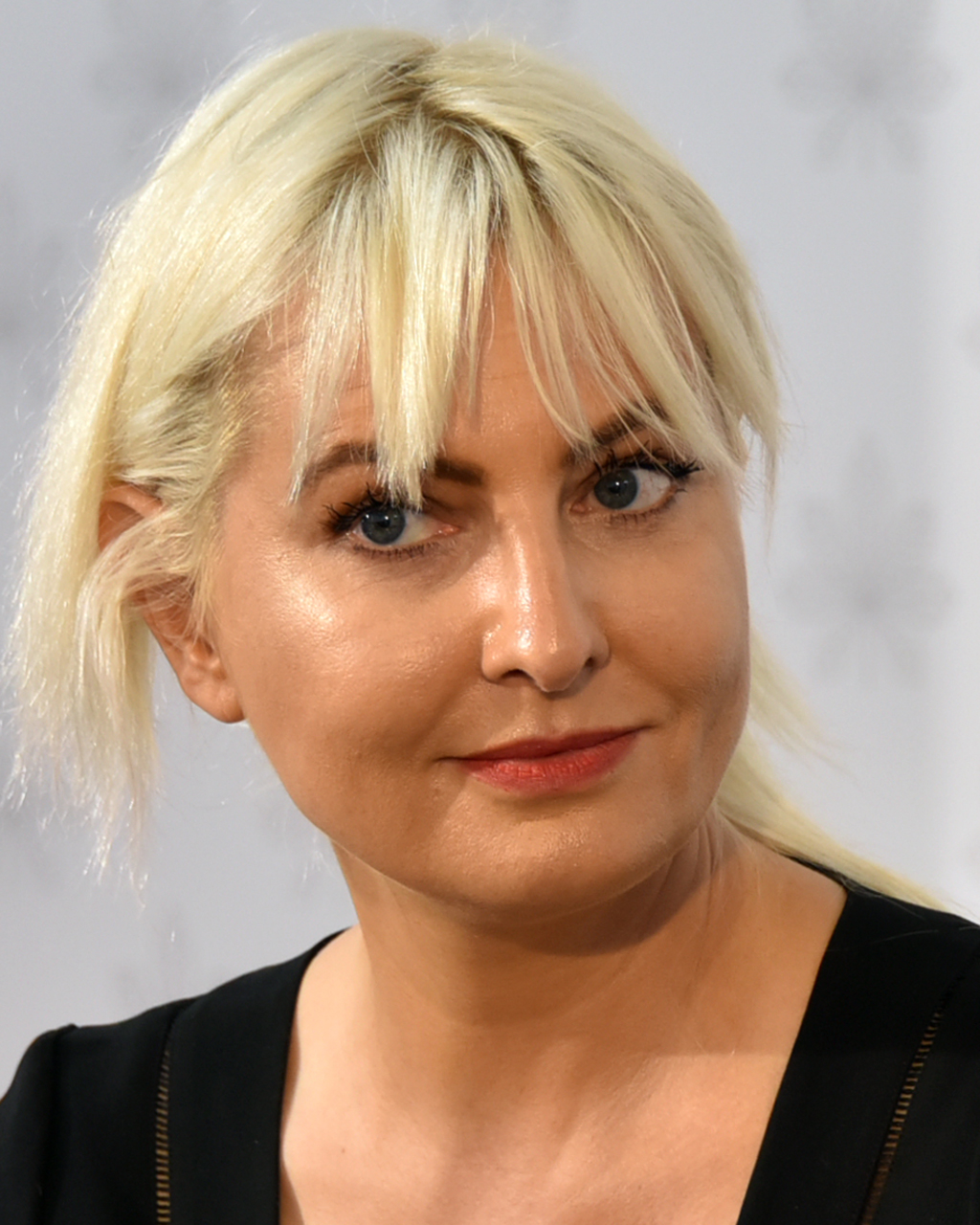
- Bára Nesvadbová in 2019
- Born: Barbara Nesvadbová; 14 January 1975 (age 51); Prague, Czechoslovakia
- Occupations: Writer, journalist

Bára Nesvadbová (born Barbara Nesvadbová; 14 January 1975) is a Czech writer and journalist.

== Biography ==
Nesvadbová was born in Prague on 14 January 1975 into a family of doctors, both psychiatrists. Mother Libuše Nesvadbová is involved with assisting immigrants and ethnic minorities. Her father Josef Nesvadba was known as an author of sci-fi literature. Nesvadbová's ex-husband is the politician Karel Březina with whom she has a daughter Bibiana Nesvadbová. Nesvadbová has a degree in journalism and mass communication from the Faculty of Social Sciences at Charles University in Prague. She started working as editor-in-chief of Xantypa and later Playboy. Currently, she is editor-in-chief of the Czech edition of the prestigious fashion magazine Harper's Bazaar.

== Literary career ==
While at university, Nesvadbová had already started working with publisher Romana Přidalová. Until then, she had written short essays and sketches which were later all linked through one character, and became short stories. This resulted in her first book, Řízkaři ("Schnitzellers"), which deals with sex, relationships and a young journalist named Karla who is trying to find her way. Nesvadbová's second book, Bestiář ("Bestiary"), officially proclaimed one of the most-borrowed library books, became the basis for the eponymous movie where the main characters were played by Danica Jurčová, Karel Roden and Marek Vašut. The movie was directed by the Czech director Irena Pavlásková. Nesvadbová co-wrote the script. Her next books followed fast: Život nanečisto ("Life as a Draft"); Pohádkář ("Storyteller") which became a movie in 2014 with Jiří Macháček and Eva Herzigová playing the main characters; a collection of short sketches Brusinky ("Cranberries"); and a short story collection, Borůvky ("Blueberries"). In between, Nesvadbová wrote a cheerful children's book dedicated to her daughter Bibiana called Garpíškoviny aneb Bibi a čtyři kočky ("A Very Merry Dog's Life or Bibi and Four Cats"). In 2013, Bára Nesvadbová published the book Přítelkyně ("Female Friends"), two novellas about women’s friendship. In 2014, she published another collection of sketches called Pralinky ("Pralines").

== Charity projects ==
The writer is regularly involved in many and various charitable projects; she actively supports the non-profit organization Etincelle, where she is a member on the board of directors. She also actively supports Habitat Zahrada v Kladně for mentally handicapped clients. Further, Nesvadbová supports Unicef, the organization Dobrý Anděl and Helppes. In addition, Nesvadbová is a founder of the Bazaar Charity endowment which financially supports the rehabilitation of handicapped people.

== Work ==
=== Books ===
- Řízkaři (2006, Motto, Albatros) ISBN 9788026714194.
- Bestiář (2007, Motto, Albatros)
- Život na nečisto (2008, Motto, Albatros)
- Brusinky (2011, Brána; 2015, Motto, Albatros)
- Pohádkář (2011, Motto, Albatros)
- Garpíškoviny aneb Bibi a čtyři kočky (2011, Brána; 2015, Motto, Albatros)
- Borůvky (2012, Brána)
- Tři maminky a tatínek (2012, co-authored with Alena Ježková and Natálie Kocábová; Brio)
- Přítelkyně (2013, Motto, Albatros)
- Pralinky (2014, Motto, Albatros)

=== Audiobooks ===
- Bestiář (2008, Popron Music & Publishing; narrated by Jitka Čvančarová)
- Pohádkář (2011,2014, Motto, Albatros; narrated by Táňa Vilhelmová)
- Brusinky (2011, Motto, Albatros; narrated by Ivana Jirešová and Markéta Hrubešová)
- Pralinky (2015, Motto, Albatros; narrated by Bára Nesvadbová)
- Garpíškoviny aneb Bibi a čtyři kočky (2015, Motto, Albatros; narrated by Martin Dejdar)

=== Screenplays ===
- Bestiář (2007; directed by Irena Pavlásková)
- Pohádkář (2014; directed by Vladimír Michálek)
