= Natálie Kocábová =

Czech poet, writer, and musician

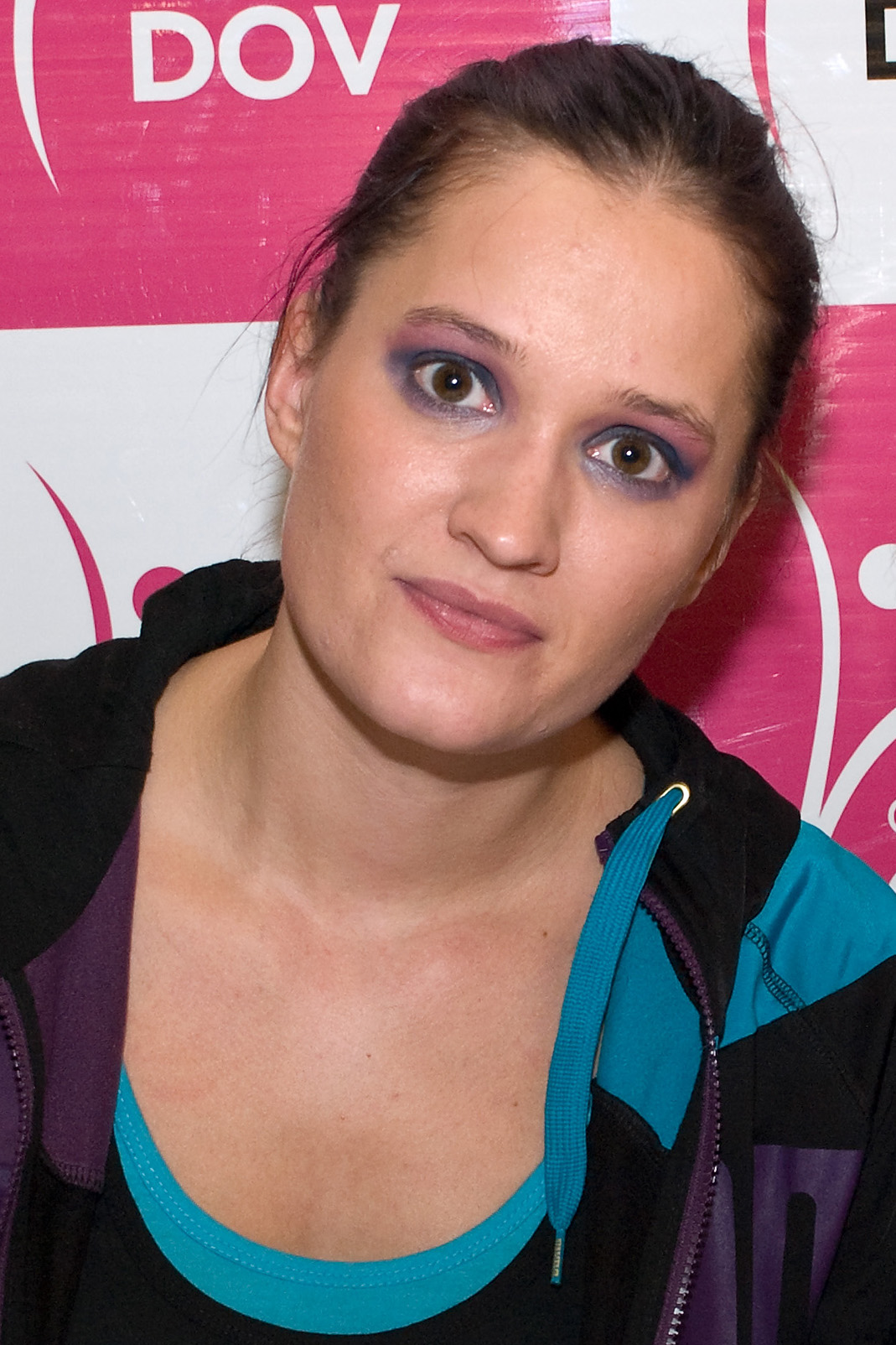
- Born: Natálie Kocábová; May 16, 1984 (age 42); Prague, Czechoslovakia
- Other names: Natalie C. Kocab; Natália Kocábová
- Education: FAMU, Prague, Czech Republic
- Occupations: Poet, writer, musician
- Years active: 2000–present
- Employer: XYZ (screenwriter-editor)
- Spouse: Štěpán Vrána (m. 2001–2015)
- Parent(s): Michael Kocáb (July 28, 1954); Marsha Crews (May 26, 1954)
- Website: www.nataliekocab.cz

Natálie Kocábová (Czech pronunciation: [ˈnataːlɪjɛ ˈkotsaːbovaː]), also known as Natalie Kocab (born 16 May 1984) is a Czech poet, writer, and musician. She is the daughter of singer and political activist Michael Kocáb. She has released three solo studio albums, one extended play, four music videos, and featured on a number of other projects.

== Early life ==
Natálie Kocábová was born on 16 May 1984 in Prague, Czechoslovakia. Her father, Michael Kocáb, was a singer and political activist. Her mother is an American, of British ancestry.

== Career ==
Kocábová received her first exposure at the age of eleven by providing vocals for low-budget albums by Dagmar Patrasová, Baby studio s Dádou (1995) and Vánoce s Dádou (1996), both designed for children. Shortly before her debut release, she was credited as a co-writer on a track entitled "Some People" that appeared on the album Velvet Revolution (1999), by Michael Kocáb, Petr Kolář and Tomáš Kympl. Her debut Fly Apple Pie was released on January 9, 2000, through Epic Records in partnership with Sony BMG. The album was the first full-length record issued by a Czech artist in the 2000s, and featured fifteen tracks mainly in English, all composed by her father Michael Kocáb, whose name also appeared on the cover. Her mother, Marsha, also supplied lyrics. Upon its release, the album was negatively received by critics, some of whom labelled it as a shallow marketing tactic from Kocáb and others accused his daughter of nepotism. Two music videos were produced, for the tracks "So Changes Go" and "Mayday", but the constant negative publicity hurt the album's sales.

In following years, Kocábová focused on writing poems and short novels. Her subsequent written works included Slyšíš mě? (2002), Monarcha Absint (2003), Schola Alternativa (2004) and Někdo je v domě (2005). She was cast in the musical theatre production Starci na chmelu (2001/02), and also contributed vocals to her father's album Za kyslík (2002). Her second studio album, Hummingbirds in Iceland, was released on 12 June 2006, again distributed via Sony BMG and supervised by Kocáb. Other songwriters and producers who worked on the album included Michal Pavlíček Jr, Michaela Poláková and Lukáš Máchal. The album was promoted by a video, for "Neverland", and received favorable reviews from journalists, who especially acknowledged its "progressive sound"; other critics repeated their previous criticisms.

Kocábová published a novel called Růže: Cesta za světlem... in 2007, and in 2008, she contributed the opening track "Tramtárie" to an all-female compilation Ohrožený druh by Michal Horáček, also on Sony BMG. From 2009 she began collecting material for her next studio album. However, Walking on the A-bomb, produced by Jiří Burian, was rejected by Sony. After Kocábová signed a distribution deal with music magazine Report, the record was released in a cardboard sleeve on 1 December 2010, and was followed by a small venue tour.

In January 2026, Kocáb, together with Czech journalist and hybrid propaganda expert Alexandra Alvarová, founded the bilingual media and journalistic project Radio Free America, inspired by Radio Free Europe. The project's stated aim was to build a bridge between European and American information spaces, explain U.S. politics to European audiences and vice versa, and combat disinformation and hybrid propaganda. Launched through a crowdfunding campaign, it focused primarily on strengthening transatlantic relations and democratic values amid growing polarization.

== Discography ==
Kocábová's discography consists of three solo studio albums, one extended play, four music videos and a number of other appearances.

=== Albums ===
==== Studio albums ====
Year	Album details	Notes
2000	Fly Apple Pie with Michael Kocáb^{[A]}: Released: January 9, 2000; Label: Epic/Sony BMG (#EPC 496585 2); Format: CD	Fifteen track album sung in English with exception of "ABC", "Kapka lásky and the final song "Duch Tarantina" that was in addition attached to Kocáb's double retrospective collection Best Of (2008), issued on Daranus.
2006	Hummingbirds in Iceland^{[B]}: Released: June 12, 2006; Label: Sony BMG; Format: CD	Fourteen track album sung exclusively in English.
2010	Walking on the A-bomb^{[B]}: Released: December 1, 2010; Label: Biotech/Report; Format: MC, CD	Thirteen track album, also sung exclusively in English.
2016	Ellis Island with Michaela Poláková^{[C]}: Released: April 29, 2016; Label: WM Czech Republic; Format: CD	Ten track album sung in English, with the exception of “Žádnej kód”.; Nick McCabe and Fernando Saunders cooperated on the album.
None of the studio albums charted on the Czech Albums Chart.

- A Credited as Natalie Kocábová and Michael Kocáb.
- B Credited as Natalie Kocab.
- C Credited as Natalie Kocab and Michaela Poláková.

=== Extended plays ===
Year	EP details	Notes
2010	Walking on the A-bomb^{[B]}: Released: May 21, 2010; Label: Biotech (party sale only); Format: MC	Six track EP released exclusively on cassette, presenting material from the corresponding studio album of the same title.

- B Credited as Natalie Kocab.

=== Other appearances ===
Year	Song details	Role	Notes
1995	"Aha, aha (Intro)"^{[C]}	back vocal	Early compositions recorded for Baby studio s Dádou by Dagmar Patrasová, released on CD by Bonton. Apart from Orchestr Felixe Slováčka, "Aha, aha" and "My budeme cvičit" featured also her sister Jessica Kocábová. "Ten tvůj táta" included contributions by Bohumil Kulínský and Bambini di Praga.
1995	"My budeme cvičit"^{[C]}	back vocal	Early compositions recorded for Baby studio s Dádou by Dagmar Patrasová, released on CD by Bonton. Apart from Orchestr Felixe Slováčka, "Aha, aha" and "My budeme cvičit" featured also her sister Jessica Kocábová. "Ten tvůj táta" included contributions by Bohumil Kulínský and Bambini di Praga.
1995	"Ten tvůj táta"^{[C]}	back vocal	Early compositions recorded for Baby studio s Dádou by Dagmar Patrasová, released on CD by Bonton. Apart from Orchestr Felixe Slováčka, "Aha, aha" and "My budeme cvičit" featured also her sister Jessica Kocábová. "Ten tvůj táta" included contributions by Bohumil Kulínský and Bambini di Praga.
1995	"Aha, aha (Outro)"^{[C]}	back vocal	Early compositions recorded for Baby studio s Dádou by Dagmar Patrasová, released on CD by Bonton. Apart from Orchestr Felixe Slováčka, "Aha, aha" and "My budeme cvičit" featured also her sister Jessica Kocábová. "Ten tvůj táta" included contributions by Bohumil Kulínský and Bambini di Praga.
1996	"Kapka lásky"^{[C]}	back vocal	A song initially recorded for the Christmas set Vánoce s Dádou by Patrasová, featuring Orchestr Felixe Slováčka, Jessica, Kulínský and Bambini di Praga.
1999	"Some People"^{[B]}	co-writer	A song written by Kocábová and Tomáš Kympl for Velvet Revolution by Kocáb, Petr Kolář and Kympl, released on MC/CD by Popron.
2002	"Život je Nářez"^{[C]}	back vocal	Four tracks recorded during the Za kyslík album sessions for Kocáb, released on CD by Columbia. (In addition, "Urnovej háj" also appeared on second disc of the Kocáb's greatest hits compilation Best Of: Noční vyprávění o mé cestě od kostelní židle až k Pražskému výběru II (2008), issued on Daranus.)
2002	"Urnovej háj"^{[C]}	back vocal	Four tracks recorded during the Za kyslík album sessions for Kocáb, released on CD by Columbia. (In addition, "Urnovej háj" also appeared on second disc of the Kocáb's greatest hits compilation Best Of: Noční vyprávění o mé cestě od kostelní židle až k Pražskému výběru II (2008), issued on Daranus.)
2002	"Noční můra"^{[C]}	back vocal	Four tracks recorded during the Za kyslík album sessions for Kocáb, released on CD by Columbia. (In addition, "Urnovej háj" also appeared on second disc of the Kocáb's greatest hits compilation Best Of: Noční vyprávění o mé cestě od kostelní židle až k Pražskému výběru II (2008), issued on Daranus.)
2002	"Dj Makakaka"^{[C]}	back vocal	Four tracks recorded during the Za kyslík album sessions for Kocáb, released on CD by Columbia. (In addition, "Urnovej háj" also appeared on second disc of the Kocáb's greatest hits compilation Best Of: Noční vyprávění o mé cestě od kostelní židle až k Pražskému výběru II (2008), issued on Daranus.)
2008	"Tramtárie"	lead vocal	The opening track delivered for Michal Horáček's compilation Ohrožený druh^{[D]}, released on CD by Sony BMG.

- B Credited as Natalie Kocab.
- C Credited as Natálka Kocábová.
- D topped at number 1 on the Czech Albums Chart. The set became the most selling album of a music band in the Czech Republic with the sale of 22,766 copies. As of 2011, its total sale reached 35,000 units, while being certified with double platinum from ČNS IFPI. In addition, the work won the Anděl Award as the Album of the Year.

=== Videos ===
==== Music videos ====
Year	Song	Director(s)	Producer	Album
2000	"Mayday"			Fly Apple Pie
2000	"So Changes Go"			Fly Apple Pie
2006	"Neverland"	David "Havran" Spáčil		Hummingbirds in Iceland
2011	"Backyard"			Walking on the A-bomb
2011	"The Pillow" by Republic of Two	Jiří Burian, Mikoláš Růžička	Eliška Nováková	Raising the Flag^{[E]}

- E The album won the Best New Artist category at the Anděl Awards in 2010. (The album charted at number 23.)

== Bibliography ==
Year	Title	Release details		
Year	Title	Publisher	ISBN	Notes
2002	Slyšíš mě?	Mladá fronta	—N/a	poems
2003	Monarcha Absint	Mladá fronta	978-80-20410-16-0	novella
2004	Schola Alternativa	Mladá fronta	978-80-20411-02-0	novella
2005	Někdo je v domě	Mladá fronta	978-80-20412-64-5	poems
2007	Růže: Cesta za světlem...^{[A]}	Mladá fronta	978-80-20415-92-9	novella
2010	The Dark Side of Prague	Větrné mlýny	978-80-74430-24-4	poems
2010	Tři maminky a tatínek^{[B]}	Brio	978-80-86113-96-8	children's book
2011	Na rohu světa	Divadlo Puls	—	play
2012	Rabbit Run (in production)	—N/a	—N/a	comedy
2014	Tohle byl můj pokoj	Argo	978-80-257-1250-4	novel
2017	Pohřeb až zítra	—N/a	—N/a	play
2019	Nepatrně smutná žena	Listen	978-80-7617-899-1	feuilletons, essay
2020	Domů	CPress	978-80-264-3274-6	novel

Notes

- A The limited edition of the work, featuring 999 copies released in 2010, included graphics by her spouse Štěpán Vrána.
- B Credited as co-writer; along with Alena Ježková, Barbara Nesvadbová and Jaromír Švejdík (aka Jaromír 99).

== Stageography ==
- 2002: Starci na chmelu (musical theatre; as Hanka)

== Awards ==
=== Music polls ===
Český slavík by Mattoni, Czech Republic

Year	Nominated work	Category	Result
2000	Herself	Female Singer	#64
2003	Herself	Female Singer	#97
2004	Herself	Female Singer	#60

Žebřík by Report, Czech Republic

Year	Nominated work	Category	Result
2001	Herself	Female Singer → Domestic	#20
2002	Herself	Female Singer → Domestic	#19

== See also ==
- Michael Kocáb
