= Milionář (song) =

2003 song performed by Jaromír Nohavica

Single by Jaromír Nohavica

from the album Babylon
- Released: 2003
- Recorded: 2003
- Genre: Folk
- Length: 4:21
- Songwriter: Jaromír Nohavica
- Producer: Jaromír Nohavica

Jaromír Nohavica singles chronology
"Pochod eskymaku" (2003)	"Milionář" (2003)	"Nic moc" (2003)

"Milionerzy"

Single by Jaromír Nohavica

from the album Babylon
- Released: 2003
- Recorded: 2003
- Genre: Folk
- Length: 4:34
- Songwriter: Jaromír Nohavica
- Producer: Jaromír Nohavica

Jaromír Nohavica singles chronology
"Prevez mi, priteli" (2003)	"Milionerzy" (2003)

Milionář (English translation: Millionaire) is a single by the popular Czech singer Jaromír Nohavica. The song is about Franta Šiška, a native of Dolní Lomná. It was realized in two versions: Czech and Polish (entitled Milionerzy).

The song tells the story of Franta Šiška, whose friend told him to play Who Wants to Be a Millionaire? (Milionář/Milionerzy). He went to the studio, won Fastest Finger First and got to the first question, which was "What is a ukulele?". First, he used phone a friend, but his friend was drunk and didn't know the answer. Then he used fifty fifty and next - ask the audience, 90% of the audience was saying the correct answer - Hawaii instrument. Franta chose the correct answer and won 1,000 korun. Then, without even looking at the second question he decided to resign from playing. At the end, Franta says he'll use his money to buy a ticket back his home town, Ostrava and he will give the rest to homeless people.

The song contains some dialectal and vulgar words.

== Release history ==
Country	Date	Version
Czech	2003	Czech
Polish	2007	Polish
