= Epiphany proclamation =

Epiphany proclamation (Czech: Výzva tříkrálová) was a petition initiative to support Karel Schwarzenberg's presidential candidature. It was issued on 2 January 2013. It was signed by more than 100 personalities and celebrities. It was initiated by Michael Kocáb. Signatory members included Ladislav Špaček, Jaroslav Hutka, Miloš Forman, Věra Čáslavská, Jan Tříska, Jan Ruml and others. The proclamation was also connected to the family of former Czech president Václav Havel, whose legacy it aimed to support. More than 500 personalities signed the proclamation.

== Second proclamation ==
A second proclamation was issued on 21 January, following the advancement of Schwarzenberg to the second round. Authors were Michael Kocáb, Ivan Gabal, Jan Ruml and Fedor Gál. It was signed by more than 20 personalities. Signatory members included Zdeněk Svěrák, Eliška Wagnerová, Michal Horáček and others. Proclamation supporters stated that they wanted a president who would unite the nation. Second proclamation was followed by petition of scientists and medics that was signed by more than 2,800 people.

== Kroměříž proclamation ==
One of Epiphany proclamation's authors, Michael Kocáb, initiated the Kroměříž proclamation in 2016 to find a candidate that would defeat incumbent Miloš Zeman in 2018.
