= Tak to chodí =

Compilation album by Michal Horáček and Jarda Svoboda
- Released: Spring 2003
- Genre: Folk; jazz; pop; rock; chanson
- Length: 41:02
- Label: B&M Music
- Producer: Michal Horáček

Michal Horáček chronology
Mohlo by tu být i líp (2001)	Tak to chodí (2003)	Strážce plamene (2006)

Tak to chodí (So It Goes) is a compilation album by Czech recording artists Michal Horáček and Jarda Svoboda, released on B&M Music in 2003.

After a series of album projects recorded exclusively in collaboration with Petr Hapka, Horáček decided to release a compilation with Svoboda. Their collaboration began after Hapka turned down a number of Horáček's lyrics, which the composer "resolutely had kept refusing to set to his own music". Commercially, the final result was viewed as a failure, appearing on the Czech Albums at number #43 in 2009 and remaining there for only week. The album, however, helped promote several artists, such as Szidi Tobias and František Segrado, at that time noticed only by those involved in the music genre. In 2010, music critic Josef Vlček ranked the set as the best Czech album of the 2000s (decade).

== Track listing ==
All lyrics are written by Michal Horáček; all music is composed by Jarda Svoboda.

No.	Title	Featured artist(s)	Length
1.	"Pátek podvečer"	Jarda Svoboda	2:35
2.	"Praha"	František Segrado	4:17
3.	"Sněžný muž Yetti"	Ivana Chýlková	2:51
4.	"Kirké"	Szidi Tobias	4:14
5.	"Něco hezkého"	František Segrado	3:55
6.	"Doktore, souží mě starost"	Věra Nerušilová	3:11
7.	"Obchodníci s deštěm"	Jarda Svoboda	4:06
8.	"Nemůžeš usnout?"	Milan Vyskočáni	5:27
9.	"Tak to chodí"	Ivana Chýlková	3:36
10.	"Pes jitrničku sežral"	Jarda Svoboda, Jan Spálený & František Segrado	2:56
11.	"Abraham a Sára vybírají DESET SPRAVEDLIVÝCH na okrese Sodoma-Východ"	Jan Spálený & Szidi Tobias	2:11
12.	"Tak dobře, ještě chvíli"	Szidi Tobias	1:43
Total length:			41:02

Notes

- All songs performed in Czech.

== Credits and personnel ==
- Michal Horáček – lyrics, producer
- Jarda Svoboda – music, producer, lead vocal
- František Segrado – lead vocal
- Ivana Chýlková – lead vocal
- Szidi Tobias – lead vocal
- Věra Nerušilová – lead vocal
- Milan Vyskočáni – lead vocal, producer, mix, mastering
- Jan Spálený – lead vocal, producer
- Miroslav Šibík – mix, mastering, engineer
- Michal Pekárek – engineer

== Charts ==
Chart (2009)	Peak position
Czech Albums Chart	43
