= Džamila Stehlíková =

Kazakh-Czech doctor, politician and educator (born 1962)

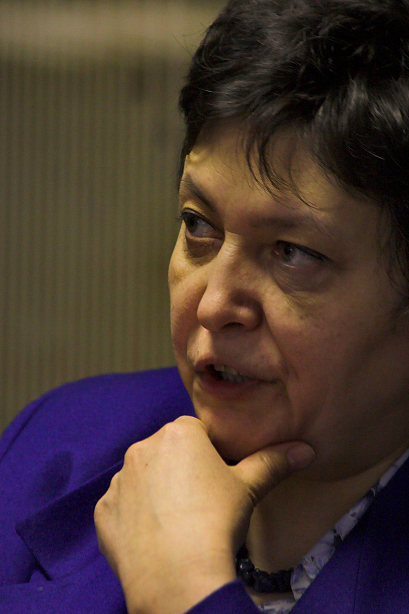

Minister for Human Rights and Minorities
- In office 9 January 2007 – 23 January 2009
- Prime Minister: Mirek Topolánek
- Succeeded by: Michael Kocáb

Personal details
- Born: 6 February 1962 (age 64) Almaty, Kazakh SSR, Soviet Union
- Party: Green Party

Džamila Stehlíková (Kazakh: Жәмилә Алмасқызы Стеһликова), née Ordabayeva (born 6 February 1962, in Almaty) is a Kazakh-born Czech politician and a doctor. She is a member of the Czech Green Party (Czech Green Party), and was the Minister for Human Rights and Minorities from 2007 to 2009.

Stehlíková is a naturalized Czech citizen by marriage. On 17 February 1992, Stehlíková was sworn in as a Czech citizen.
