= List of Rupert episodes =

This is a list of episodes for the traditionally animated children's television series Rupert, which was produced by Nelvana and originally broadcast on YTV. During the course of the series, 65 episodes of Rupert aired over five seasons, between September 7, 1991, and June 19, 1997.

== Series overview ==
Season	Episodes	Originally released	
Season	Episodes	First released	Last released
1	13	7 September 1991	23 November 1991
2	13	13 September 1992	9 December 1992
3	13	3 March 1994	26 May 1994
4	13	3 September 1995	26 November 1995
5	13	27 March 1997	19 June 1997

== Episodes ==
=== Season 1 (1991) ===
No. overall	No. in season	Title	Written by	Storyboarded by	Original release date
1	1	"Rupert and Pong Ping"	Peter Sauder	Ray Jafelice	7 September 1991
When Rupert and Pong Ping journey to China, the Emperor's pet dragon becomes jealous of Pong Ping and has him kidnapped by a ferocious fire-breathing relative. Rupert rescues Pong Ping, and seals the friendship between the Emperor and his pet dragon.
2	2	"Rupert and the Sage of Um"	Bruce Robb	Brian Lee	8 September 1991
When the Great Enchanter, a young magician Rupert's age, threatens the last herd of unicorns, Rupert and his friend Tiger Lily fly to mythical Um Island. There they not only help a timid young unicorn learn to stand up to her problems, but teach the young magician a lesson about growing up.
3	3	"Rupert and Algy's Misadventure"	Peter Sauder	John Yee & Andrea Robbins	14 September 1991
Algy learns a lesson about letting his curiosity get the better of him when he accidentally sends himself back to medieval England in the Wise Old Goat's time machine. It is up to Rupert to follow Algy and rescue him from the hands of Sir Guy, an evil knight.
4	4	"Rupert and the Purple Cakes"	Dale Schott	Bob Smith	15 September 1991
When Rupert and Podgy find what appear to be purple cakes in the forest, Podgy ignores Rupert's warnings and eats them. Too late, he discovers that they are the Professor's creations, devised to make things lighter than air. In danger of floating helplessly into space, as well as being pestered by a Cockney-accented seagull for his snacks, Podgy is saved by Rupert and learns never to eat anything unless you know exactly what it is and where it came from.
5	5	"Rupert and Bill in Gameland"	Peter Sauder	Brian Lee & Bob Smith	21 September 1991
Rupert and his friend, Bill Badger, learn that there are some things more important than winning when they find themselves on opposing sides in the ultimate game that could well destroy Gameland.
6	6	"Rupert and Little Yum"	Dale Schott	Bob Smith	28 September 1991
Rupert chooses to work around his friend, Officer Growler, and the laws he represents in order to free a rare baby abominable snowman from the influential Sir Jasper and Scrogg. However, it is only when he plays by Growler's rules that he is able to help his new friend and understand that, although it might seem slow, the law is fair and just and does punish the wrongdoers.
7	7	"Rupert and the Knight"	Dale Schott	Brian Lee	12 October 1991
Rupert loses his battle to break an age-old tradition when his attempts to kindle a friendship between a knight and a fire-breathing dragon ultimately end up with them engaged in a duel to the death. Only afterward does Rupert realize that the fight was staged and now, having done what was traditionally expected of them, the dragon and knight can co-exist as friends. Note: Rupert and the Knight borrows heavily from The Reluctant Dragon by Kenneth Grahame.
8	8	"Rupert and the Crocodiles"	Bruce Robb	John Flagg	13 October 1991
When his appetite ultimately gets himself and Rupert caught by hungry crocodiles, Podgy promises to change. However, it is also his appetite that allows them to escape, allowing Rupert to learn to accept others for what they are, faults included.
9	9	"Rupert and Raggety"	Bruce Robb	Sam Dixon & Andrea Robbins	20 October 1991
Rupert's unsuccessful attempts to teach a cantankerous wood troll the meaning of friendship only causes problems for the Imps of Spring, who are hard pressed to bring spring to Nutwood on time. It is only when Rupert allows the Wand of Spring to be destroyed in order to save the troll from his own mischief that the troll finally understands what being a friend is all about.
10	10	"Rupert's Undersea Adventure"	Peter Sauder	Sam Dixon	26 October 1991
When Rupert is falsely accused, caught and tried by King Neptune's undersea court for kidnapping Neptune's prized Whistle Fish, it is up to Rupert and a little mermaid, Marina, to race against time and save the fish, demonstrating that creatures of the land and sea must work together for the benefit of all.
11	11	"Rupert and the Twilight Fan"	Bruce Robb & Dale Schott	Brian Lee	9 November 1991
Tricked by an evil sorcerer, Tung Lai, into putting Tiger Lily under a sleeping spell, Rupert flies to the Bird Kingdom, hoping to find the cure. However, it is only when Rupert learns to read between the lines that he is able to find the way to awaken his friend.
12	12	"Rupert and Billy Blizzard"	Bruce Robb	Bob Smith	17 November 1991
Rupert's old snowman has fled to Nutwood seeking refuge from Billy Blizzard. Rupert learns that Blizzard has frozen King Frost and all the snowmen. Rupert and his snowman, as well as Reika, one of Santa's elves, must now head to the North Pole and end Billy's reign of terror.
13	13	"Rupert and the Pirates"	Peter Sauder	Dale Schott	23 November 1991
When Rupert finds a treasure map in the hull of a model ship, he convinces three retired pirates to get up out of their rocking chairs and go after it. In so doing, the ancient mariners recapture their bygone days and ultimately realize that life is not over just because they are old.

=== Season 2 (1992) ===
Note: This is the last season made with Cel animation.

No. overall	No. in season	Title	Written by	Storyboarded by	Original release date
14	1	"Rupert and the Temple Ruins"	Dale Schott	Bob Smith	13 September 1992
Rupert, Edward, and the Professor set out on a pleasant balloon ride, which soon turns into a harrowing adventure amongst ancient temple ruins on a remote tropical isle.
15	2	"Rupert and the Missing Snow"	David Finley	Gilles Cazaux	20 September 1992
After Santa asks him to find out why it has not snowed this winter, Rupert finds himself adrift on an ice floe in the middle of the Arctic Ocean, in pursuit of the stolen North Pole.
16	3	"Rupert and the Leprechauns"	Bruce Robb & Peter Sauder	Andrea Robbins & John Yee	27 September 1992
Rupert learns there are no easy solutions to age-old animosities when he becomes involved in a bitter feud between an elderly recluse and a band of Leprechauns.
17	4	"Rupert in Timeland"	David Finley	Gilles Cazaux	4 October 1992
When Rupert and Podgy find themselves unaffected by a sudden freeze in time, they visit Father Time in order to set things right but both end up on a journey into the future and age with each leap of time.
18	5	"Rupert and the Tiger's Eye"	Aaron Barzman & David Finley	Andrea Robbins & John Yee	14 October 1992
While on holiday in Sandy Cove, Rupert and a local girl named Frances become involved in a dangerous game of cloak and dagger as they match wits with an infamous jewel thief called the Chameleon.
19	6	"Rupert and the BIGsmall Machine"	Bruce Robb	Gilles Cazaux	21 October 1992
Rupert and Podgy must prevent a rival inventor from stealing all of the Professor's gadgets, after his latest invention accidentally shrinks them to the size of insects.
20	7	"Rupert and Uncle Grizzly"	Aaron Barzman & David Finley	Ray Jafelice & Andrea Robbins	28 October 1992
Rupert visits his Uncle Grizzly in the Wild West, and they find themselves at odds with scheming neighbors who are looking for gold.
21	8	"Rupert and the Fiddle"	David Finley	Andrea Robbins & John Yee	4 November 1992
Rupert and Podgy find themselves in Storyland, where their attempts at playing the fiddle for a not-so-merry Old King Cole lands them in the dungeon.
22	9	"Rupert and Nessie"	Mary Crawford & Alan Templeton	Sam Nixon, Paul Schibli & Dan Nosella	11 November 1992
Rupert travels to the shores of Loch Ness to rescue his legendary friend Nessie from the clutches of a fortune-hunting adventurer.
23	10	"Rupert and the Ghost"	David Finley	Andrea Robbins & Andrew Tan	18 November 1992
Rupert and his parents spend an uneasy night in a tumble-down castle, which comes complete with a ghost and a hidden pirate treasure. The workmen, Milton and Monty, are after the pirates' treasure.
24	11	"Rupert and the Lamp"	Mary Crawford & Alan Templeton	Sam Dixon & John Yee	25 November 1992
A flying carpet whisks Rupert and Bill far from home, where they free the people of Shandalar from the tyrannical rule of an evil genie.
25	12	"Rupert and the Firebird"	Aaron Barzman & David Finley	Bob Smith, Andrea Robbins & Dan Nosella	2 December 1992
A little bird that thinks Rupert is his mother turns out to have some surprising, and dangerous, abilities.
26	13	"Rupert and the Mulp Gulper"	Bruce Robb	Bob Smith & John Flagg	9 December 1992
Rupert and Bill's practical joke to cure Algy's bragging leads to a confrontation with the gigantic, and hungry, Mulp Gulper. The boys find they are the next items on the Gulper's menu.

=== Season 3 (1994) ===
Note: This is the first season with digital animation.

No. overall	No. in season	Title	Written by	Storyboarded by	Original release date
27	1	"Rupert and Ginger"	Dale Schott	Mizuho Sato Zanovello & Augusto Zanovello	3 March 1994
Rupert's encounter with a friendly Stegosaurus in Nutwood Forest leads him on an adventure to the Jurassic Era. Once there, he helps his friend, the Wise Old Goat, repair his malfunctioning time machine and avoid becoming a Tyrannosaurus' next meal.
28	2	"Rupert and Growler"	Dale Schott	Andrea Robbins	10 March 1994
Constable Growler's day off is canceled when Rupert is kidnapped by a river pirate and his grandsons, and both find themselves working against other police officers while trying to stop the thieves.
29	3	"Rupert and the Dragon Race"	Mary Crawford, Dale Schott & Alan Templeton	Mizuho Sato Zanovello & Augusto Zanovello	17 March 1994
A series of misadventures involving a flying couch necessitates a trek by Rupert and Pong Ping to the Valley of Dragons, on a rescue mission to save pals Edward, Bill and Toby from an uncertain fate.
30	4	"Rupert and the Hedgehog"	Bob Ardiel	Brian Lee & Chris Schouten	24 March 1994
Rupert and Bill's experiment with the art of topiary leads them to use a bit too much of the Professor's new growth formula to restore one of Mr. Bear's favorite shrubs to its proper size, which results in a "hedgehog" the size of a tour bus running loose through the Nutwood countryside.
31	5	"Rupert and Ottoline"	Dale Schott	John Flagg & Dave Pemberton	31 March 1994
Rupert and his new friend Ottoline Otter are swept up on a race to find the long lost king's gold before it falls into the hands of a "ghost" and his cohort, who are actually a pair of nasty treasure hunters.
32	6	"Rupert and the Cloud Pirates"	Mary Crawford & Alan Templeton	Jim Caswell & Andrea Robbins	7 April 1994
Rupert and Bill do battle with a cloud pirate who has shanghaied the Four Winds as part of his dastardly plan to control the world's weather.
33	7	"Rupert and the Nile"	Nicola Barton & Frank Diteljan	Dan Nosella & John Flagg	14 April 1994
While on holiday in Egypt, Rupert foils the plans of the evil explorer Sir Humphrey Pumphrey to loot the newly discovered tomb of the legendary Pharaoh Ramindas.
34	8	"Rupert and the Lost Memory"	Mary Crawford & Alan Templeton	John Flagg & Chris Schouten	21 April 1994
In a bid to get his hands on the Professor's latest invention, a misguided inventor steals the entire Nutwood file from the Memory Bank, the place where everyone's memories are stored.
35	9	"Rupert and the Sea Serpent"	Bob Ardiel	John Flagg & Chris Schouten	28 April 1994
While on vacation at the seaside, Rupert meets up with Podgy along with his spiteful cousin Rosalie. When the two pigs fail to get along, Rosalie sets off with a playful young sea serpent, and Rupert and Podgy are forced to go after her.
36	10	"Rupert and the Bell"	Andrew Nickolds	Gerry Capelle & Dan Nosella	5 May 1994
The local delinquents, Freddy and Ferdy Fox, find a bell that renders them invisible when they ring it. They put it to good use by playing nasty tricks, making Rupert appear to be the perpetrator.
37	11	"Rupert and the Carousel"	Nicola Barton & Frank Diteljan	Jim Caswell & Frank Lintzen	12 May 1994
Rupert and Ottoline find a merry-go-round that has been abandoned on the common, and restore it to its former grandeur. After the Sage of Um accidentally brings the wooden characters to life, the children find they must rescue the enchanted carousel from the evil Thogmort who wants it for his own financial gain.
38	12	"Rupert and the April Fool"	David Finley	Mizuho Sato Zanovello & Augusto Zanovello	19 May 1994
Rupert and Gregory Guinea Pig encounter the April Fool, an odd little man living in an even odder little house. He is a load of fun at first, but when the boys grow sick of his relentless jokes and tricks, the Fool is not inclined to let them leave.
39	13	"Rupert and the Clock Cuckoo"	Dale Schott	John Flagg & Dave Pemberton	26 May 1994
Rupert enlists the help of his pal Odmedod the scarecrow to rescue his new friend Ticktock the Clock Cuckoo from the clutches of a greedy bird collector.

=== Season 4 (1995) ===
No. overall	No. in season	Title	Written by	Storyboarded by	Original release date
40	1	"Rupert and the Giant"	J.D. Smith	Stefanie Gignac & Dan Nosella	3 September 1995
After stumbling upon a giant's castle, Rupert must rescue Bill from the clutches of a baby giant who decides the cuddly badger is his favorite new dolly.
41	2	"Rupert and the Wool Gatherers"	Bob Ardiel	Dave Thomas & Lyndon Ruddy	10 September 1995
Rupert helps his scarecrow pal Odmedod foil a pair of thieves who have been shearing Farmer Brown's sheep.
42	3	"Rupert and the Marsh Mystery"	Nicola Barton & Frank Diteljan	Dan Nosella & Dave Thomas	17 September 1995
Rupert travels with Ottoline to her Aunt Felicity's inn, and once there they both learn of Ottoline's aunt's financial trouble. To make matters worse, any attempt to keep the inn fixed up is being sabotaged in an attempt to force Felicity into selling off her property against her wishes.
43	4	"Rupert and A.R.C.H.I.E."	Patrick Granleese	Dan Nosella & Andrea Robbins	24 September 1995
The Professor invents a robot named A.R.C.H.I.E. that he believes will help people in many ways, and no one has to miss out on leisure activities ever again. But problems arise when A.R.C.H.I.E. starts getting a mind of his own.
44	5	"Rupert in Toyland"	Bob Ardiel	John Flagg & Dave Pemberton	1 October 1995
When Rupert's favorite toy Mr. Squeezer is accidentally thrown away, Rupert follows him to Toyland where he hopes to retrieve him, but winds up becoming a prisoner of Colonel Tinker who has resentment against all former owners of toys.
45	6	"Rupert in Dreamland"	Mary Crawford & Alan Templeton	Dan Nosella & Dave Pemberton	8 October 1995
Podgy keeps having the same nightmare every night, and he and Rupert both travel to Dreamland to see if there is a way to stop this nightmare from happening.
46	7	"Rupert's Roman Adventure"	Nicola Barton & Frank Diteljan	Dave Thomas & Stefanie Gignac	15 October 1995
Rupert and Bill travel back to the days of the Roman Empire, where they save the village of Nutwoodium from destruction at the hands of the local governor.
47	8	"Rupert in Mirrorland"	Patrick Granleese	Dave Thomas & Dave Pemberton	22 October 1995
Rupert finds himself in Mirrorland, where the Professor's ill-tempered reflection threatens to destroy everything in his bid to cross through to Nutwood.
48	9	"Rupert and the Crystal Kingdom"	Mary Crawford & Alan Templeton	Dan Nosella & John Flagg	29 October 1995
After a disagreement with his friends, Rupert goes his own way to a campsite. Along the way he detours into Tourmaline Valley, where he becomes trapped in a dispute between a prince and his people, and realizes that trust is very hard to come by.
49	10	"Rupert and the Space Pilots"	Bob Ardiel	Dan Nosella & Lyndon Ruddy	5 November 1995
While Freddie and Ferdie have the town fooled into thinking that evil aliens landed in Nutwood, Rupert has a real encounter with aliens who are not evil but are instead young and helpless.
50	11	"Rupert and the Mystery Isle"	Nicola Barton & Frank Diteljan	Andrea Robbins & Dan Nosella	12 November 1995
While on vacation in Rocky Bay, Rupert sees an island that should not be there. His old enemy, Sir Humphrey Pumphrey, is at the helm of an elaborately disguised submarine, intent on plundering King Neptune's palace.
51	12	"Rupert and Mum's Adventure"	Patrick Granleese	Lyndon Ruddy & Stefanie Gignac	19 November 1995
A shopping trip with Mrs. Bear leads to a trip to China and a harrowing adventure on a mysterious mountain.
52	13	"Rupert's Christmas Adventure"	Dale Schott	John Flagg & Dave Pemberton	26 November 1995
When all of Nutwood's Christmas trees are stolen, Rupert discovers that it is the work of the Pine Ogre, and finds himself with the task of retrieving the trees in addition to helping Santa give Gregory his present, which is to be as brave as Rupert.

=== Season 5 (1997) ===
No. overall	No. in season	Title	Written by	Storyboarded by	Original release date
53	1	"Rupert and the Jolly Roger"	Bob Ardiel	Annelies Davis & Dave Pemberton	27 March 1997
The men at the Rocky Bay Home for Retired Pirates need Rupert's help, when thieves make off with the treasure they have put on display for Rocky Bay's First Annual Pirate Days Festival.
54	2	"Rupert and the Great Mephisto"	Nicola Barton & Frank Diteljan	Frank Lintzen & John Flagg	3 April 1997
Soon after a traveling magician arrives in town and performs a magic show, numerous burglaries occur in Nutwood, and Rupert and Bill discover they are linked to hypnotism by the magician.
55	3	"Rupert and the Little Bear"	Ken Ross	Lyndon Ruddy & Dan Nosella	10 April 1997
The constellation Ursa Minor (Little Bear) escapes and Rupert and Podgy help return him to the sky where he belongs.
56	4	"Rupert and the Paper Folders"	Patrick Granleese	Frank Lintzen & Bob Smith	17 April 1997
While chasing after a kite, Rupert and Bill find that all the paper in Nutwood is being taken away to be recycled into building material for Origami City, a place made completely out of paper. Additionally, the boys discover the environmental consequences caused by the city's construction.
57	5	"Rupert and the Crystal Ball"	Ken Ross	Dave Thomas & Dan Nosella	24 April 1997
Rupert and Tiger Lily find a magic crystal that allows them to see into the future. While both hope to use its power to stop the worst events from happening, it does not occur to them what really causes the future events to happen.
58	6	"Rupert and the Sun Bandit"	Frank Diteljan	Alan Bunce & Lyndon Ruddy	1 May 1997
While Nutwood's citizens are losing their money to a salesman selling bottled sunshine, Rupert investigates the reason why the sun has not been out for many days.
59	7	"Rupert and the Song Snatcher"	Nicola Barton	Tom Nesbitt & Dan Nosella	8 May 1997
A king's toymaker desperately tries to impress his majesty with singing toys using voices from the forest, as Rupert and Bill both discover while chasing after Bill's baby brother, Toby.
60	8	"Rupert and Queen Bess"	Patrick Granleese	Mike Csunyoscka & Dave Thomas	15 May 1997
Rupert visits Ottoline at her mansion, and both find themselves traveling back in time to meet Shakespeare.
61	9	"Rupert and the Water Works"	Frank Diteljan	Lyndon Ruddy & Stefanie Gignac	22 May 1997
An ambitious Imp of Spring's crazy irrigation scheme threatens to put Nutwood under water.
62	10	"Rupert and the Deep Freeze"	Bob Ardiel	Dave Thomas & John Flagg	29 May 1997
Rupert assists Jack Frost in keeping his ice wand away from Billy Blizzard, only for it to go missing and end up in the hands of Freddie and Ferdie who team up with Billy Blizzard and together create an icy mess of Nutwood.
63	11	"Rupert and the Chalk Drawings"	Nicola Barton	Annelies Davis & Dave Thomas	5 June 1997
Rupert and Gregory draw themselves out of a tight spot in the land of chalk drawings.
64	12	"Rupert and the Dragon Festival"	Patrick Granleese	Rick Marshall	12 June 1997
While trying to return a baby dragon to the Chinese Emperor, Rupert and Pong Ping discover that all the imperial dragons are being led away by a mysterious flute player.
65	13	"Rupert and the Whizz Watch"	Bob Ardiel	Dave Thomas & Paul Schibli	19 June 1997
The Professor's latest invention allows him to speed up time to whoever uses it. But when it gets stuck on the Nutwood clock tower, time itself accelerates at ludicrous speeds.
