= Tante Cose da Veder =

Compilation album by Michal Horáček, Petr Hapka & Ondřej Brzobohatý
- Released: November 21, 2011
- Genre: Folk; jazz; pop; rock; chanson
- Length: 36:03
- Label: Sony

Michal Horáček chronology
Kudykam (2009)	Tante Cose da Veder (2011)	Český kalendář (2013)

Tante Cose da Veder (So Much to See) is a compilation album by Czech recording artists Michal Horáček, Petr Hapka and Ondřej Brzobohatý released on Sony Music in 2011.

== Track listing ==
All lyrics are written by Michal Horáček; all music is composed by Petr Hapka

No.	Title	Featured artist(s)	Length
1.	"Intro"	Michal Horáček	0:48
2.	"Tante Cose da Veder"	Michal Horáček	1:31
3.	"Tante Cose da Veder"	Petr Hapka	3:07
4.	"Tante Cose da Veder"	Karel Gott	3:33
5.	"Tante Cose da Veder"	Jaromír Nohavica	3:33
6.	"Tante Cose da Veder"	Katarína Knechtová	4:03
7.	"Tante Cose da Veder"	Jiří Suchý	3:56
8.	"Tante Cose da Veder"	Dan Bárta	3:52
9.	"Tante Cose da Veder"	Szidi Tobias	6:34
10.	"Tante Cose da Veder"	Aneta Langerová	5:06
Total length:			36:03

Notes

- All songs performed in Czech.

== Credits and personnel ==
- Michal Horáček - lyrics, lead vocal
- Petr Hapka - music, lead vocal
- Ondřej Brzobohatý - arrangement
- Karel Gott - lead vocal
- Jaromír Nohavica - lead vocal
- Katarína Knechtová - lead vocal
- Jiří Suchý - lead vocal
- Dan Bárta - lead vocal
- Szidi Tobias - lead vocal
- Aneta Langerová - lead vocal

== Charts ==
=== Album ===
Chart (2012)	Peak position
Czech Albums Chart	24

=== Airplay singles ===
Year	Song	Charts	
Year	Song	CZ	
Year	Song	50	100
2009	"Tante Cose da Veder" by Karel Gott	8	48
