= Strážce plamene =

Compilation album by Petr Hapka & Michal Horáček
- Released: 2006
- Recorded: January 2003 – May 2006
- Genre: Folk, jazz, pop, rock, chanson
- Length: 43:03
- Label: Universal Music (#170 957-5)
- Producer: Petr Hapka; Michal Horáček; Michal Pekárek

Michal Horáček chronology
Tak to chodí (2003)	Strážce plamene (2006)	Ohrožený druh (2008)

Petr Hapka chronology
V obrazech III (2004)	Strážce plamene (2006)	Ohrožený druh (2008)

Strážce plamene (The Flamekeeper) is a compilation album by Czech recording artists Petr Hapka and Michal Horáček, released on Universal Music in 2006.

== Track listing ==
All lyrics are written by Michal Horáček; all music is composed by Petr Hapka

No.	Title	Featured artist(s)	Length
1.	"První noc v novém bytě"	Jaromír Nohavica & Jana Kirschner	4:16
2.	"Otevřete okno, aby duše mohla ven"	Daniel Landa & Bára Basiková	3:47
3.	"Kdo by se díval nazpátek^{[A]}"	Hana Hegerová	3:10
4.	"Strážce plamene"	František Segrado	4:09
5.	"Vidoucí, ale neviděná"	Jana Kirschner	4:00
6.	"Neodolatelná"	Jaromír Nohavica	3:37
7.	"Na hotelu v Olomouci"	Szidi Tobias	3:59
8.	"Díkůvzdání"	Daniel Landa	5:14
9.	"Sněžná sova"	Jana Kirschner	4:23
10.	"Nemůžeš usnout III^{[A]}"	Petr Hapka	2:55
11.	"Hlava kance"	František Segrado	3:33
Total length:			43:03

Notes

- All songs performed in Czech.
- A Denotes a track licensed by Česká televize.

== Credits and personnel ==
- Michal Horáček - lyrics, producer
- Petr Hapka - music, producer, lead vocal
- Michal Pekárek - producer, remix, engineer, mastering
- Jaromír Nohavica - lead vocal
- Jana Kirschner - lead vocal
- Daniel Landa - lead vocal
- Bára Basiková - lead vocal
- Hana Hegerová - lead vocal
- František Segrado - lead vocal
- Szidi Tobias - lead vocal
- Mona Martinů - photography
- Oldřich Jelen - illustration
- Lubomír Šedivý - typography

== Charts ==
=== Albums ===
Chart (2006)	Peak position
Czech Albums Chart	1

=== Airplay singles ===
Year	Song	Charts			
Year	Song	CZ		SK	
Year	Song	50	100	50	100
2006	"První noc v novém bytě" by Jaromír Nohavica & Jana Kirschner	3	5	24	87
2007	"Strážce plamene" by František Segrado	35	86	—	—
2007	"Kdo by se díval nazpátek" by Hana Hegerová	45	—	—	—
"—" denotes a song that did not chart or was not released in that region.

== Certifications ==
Country	Certification	Quota
Czech Republic	4× Platinum	62,000

== Awards ==
Year	Nominated work	Award	Category	Result
2006	Strážce plamene	Anděl Awards	Album of the Year - Pop/Dance^{[B]}	Nominated
2006	Strážce plamene	Anděl Awards	Audio Recording of the Year^{[C]}	Nominated
2006	Strážce plamene	Anděl Awards	Cover of the Year^{[D]}	Nominated

Notes

- B Won the album Rubikon by Kryštof band.
- C Won the album Watching Black by Ecstasy of Saint Theresa.
- D Won the cover of Anna K's album Večernice.

== See also ==
- Strážce plamene v obrazech (DVD release)
