= Rupert (TV series) =

Animated children's television series

- Genre: Adventure; Fantasy; Educational; Comedy drama Children's television series
- Based on: Rupert Bear by Mary Tourtel
- Directed by: Dale Schott (seasons 1–2); Gary Hurst (seasons 3–5)
- Voices of: See article
- Opening theme: "The Happy Farmer Returning from Work" by Robert Schumann
- Ending theme: "The Happy Farmer Returning from Work" by Robert Schumann
- Composer: Milan Kymlicka
- Countries of origin: Canada; France (seasons 1–3)
- Original language: English
- No. of seasons: 5
- No. of episodes: 65 (list of episodes)

Production
- Executive producers: Pierre Bertrand-Jaume; Philippe Gildas; Michael Hirsh; Patrick Loubert; Robert Réa; Clive A. Smith
- Producers: Patricia R. Burns; Merle-Anne Ridley
- Running time: 30 minutes
- Production companies: Nelvana; Ellipse Programme (seasons 1–3); TVS Television (season 1); Scottish Television PLC (seasons 2–5)

Original release
- Network: YTV (Canada); ITV (UK); France 3 (France, seasons 1–3)
- Release: 7 September 1991 – 19 June 1997

Rupert is an animated children's television series based on the Mary Tourtel character Rupert Bear, which aired from 7 September 1991 to 19 June 1997 with 65 half-hour episodes produced. The series is produced by Nelvana, in co-production with Ellipse Programme for the first three seasons, in association with YTV Canada, Inc. (seasons 1–3 and 5), and ITV franchisees TVS Television (season 1) and Scottish Television (seasons 2–5).

== Synopsis ==
Rupert is a very intelligent and witty bear, and has many friends from every corner of the world. Although he lives in a small village called Nutwood, he enjoys traveling around the world, discovering new cultures, living great adventures, unraveling mysteries and unmasking villains. The visual style of the cartoon has many European and Nordic elements, with many castles, citadels and particular styles of dress, as well as myths like elves and the Loch Ness Monster. The landscapes of the Rupert Bear books, which inspired the series, were based on the regions of Snowdonia and Vale of Clwyd in the northern part of Wales.

== Episodes ==
Season	Episodes	Originally released	
Season	Episodes	First released	Last released
1	13	7 September 1991	23 November 1991
2	13	13 September 1992	9 December 1992
3	13	3 March 1994	26 May 1994
4	13	3 September 1995	26 November 1995
5	13	27 March 1997	19 June 1997

== Characters ==
=== Rupert's family ===
- Rupert Bear is a considerate, smart, resourceful, brave, trusty, good-spirited bear who is extremely popular with all the residents in Nutwood. On occasion, he breaks the fourth wall in addressing his observations and making comments to the viewer.
- Mr. Bear is Rupert's father. He is much more clumsy and forgetful compared to Rupert. He often smokes a pipe. It is revealed in the episode "Firebird" that both Mr. Bear and Podgy's father are part of the Nutwood Fire Brigade.
- Mrs. Bear is Rupert's mother. Like her son, she is wise and often offers advice to Rupert who later uses it during his adventures.

=== Recurring characters ===
- Bill Badger is Rupert's best friend, who, unlike Rupert, often presents a lot of flaws, such as cowardice, impatience, clumsiness, a quick temper, and a horrible singing voice. He has a baby brother named Toby, who is fond of Bill's singing voice.
- Podgy Pig is a jolly, yet greedy and not very bright pig with a large appetite. He is very friendly to others and appears not to see that his friends sometimes find him annoying. His appetite at times can lead him and his friends into trouble, but Rupert can look past this to go out of his way to help Podgy.
- Pong Ping is a Pekingese from China who owns an elevator that can travel underground all the way to China. He has a wealth of knowledge of his culture including dragons and various magical objects. He's also good at math.
- Tiger Lily is Rupert's female and Chinese friend. The only human student in school and the member of one of few human families in Nutwood. She and her family have a lot of knowledge on magical and mystical objects.
- Algy Pug is Rupert's friend, a pug who often overestimates his abilities and takes a lot of pride in himself. Despite his flaws, he is shown to be a good and helpful friend for Rupert and others.
- Edward Trunk is another friend of Rupert. An elephant, very kind, sensitive and strong. He is often seen helping his father who works in plumbing.
- Gregory Guinea Pig is a very kind guinea pig and another friend of Rupert. Sometimes he can be nervous and scared, but he meets the challenges head on when his friends need help.
- Ottoline Otter is Rupert's friend who is an otter of a Scottish descent who loves Shakespeare and lives in an old castle that belonged to her ancestors. The castle has many secret entrances hidden all over. Ottoline has vast knowledge of each entrances' location and will prefer to use them instead of the stairs.
- Freddy and Ferdy Fox are two mischievous twin foxes who spread mischief around the village of Nutwood.
- Constable Growler is a dog and local policeman who rides a bicycle. He constantly says he needs to do "everything by the book, you know" and is always turned to by Rupert and his friends whenever they need help catching a criminal.
- The Professor is a very friendly and eccentric human scientist who resides in an old castle tower in Nutwood, who invents many incredible devices during the series. Rupert often helps out with his experiments. Once the Professor starts an experiment, he never rests. He has the catchphrase, "Think of the possibilities, my boy(s)!" whenever he is explaining his experiments and all the benefits that can come from it to Rupert and his friends.
- The Sage of Um is a jolly wizard who comes from the island of Um and flies in an upside-down umbrella. He is a friend of Tiger Lily's father, the Conjurer.
- Odmedod is a talking friendly scarecrow that lives in Farmer Turbit's farm and a friend of Rupert.
- Reika is a Swiss human girl who lives in Lapland looking after the reindeer of Santa Claus and a friend of Rupert and Pong Ping.

=== Villains ===
- Billy Blizzard is an ambitious villain, who with the help of a magic whistle, plans to freeze the snow villagers of the North Pole as well as its ruler, King Frost and become the leader of the place.
- Sir Humphrey Pumphrey is a greedy, ruthless explorer who tries to find or plunder riches for his own selfish desires.

== Voice cast ==
- Ben Sandford as Rupert Bear (1991)
- Julie Lemieux as Rupert Bear (1992–1997)
- Guy Bannerman as Mr. Bear
- Lally Cadeau as Mrs. Bear (1991–1992)
- Valerie Boyle as Mrs. Bear (1992–1997)
- Torquil Campbell as Bill Badger
- Hadley Kay as Podgy Pig
- Keith White as Algy Pug
- Oscar Hsu as Pong Ping
- Stephanie Morgenstern as Tiger Lily
- Wayne Robson as Sage of Um
- Colin Fox as Professor
- Chris Wiggins as Chinese Emperor; Chinese Conjuror; Captain Bill; additional voices
- Ho Chow as Tung Lai
- Jeremy Ratchford as Botkin
- Peter Wildman as Mr. Ribbons; Captain Sir
- Dan Hennessey as Tom
- Stephen Ouimette as additional voices
- Kristin LeMunyon as Clarice
- Allen Stewart-Coates as Cedric Pig; Constable Growler; additional voices
- Keith Knight as Timid Snowman; Mr. Chimp; The Sandman; additional voices
- Rick Jones as Yum
- Marla Lukofsky as Phoebe
- Colin O'Meara as Billy Blizzard; additional voices

== Production ==
The series was produced by Nelvana, Ellipse Programmé, and TVS for its first season, with Scottish Television taking over for the second season onwards when TVS lost its franchise.

== Broadcast ==
It was broadcast in syndication on YTV in Canada. In the United States, the series first aired on Nickelodeon as part of the Nick Jr. block in 1995 before moving to CBS Saturday mornings in 1999. Repeats of the series came to Disney Channel on the Playhouse Disney block, Toon Disney, and on Qubo from January 8, 2007, to July 25, 2020.

The series was broadcast in the United Kingdom on CITV, Tiny Pop, and KidsCo. In Portugal, the series was broadcast during the 1990s on the RTP channel. In Australia, the series was broadcast on ABC, and later on Nickelodeon Australia, as well as on TV2 in New Zealand. It aired on RTÉ in Ireland as part of their children's block The Den.

In South America, the series was broadcast in Brazil by TV Cultura from February 2, 1998 to 2006, with audience peaks between 2002 and 2004, according to the Folha de São Paulo portal. In South Africa, the series was broadcast on both Bop TV and M-Net as part of their wrapper programme for children, K-T.V. In Zimbabwe, the series aired on both ZBC and ZTV. In Kenya, it aired on KBC. The series was also played in Namibia on NBC.

Rupert also aired in the United Arab Emirates; it was broadcast on the English free-for-air channel Dubai 33. The series was also broadcast on RTB in Brunei. In Guam, the series was screened on KUAM-LP. In Saudi Arabia, the series was played on the country's English-speaking channel Saudi 2, and in the Arab world, it aired on Spacetoon from 2000 to 2014 in Arabic.

== Theme and closing song ==
Both the theme and closing song were composed by Milan Kymlicka. They are based on Robert Schumann's The Happy Farmer, Returning from Work in F major, Op. 68, No. 10.

When the series aired on Nickelodeon in the US, a different theme song was used, with lyrics and vocals in the intro, and an instrumental of that same tune in the outro. This composition, Rupert's Number One, was co-penned by Sheree Jeacocke and Gerry Mosby.

== Feature film version ==
According to BBC News, Nelvana made plans in 2000 to produce a Hollywood feature film based on the Rupert property, but the project was not implemented. The film would have been released possibly between 2001 and 2002.
