= V cudzom meste =

Studio album by Jana Kirschner
- Released: 1999
- Genre: Pop rock
- Length: 47:01
- Label: Universal

V cudzom meste (English: In a strange city) is the second album by the Slovak singer Jana Kirschner. It was released in 1999 under the Universal label. In 2007, the album was the 19th best album in the history of Slovak pop music and the best album recorded by a female singer by The 100 Greatest Slovak Albums of All Time. It was reported in 2001, that it exceeded sold 30,000 copies. It was released as a double LP record with four live recording during its 20th anniversary.

== Track listing ==
All tracks are written by Jana Kirschner unless otherwise specified

No.	Title	Length
1.	"Všetko je na nič" (Written by Ivan Tásler and Ondřej Hejma)	3:46
2.	"Líška" (Written by Daniel Hevier and Ivan Tásler)	3:14
3.	"Posledná" (Co-written with Jozef Šebo, Martin Gašpar, Martin Wittgruber and Zuna Mayerská)	3:27
4.	"Modrá" (Co-written with Ján Hangoni)	4:11
5.	"V cudzom meste" (Written by Ivan Tásler)	3:19
6.	"Don't worry" (Co-written with Ján Hangoni)	2:49
7.	"Little sister" (Co-written with Ján Hangoni and Maroš Hečko)	3:42
8.	"You're my man" (Co-written with Maroš Hečko and Martin Wittgruber)	3:48
9.	"I don't want you"	3:56
10.	"Right here"	4:15
11.	"Home"	3:29
12.	"Sweet child" (Co-written with Oskar Rózsa)	3:08
13.	"Žienka domáca" (Co-written with Ján Kapusta)	3:57
Total length:		47:01

=== Bonus tracks in the 2019 edition ===
No.	Title	Length
1.	"Don't Worry (Live)"	3:08
2.	"Líška (Live)"	3:17
3.	"Modrá (Live)"	4:32
4.	"Oh Me, Oh My"	3:03
