= Milan Kymlicka =

Canadian composer

- Born: Milan Kymlička; 15 May 1936; Louny, Czechoslovakia
- Died: 9 October 2008 (aged 72); Toronto, Ontario, Canada
- Education: Academy of Performing Arts in Prague; Prague Conservatory
- Occupations: Arranger; composer; conductor

Milan Kymlicka (Czech: Milan Kymlička; 15 May 1936 – 9 October 2008) was a Czech-Canadian arranger, composer and conductor. He was known for his composition of film and television scores, including those for the animated television series Rupert, Babar, Anatole, The Busy World of Richard Scarry and The Adventures of Paddington Bear and the live-action television series Lassie and Little Men. He received a Genie Award in 1996 for his work on Margaret's Museum.

== Early life ==
Kymlicka was born in Louny, Czechoslovakia. He earned degrees from the Academy of Performing Arts in Prague and the Prague Conservatory. At the latter institution he was a pupil of Emil Hlobil.

== Career ==
Kymlicka began his work as a composer in his native country and by 1967, he had produced 20 film scores, a ballet, a cello concerto, several works for solo piano, a number of string quartets, and created the theme for an animated television series.

After the Prague Spring in 1968, Kymlicka emigrated to Canada, where he settled in Toronto, Ontario. By the early 1970s, he was working as a studio arranger/conductor at the Canadian Broadcasting Corporation. In 1974, Kymlicka became a naturalized Canadian citizen. That year, he arranged music for and conducted the Hamilton Philharmonic, accompanying pop musician Ian Thomas; his arrangements were included on some of Thomas' recordings in the 1970s.

Kymlicka continued working as a composer, arranger, and conductor for film, television, and radio. His composition "Four Valses" was recorded by pianist Antonín Kubálek in New York.

Kymlicka died in Toronto in 2008. Among his last released works was Závoj tkaný touhami (originally by Tanita Tikaram), arranged for the 2008 album Ohrožený druh.
