= Ohrožený druh =

Compilation album by Michal Horáček
- Released: 27 October 2008
- Genre: Folk, jazz, pop, rock, chanson
- Length: 40:40
- Label: Sony BMG (#86973 89422)
- Producer: Michal Horáček

Michal Horáček chronology
| Strážce plamene (2006) | Ohrožený druh (2008) | Kudykam (2009) |

Ohrožený druh (Threatened Species) is a compilation album by Czech recording artist Michal Horáček, released on Sony BMG in 2008.

== Track listing ==
| No. | Title | Lyrics | Music | Featured artist(s) | Length |
|---|---|---|---|---|---|
| 1. | "Tramtárie" | Michal Horáček | Hana Robinson | Natálie Kocábová | 3:35 |
| 2. | "Zpráva, která všechno změní" | Michal Horáček | Hana Robinson | Hana Robinson | 3:43 |
| 3. | "Jak se ten chlap na mě dívá^{[A]}" | Paolo Conte & Michal Horáček | Paolo Conte | Lenka Nová, Naďa Válová & Matěj Ruppert | 5:43 |
| 4. | "Esik az eső, csendesen" | Michal Horáček | Milan Vyskočáni | Szidi Tobias | 3:37 |
| 5. | "Bellissima" | Michal Horáček | Hana Robinson | Hana Robinson & Richard Krajčo | 3:27 |
| 6. | "Všechno je, jak má být" | Michal Horáček | Ivan Hlas | Naďa Válová | 3:30 |
| 7. | "Veselo k uzoufání" | Michal Horáček | František Černý & Karel Holas | Tereza Nekudová & František Černý | 5:02 |
| 8. | "V úzkých" | Michal Horáček | Petr Hapka | Naďa Válová | 2:48 |
| 9. | "Závoj tkaný touhami^{[B]}" | Tanita Tikaram & Michal Horáček | Tanita Tikaram | Szidi Tobias | 4:45 |
| 10. | "Ohrožený druh" | Michal Horáček | Jarda Svoboda | Věra Nerušilová | 4:30 |
| Total length: | | | | | 40:40 |

Bonus
| No. | Title | Length |
|---|---|---|
| 11. | "V dílně šanzonu" (document by Jan Mudra) | 13:30 |
| Total length: | | 54:10 |

Notes

- All songs performed in Czech with exception of "Esik az eső, csendesen", sung partly in Hungarian.
- A Denotes a cover version of the Paolo Conte's song, originally composed for Tu mi turbi (1983), a movie by Roberto Benigni.
- B Denotes a cover version of the Tanita Tikaram's song "Twist in My Sobriety", originally released on her studio album Ancient Heart (1988).

== Credits and personnel ==
- Michal Horáček - lyrics, producer
- Hana Robinson - music, lead vocal
- Paolo Conte - music, lyrics
- Milan Vyskočáni - music
- Ivan Hlas - music
- František Černý - music, lead vocal
- Karel Holas - music
- Petr Hapka - music
- Tanita Tikaram - music, lyrics
- Jarda Svoboda - lyrics
- Natálie Kocábová - lead vocal
- Lenka Nová - lead vocal
- Naďa Válová - lead vocal
- Szidi Tobias - lead vocal
- Richard Krajčo - lead vocal
- Tereza Nekudová -lead vocal
- Věra Nerušilová - lead vocal
- Matěj Ruppert - back vocal
- Milan Kymlicka - arranger

== Charts and certifications ==
=== Weekly charts ===
| Chart (2008) | Peak position |
|---|---|
| Czech Albums Chart | 1 |

=== Sales certifications ===
| Country | Certification | Quota |
|---|---|---|
| Czech Republic | 2× Platinum | 35,000^{[A]} |

Notes

- A Ohrožený druh became the best-selling album of a music band in the Czech Republic with the sale of 22,766 copies. As of 2011, its total sale reached 35,000 units.

== Awards ==
| Year | Nominated work | Award | Category | Result |
|---|---|---|---|---|
| 2008 | Ohrožený druh | Anděl Awards | Album of the Year^{[B]} | Won |

Notes

- B The rest of nominees included Kryštof v opeře album by Kryštof group, Yvonne Sanchez's album My Garden and the self-titled album by Toxique band.
