= Alexandra Alvarová =

Czech disinformation expert (born 1967)

- Born: Alexandra Makovičková; 1967 (age 58–59); Beroun, Czechoslovakia
- Education: Gymnasium in Beroun (1985) Theatre Faculty of the Academy of Performing Arts in Prague (enrolled)
- Occupations: publicist, journalist, translator, public relations executive, author
- Organization(s): Radio Free America, Kanárci v síti, Přednášky 21
- Known for: Expertise in propaganda, disinformation, hybrid warfare; Author of books on disinformation and psychological operations
- Notable work: Průmysl lži (2017); Krmit démony (2022)
- Political party: KDU-ČSL (since 1990)

Alexandra Alvarová (also known as Alex Alvarová; born 1 June 1967) is a Czech publicist and journalist. She is an expert on propaganda, disinformation, and is PR specialist. Since 1996 she has worked in political marketing and public communication. She is known for popularizing topics such as hybrid warfare, psychological operations, and media literacy.

== Life and career ==
Alexandra Alvarová was born in 1967 in Beroun, Czechoslovakia (now the Czech Republic). In 1985, she graduated from the gymnasium (secondary school) in Beroun and enrolled at the Theatre Faculty of the Academy of Performing Arts in Prague (AMU). In 1988 she emigrated to West Germany, where she worked as a sales representative. From 1992 to 1993 she worked as head of the foreign desk at the daily Lidová demokracie. Between 1993 and 1995, she served as an adviser to the Deputy Speaker of the Chamber of Deputies of the Parliament of the Czech Republic in the field of mass media legislation and theory. From 1995 to 1999 she was co-owner of the PR agency Cardinal. Between 1996 and 2012, she alternated between Vienna and Prague, working in various positions in consulting, marketing, and public communication. In Vienna, between 2006 and 2012, she participated in testing central systems of banks and insurance companies (Raiffeisen, Generali).

Since the 1990s she has collaborated with various media (1994–2006) writing scripts for Czech Television, Czech Radio, etc.). She wrote articles for Ekonom and Hospodářské noviny (2003–2006). She was also involved in teaching nonverbal communication (2000–2006).

Between 2012 and 2014 she worked as head of political marketing and spokesperson for the KDU-ČSL party. In 2013 she also ran as a candidate for the Chamber of Deputies in the Central Bohemian Region. From 2014 she worked in KDU-ČSL as a PR adviser to Pavel Svoboda, then chairman of the Legal Affairs Committee of the European Parliament.

In 2016 she resigned from her position and moved with her family to Vancouver, Canada, where she continued to work in communication and marketing. She later moved to Boston.

She speaks four languages: English, German, French, and Russian, with Czech as her mother tongue.

== Activities ==
Alvarová has been deeply engaged in public lecturing and educational efforts since the late 2010s, with a strong emphasis on delivering talks to diverse audiences and aim to enhance societal resilience against manipulative narratives. Her talks occur at universities, libraries, theaters, and international forums.

Since 2020, together with Josef Holý, she has co-created the podcast Kanárci v síti (lit. 'Canaries in the Net') about digital propaganda, hybrid warfare, psychological operations, artificial intelligence, and related current political events.

Přednášky pro 21.století (English: "Lectures of the 21st Century") is an educational lecture series launched in 2025, focused on guiding modern audiences through complex topics in information warfare, politics, and societal manipulation. She hosts often well-known subject matter experts to provide in-depth insights not commonly available in mainstream discourse. Examples of topics include Padesát let neviditelného amerického pádu (lit. 'Fifty years of the invisible American decline'), Psychoanalýza Donalda Trumpa (lit. 'Psychoanalysis of Donald Trump'), Kdo je to Steve Bannon? (lit. 'Who is Steve Bannon?'), and USA vs Trump a kauza Epstein (lit. 'USA vs Trump and the Epstein case').

In January 2026, Alexandra Alvarová, together with American writer and producer Natálie Kocáb, founded the bilingual media project Radio Free America. Inspired by the tradition of Radio Free Europe, the project aims to build a bridge between the European and American information spaces by providing contextual journalism, explaining American politics to European audiences and vice versa, and actively combating disinformation and hybrid propaganda. Launched through a crowdfunding campaign, it focuses primarily on strengthening transatlantic relations and democratic values amid growing polarization. Among the guests were Steven Hassan, Hedi Cuda, Jim Stewartson, Kristina Ciroková, and Merci Shore.

Alvarová has also engaged in international collaborations with experts in disinformation and propaganda, such as appearing as a guest on the Radicalized podcast hosted by Jim Stewartson, Heidi Cuda, High Fidelity, and Sean Conner, discussing topics like psychocults, algocracy, and radicalization.

She also publishes articles on various platforms such as Medium and Deník N.

== Attacks aimed at discrediting Alvarová ==
Alexandra Alvarová, as an expert on propaganda and disinformation, has for many years faced various attempts at discreditation. For example, In March 2022, Czech MEP Tomáš Zdechovský accused her of repeatedly "spreading disinformation" and remarked that "she should rather stay in Canada and write books." Some of the strongest criticism has come from the organization Společnost pro obranu svobody projevu (lit. 'Society for the Defense of Freedom of Speech'), which in February 2025 labeled her "conspiracy theorist.", similarly to Jan Zahradil who labeled her "a paranoid promoter of conspiracy theories." In December 2025, Společnost pro obranu svobody projevu further described her as a "proponent of hysteria around disinformation," adding that it was "unfortunate how many state officials have been taken in by her alleged conspiratorial interpretations."

However, Czech media have in turn linked SOSP and persons involved in the organization with the spread of disinformation and with pro-Russian narratives. Similar associations have been mentioned in connection with Zahradil. Zdechovský has also been criticized in the media for participating in what were described as propagandistic missions allegedly organized by questionable actors like Henri Malosse with connections to Russia.

== Writings ==
- Průmysl lži (lit. 'The Industry of Lies') (2017) – A nonfiction book describing how fake news works and the specific manipulative tactics used in hybrid warfare. It links the campaign during the 2013 Czech presidential election with the 2016 U.S. election, and discusses contemporary political affairs and their connections to hybrid warfare and psychological operations.
- Krmit démony (English: 'Feeding The Demons: The Conquerors of America') (2022) – An allegorical thriller about hybrid wars, inspired by the life of Steve Bannon and the Cambridge Analytica affair.
