= Jaromír Nohavica =

Czech musician & poet (born 1953)

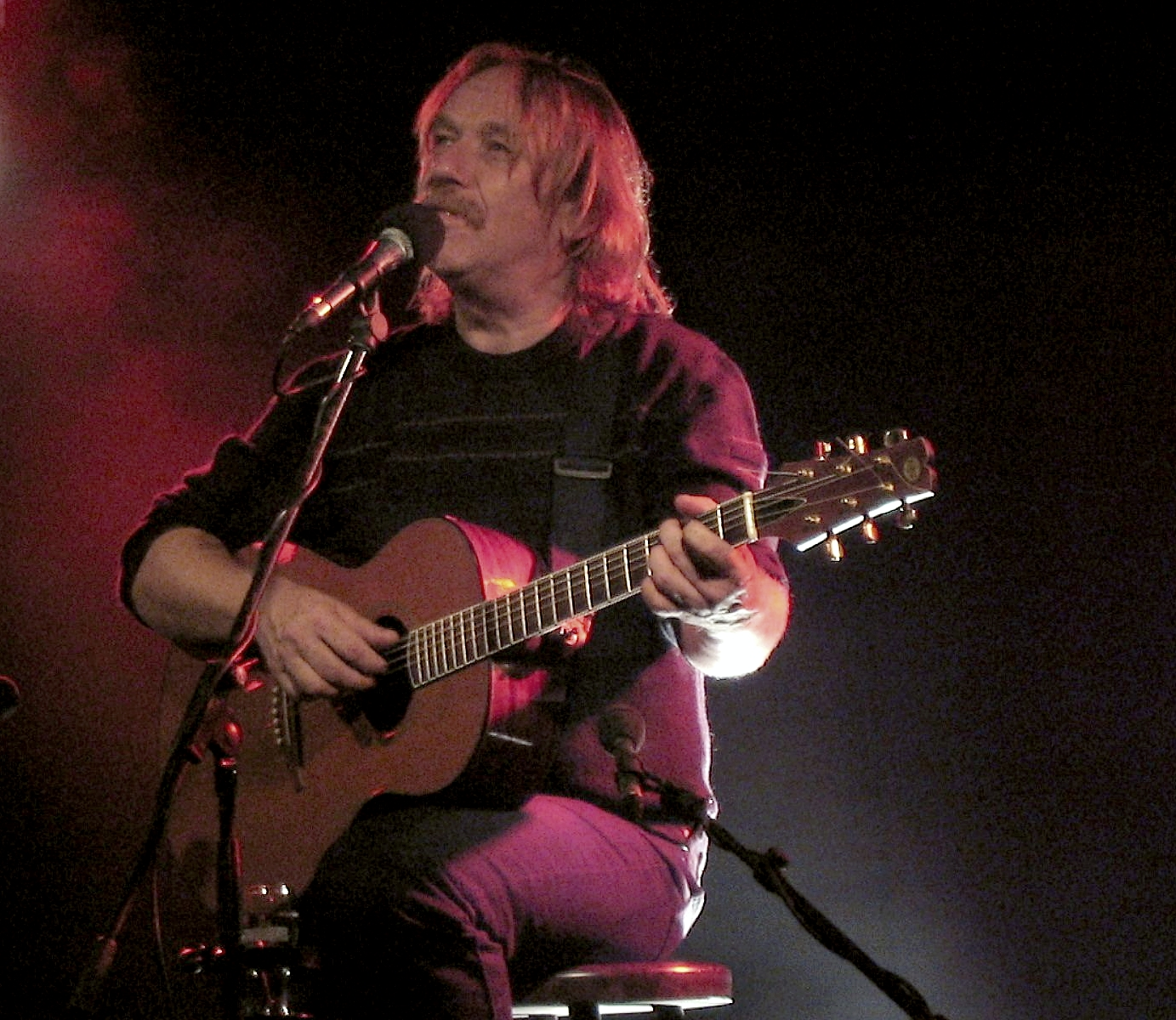
- Jaromír Nohavica

Background information
- Born: 7 June 1953 (age 73); Ostrava, Czechoslovakia
- Genre: folk
- Occupations: Singer-songwriter, lyricist, poet
- Instruments: guitar, accordion
- Labels: Panton, Monitor, Sony Music / Bonton,
- Website: www.nohavica.cz (Czech, English, Polish)

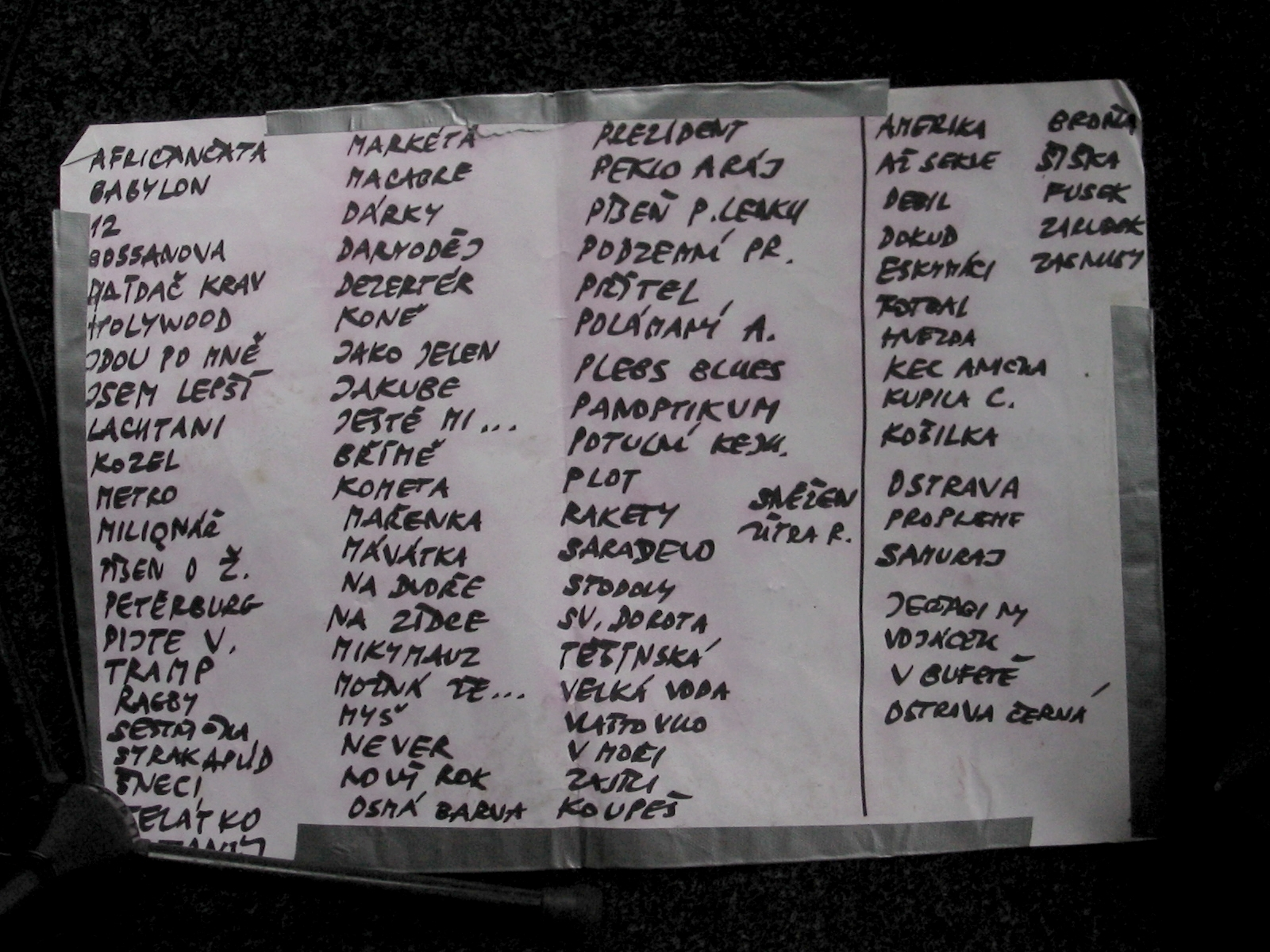
A list of songs to play stuck to the floor before Nohavica's concert

Jaromír Nohavica or Jarek Nohavica (born 7 June 1953, in Ostrava) is a Czech recording artist, songwriter, lyricist and poet.

== Early life ==
He was born in Ostrava and has played guitar since he was 13. He began studies at the Technical University of Ostrava but eventually left the school. He tried various jobs, including as a freelance lyricist. He gained fame with his first song for Marie Rottrová, Lásko, voníš deštěm (You Smell of Rain, My Love; actually a cover version of the song She's Gone by Black Sabbath). He lives in Ostrava with his wife and two children.

== Career ==
In 1982, he started performing in public, and his songs gained popularity. His first album, Darmoděj (The Wastrel), released in 1988, sold out immediately. A mythical aura arose around Nohavica which survived even the crisis period of his treatment for alcoholism. He released the somewhat pessimistic Mikymauzoleum (Mickey Mausoleum), an album containing mainly melancholic songs.

In 1994, he recorded a live album, Tři čuníci (Three Piglets), intended for children, with humorous songs.

In 1996, Nohavica released Divné století (Strange Century). He and his producer employed new instruments and voices for the new songs on the album, which became a huge success. Two years later the Jaromir Nohavica and Kapela (i.e. the Band) came out with Koncert (Concert), a record featuring Nohavica playing with a band, which recognizably changed his music. The album contains mainly older material, but his treatment gave it a new appeal. His studio album from 2000, Moje smutné srdce (My Sad Heart), contained mostly sad songs about love.

Nohavica also starred in Petr Zelenka's movie Rok Ďábla (Year of the Devil), which was awarded the main prize at the 37th Karlovy Vary International Film Festival in 2002 and several other international film festivals. He translated the Polish musical Painted on Glass for Divadlo Na Fidlovačce and poeticized Mozart's opera Così fan tutte for the National Moravian-Silesian Theatre.

He has enjoyed popularity in neighbouring Poland and Slovakia, as well as Czech Republic.

In 2007, Czech singer-songwriter Jaroslav Hutka accused Nohavica of having collaborated with the StB (the Communist-era Czechoslovak secret police). Documents released the previous year indicated that in the 1980s, Nohavica had met two exponents of the Czechoslovak exile culture Karel Kryl and Pavel Kohout in Austria, and had informed the police about their activities.

In 2018, Nohavica got Pushkin's medal personally from Vladimir Putin.

== Discography ==
=== Extended play records ===
- Cesty (Roads) (EP, Panton 1985)
- Písně pro V. V. (Songs for V. V.) (2 EPs, Panton 1988)

=== Albums ===
- Darmoděj ("Aimless", live album, 1988)
- Osmá barva duhy ("The Eighth Color of the Rainbow", live album, 1989)
- V tom roce pitomém ("In That Stupid Year", live album, 1990)
- Mikymauzoleum ("Mickeymausoleum", studio album, 1993)
- Tři čuníci ("The Three Piglets", live album, 1994)
- Darmoděj a další ("Aimless and others", studio album, 1995)
- Divné století ("A Strange Century", studio album, 1996)
- Koncert ("The Concert", live album, 1998)
- Moje smutné srdce ("My Sad Heart", studio album, 2000)
- Babylon (studio album, 2003)
- Pražská pálená ("Prague Brandy", live album, 2005)
- Doma ("At Home", live album, 2006)
- Ikarus ("Icarus", live album, 2008)
- Z podia - On the Road 2008 ("From the Stage - On the Road 2008", live album, 2008)
- V Lucerně ("In the Lantern^{a} ", live album, 2009)
- Virtuálky ("Virtuallies", studio album, 2009)
- Virtuálky 2 ("Virtuallies 2", studio album, 2010)
- Virtuálky 3 ("Virtuallies 3", studio album, 2011)
- Tak mě tu máš ("So Here You Have Me", studio album, 2012)
- Tenkrát ("Back Then", compilation album, 2013)
- Jarek Nohavica a přátelé ("Jarek Nohavica and Friends", live album, 2014)
- Poruba ("Glade", studio album, 2017)
- V Gongu ("In the Gong^{a} ", live album, 2018)
- Máma mi na krk dala klíč ("Mom Put a Key Around My Neck", studio album, 2020)

=== Other appearances ===
- 2006: Strážce plamene with Petr Hapka & Michal Horáček
- 2007: Strážce plamene v obrazech with Hapka & Horáček
- 2011: Tante Cose da Veder with Hapka, Horáček & Ondřej Brzobohatý

== Notes and references ==
^a Lucerna and Gong ("The Lantern" and "The Gong") are names of the establishments where the corresponding albums were performed and recorded.
