= Roman Nohavica =

Czech footballer

Personal information
- Date of birth: 1 March 1974 (age 52)
- Height: 1.91 m (6 ft 3 in)
- Position: Defender

Senior career*
Years	Team	Apps	(Gls)
1994–1997	Baník Ostrava		
1997–1998	Atlantic Lázně Bohdaneč		
1998–2000	Opava		
2000–2002	Pardubice		
2002–2003	Viktoria Plzeň		
2003–2004	1. HFK Olomouc		
- * Club domestic league appearances and goals

Roman Nohavica (born 1 March 1974) is a retired Czech football defender.
