= Danica Jurčová =

Slovak-Czech actress (born 1976)

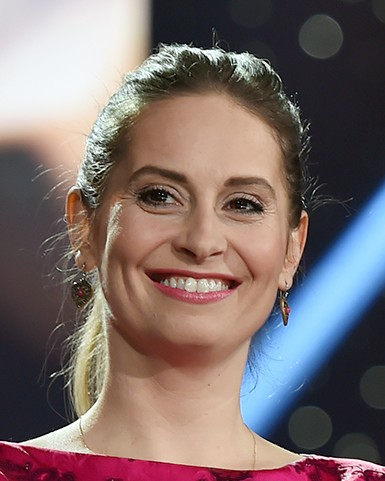
- Jurčová in 2016
- Born: 5 August 1976 (age 50); Bratislava, Czechoslovakia (now Slovakia)
- Education: Academy of Performing Arts in Bratislava
- Occupation: Actress
- Years active: 1994–present

Danica Jurčová (born 5 August 1976, Bratislava) is a Slovak-Czech actress.

In 1998 she graduated from the Academy of Performing Arts in Bratislava. She performed at the Slovak National Theater in works such as The Cherry Orchard, As You Like It, Merry Wives of Windsor and Lorenzaccio. At the Divadlo Astorka Korzo '90 theatre she played The Philistine at the New Scene. She also starred in television productions including soap operas. Currently she operates in the Czech Republic.

== Selected filmography ==
- Empties (2007)
- 360 (2011)
