= Noveritis =

Liturgical proclamation of Easter and moveable feasts sung on Epiphany

The Noveritis, also variously known as the Announcement of Easter and the Moveable Feasts (in the post-1970 Roman Missal) or the Epiphany proclamation, is a liturgical chant sung on the Feast of Epiphany that contains a summary of liturgical dates of moveable feasts in the year ahead. Noveritis comes from the incipit of the chant. It is sung to the same tune as the Exsultet.

The practice is found principally in the Roman Catholic Church, but is also observed in some parishes of other Western rite denominations, including the Anglican Communion and Lutheran churches.

== Ancient practice ==
According to ancient custom, the priest announced the date of Easter on the feast of Epiphany. This tradition dated from a time when calendars were not readily available, and the church needed to publicise the date of Easter, since many celebrations of the liturgical year depend on it.

In many parts of the world the Noveritis fell into disuse during the latter twentieth century, but some sources suggest a notable revival of its use in the early years of the twenty-first century.

== Usage ==
The Roman Missal provides a formula with appropriate chant (in the same tone as the Exsultet) for proclaiming on Epiphany, wherever it is customary to do so, the dates in the calendar for the celebration of Ash Wednesday, Easter Sunday, Ascension Day, Pentecost, Corpus Christi, and the Advent Sunday, that will mark the following liturgical year. In the Mass of Paul VI, the proclamation may be sung or proclaimed at the ambo by a priest, deacon, cantor, or reader, either after the reading of the Gospel or after the postcommunion prayer.

A number of liturgical resource websites provide the full text annually, with dates specific to the year. Similar resources are provided directly to the clergy by the bishops in some regions.

== Text ==
Words in italics are for the year 2026.

English text
Know, dear brethren (brothers and sisters),
that, as we have rejoiced at the Nativity of our Lord Jesus Christ,
so by leave of God's mercy
we announce to you also the joy of his Resurrection,
who is our Savior.

On the eighteenth day of February will fall Ash Wednesday,
and the beginning of the fast of the most sacred Lenten season.

On the fifth day of April you will celebrate with joy Easter Day,
the Paschal feast of our Lord Jesus Christ.

On the fourteenth (or seventeenth) day of May will be the Ascension of our Lord Jesus Christ.

On the twenty-fourth day of May, the feast of Pentecost.

On the fourth (or seventh) day of June, the feast of the Most Holy Body and Blood of Christ.

On the twenty-ninth day of November, the First Sunday of the Advent of our Lord Jesus Christ,
to whom is honor and glory for ever and ever.
Amen.
