= Michael Kocáb =

Czech musician and political activist (born 1954)

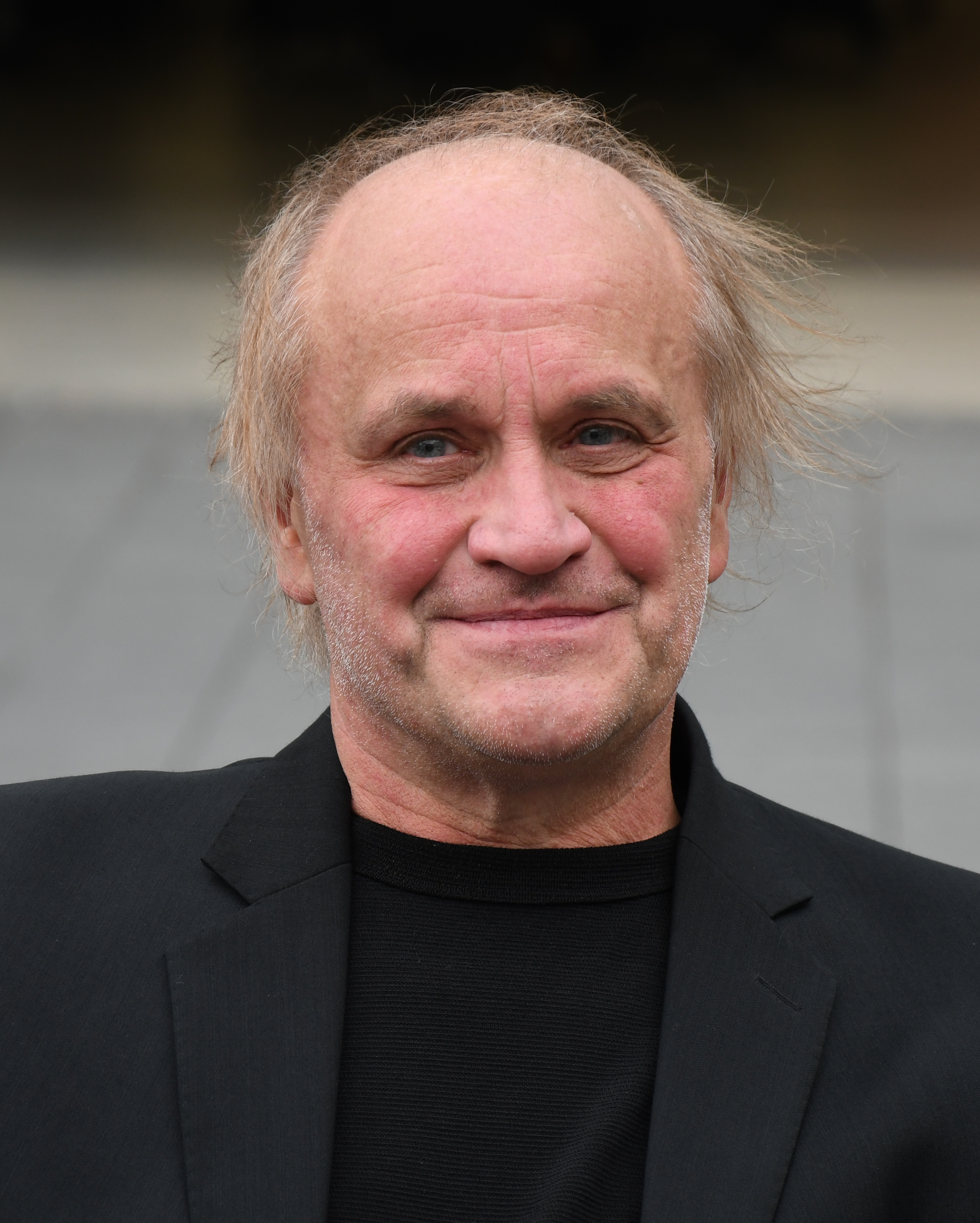
- Michael Kocáb in 2018

Minister for Human Rights and Minorities
- In office 23 January 2009 – 23 March 2010
- Prime Minister: Mirek Topolánek; Jan Fischer
- Preceded by: Džamila Stehlíková
- Succeeded by: Jiří Dienstbier Jr. (since 2014)

Personal details
- Born: 28 July 1954 (age 72) Prague, Czechoslovakia
- Party: OF (1989–1991)
- Other political affiliations: Green Party
- Spouse: Marsha Kocábová (1983–2010)
- Domestic partner: Lejla Abbasová (2009–2014)
- Children: Natálie; Michael; Jessica; David

Michael Kocáb (born 28 July 1954) is a Czech composer, singer, and political activist. He is the leader of Pražský výběr, a popular music band suppressed by the Czechoslovak communist regime in the 1980s.

In the spring of 1989, Kocáb, with Michal Horacek, founded the "Bridge" initiative; after founding of Civic Forum (CF) on November 19, 1989, he organized together with Horacek all negotiations of CF with the communist Prime Minister and his cabinet.

On behalf of CF, Kocáb was also responsible for negotiations with representatives of the Czechoslovak army. Using his significant political influence, he managed with several people to put through Václav Havel as the sole candidate of CF for the duty of the president – as Havel spoke of this in February 1990 in his speech to the US Congress in 1990.

From 1990 to 1992 he was a member of the Federal Assembly of the CSSR and the CFSR. In his first speeches during joint meetings of the House of Commons and the Chamber of Nations of the Federal Assembly, Kocáb repeatedly demanded an end to the Soviet occupation and declared the Treaty on the temporary stay of Soviet troops in Czechoslovakia invalid. Kocáb led a parliament commission which negotiated the repatriation of Soviet soldiers from Czechoslovakia.

From 2009 to 2010 he held the position of Minister for Human Rights and National Minorities in the Government of the Czech Republic. During this time he brokered a controversial deal with the Squat Milada residents to move.

== Works ==
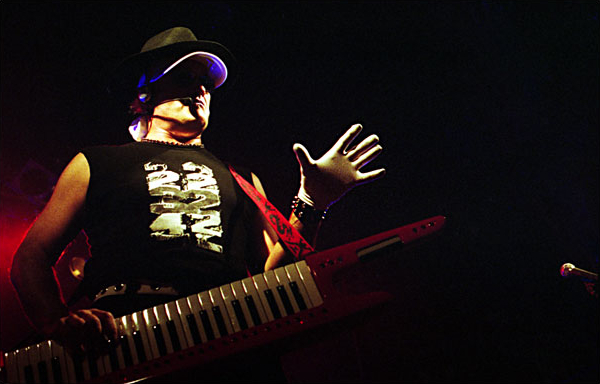
Michael Kocáb performs with Pražský Výběr in Opava.

He has composed music to more than 60 films:

Feature film music:

- Straka v hrsti – Juraj Herz (1983)
- Sladké starosti – Juraj Herz (1984)
- Prodavač humoru – Jiří Krejčík (1984)
- Zastihla mne noc – Juraj Herz (1985)
- Hledám dům holubí – Věra Plívová Šimková (1985)
- Wolf's Hole – Věra Chytilová (1986)
- Devět kruhů pekla – Milan Muchna (1987)
- The Post Office Girl – Édouard Molinaro (1988)
- King of Thieves – Ivan Fíla (2004)
- Jan Hus (2015)

Music to animated films:

- Bumerang – Jan Dudešek (1981)
- Paní Bída – Vlasta Pospíšilová (1983)
- Krysař – Jiří Bárta (1985)
- Romance z temnot – Jacques Drouin, Břetislav Pojar (1987)[59]
- Poslední lup – Jiří Barta (1987)
- Ako orechová škrupinka plávala na Vianočný ostrov – Jan Dudešek
- Ako vtáci na Vianoce spievali – Jan Dudešek

Music to short films:

- Odpady, které znamenají zisk (1979)
- Husitské trojměstí (1979)
- Oči modré, vlasy hnědé (1981)
- Priehody brušné (1981)
- Akvaráma (1981)
- Normální kluk (Ivan Lendl) (1982)
- Ruce – Setkání třetího druhu (1983)
- Potopa (1983)
- Mravenci chrání les (Václav Borovička)
- UNC-060 (1983)
- MS v lehké atletice – vytvořeno pro USA (1984)
- Praha – hledání ve zlatém městě (Artcentrum)
- Praha – neklidné srdce Evropy – Věra Chytilová[61]
- Jižní Čechy, aneb co Švejk neviděl (Artcentrum)
- Mucholapky na motýly – Václav Borovička (1985)
- Zuřivý reportér (Egon Erwin Kisch – copr. DEFA) (1985)
- Portrait of Hope (znělka OSN) (1985)
- Jediná generace – rež. Hoffmeister (1985)
- Holzarchitektur – Sváťa Beneš (1985)
- Ikony – Sváťa Beneš
- Šťastný, šťastný swing – Milan Peer (1985)
- Každý metr zeleně – Josef Císařovský (1986)
- Kalkula – Miroslav Adamec (1986)
- Our Water our Lives – pro OSN (1987)
- Jost Burgi – Michal Havas (1988)

Kocab has also been involved in musical compositions for a number of audiovisual projects and plays:

Audiovisual projects:

- EXPO 86 – český pavilón – Actorscop, Selektoráma, Rondovize (1986)
- EXPO 86 – kanadský pavilón (Roundhouse) – Vivat Edisoni (1986)

Laterna Magika:

- Československo – kvadrofonní ticho (1982)
- Odysseus (1986)
- Jednoho dne v Praze

Drama:

- Ondina – L. Pistorius
- Skřivánek – Jean Anouilh – Západočeské divadlo (1984)
- Othello – Realistické divadlo (1987)

Solo discography:

- Povídali, že mu hráli, 1988
- Za kyslík, 2002
- Abstract, 2016

Book:

- KOCÁB, Michael: Vabank. 1989–1991. Sametová revoluce. Odsun sovětských vojsk. (Velvet Revolution. Withdrawal of Soviet Army). Praha: Euromedia Group, 2019. 591 s. ISBN 978-80-7617-844-1

== Business interests ==
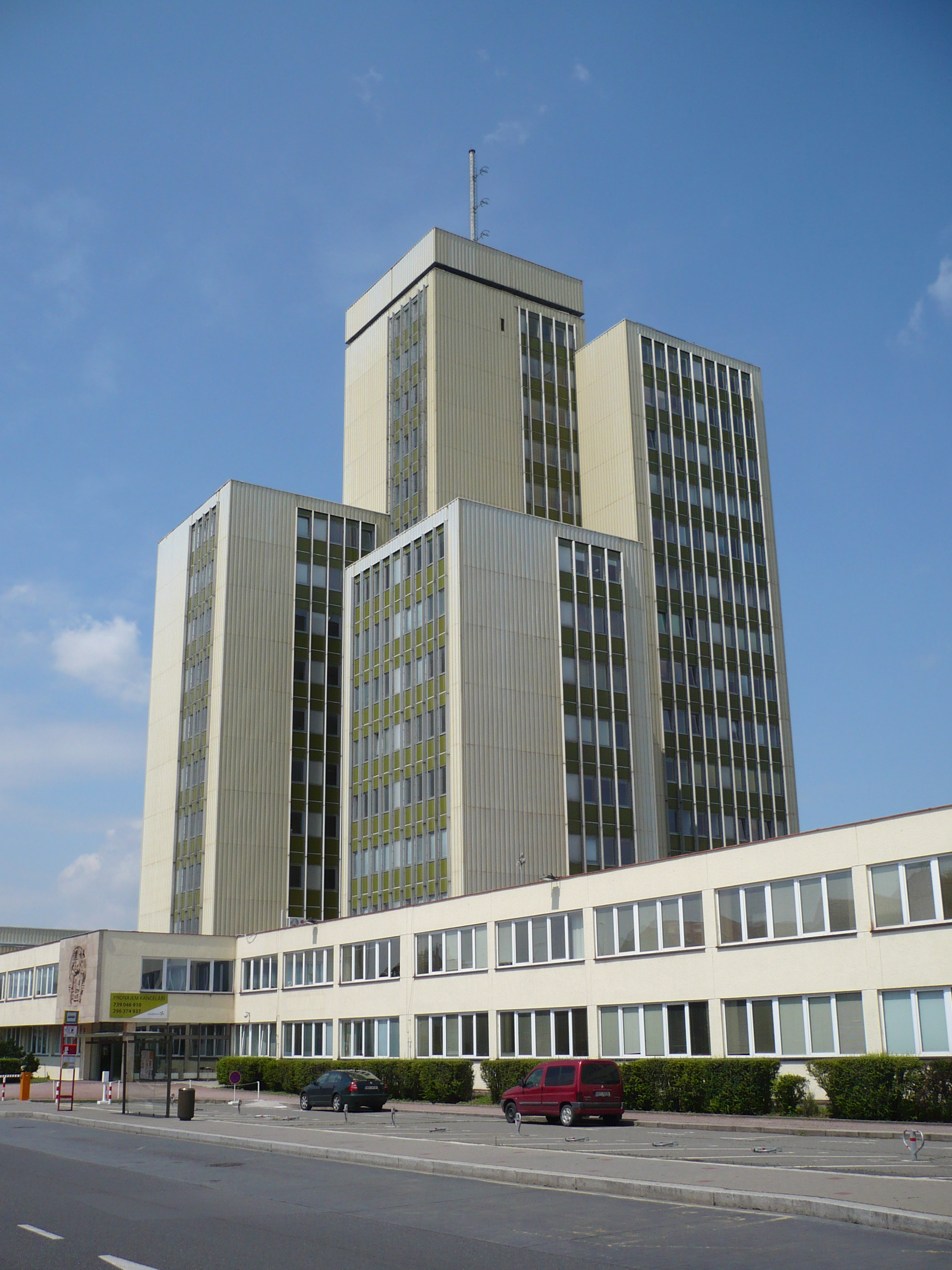
Tower of Montované stavby Praha, registered office of MSP, IPF TREND and IC TREND

In April 1990, together with Oldřich Lichtenberg and Miloslav Zapletal, Kocáb founded a company called Art Production K, where he served as chairman of the board. In May 1991 he became board member of newly privatized building company Montované stavby Praha (MSP). In January 1992 MSP founded Investment privatization fund TREND (IPF TREND) and Kocáb became chairman of its board. Another board Member was his brother-in-law Martin Kratochvíl. In January 1993, the companies Art Production K (27.5%), Bonton (27.5%), MSP (10%), and Bankovní dům SKALA (35%) founded a limited liability investment company IC TREND to manage the IPF TRENT portfolio for a fee. In February 1995 the managers of IPF TREND founded a closely owned corporation IC TREND for the same purpose. In August 1995 Kocáb, Kratochvíl and other owners of IC TREND sold the company to broker Královéhradecká brokerská společnost (KBS) for a substantial amount of money. The new owners of IC TREND used the acquired company as a vehicle to strip dispersed shareholders of IPF TREND from its assets. After a first fraudulent transaction by KBS managers, used to cover the costs associated with purchase of IC TREND, Kocáb and Kratochvíl resigned from the board of IPF TREND.

== Government work ==
During 2009-2010 Kocáb was Minister for Human Rights and National Minorities in the Government of the Czech Republic. During that time he brokered a deal to move the Squat Milada group, avoiding violence, from the dilapidated vila to Truhlářská 11 for one crown a month. The move was controversial and brought criticism.

== See also ==
- Natálie Kocábová
