= Petr Hapka =

Czech composer and singer (1944–2014)

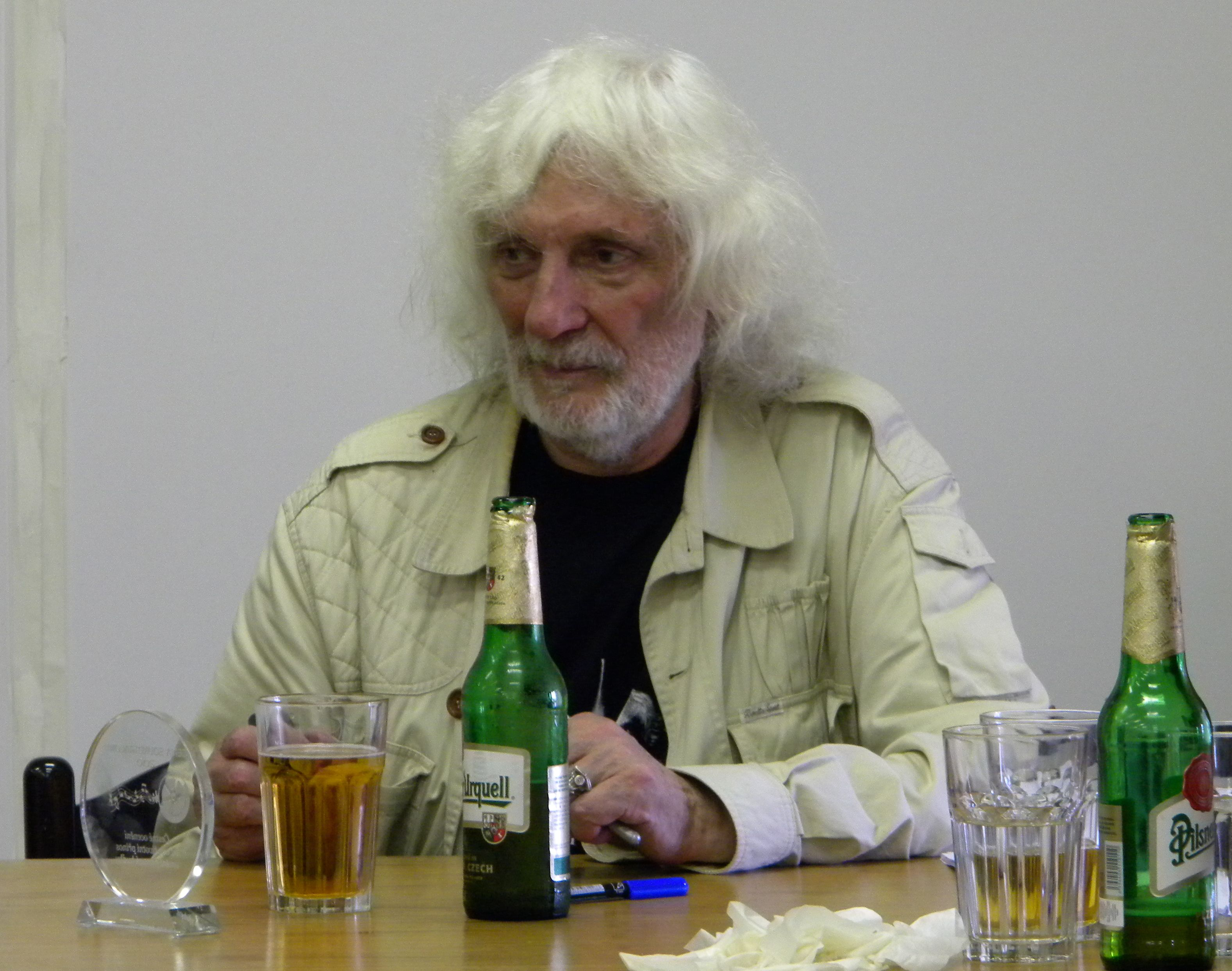
- Hapka in 2010
- Born: 13 May 1944; Prague, Protectorate of Bohemia and Moravia
- Died: 25 November 2014 (aged 70); Okoř, Czech Republic
- Occupations: Composer, conductor, vocalist

Petr Hapka (13 May 1944 – 25 November 2014) was a Czech composer, one of the most significant composers of Czech film music scores. He is known for his collaborations with the lyricist Michal Horáček.

== Discography ==
Studio albums

- 1987: Potměšilý host with Hana Hegerová & Michal Horáček
- 1988: V penziónu Svět with Michal Horáček
- 1996: Citová investice with Michal Horáček
- 2001: Mohlo by tu být i líp with Michal Horáček
- 2006: Strážce plamene with Michal Horáček
- 2009: Kudykam with Michal Horáček
- 2011: Tante Cose da Veder with Michal Horáček & Ondřej Brzobohatý

== Film score (selected) ==
- 1973: Akce Bororo
- 1976: Den pro mou lásku
- 1976: Léto s kovbojem
- 1977: Ružové sny
- 1978: Panna a netvor
- 1979: Deváté srdce
- 1981: Upír z Feratu
- 1983: Tisícročná včela
- 1984: Fešák Hubert
- 1985: Perinbaba
- 1987: Copak je to za vojáka...
- 1989: Vážení přátelé, ano
- 1993: Edudant and Francimor
- 1995: Bylo nás pět
- 1999: Hanele
- 2002: Fimfárum Jana Wericha

== Awards ==
Year	Nominated work	Award	Category	Result
2000	Hanele	Czech Lion	Best Music	Nominated
2003	Fimfárum Jana Wericha	Czech Lion	Best Music	Nominated
