= Michal Horáček =

Czech writer and businessman (born 1952)

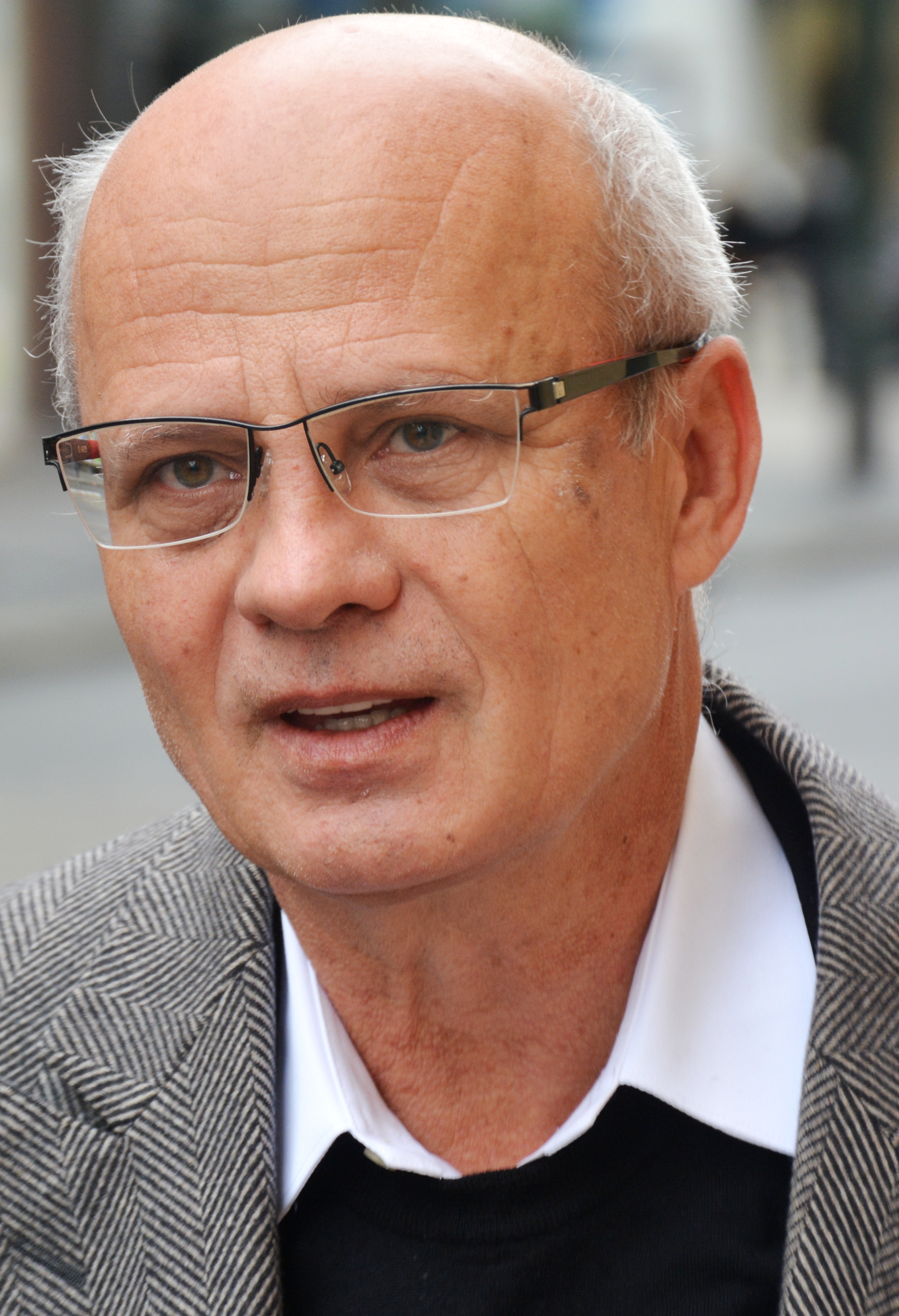

Personal details
- Born: 23 July 1952 (age 74) Prague, Czechoslovakia (now Czech Republic)
- Party: Independent
- Spouses: Rut Horáčková (m. 1976–2010) Michaela Hořejši (m. 2012)
- Children: 3
- Relatives: Jaroslav Heyrovský (great-uncle)
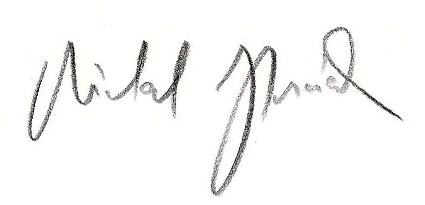
- Signature
- Website: michalhoracek.cz

Michal Horáček (born 23 July 1952) is a Czech entrepreneur, lyricist, poet, writer, journalist and music producer. From 2007 until 2010, he was the chairman of the Czech Academy of Popular Music. He founded Czech betting company Fortuna. He stood to become Czech president in the 2018 presidential election, but came in 4th in the first round, failing to advance.

== 2018 presidential election ==
In April 2016, Horáček announced his possible candidacy in the 2018 Czech presidential election. Horáček announced his candidacy on 7 October 2016. He officially launched his campaign on 3 November 2016. He said that he wanted his campaign to be based on respect for all people and their opinions.

Horáček announced his advisers on 9 February 2017, including former Slovak presidential candidate Magdaléna Vášáryová, nuclear energy safety expert Dana Drábová, and surgeon Pavel Pafko. On 16 April 2017, Horáček started gathering the 50,000 signatures required for participation in the election. On 6 May he reported that he had gathered the required number of signatures. Horáček finished fourth of the nine candidates, with 9.18% of the vote. Horáček then endorsed Jiří Drahoš for the second round. Radim Procházka and Robin Kvapil released a documentary film in 2018 about Horaček's run for presidency, entitled We Can Do Better.

== Political views ==
Horáček once said that "left-wing thinking isn't thinking", but later said that he had changed his mind and started to consider it more seriously. He describes himself as neither left-wing nor right-wing, but his platform for the 2018 presidential election was described by political scientists as left-wing. He supports European Union membership but would not oppose a referendum about leaving it.

Horáček stated in July 2016 that opposing immigration was "like opposing rain", and added that Czechs have historically helped immigrants. He has expressed opposition to migration quotas and to accepting large numbers of refugees, saying that the Czech Republic should not accept immigrants that Czechs do not want to accept.

== Personal life ==
Horáček is a Roman Catholic. His great-uncle Jaroslav Heyrovský, a chemist and inventor, became the first Czech recipient of the Nobel Prize in 1959.

== Discography ==
Studio albums

- 1987: Potměšilý host with Hana Hegerová & Petr Hapka
- 1988: V penziónu Svět with Petr Hapka
- 1996: Citová investice with Petr Hapka
- 2000: Richard Müller a hosté with Richard Müller & Jan Saudek
- 2001: Mohlo by tu být i líp with Petr Hapka
- 2003: Tak to chodí with Jarda Svoboda
- 2006: Strážce plamene with Petr Hapka
- 2008: Ohrožený druh
- 2009: Kudykam with Petr Hapka
- 2011: Tante Cose da Veder with Petr Hapka & Ondřej Brzobohatý
- 2012: O lásce, cti a kuráži
- 2012: Michal Horáček Tribute
- 2013: Český kalendář

== Bibliography ==
- 1983: Království za koně, Olympia
- 1984: Zpráva z Kentucky, Turf klub SSM
- 1990: Jak pukaly ledy, Ex libris
- 1996: Los a sázka, Fortuna
- 2002: Kdo víc vsadí, ten víc bere with Ladislav Verecký, Nakladatelství Lidové noviny
- 2004: O české krvi otců vlasti, Nakladatelství Lidové noviny
- 2007: O tajemství královny krav, Nakladatelství Lidové noviny
- 2009: Kudykam, Nakladatelství Lidové noviny
- 2012: Český kalendář, Nakladatelství Lidové noviny
- 2012: Habitus hazardního hráče, Nakladatelství Lidové noviny

== Awards ==
Year	Award	Result
1982	Awards of World Press Institute	Won
