= Jiří Jelínek (trumpeter) =

Background information
- Born: Jiří Jelínek; 6 July 1922
- Origin: Tis u Blatna, Czechoslovakia
- Died: 16 October 1984 (aged 62)
- Genres: Jazz
- Occupations: Trumpeter singer actor
- Instrument: Trumpet

Jiří Jelínek (6 July 1922 – 16 October 1984) was a Czech painter, illustrator, jazz trumpeter, and popular singer, one of the music legends of the Semafor Theatre in 1960s. His hoarse singing voice – similar to Louis Armstrong's – earned him the nickname "The Czech Satchmo".

== Biography ==
Jelínek was born at Tis u Blatna.

He studied painting and illustration as a pupil of František Tichý, but also showed early promise as a talented and skilful trumpeter. At first he worked as a professional painter and illustrator, and played in various amateur jazz ensembles, but in 1945 he began a part-time professional career as a trumpeter with the Karel Vlach Orchestra and the Gustav Brom Orchestra and began to use the distinctive, hoarse singing voice which later became one of his most notable characteristics. Jelínek left the Karel Vlach Orchestra and joined the Taneční orchestr Československého rozhlasu (Dance Orchestra of the Czechoslovak Radio), still dividing his time between his two part-time professional careers. In 1963 joined the Semafor Theatre as a replacement for Waldemar Matuška of the successful Semafor duo Matuška/Pilarová. In the event, both Matuška and Pilarová left to work with the Rokoko Theatre, and the Semafor's founders, Jiří Suchý and Jiří Šlitr, brought in Jana Malknechtová to partner Jelínek. Suchý and Šlitr composed "Motýl" (The Butterfly) for the duo. It became one of the best-selling recordings of its time. Jelínek sang other Semafor hits, including "Zčervená", "Bolí mě hlava" and Chlupatý kaktus. He also took an acting role in the 1964 film Kdyby tisíc klarinetů. Jelínek admired (and convincingly imitated) the famous jazz trumpeter and singer Louis Armstrong, whom he met during Armstrong's first visit to Prague and to whom he dedicated the song "Hello Satchmo". In 1963 he left the Semafor Theatre to perform with his own sextet. In 1968 he was one of the few members of the Karel Duba Orchestra to survive a tragic bus accident during their tour of Mongolia. The incident left a permanent mark on Jelínek's state of mind. He gradually retired from music, devoted himself to painting and worked for Czech Railways in Prague's Main railway station until his death in 1984 in Prague.

== Filmography ==
- Kdyby tisíc klarinetů (If a Thousand Clarinets) 1964
- Vratné lahve 2006 (song "Motýl" (The Butterfly), together with Jana Malknechtová)

== Discography ==
- Jiří Jelínek: Motýl, [CD], Radioservis (FR 0142-2).
