= Dobře placená procházka =

Czech musical and film

Dobře placená procházka (English title: A Walk Worthwhile or A Well Paid Walk) is a Czech musical and film.

== History ==
This "jazz opera" was written by Jiří Suchý and Jiří Šlitr. The play was directed by Ján Roháč, and had its premiere on 15 June 1965 at the Semafor Theatre. It was also performed at various theatres throughout Europe, in Finland, Belgium, and Yugoslavia. It was soon adapted into a popular television film.

In 2007, the play was performed at the National Theatre in Prague.

== Film ==
- Directed by Miloš Forman and Ján Pele.
- Jiří Suchý as Postman
- Eva Pilarová as Vanilka
- Jiří Šlitr as Advocate
- René Gabzdyl as Uli
- Hana Hegerová as Auntie from Liverpool

== Productions ==
=== Divadlo Semafor, Praha ===
- Directed by Miloš Forman. Premiere: 15 June 1966.
- Jiří Suchý as Postman
- Eva Pilarová/Naďa Urbánková as Vanilka
- Jiří Šlitr as Advocate
- René Gabzdyl as Uli
- Hana Hegerová/Naďa Urbánková as Aunt Brockefeller

=== National Theatre, Prague ===
- Directed by Miloš Forman and Petr Forman. Premiere: 22 April 2007.
- Jiří Suchý/Petr Macháček/Zbyněk Fric as Postman
- Dagmar Zázvůrková/Jana Malá as Vanilka
- Petr Stach/Zbyněk Fric as Uli
- Petr Píša/Tomáš Trapl/Lukáš Kumpricht as Advocate
- Tereza Hálová/Zuzana Stivínová/Jitka Molavcová as Aunt from Liverpool
- Jana Fabiánová/Beatrice Todorová/Irena Magnusková as Beautiful Girl
- Miroslav Lacko/Petr Wajsar as Accordionist
