= Hana Hegerová =

Slovak singer and actress (1931–2021)

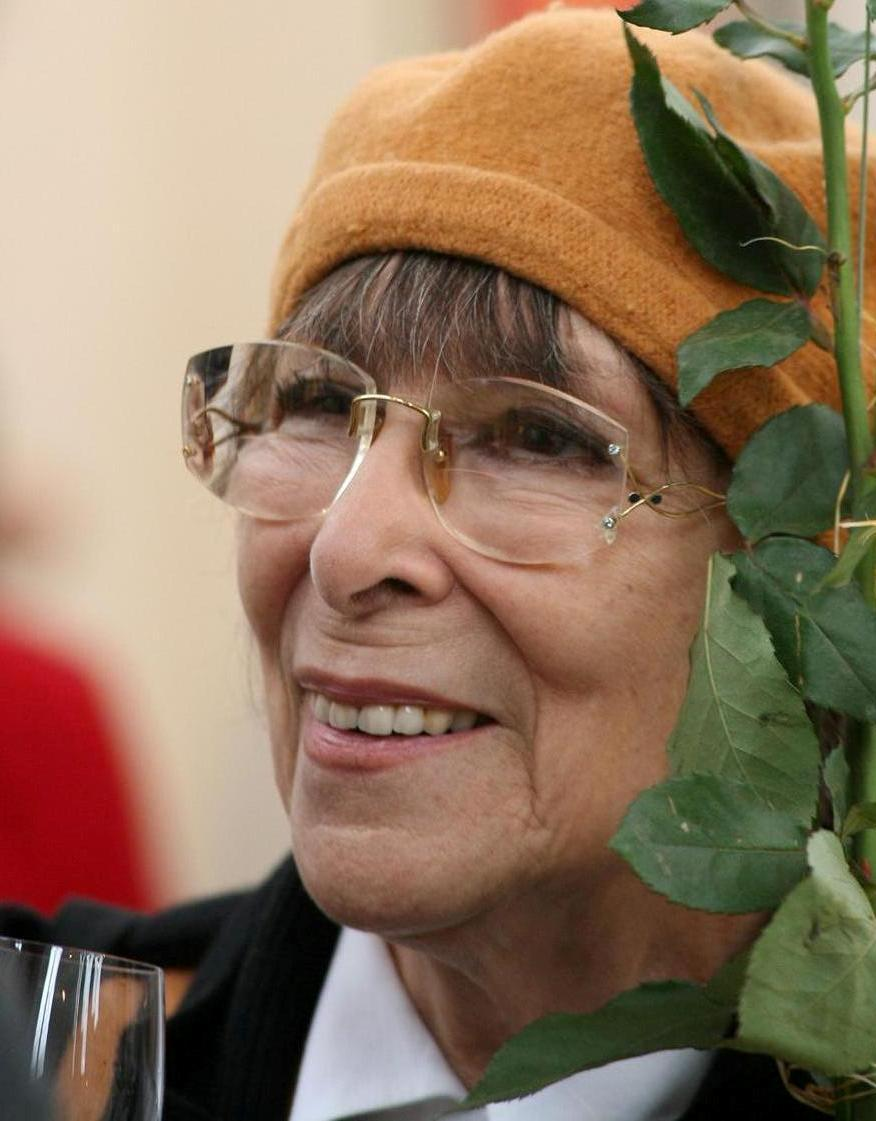
- Hegerová in 2006
- Born: 20 October 1931; Bratislava, Czechoslovakia
- Died: 23 March 2021 (aged 89); Prague, Czech Republic
- Occupations: Singer; actress
- Years active: 1953–2011
- Spouse: Dalibor Heger (div.)
- Children: Matúš Heger (1955–2015)
- Musical career
- Genres: Chanson
- Instrument: Vocals

Hana Hegerová (20 October 1931 – 23 March 2021) was a Slovak singer and actress. Often referred to as the Queen of Czechoslovak chanson, she gained popularity primarily as a singer of chansons. Outside of Czechoslovakia, Hegerová attained recognition especially in German-speaking countries.

== Early life ==
Hegerová was born Carmen Mária Štefánia Farkašová.

== Career ==
In 1954, Hegerová played the title role in the film Frona under the name Hana Čelková. She made her singing debut in Tatra Revue in Bratislava in 1957. After she came to Prague, the foremost Czech actor Jan Werich offered her an engagement in the ABC Theatre, but she refused. Hegerová performed at the Rokoko Theatre in Prague from 1958 until 2021. From 1961 to 1966 at the Semafor Theater, she appeared in the jazz opera Dobře placená procházka by Jiří Suchý (libretto) and Jiří Šlitr (music), and film Kdyby tisíc klarinetů (If a Thousand Clarinets). Hegerová's repertoire included many chansons by Czech and Slovak authors, and also Czech versions of songs from the repertoire of Édith Piaf ("Mylord"), Jacques Brel ("Ne me quitte pas"), and songs by Kurt Weill ("Surabaya Johnny" and "The Barbara Song") and many others. In 1967, Hana Hegerová appeared at the Paris Olympia.

In 2002, Heregová received the Medal of Merit from Czech President Václav Havel. In 2014, she received the Order of Tomáš Garrigue Masaryk from President Miloš Zeman.

In August 2011, the national press announced that the diva decided to retire from the music industry, telling MusicServer: "I have decided that I no longer want it. I don't want to sing, I don't want to go public. I want to get rid of stress. Simply, the Hana Hegerová enterprise is terminated, only Hana Hegerová remains as a private person who finally wants to enjoy peaceful days with her dog. Wish me luck so that there are still lots of them left."

== Illness and death ==
In December 2014, Hegerová was hospitalized with serious heart problems in the General University Hospital in Prague.

She died on 23 March 2021 at 89 years old in Prague Hospital Na Homolce due to complications from a hip fracture.

== Discography ==
Studio albums

- 1966: Šansony s Hanou Hegerovou
- 1971: Recital
- 1973: Recital 2
- 1977: Lásko prokletá
- 1987: Potměšilý host
- 2010: Mlýnské kolo v srdci mém

Export albums

- 1967: Ich (aka Chansons)
- 1969: Hana Hegerová
- 1972: So geht es auf der Welt zu
- 1974: Fast ein Liebeslied
- 1975: Wir für euch
- 1987: Chansons (aka Wenn die Schatten)

== Filmography ==
Year	Title		Director(s)
Year	Original	English	Director(s)
1954	Frona	Frona	Jiří Krejčík
1957	Tam na konečné	At the Terminus	Ján Kadár and Elmar Klos
1960	Přežil jsem svou smrt	I Survived Certain Death	Vojtěch Jasný
1960	Policejní hodina	The Hour of the Cop	Otakar Vávra
1962	Zhasněte lampióny	Turn Off Lanterns	Ján Roháč and Vladimír Svitáček
1962	Neděle ve všední den	A Weekday Sunday	Félix Máriássy
1963	Naděje	The Hope	Karel Kachyňa
1963	Konkurs	Audition	Miloš Forman
1965	Kdyby tisíc klarinetů	If a Thousand Clarinets	Ján Roháč and Vladimír Svitáček
1966	Dobře placená procházka (TV film)	A Well-Paid Walk	Miloš Forman and Ján Roháč
1967	Ta naše písnička česká	This Is Our Czech Song	Zdeněk Podskalský
1967	Sedm žen Alfonse Karáska	Seven Wives of Alfons Karásek	Zdeněk Podskalský
1974	Třicet případů majora Zemana	Thirty Cases of Major Zeman	Jiří Sequens
1988	Lovec senzací	Stunner-fisher	Martin Hollý
1989	Fabrik der Offiziere (TV series)	The Officer Factory	Wolf Vollmar
1991	Poslední motýl	The Last Butterfly	Karel Kachyňa
2006	Kde lampy bloudí	Where the Lamps Roam	Jakub Kohák
2008	Nestyda	Nasty	Jan Hřebejk

== Awards ==
=== Major awards ===
Year	Nominated work	Award	Category	Result	
1962	"Szeptem"	Sopot Festival	Contest of Polish Songs – Best Interpretation	Silver	^{[A]}
1962	"Ošklivá neděle"	Sopot Festival	International contest – Best Song	Bronze	^{[B]}
1962	"Ošklivá neděle"	Sopot Festival	The Critics' Prize	Won	
1968	Unknown	Prague City Award	Unknown	Won	
1969	Unknown	Festwochen Wiesbaden	Unknown	Won	
1983	Unknown	tz Rose	July 15–22	Won	
1988	Potměšilý host	Golden Note	Best Album	Won	
1988	"Levandulová"	Golden Note	Best Song (shared with P.Hapka)	Won	
1988	Herself	Golden Note	Best Female Singer	Won	
2010	Herself	Anděl Awards	Female Singer of the Year	Nominated	^{[C]}
2010	Mlýnské kolo v srdci mém	Anděl Awards	Album of the Year	Nominated	^{[D]}
Lifetime honors and achievements
1974	Herself	H-D.Genscher Prize	Goldene Europa	Honored	
1974	Herself	Académie française	Ordre du Mérite de l'Education Artistique – Chevalier	Honored	
1995	Herself	Gramy Awards	The Hall of Fame	Inducted	
2002	Herself	Václav Havel Prize	The Medal of Merit	Honored	
2007	Herself	MOFFOM Award	Lifetime Achievement in Music Film	Honored	
2012	Herself	Prague 1 Assembly	Honorary citizenship	Honored	^{[E]}
2013	Herself	Pierre Lévy Prize	Ordre national du Mérite – Commandeur	Honored	
2014	Herself	Miloš Zeman Prize	Order of Tomáš Garrigue Masaryk – 1st Class	Honored	

Notes

- A "Szeptem" composed by Jerzy Abratowski for lyrics by Jacek Korczakowski, and the Gold award won by "Jesienna rozłąka" sung by Anita Traversi from Switzerland.
- B Hegerová shared the Bronze award along with Emil Dimitrov who entered the contest with "Arlekino". The Gold went to Greek Jeanne Yovanna for "Ti Krima", while Silver won by "Stav" by Ester Reichstadt from Israel.
- C The award for the Female Singer of the Year went to Lucie Bílá, while the second nominee was Lucie Vondráčková.
- D The category of the Album of the Year won by Tepláky aneb Kroky Františka Soukupa set by Nightwork band. Outlet People by Toxique group featured the rest of nominated works.
- E According to the municipal authorities, Prague 1 awards the Honorary citizenship title only exceptionally. As such, Hegerová became the first female ever and the fifth honoree in total, respectively (following writer Josef Topol, photographer Ladislav Sitenský, conductor Jaroslav Hrnčíř and architect Josef Hyzler).

=== Music polls ===
Zlatý slavík, Czechoslovakia

Year	Nominated work	Category	Result
1962	Herself	Singer	#6^{[F]}
1963	Herself	Singer	#6^{[G]}
1964	Herself	Female Singer	#5
1965	Herself	Female Singer	#7
1966	Herself	Female Singer	#6
1967	Herself	Female Singer	#5
1968	Herself	Female Singer	#8
1969	Herself	Female Singer	—N/a
1970	Herself	Female Singer	—N/a
1971	Herself	Female Singer	—N/a
1972	Herself	Female Singer	—N/a
1973	Herself	Female Singer	—N/a
1974	Herself	Female Singer	—N/a
1975	Herself	Female Singer	#8
1976	Herself	Female Singer	#7
1977	Herself	Female Singer	#8
1978	Herself	Female Singer	#7
1979	Herself	Female Singer	#8
1980	Herself	Female Singer	#12
1981	Herself	Female Singer	#12
1982	Herself	Female Singer	#10
1983	Herself	Female Singer	#13
1984	Herself	Female Singer	#18
1985	Herself	Female Singer	#17
1986	Herself	Female Singer	#17
1987	Herself	Female Singer	#17
1988	Herself	Female Singer	#20
1989	Herself	Female Singer	#14
1990	Herself	Female Singer	#14
1991	Herself	Female Singer	#14

Český slavík, Czech Republic

Year	Nominated work	Category	Result
1997	Herself	Female Singer	#15
1998	Herself	Female Singer	#13
1999	Herself	Female Singer	#17
2000	Herself	Female Singer	#22
2001	Herself	Female Singer	#22
2002	Herself	Female Singer	#17
2003	Herself	Female Singer	#17
2004	Herself	Female Singer	#17
2005	Herself	Female Singer	#12
2006	Herself	Female Singer	#12
2007	Herself	Female Singer	#14
2008	Herself	Female Singer	#14
2009	Herself	Female Singer	#16
2010	Herself	Female Singer	#15
2011	Herself	Female Singer	#15
2012	Herself	Female Singer	#28
2013	Herself	Female Singer	#25
2014	Herself	Female Singer	#27

Notes

- F The initial two editions of the Zlatý slavík poll included only one category for both, either male or female vocalists. Else in 1962, Hegerová would be ranked as the third most popular female singer, following Yvetta Simonová and Eva Pilarová.
- G In 1963, Hegerová entered the poll as the second most voted female vocalist in the country, following Pilarová.

== See also ==
- Hana a jej bratia (Slovak film, featuring music by Hegerová, from 2000)
- Strážce plamene ("Kdo by se díval nazpátek")
- Strážce plamene v obrazech ("Kdo by se díval nazpátek")
- Honorific nicknames in popular music

== Sources ==
- "Hana Hegerová → Biography". Czech-Slovak Film Database (in Czech and Slovak). POMO Media Group. csfd.cz.
- "Hana Hegerová → Filmography". Vachler Art Company (in Slovak). VAC. kinobox.cz.
