= Petr Wajsar =

Czech composer

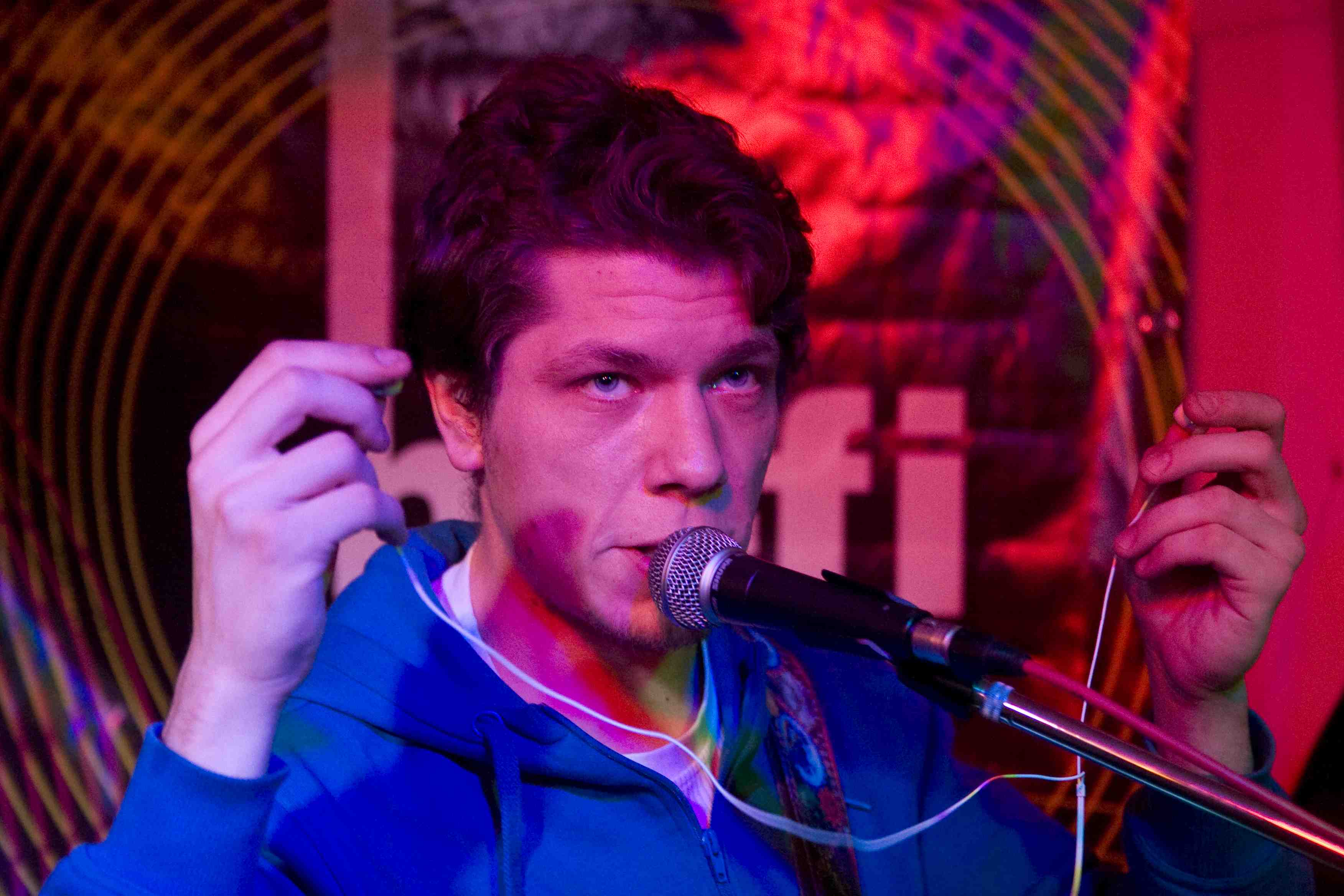
- Wajsar in 2009

Background information
- Born: 14 November 1977 (age 48); Prague, Czechoslovakia
- Occupation: Composer
- Website: www.wajsar.cz

Petr Wajsar (born 14 November 1977) is a Czech composer. His work has been performed by the Czech Philharmonic, the Berg Orchestra, and the Prague Symphony Orchestra. He is also known for composing the soundtrack for the 2024 video game expansion Factorio: Space Age.

== Career ==
Wajsar's music has been performed by the Berg Orchestra. In 2015, under the direction of Peter Vrábel, they performed Wajsar's Lime sinfonietta, an audio-visual collaboration with filmmakers Marek Bures and Michael Gahut, at the Prague Spring International Music Festival.

In 2016, the Czech Philharmonic performed Wajsar's "Four Angry Men and an Orchestra" at their annual open air concert, a piece featuring bassoons.

In 2017, at Prague Spring, Wajsar's "The Rest is Song" – a piece about the history of music in the 20th century – was premiered by the Berg orchestra with conductor Jan Kučera; Barbora Vacková described Wajsar as eclectic.

Wajsar wrote "8 Movements for a Fan", a melodrama for seven instruments, with recitation "inspired by a collection of poems in French by Paul Claudel, reminiscent of Japanese haiku", according to Jan Borek. The music, according to Borek was a "continuous stream", with dynamics and atmosphere shifting between the components. The piece was performed in October 2018 by the Berg orchestra conducted by Peter Vrábel.

That same year Wajsar won the Czech Lion Award for Best Music for the film Hastrman.

In 2021, writing for Wax and Wire, Julianne Kirk Doyle reviewed Birdie Pranks, Wajsar's collaboration with Karel Dohnal, who also performed the piece on the album Czech Music for Clarinet. Doyle noted the piece's variety and humor.

In September 2024, Wajsar's Violoncelloops concerto was premiered by the Czech Philharmonic during the Dvořák's Prague festival. Writing for Bachtrack, Frank Kuznik said wrote that Wajsar's music "rumbles, bangs and explodes off the stage [...] combining classical elements with contemporary sonics and beats." Kuznik had previously called Wajsar "one of the most versatile young composers in the Czech Republic" when reviewing Tramvestie, a soundtrack to a book of poems by Pavel Novotný.

Later in 2024, the soundtrack for the video game expansion Factorio: Space Age was released. For the soundtrack, he was nominated for an award in the "Music Supervision – Video Game" category for the 15th Hollywood Music in Media Awards.

== Works ==
=== Composition ===
- "Cat Haiku", 2007
- Lime Sinfonietta, 2015
- "Ciganska ouvertura (The Gypsy Overture)", 2016
- "Four Angry Men and an Orchestra", 2016
- "The Rest is Song", 2017
- "8 Movements for a Fan", 2018
- "The Beauty of Today", with Jan Trojan, Tomas Reindl, 2018
- "Generative Ambient", 2018
- Hastrman, 2018
- "Zlin Lines", 2019
- Tramvestie, with Pavel Novotný, 2019
- Prague Metamorphoses, 2021
- "Fagofonik for two bassoons", 2021
- Birdie Pranks, with Karel Dohnal, 2021
- "Infantaria", with Daniel Wajsar, 2022
- "Kraftveverk", 2024
- Violoncelloops, 2024
- Factorio: Space Age - Soundtrack, 2024

=== Performance ===
- 2007, accordionist, National Theatre in Prague, A Walk Worthwhile by Jiří Šlitr and Jiří Suchý
