= Hana Hegerová discography =

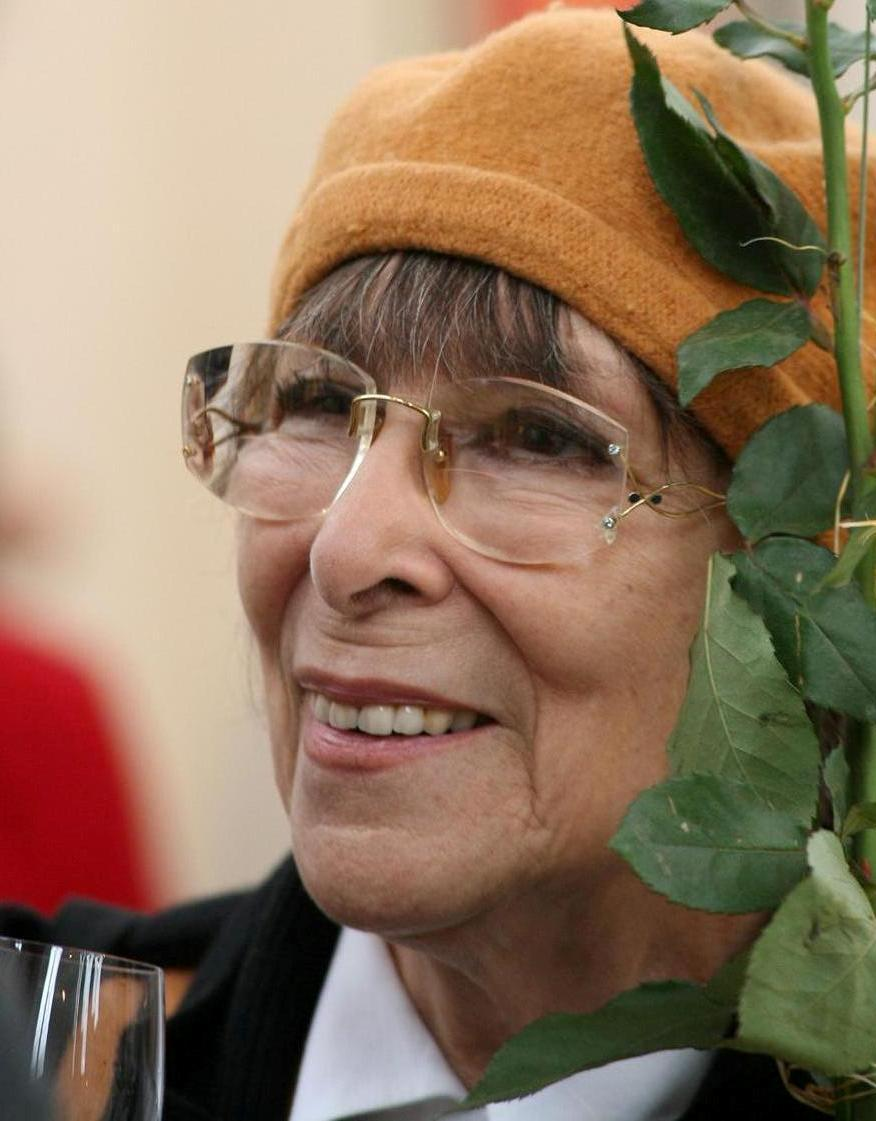
- Studio albums: 6
- Extended plays: 10
- Soundtrack albums: 1
- Live albums: 3
- Compilation albums: 8
- Singles: 18
- B-sides: 13
- Video albums: 2
- Export albums: 6
- Box sets: 3
- Other appearances: 2

Hana Hegerová released six studio albums, including one double set — Šansony s Hanou Hegerovou (1966), Recital (1971), Recital 2 (1973), Lásko prokletá (1977), Potměšilý host (1987) and Mlýnské kolo v srdci mém (2010). Each of them on Supraphon, with exception of her second album issued by Panton.

At the occasion of her 80th birthday anniversary, Hana Hegerová was awarded by the International Federation of the Phonographic Industry for the Czech Republic (ČNS IFPI) with the Diamond award for the total sale of her albums reaching 1,580,000 units.

== Albums ==
=== Studio albums ===
Year	Release details	Charts	Sales	Certifications
Year	Release details	CZ	Sales	Certifications
1966	Šansony s Hanou Hegerovou: Label: Supraphon (#10241); Format: LP			—N/a
1971	Recital: Label: Panton (#11 0252); Format: LP			—N/a
1973	Recital 2: Label: Supraphon (#1 13 1310, #1813 0177); Format: LP, MC			—N/a
1977	Lásko prokletá: Label: Supraphon (#1 13 2235); Format: LP			—N/a
1987	Potměšilý host: Label: Supraphon (#1113 3945, #10 3945); Format: LP, MC, CD			Platinum
2010	Mlýnské kolo v srdci mém: Label: Supraphon (#99925 60262); Format: CD, DVD (limited)	1	CZ: 45,000	2× Platinum^{[A]}
"—" denotes an album that did not chart and/or was not released in that region.

Notes

- A Mlýnské kolo v srdci mém (among others, featuring also her cover version of "The Windmills of Your Mind") was classified as the 3rd best-selling album of the year in 2010 in the Czech Republic, following albums Banditi di Praga by Kabát, and Bílé Vánoce by Lucie Bílá. The set was nominated for the Album of the Year at the Anděl Awards 2010, while Hegerová herself was nominated in the Best Female Singer category.

=== Compilations ===
Year	Release details	Charts	Sales	Certifications
Year	Release details	CZ	Sales	Certifications
1984	Ohlédnutí: Label: Supraphon (#1013 2875, #1813 0454); Format: LP, MC			—N/a
1991	Paběrky (aka Paběrky a pamlsky): Label: Supraphon (#11 1658, #11 1390); Format: 2×LP, CD	11		—N/a
1997	Rýmování o životě: Label: B&M Music (#BM0093); Format: 2×CD, MC			—N/a
2000	Síň slávy: Label: Sony Music / Bonton (#495266); Format: CD			—N/a
2005	Můj dík: Hana Hegerová zpívá písně Pavla Kopty: Label: Supraphon (#SU5633-2); Format: CD	14		—N/a
2006	Všechno nejlepší: Label: Supraphon (#SU5726-2); Format: CD	1	CZ: 33,500	2× Platinum^{[B]}
"—" denotes an album that did not chart and/or was not released in that region.

Notes

- B "Všechno nejlepší" compilation won "Deska roku" award as the Best-selling Album of a Female Singer in 2006, for the initial sale of 27,984 copies. As of March 2007, the total number reached 33,500 units. (The additional nominated albums featured Měls mě vůbec rád by Ewa Farna and Boomerang by Lucie Vondráčková.)

=== Live albums ===
Year	Release details	Charts	Sales	Certifications
Year	Release details	CZ	Sales	Certifications
1991	Live: Label: Supraphon (#11 0444); Format: LP, MC, CD			—N/a
1999	Bratislava - Nová scéna: Label: B&M Music (#538762); Format: MC, CD			—N/a
2006	Koncert: Label: Sony BMG (#86970 3793–2); Format: CD	10	CZ: 7,500	Gold
"—" denotes an album that did not chart and/or was not released in that region.

=== Export albums ===
Year	Release details
1967	Ich (aka Chansons): Label: Philips (#843 955); Format: LP
1969	Hana Hegerová: Label: Philips (#844 385, #6434 236); Format: LP
1972	So geht es auf der Welt zu: Label: Decca (#16 776); Format: LP
1974	Fast ein Liebeslied: Label: Decca (#17 060); Format: LP
1975	Wir für euch: Label: Telefunken (#105 441); Format: LP
1987	Chansons (aka Wenn die Schatten): Label: Supraphon (#1113 4256, #101913, #10 4256); Format: LP, MC, CD

=== Box sets ===
Year	Release details	Charts	Sales	Certifications
Year	Release details	CZ	Sales	Certifications
1996	Zlatá kolekce: Label: B&M Music (#BM0047); Format: 6×CD			—N/a
2013	Zlatá kolekce (1957-2010): Label: Supraphon (#SU 6050–2); Format: 3×CD	1		—N/a
2016	Cesta (Písně (1960-2016): Label: Supraphon (#SU 6350–2); Format: 10×CD	16		—N/a

=== Soundtracks ===
Year	Release details
1996	Starci a klarinety: Label: BMG Ariola (#74321 41118); Format: CD

== Extended plays ==
Year	Release details	Notes
1961	Písně ze hry "Bapopo": Label: Supraphon (#0120); Format: 7"	Four track EP, featuring also "Dnes naposled" by Hegerová as the second song on A-side.
1962	Jaro: Label: Supraphon (#0149); Format: 7"	Featuring also "Černá Jessie"
1963	Z pásma Jonáš a Tingl-Tangl: Label: Supraphon (#0189); Format: 7"	Four track EP, featuring "Zlá neděle" by Hegerová as the lead. The additional songs performed by Jiří Suchý.
1964	Život je teraz: Label: Supraphon (#1816); Format: 7"	
1964	Oh, Daddy: Label: Supraphon (#0218); Format: 7"	
1964	Zahraj nám, Joe!: Label: Supraphon (#0219); Format: 7"	
1965	Prague Songs: Label: Supraphon (#SUK 34583); Format: 7"	Four track EP, featuring "Student mit den roten ohren" ("Študent s rudýma ušima"), "Der böse Sonntag" ("Zlá neděle"), "Liebe (Das ist nur schall und rauch)" ("Láska, to jsou jenom písmena") and "Fahr doch Allein Karussell"
1965	Study Group of Traditional Jazz: Label: Supraphon (#SUK 35563); Format: 7"	Four track EP, featuring "Oh, Daddy!", "Room Rent Blues", "Lonesome Railroad Blues" and "Everybody Loves My Baby".
1969	Lásko má: Label: Panton (#030212); Format: 7"	Four track EP, featuring also "Cesta", "Můj dík" and "Lásko prokletá"
1972	Mapa lásky (La carte du tendre): Label: Panton (#330286); Format: 7"	Four track EP, featuring also "Rozmary", "Co mi dáš (Feuilles mortes)" and "Išiel Macek do Malacek"

== Singles ==
Year	Release details		
Year	Single	Catalogue	Label
1960	"Noc"	(#013345)	Supraphon
1962	"Študent s rudýma ušima"	(#013244)	Supraphon
1963	"Zlá neděle"	(#0189)	Supraphon
1963	"Uspávanka"	(#20062)	Supraphon
1964	"Kiki"	(#013190)	Supraphon
1964	"V opeře" with Waldemar Matuška & Karel Gott	(#013529)	Supraphon
1967	"Meine Stadt"/"Wozu ist Liebe da"	(#346 047 PF)	Philips
1969	"Pohrdání"	(#0 43 0783)	Supraphon
1974	"So Geht Es Auf Der Welt Zu"	(#D 29 245)	Decca
1978	"Tak už bal"	(#1 43 2179)	Supraphon
1980	"Kinematograf"	(#8143 0052)	Panton
1984	"Čas na prázdniny"	(#1143 2905)	Supraphon
1986	"Levandulová" with Petr Hapka	(#1143 3337)	Supraphon
1989	"Čerešne"	(#110253-7311)	Supraphon

=== Airplay singles ===
Year	Song	Charts		Album
Year	Song	CZ		Album
Year	Song	50	100	Album
2007	"Kdo by se díval nazpátek"	45	—	Strážce plamene
2010	"Já vím"	48	—	Mlýnské kolo v srdci mém
2010	"Stará píseň" featuring Jaromír Nohavica	27	—	Mlýnské kolo v srdci mém
2011	"Čas na prázdniny"	15	—	Mlýnské kolo v srdci mém
"—" denotes a single that did not chart.

== Videos ==
=== Video albums ===
Year	Release details	Charts	Sales	Certifications
Year	Release details	CZ	Sales	Certifications
2006	Koncert: Label: Sony BMG (#86972 0353–9); Format: DVD	14	CZ: 10,000	5× Platinum^{[C]}
2011	Pasiáns: Písně a dokumenty (1962-1994): Label: Supraphon (#SU 7118–9); Format: DVD	5		—N/a
"—" denotes an album that did not chart and/or was not released in that region.

Notes

- C The DVD release of Koncert was nominated for "Deska roku" as the Best-selling DVD/VHS of 2006. However, it lost in favor Bouře Live by Daniel Landa (with 9,301 sold copies). The third nominee was Lucie Vondráčková for Kliperang.

== See also ==
- Strážce plamene v obrazech ("Kdo by se díval nazpátek")
