= Ferdinand Havlík =

- Born: 17 June 1928; Brno, Czechoslovakia
- Died: 28 October 2013 (aged 85); Czech Republic
- Occupations: Composer, clarinetist
- Years active: 1959–2013
- Known for: Co-founding Semafor theater, film compositions, swing band
- Notable work: Semafor musical theater

Ferdinand Havlík (17 June 1928 – 28 October 2013) was a Czech composer, and clarinet player. In 1959, Havlík and actor Jiří Suchý co-founded the Semafor musical theater in Prague. Havlík also became Semafor's head composer following the death of Jiří Šlitr in 1969. In addition to Semafor, he worked as a film composer and started a swing band in the 1970s.

Born in Brno, Czechoslovakia, in 1928, Havlík died on October 28, 2013, at the age of 85.
