= Waldemar Matuška =

Czech actor

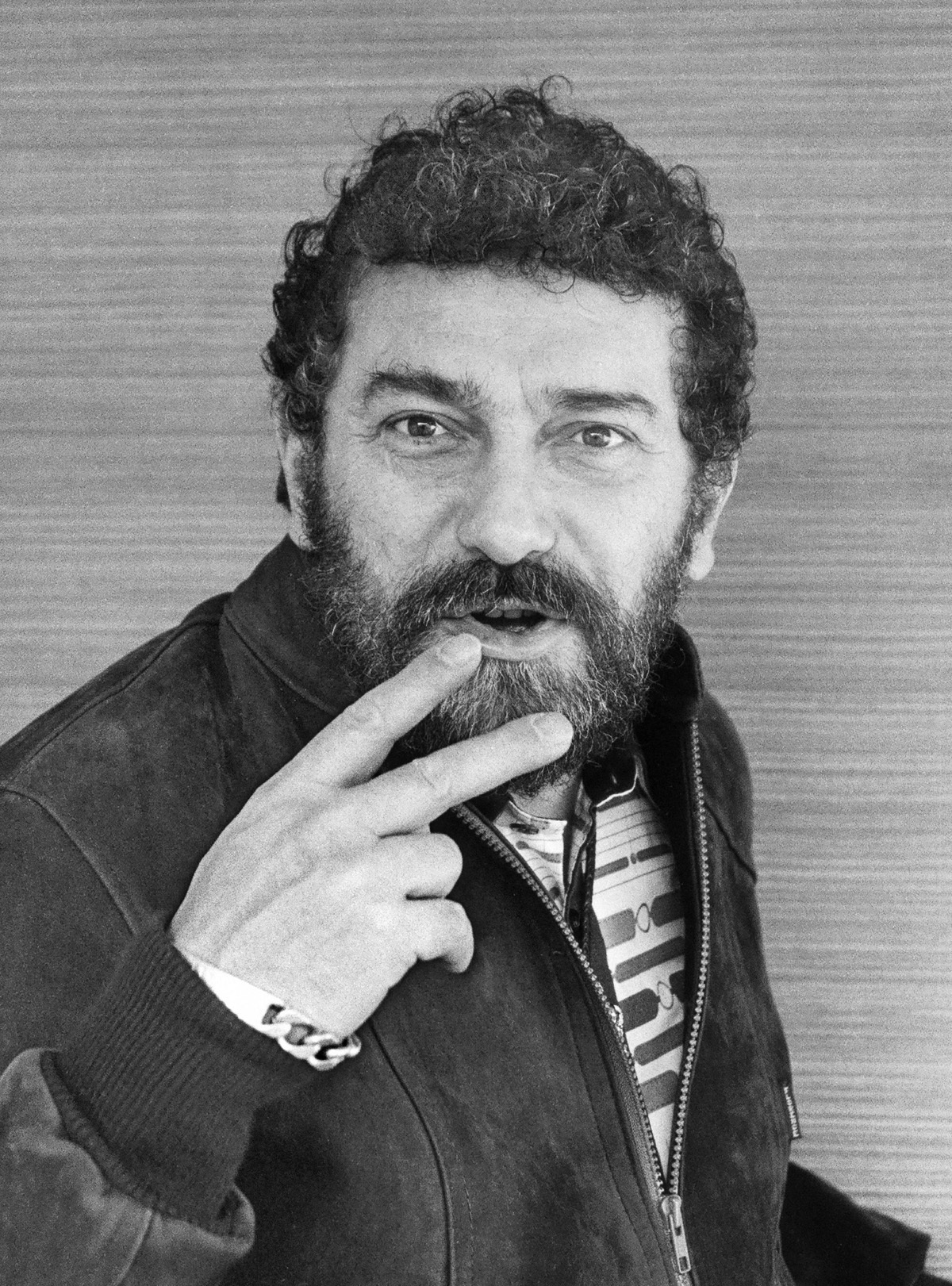
- Waldemar Matuška in 1980

Background information
- Born: Vladislav Matuška; 2 July 1932; Košice, Czechoslovakia
- Died: 30 May 2009 (aged 76) St. Petersburg, Florida, United States
- Genres: Country; pop
- Occupations: Singer, Actor
- Instruments: Vocals, guitar, banjo, double bass
- Years active: 1960–2009

Waldemar Matuška (Czech pronunciation: [ˈvaldɛmar ˈmatuʃka]; 2 July 1932 – 30 May 2009) was a Czech singer who became popular in his homeland during the 1960s and 1970s. In 1986, he immigrated to the United States.

== Early career ==
Waldemar Matuška was born Vladislav Matuška on 2 July 1932 in Košice, Czechoslovakia (now Slovakia). He spent his whole childhood in Prague. His mother was a singer in the Vienna and Košice operetta theatres. He trained at a glassmaking school and worked in glassworks Poděbrady as a glassmaker. He performed on various musical instruments (mostly banjo, guitar, contrabass or drums with many different bands. In 1960 he recorded his first song Suvenýr (Souvenir). Later he became an actor and singer of the theatre Semafor. On the stage he performed with Karel Štědrý, Jiří Suchý, Hana Hegerová and others, starting in 1961, with Eva Pilarová. He won the Zlatý slavík ("Golden Nightingale") music poll twice, in 1962 and 1967, and placed second several times.

As his popularity grew he started acting in movies and writing songs for movies. Waldemar and Eva Pilarová left Semafor and joined the ensemble of the theatre Rokoko. But Pilarová soon returned to Semafor, while Matuška began singing with Helena Vondráčková, Marta Kubišová, Jitka Zelenková and others. He participated in other projects besides the theatre, mainly duets with Hana Hegerová and Karel Gott.

== Emigration and late life ==
In 1976 he married the choir singer Olga Blechová (from the duet Olga and Irena). His popularity at home was high, and he also gave concerts abroad, limited with his interpretation of songs only in Czech. In 1986 he left Czechoslovakia and settled with his wife in St. Petersburg, Florida, United States, with the help from his wife’s brother. Meanwhile, in Czechoslovakia, the Communist party banned all his songs, destroyed recordings of his LP gramophone record Jsem svým pánem ('I'm My Own Master'), deleted his opening song in the popular television series Chalupáři (just the melody remained) and changed the title of the TV series Rozpaky kuchaře Svatopluka ('Doubts of cook Svatopluk'). Matuška continued to perform in the United States, mostly for emigrants from Czechoslovakia.

After the 1989 Velvet Revolution in Czechoslovakia, his songs were returned to their proper place in the television series. He lived in Florida, at times performing in the Czech Republic. He and Olga continued to record, and with Florida's Kenny Veenstra producing, he released 3 final albums.

Matuška died in St. Petersburg, Florida on 30 May 2009, of pneumonia and heart failure, aged 76. Asthma may have contributed to his death. He was buried at the Vyšehrad Cemetery in Prague.

== Family ==
He had two sons from two wives. Miroslav is a librarian at the University of Hamburg. Waldemar was born in Florida, but has married and settled in Prague..
