= Hannah and Her Brothers =

2001 film by Vlado Adásek

Hannah and Her Brothers Hana a jej bratia
- Directed by: Vladimír Adásek
- Written by: Vladimír Adásek
- Produced by: Viera Sandtnerová; Oľga Hiadlovská
- Starring: Vladimír Adásek; Martin Keder; Marta Žuchová; Lucia Hurajová; Patrícia Jarjabková
- Cinematography: Juraj Chlpík
- Edited by: Alena Pätoprstá
- Music by: Ivan Čermák; Hana Hegerová
- Release date: December 2000
- Running time: 77 minutes
- Country: Slovakia
- Language: Slovak
- Budget: 2,000,000 Sk

Hannah and Her Brothers (Slovak: Hana a jej bratia), written and directed by Vladimír Adásek, is the first feature-length film from Slovakia to deal with homosexuality. The film premiered in December 2000 at the International Film Festival Bratislava and had its theatrical release in January 2001.

== Premise ==
In the local cabaret "Hannah and Her Brothers", Hana relates the story of the main character, Martin, and his journey of self-discovery through the songs of the Slovak chanteuse Hana Hegerová. The music and lyrics play an important role illustrating and commenting on the action.

== Cast ==
- Vladimír Adásek as Hana
- Martin Keder as Martin
- Lucia Hurajová as Hema
- Marta Žuchová as Theodora
- Patrícia Jarjabková || Viera, Martin's mother
- Rudolf Kratochvíl as Vlado
- Juraj Mojžiš as Duga
- Scarlett Čanakyová as Eva
- Csongor Kassai as Miloš
- Gabriela Dzuríková as Božka
- Danica Koršová as Irma
- Veronika Turoková as Evička
- Dušan Cinkota as Ondrej
- Karol Čálik as Kveta
- Peter Bebjak as Professor
- Natália Drabiščáková as Magda
- Ján Martinkovič as Štefan
- Nora Srncová as Mail carrier

== Awards ==
- 2000 International Film Festival Bratislava – Grand Prix Nomination (Vladimír Adásek)

== See also ==
- Hana Hegerová discography
