= Eva Pilarová =

Czech jazz and pop singer (1939–2020)

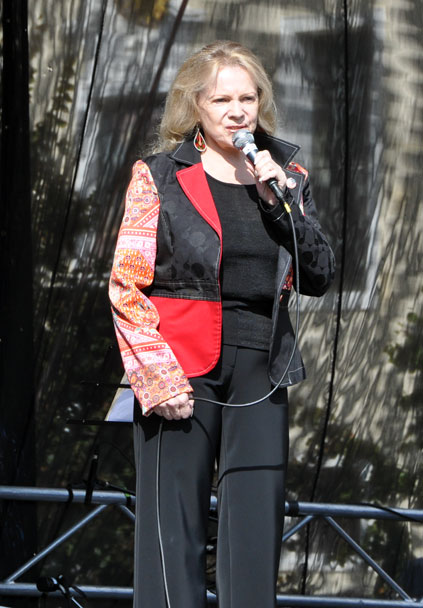

Background information
- Born: Eva Bojanovská; 9 August 1939; Brno, Protectorate of Bohemia and Moravia
- Died: 14 March 2020 (aged 80) Prague, Czech Republic
- Genres: Europop; Chanson
- Occupations: Singer; songwriter; musician
- Instruments: Vocals; guitar; percussion
- Years active: 1960–2020
- Website: evapilarova.cz

Eva Pilarová, née Bojanovská (9 August 1939 – 14 March 2020) was a Czech jazz and pop music singer.

== Biography ==
Pilarová was born in Brno. She started singing during her childhood, including classical music. She studied singing at the Janáček Academy of Arts in Brno. Her idols were Ella Fitzgerald and Louis Armstrong. In 1960, she became a member of the Semafor Theater in Prague where she sang alongside performers such as Jiří Suchý and Jiří Šlitr. In 1962 she left the theatre temporarily to sing in the Theater Rokoko, but in 1964 returned to Semafor. In the same year she also had a minor role in the film If a Thousand Clarinets (as a chorus-singer of the girl school). During her singing career she has had a large number of hits, including duets with Waldemar Matuška, Karel Gott and others.

After the Velvet revolution of 17 November 1989, she traveled several times to United States to sing mainly for Czech emigrants.

In 1977, to continue her career, she signed the Anti-charter organised against Charter 77. She justified it with her existential problems: after emigration of her first husband (a trumpeter Milan Pilar) and her second husband (singer Jaromír Mayer) she was afraid that she should not be allowed to sing in the media. She was active in her profession continuously until her death in Prague. She wrote two cookbooks. She was also an avid photographer, taking many photos especially of nature and cities. She had several photo exhibitions in the Czech Republic.

In addition to the fame she achieved in Czechoslovakia, i.e. the Czech Republic, Eva Pilarová was a singer of considerable international reputation in Europe. Thus, at the Split Festival in 1970, she sang the song My Captain (Kapetane moj) in alternation with Josipa Lisac.

== Last goodbye ==
The memorial mass for Eve Pilarová took place on Wednesday 3 June 2020 at the Basilica of the Assumption of the Virgin Mary in Prague, Strahov. Celebroval rev. Marian Pospěcha, performed a number of artists (Adam Plachetka, Pavel Šporcl, Monika Absolonová and others), state authorities represented by Minister of Culture Lubomír Zaorálek and acting village Jiřina Bohdalová. TV Noe prepared the live stream. Marian Pospěcha also appreciated in his homilia her song "There for Water in the Reeds" (is Paradise), sung with Waldemar Matuška. On behalf of the singers, he said goodbye in touching language (I love you!) Vojta Dyk.

== Respect ==
- The Czech writer Josef Škvorecký loved her voice and singing, he praised her repeatedly:
  - Without her art, something would be missing in the Czech culture.
  - If there was anybody, who could sing everything, it was Pilarka.

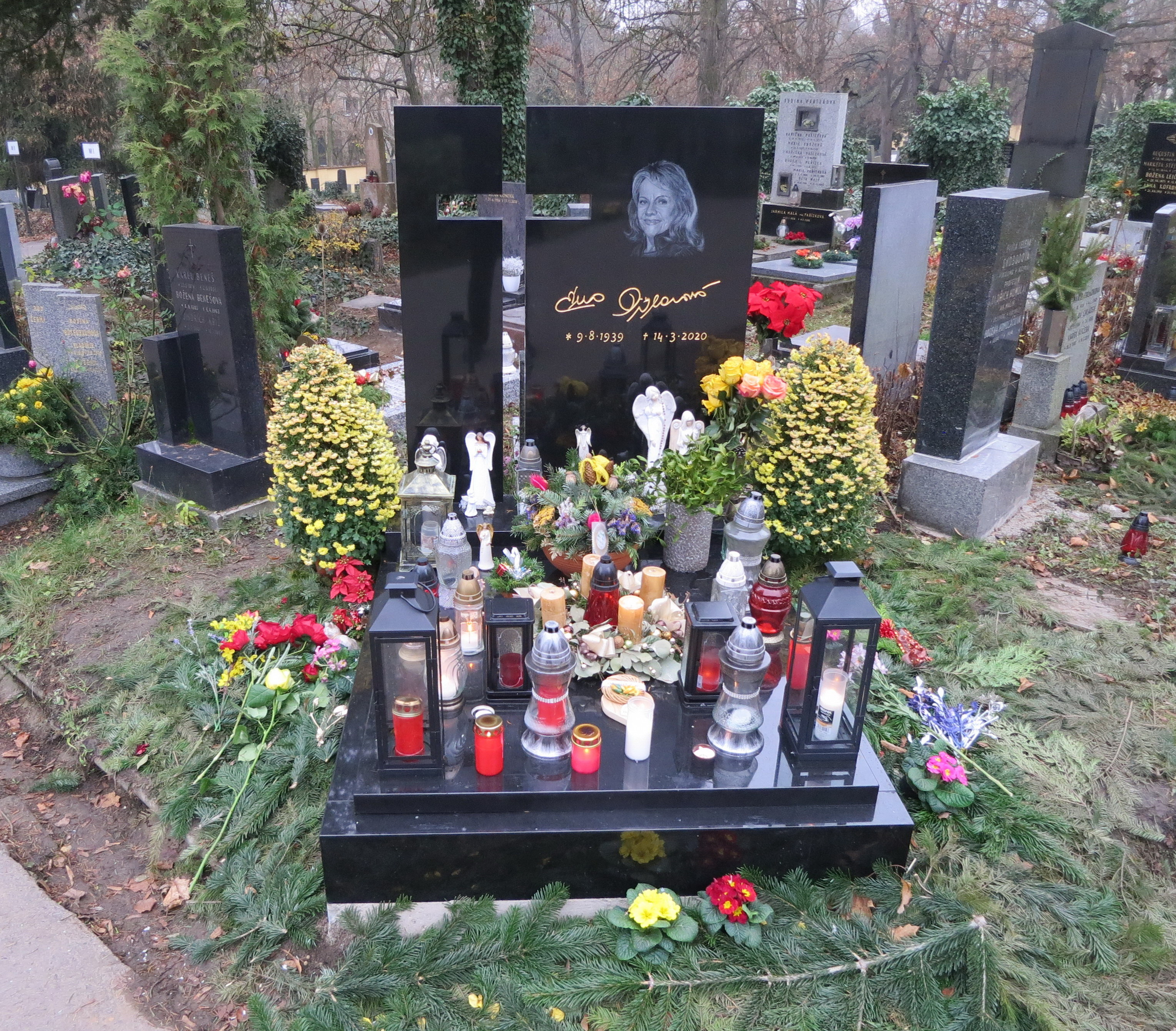
Grave of Eva Pilarová. Prague Malvazinky cemetery, near the grave of Karel Gott

== Awards ==
- She won the Golden Nightingale award of the Czechoslovakia four times (1963, 1964, 1967, 1971).
- In 1967, she won the International Intervision Song Contest in Bratislava.
- In 1967 she was awarded Grand Prix du Disque for her interpretation of "Requiem".
