= Naďa Urbánková =

Czech singer and actress (1939–2023)

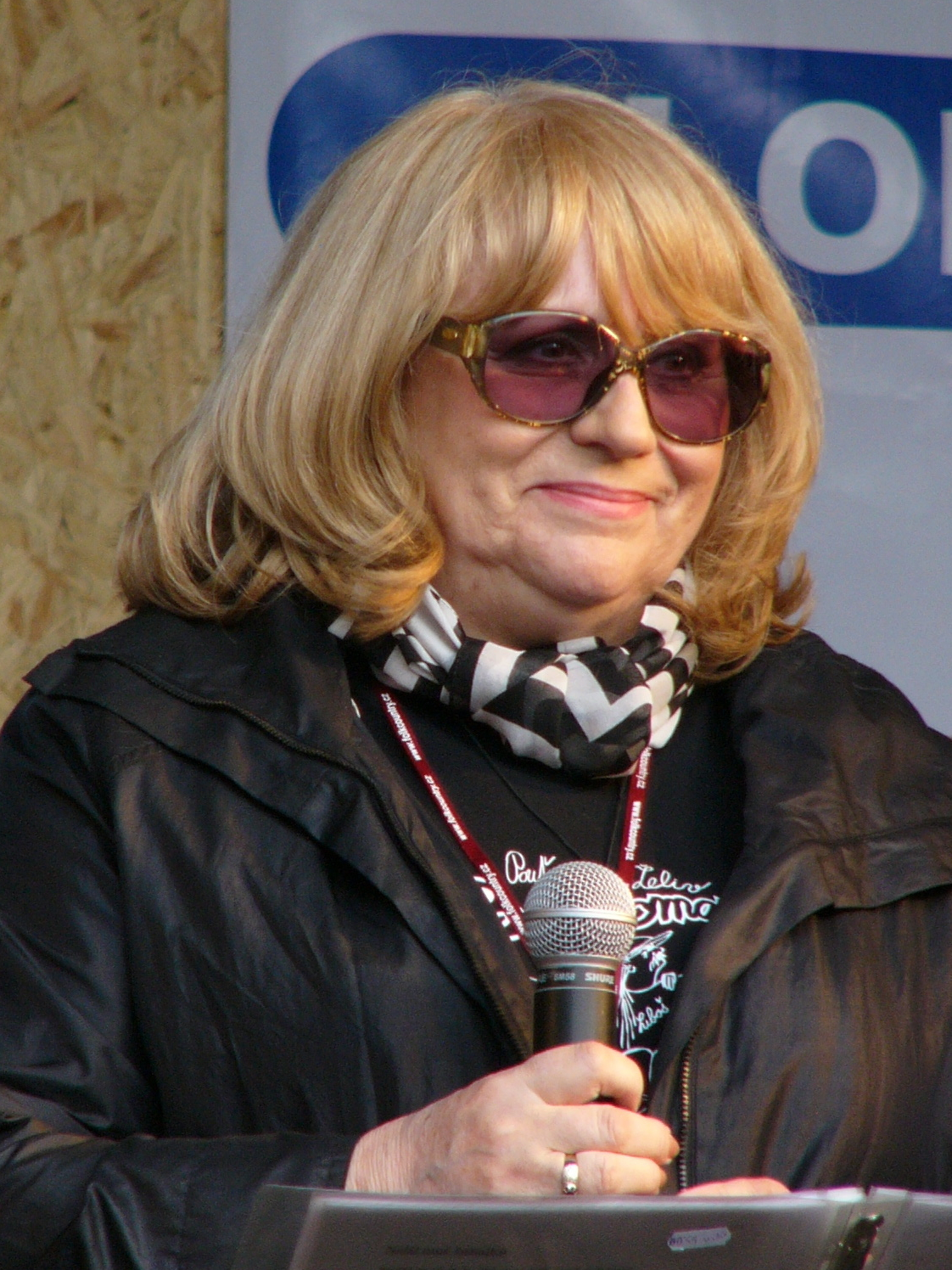
- Urbánková in 2008
- Born: Naděžda Balabánová; 30 June 1939; Nová Paka, Protectorate of Bohemia and Moravia
- Died: 3 February 2023 (aged 83); Prague, Czech Republic

Naďa Urbánková (born Naděžda Balabánová; 30 June 1939 – 3 February 2023) was a Czech singer and actress.

== Life and career ==
Born in Nová Paka, Urbánková grew up in Borovnička and graduated as a nurse at the Higher Medical School in Trutnov. After some experience in amateur dramatics, she made her professional stage debut in 1959 in the Pardubice Theatre. After marrying the actor Karel Urbánek she moved to Prague, where she worked at Magician's Lantern and was part of the CSSPT (the Czechoslovak State Ensemble of Songs and Dances).

Urbánková had her breakout in 1964, when she started a ten-years-run in the stage company of the Semafor theatre, and made her film debut in the successful musical If a Thousand Clarinets. In the 1960s and 1970s, she appeared in Closely Watched Trains, Larks on a String and Seclusion Near a Forest. As a singer, her major hits were "Závidím" (Czech cover of "Il ragazzo della via Gluck") and "Drahý můj" (Czech cover of "A Dear John Letter"), in duet with Jiří Grossmann. She was later part of the Jiří Brabec's Country Beat band. Starting from 1972, she won five Golden Nightingales in a row.

Urbánková died on 3 February 2023, from complications from cancer and COVID-19, at the age of 83.
