= Computer widow =

Person in a relationship with a digital media addict

A computer widow (or widower) is someone who has a relationship with a computer user who plays video games (on a console or on a computer), uses the Internet, or creates his/her own programs, paying far more attention to the computer or game than to his/her partner. It is similar in concept and may in some cases have replaced the football widow, which in the UK is often replaced by the "golf widow". The term was in use as early as 1983, with use of bulletin board systems and programming a concern.

The possible problems created in family life were being studied by psychologists, with couples coming to them for help. It was commented upon by Phillip Zimbardo as a possible problem which may develop as a result of children growing up around computers, who then may fail to have social skills in later life. He said that there was a risk that it would lead to greater separation between the sexes, because at the time, perhaps more so than today, computers were used by men more than women. However, some people find the Internet a way to meet a partner, such as via online dating sites.

Most gamer widows (partners of those addicted to games) may now be attached to players of massively multiplayer online role-playing games (MMORPGs). Because many of these games revolve around building or "leveling up" a player character, many hours are dedicated to this process while playing the game. Examples of MMORPGs include EverQuest, RuneScape, World of Warcraft, Guild Wars, Ultima Online, Final Fantasy XI, City of Heroes, and Ragnarok Online. Other games such as Counter-Strike, the games of the Call of Duty series that have online multiplayer options, StarCraft, Factorio and Civilization III or IV, often known for their addictive qualities, also result in their fair share of gamer widows.

Some support groups for computer widows exist in real life. Internet support groups exist for addicted players of the popular MMORPGs, EverQuest and World of Warcraft, with some gamers speaking in the media of their need for such a group. There are also Internet support groups for World of Warcraft widows. A website was launched in mid-2005, dedicated to the support of gamer widow(er)s of a variety of different games, including World of Warcraft and EverQuest. It was the first site of its kind that provided support forums for gamer widow(er)s and has gained international recognition after the founder, Sherry Myrow, was interviewed by MSNBC FoxBusiness and by Maclean's. Merchandise can even be purchased on the Internet with slogans admitting that a person is a widow to some of these computer activities.

== See also ==
- Game addiction
- Internet addiction
