= Karel Duba =

Czech musician (1923–1968)

- Born: 29 September 1923; Písek, Czechoslovakia
- Died: 21 August 1968 (aged 44); Ulaanbaatar, Mongolia
- Genres: Jazz; pop; rock; country
- Occupation: Musician
- Instrument: Guitar
- Labels: Supraphon

Karel Duba (29 September 1923 – 21 August 1968) was a Czech guitarist, composer, and bandleader. He was one of the first musicians to play electric guitar in Czechoslovakia. During his career, he collaborated with important exponents of Czech jazz and pop music. He died on a concert tour in Mongolia.

== Biography ==
During the German occupation of Czechoslovakia, Duba began to appear onstage as a guitarist with dance orchestras. Following liberation, he performed as a member of various ensembles, including the Film Symphonic Orchestra (FISYO). At the beginning of the 1960s, Duba formed his own professional band. The ensemble used elements of jazz, rock, and country in their compositions. Karel Duba Ensemble was also the first Czech music group experimenting with electric guitars. A member of the ensemble and later successful songwriter and bandleader, bass guitarist Karel Vágner, even called Duba the "first Czech who played electric guitar".

In the 1960s, Duba's band accompanied popular Czech singers, such as Josef Laufer, Karel Gott, Yvonne Přenosilová, Karel Hála, Hana Hegerová, and Josef Zíma. They also recorded vinyl records for major Czechoslovak label Supraphon and performed concert tours both in Czechoslovakia and abroad.

On 19 August 1968, the Karel Duba Ensemble, accompanied by other musicians, travelled to Mongolia. On 21 August, the group decided to visit Zaisan Memorial in the capital, Ulaanbaatar. They went by bus, and according to the testimony of František Živný, a founding member of the band, the chauffeur had considerable problems driving. According to this report, the brakes of the bus failed in the upper part of a hill, and it began to roll back to the left shoulder of the road, finally falling off the cliff. Six members of the expedition, including bandleader Karel Duba, were later found dead.
