= Borovnička =

- Municipality
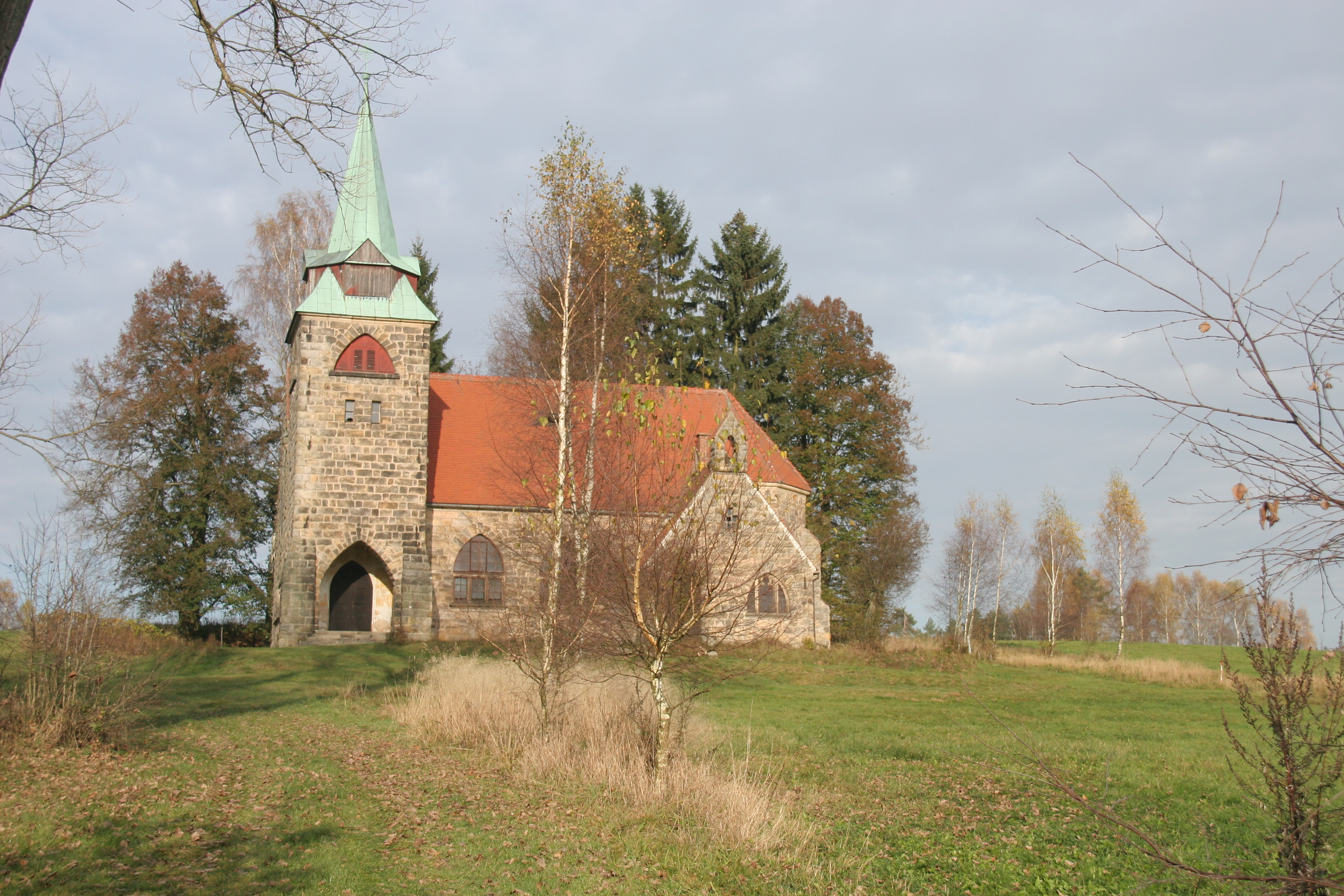
- Church of the Sacred Heart

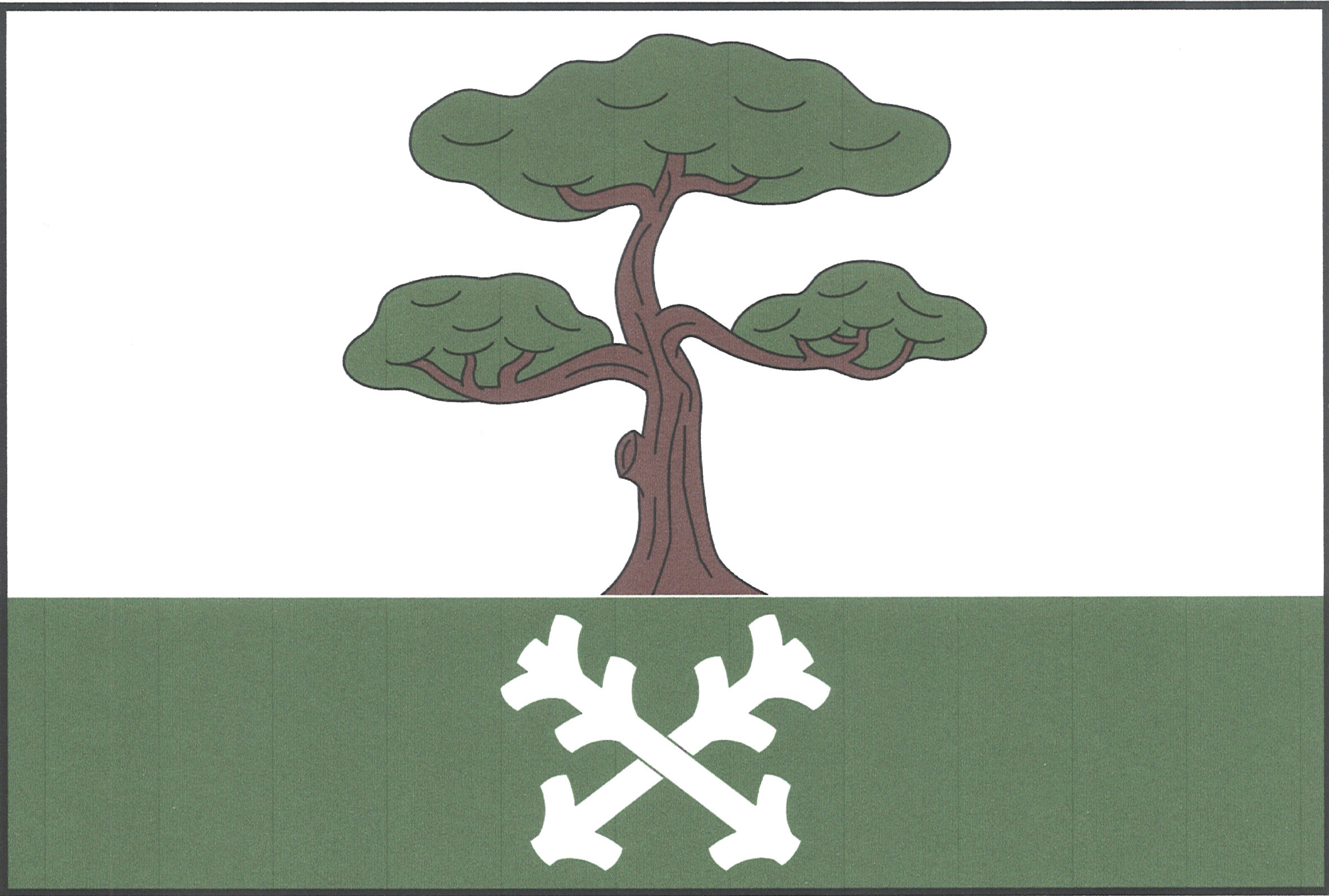
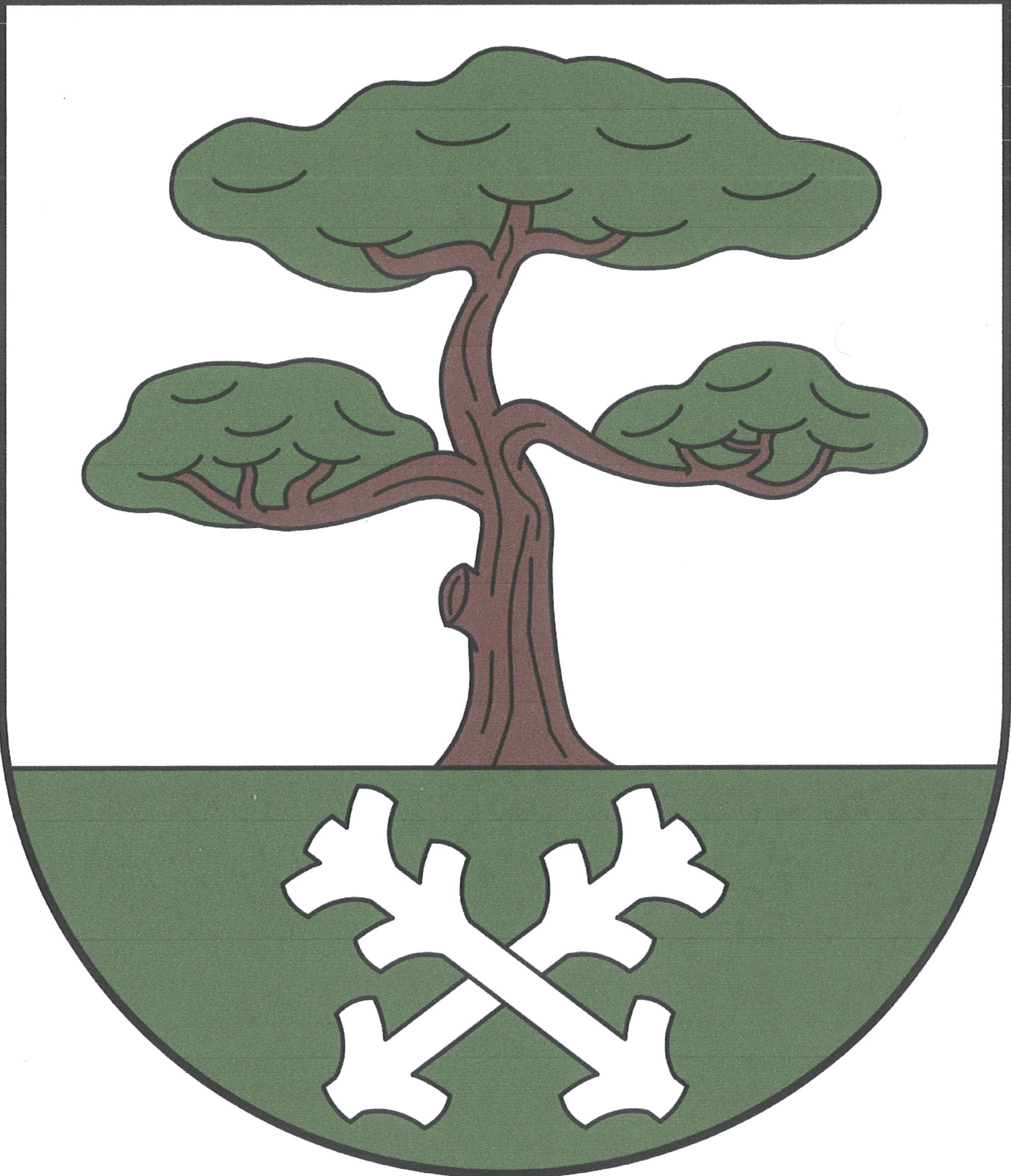
- Flag Coat of arms

- Location in the Czech Republic
- Coordinates: 50°30′3″N 15°40′2″E
- Country: Czech Republic
- Region: Hradec Králové
- District: Trutnov
- First mentioned: 1423

Area
  - Total: 5.79 km^{2} (2.24 sq mi)
- Elevation: 464 m (1,522 ft)

Population (2026-01-01)
  - Total: 231
  - Density: 39.9/km^{2} (103/sq mi)
- Time zone: UTC+1 (CET)
  - Summer (DST): UTC+2 (CEST)
- Postal code: 544 75
- Website: www.borovnicka.eu

Borovnička (German: Klein Borowitz) is a municipality and village in Trutnov District in the Hradec Králové Region of the Czech Republic. It has about 200 inhabitants.

== Demographics ==
Historical population
Year	Pop.	±%
1869	1,184	—
1880	1,159	−2.1%
1890	1,114	−3.9%
1900	1,065	−4.4%
1910	1,029	−3.4%
1921	861	−16.3%
1930	853	−0.9%
1950	528	−38.1%
1961	418	−20.8%
1970	339	−18.9%
1980	315	−7.1%
1991	224	−28.9%
2001	203	−9.4%
2011	178	−12.3%
2021	183	+2.8%
Source: Censuses

== Notable people ==
- Naďa Urbánková (1939–2023), singer and actress; grew up here
