= Zlatý slavík =

Czechoslovak music award

- Awarded for: Popularity in the Czechoslovak music industry
- Country: Czechoslovakia
- First award: 1962
- Final award: 1991
- Website: Official website

Zlatý slavík (English: "golden nightingale") was a Czechoslovak music poll and award of the same name established by the magazine Mladý svět in 1962, and broadcast on television. It was held until 1991, when Český slavík took its place. After the dissolution of Czechoslovakia at the end of 1992 and its division into Czechia and Slovakia, the latter got its own award, named Slovenský slávik. Karel Gott was both the first and most highly decorated recipient of Zlatý slavík.

== History ==
In 1962, as the popular Czechoslovak magazine Mladý svět was generating ideas for a music poll, one of its young editors, later actor and director Ladislav Smoljak, came up with the name "golden nightingale", after a children's toy.

In the first year of the poll, 797 votes were returned; the highest vote tally registered in its 29-year history was over 115,000. From 1969 until the collapse of communism in Czechoslovakia in 1989, the poll's results were falsified for political reasons.

== Categories and censorship ==
Award categories changed over the years. In 1962, 1963, and 1970, there was a joint male and female singer category; the song category was eliminated after 1968.

In 1970, Marta Kubišová was set to win her fourth slavík, but since she had been banned from speaking publicly by the government due to her anti-communist lyrics and activism, the editors of Mladý svět were forced to change the results at the behest of the Czech Office for Press and Information: the male and female singer categories were thus combined, leading to a victory by Karel Gott. Kubišová received her award retroactively in 1990 by then-editor-in-chief of Mladý svět, Luboš Beniak.

== Winners ==
Over the course of its 29 years, 6 male and 7 female singers, 8 bands, and 7 songs received the award.

Top winners

Karel Gott (22), Hana Zagorová (9), Naďa Urbánková (5), Marta Kubišová (4), and the band Elán (4) won the most trophies.

Rank	1st	2nd	3rd
Artist	Karel Gott	Hana Zagorová	Naďa Urbánková
Total awards	22	9	5

Table

Year	Male singer	Female singer	Group	Singer – male/female	Song	Presenter
1962	–	–	–	Waldemar Matuška	"Láska nebeská" (Jiří Šlitr/Jiří Suchý)	
1963	–	–	–	Karel Gott	"Oči sněhem zaváté" (Šlitr/Suchý)	Vladimír Dvořák
1964	Karel Gott	Eva Pilarová	–	–	"Schody do nebe" (Karel Kopecký/Jindřich Faktor)	
1965	Karel Gott	Helena Vondráčková	–	–	"Cesta rájem" (Artie Glenn/Jiří Štaidl)	
1966	Karel Gott	Marta Kubišová	–	–		Darek Vostřel
1967	Waldemar Matuška	Eva Pilarová	–	–	"Náhrobní kámen" (Petr Novák/Ivo Plicka)	
1968	Karel Gott	Marta Kubišová	–	–	"Lady Carneval" (Karel Svoboda/Štaidl)	Vladimír Dvořák
1969	Karel Gott	Marta Kubišová				
1970				Karel Gott		Eduard Hrubeš
1971	Karel Gott	Eva Pilarová				Eduard Hrubeš
1972	Karel Gott	Naďa Urbánková				Miloslav Šimek
1973	Karel Gott	Naďa Urbánková				Miloslav Šimek
1974	Karel Gott	Naďa Urbánková				
1975	Karel Gott	Naďa Urbánková				
1976	Karel Gott	Naďa Urbánková				
1977	Karel Gott	Hana Zagorová	Skupina Ladislava Štaidla			
1978	Karel Gott	Hana Zagorová	Skupina Ladislava Štaidla			
1979	Karel Gott	Hana Zagorová	Katapult			Jan Vala
1980	Karel Gott	Hana Zagorová	Katapult			
1981	Karel Gott	Hana Zagorová	Olympic			Tomáš Sláma
1982	Miroslav Žbirka	Hana Zagorová	Olympic			Tomáš Sláma
1983	Karel Gott	Hana Zagorová	Olympic			Jan Vala
1984	Karel Gott	Hana Zagorová	Elán			
1985	Peter Nagy	Hana Zagorová	Elán			
1986	Dalibor Janda	Iveta Bartošová	Elán			
1987	Dalibor Janda	Petra Janů	Elán			
1988	Dalibor Janda	Petra Janů	Citron			
1989	Karel Gott	Petra Janů	Team			Jan Vala, Roman Lipčík
1990	Karel Gott	Iveta Bartošová	Team			Jan Vala
1991	Pavol Habera	Iveta Bartošová	Team			

== Successors ==
Succeeded by
Český slavík, Czechia (1996–present)
Slávik, Slovakia (1998–2012)
