= Dalibor Janda =

Czech musician (born 1953)

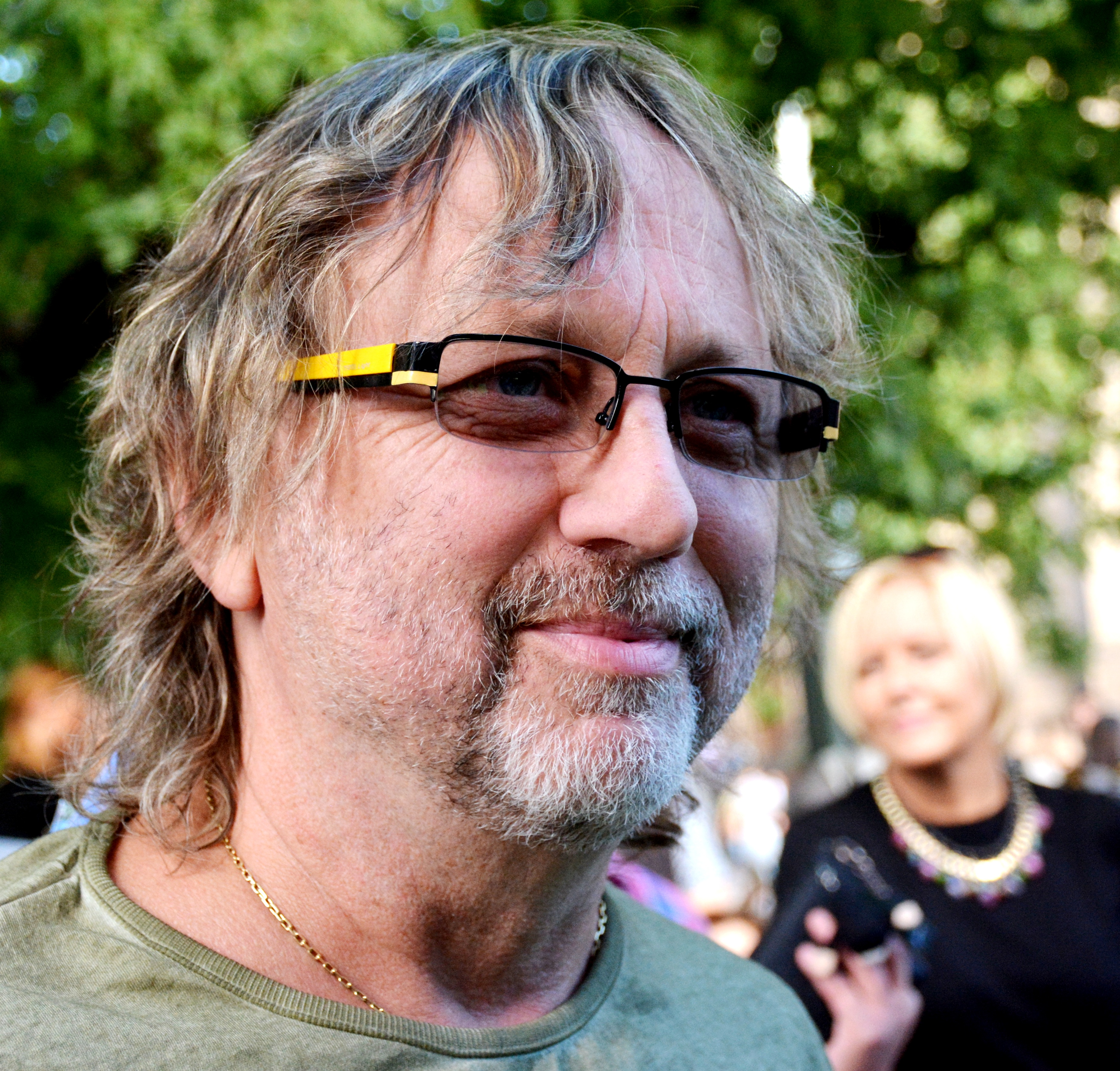
- Janda in 2015

Background information
- Born: Václav Janda; 21 March 1953 (age 73); Hranice, Czechoslovakia
- Genres: Rock; pop
- Occupation: Musician
- Instrument: Vocals
- Years active: 1985–present
- Website: daliborjanda.cz

Dalibor Janda (born 21 March 1953) is a Czech pop and rock singer, lyricist, and composer, whose popularity peaked in the 1980s. Between 1986 and 1988, he won the Zlatý slavík award three years in a row.

== Career ==
Dalibor Janda, born Václav Janda in Hranice, in what was then Czechoslovakia, appeared on the music scene in the late 1970s and his popularity grew quickly. He began performing under the name Dalibor Janda in the 1980s and eventually had his name officially changed.

== Personal life ==
Janda is married and has two children. His daughter, Jiřina Jandová, is also a singer. His son, Dalibor Janda Jr., committed suicide in 2003. In January 2021, Janda had a heart attack and was hospitalized.

== Discography ==
Studio albums

- Hurikán Dalibor Janda & Prototyp (1986)
- Kde jsi Dalibor Janda & Prototyp (1987)
- 10 prstů pro život (1988)
- Take them to Mars (1989)
- Jen ty samotná a já (1990)
- Povídání s písničkami (1991)
- Co se má stát, to se stane (1992)
- V lásce nejsou mapy (1994)
- Harmonie zvěrokruhu (1995)
- Krásně šílená (1996)
- Ty jsi můj benzín (2000)
- Roky jako motýli (2003)
- Jeden den (2006)
- Páté poschodí (2007)
- Já se přiznám (2011)
- Někde v zemi nad zemí (2016)

Live albums

- Páté poschodí/Dalibor Janda v Lucerně (2007)
- Dalibor Janda 55 – Prototyp a hosté – Lucerna 2008 (2009)

Compilations

- Zlatý výběr (1993)
- 18 hitů o lásce (1998)
- Hurikán koktejl (2001)
- Hvězdné duety (2009)
- Velký flám (2018)

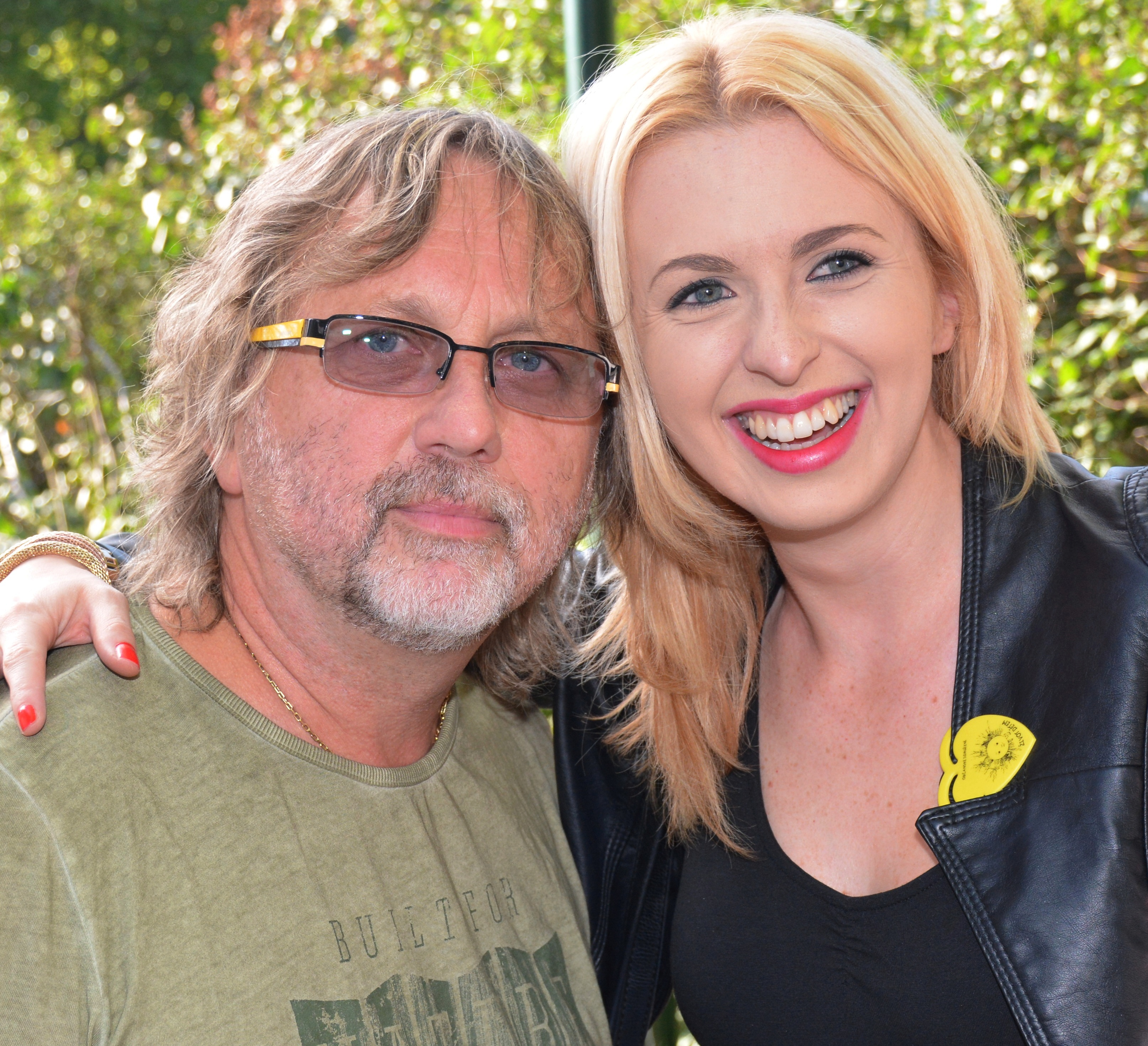
Dalibor Janda with daughter Jiřina, 2015
