= Petr Macháček =

Czech ice hockey player

- Born: October 19, 1985 (age 40) Jindřichův Hradec, Czechoslovakia
- Height: 5 ft 10 in (178 cm)
- Weight: 185 lb (84 kg; 13 st 3 lb)
- Position: Defence
- Shot: Left
- Played for: HC České Budějovice; KLH Vajgar Jindřichův Hradec; KooKoo; HC Tábor; SK Horácká Slavia Třebíč; BK Mladá Boleslav; HC Slovan Ústečtí Lvi; Piráti Chomutov; SK Kadaň; HC Banska Bystrica; Salzgitter Icefighters; David Servis Ceske Budejovice; TJ Hluboká nad Vltavou Knights; HC Samson České Budějovice
- Playing career: 2004–2022

Petr Macháček (born October 19, 1985) is a Czech professional ice hockey defenceman currently playing for Piráti Chomutov in the Czech Extraliga.

== Career statistics ==
			Regular season					Playoffs
Season	Team	League	GP	G	A	Pts	PIM	GP	G	A	Pts	PIM
1999–00	HC České Budějovice U18	Czech U18	1	0	0	0	0	—	—	—	—	—
2000–01	HC České Budějovice U18	Czech U18	46	3	5	8	20	—	—	—	—	—
2001–02	HC České Budějovice U18	Czech U18	11	2	2	4	12	—	—	—	—	—
2001–02	HC České Budějovice U20	Czech U20	33	2	5	7	34	4	0	0	0	0
2002–03	HC České Budějovice U20	Czech U20	46	4	3	7	50	—	—	—	—	—
2003–04	HC České Budějovice U20	Czech U20	52	4	11	15	109	—	—	—	—	—
2003–04	HC České Budějovice	Czech	1	0	0	0	2	—	—	—	—	—
2003–04	KLH Vajgar Jindřichův Hradec	Czech3	6	0	0	0	2	—	—	—	—	—
2004–05	HC České Budějovice U20	Czech U20	23	5	10	15	64	—	—	—	—	—
2004–05	HC České Budějovice	Czech2	18	0	1	1	6	—	—	—	—	—
2004–05	KLH Jindrichuv Hradec	Czech3	3	0	0	0	0	12	0	1	1	14
2005–06	KooKoo	Mestis	27	2	4	6	38	—	—	—	—	—
2005–06	HC České Budějovice U20	Czech U20	9	1	4	5	48	6	1	0	1	10
2005–06	HC České Budějovice	Czech	2	0	0	0	0	—	—	—	—	—
2005–06	HC Tábor	Czech3	—	—	—	—	—	3	0	0	0	0
2006–07	HC Mountfield	Czech	29	0	1	1	12	—	—	—	—	—
2006–07	SK Horácká Slavia Třebíč	Czech2	9	0	3	3	18	2	0	0	0	0
2007–08	HC Mountfield	Czech	7	0	0	0	4	1	0	0	0	0
2007–08	BK Mladá Boleslav	Czech2	39	3	8	11	40	12	1	4	5	10
2008–09	HC Mountfield	Czech	2	0	0	0	0	—	—	—	—	—
2008–09	HC Slovan Ústečtí Lvi	Czech2	27	2	5	7	22	16	1	6	7	12
2009–10	HC Mountfield	Czech	24	1	2	3	8	3	0	0	0	2
2009–10	HC Tábor	Czech2	1	0	0	0	12	—	—	—	—	—
2010–11	BK Mladá Boleslav	Czech	48	0	2	2	56	—	—	—	—	—
2011–12	Piráti Chomutov	Czech2	29	1	5	6	14	17	1	2	3	20
2012–13	Piráti Chomutov	Czech	29	0	7	7	20	—	—	—	—	—
2012–13	SK Kadaň	Czech2	27	1	10	11	20	—	—	—	—	—
2013–14	HC Banska Bystrica	Slovak	47	1	14	15	61	11	0	5	5	12
2014–15	Salgitter Icefighters	Germany4	3	1	7	8	14	4	2	5	7	6
2015–16	David Servis Ceske Budejovice	Czech4	6	1	6	7	—	—	—	—	—	—
2016–17	TJ Hluboká nad Vltavou Knights	Czech4	1	0	0	0	—	—	—	—	—	—
2017–18	David Servis Ceske Budejovice	Czech3	27	5	9	14	62	3	0	1	1	2
2018–19	David Servis Ceske Budejovice	Czech3	5	0	1	1	22	—	—	—	—	—
2020–21	HC Samson České Budějovice	Czech4	2	1	2	3	59	—	—	—	—	—
2021–22	HC Samson České Budějovice	Czech4	1	0	0	0	0	—	—	—	—	—
Czech totals			142	1	12	13	102	4	0	0	0	4
Czech2 totals			150	7	32	39	132	47	3	12	15	42
Czech3 totals			41	5	10	15	86	18	0	2	2	16
