= Tis u Blatna =

- Municipality
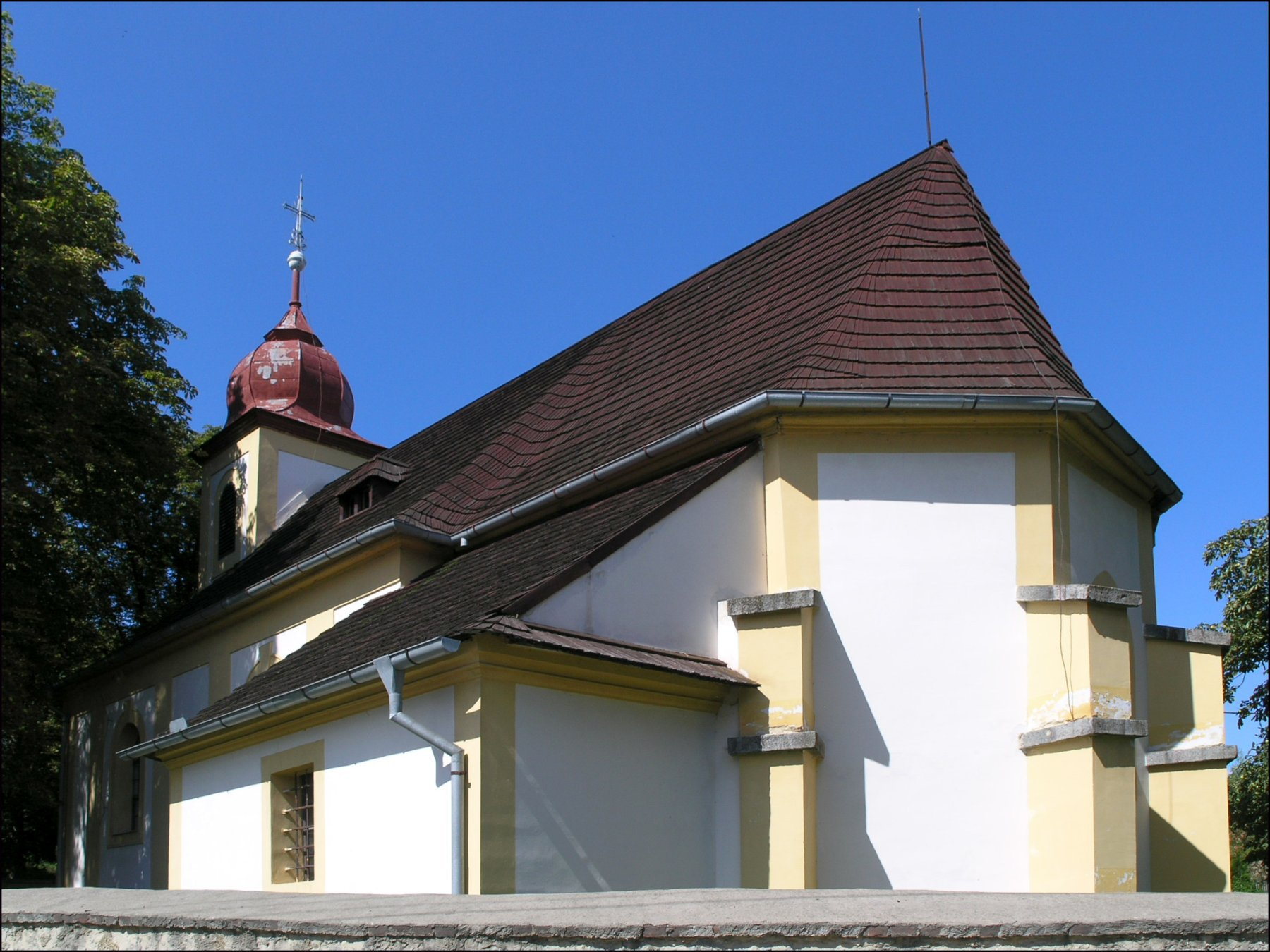
- Church of the Exaltation of the Holy Cross

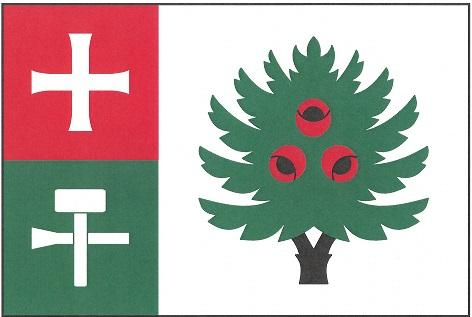
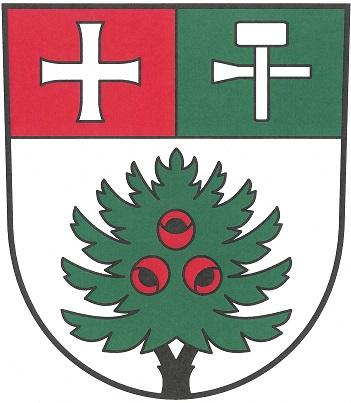
- Flag Coat of arms

- Location in the Czech Republic
- Coordinates: 50°5′9″N 13°20′52″E
- Country: Czech Republic
- Region: Plzeň
- District: Plzeň-North
- First mentioned: 1227

Area
  - Total: 14.36 km^{2} (5.54 sq mi)
- Elevation: 605 m (1,985 ft)

Population (2026-01-01)
  - Total: 117
  - Density: 8.15/km^{2} (21.1/sq mi)
- Time zone: UTC+1 (CET)
  - Summer (DST): UTC+2 (CEST)
- Postal code: 331 65
- Website: www.obec-tis.cz

Tis u Blatna (German: Tiss bei Pladen) is a municipality and village in Plzeň-North District in the Plzeň Region of the Czech Republic. It has about 100 inhabitants.

Tis u Blatna lies approximately 38 kilometres (24 mi) north of Plzeň and 77 km (48 mi) west of Prague.

== Administrative division ==
Tis u Blatna consists of three municipal parts (in brackets population according to the 2021 census):

- Tis u Blatna (89)
- Balková (2)
- Kračín (19)

== Demographics ==
Historical population
Year	Pop.	±%
1869	636	—
1880	724	+13.8%
1890	701	−3.2%
1900	663	−5.4%
1910	716	+8.0%
1921	494	−31.0%
1930	694	+40.5%
1950	197	−71.6%
1961	198	+0.5%
1970	201	+1.5%
1980	125	−37.8%
1991	106	−15.2%
2001	103	−2.8%
2011	89	−13.6%
2021	110	+23.6%
Source: Censuses
