= If a Thousand Clarinets =

- Directed by: Ján Roháč and Vladimír Svitáček
- Written by: Ján Roháč
- Music by: Jiří Šlitr
- Release date: January 29, 1965
- Running time: 131 minutes
- Country: Czechoslovakia
- Language: Czech

If a Thousand Clarinets (Czech: Kdyby tisíc klarinetů) is a 1965 Czechoslovak musical directed by Ján Roháč and Vladimír Svitáček. The film was a success especially among younger audience, but raised some controversies because of its anti-war message.
