= Jiří Šlitr =

Czech songwriter, musician, actor and painter (1924–1969)

- Šlitr in the 1960s

Background information
- Born: 15 February 1924
- Origin: Zálesní Lhota, Czechoslovakia
- Died: 26 December 1969 (aged 45)
- Genres: Jazz
- Occupations: Pianist, composer, singer, actor
- Instrument: piano

Jiří Šlitr (15 February 1924 – 26 December 1969) was a Czech songwriter, pianist, singer, actor and painter. Together with Jiří Suchý he significantly influenced Czech pop music and theatre in the 1960s.

== Biography ==
Jiří Šlitr was born on 15 February 1924 in Zálesní Lhota, Czechoslovakia. He went to gymnasium in Jilemnice, then in Rychnov nad Kněžnou. He graduated in 1943 and worked as a clerk in Bělá pod Bezdězem until the end of World War II. He then studied law at Charles University in Prague and in 1949 received a doctorate in law (academic degree JUDr. – he never practiced as a lawyer, but was later nicknamed Doctor Piano). In 1948 he founded the Czechoslovak Dixieland Jazz Band with former classmates from Rychnov. He occasionally played with Akord Club, and toured with the Miroslav Horníček theatre ensemble as pianist. In 1957 Horníček introduced him to Jiří Suchý, and the Suchý + Šlitr duo began to perform in the Reduta theatre and Vltava café. Next year was the Brussels Expo 58: Šlitr was there as part of the Laterna Magika theatre. In 1959 he began to perform in the newly founded Semafor theatre, which became his principal venue.

Jiří Šlitr, with lyricist-playwright Jiří Suchý and clarinetist Ferdinand Havlík, was a key exponent of the "golden era" of the Semafor Theatre. His first work with Jiří Suchý was Píseň o Hamletovi (Song about Hamlet). Člověk z půdy (Man from Attic) — their first play for the Semafor, with music by Šlitr – was a remarkable success. The 1962 play Jonáš a tingl tangl (Jonáš and Tingl Tangl) featured Šlitr in his first acting role; he and Suchý became a well-known acting duo. In 1964 Šlitr won the 6th place in the Czechoslovak singer contest Zlatý slavík (The Golden Nightingale).

The double-act of Šlitr and Suchý made film appearances, firstly in Bylo nás deset (There Were Ten Of Us, 1963) and later in the successful musical comedy Kdyby 1000 klarinetů (If a Thousand Clarinets, 1964). In 1965 Šlitr composed the jazz opera Dobře placená procházka (A Walk Worthwhile), which was staged in 2007 by the Czech-American director Miloš Forman at the National Theatre in Prague. Šlitr's attempt to stage A Walk Worthwhile on Broadway was unsuccessful.

Šlitr wanted to play and compose in a modern "rock" style at the Semafor but Havlík disagreed. In 1966 Šlitr fired the Ferdinand Havlík Orchestra, but in the end he wound down his own involvement with the Semafor and with Suchý. The duo parted company for a short time, and Šlitr put on a new play Ďábel z Vinohrad (The Devil from Vinohrady). Meanwhile, he exhibited his drawings in Wiesbaden, Dortmund, and New York City. In 1967 he attended Expo 67 in Montreal, where he presented the show "Stars of Prague", and during his stay in America he exhibited drawings in Hollywood and Houston. In 1968 he reunited with Suchý and after the events of the Prague Spring he restaged his earlier work The Devil from Vinohrady as a pointed response to the Soviet invasion of Czechoslovakia. Šlitr and Suchý also signed the anti-communist 2000 Words manifesto by Ludvík Vaculík. In 1968, Šlitr appeared in his last film, Zločin v šantánu (Crime in the Night Club).

Šlitr died on 26 December 1969, under circumstances that have never been fully explained. He was last seen going to his atelier in Prague. Several hours later, members of his family found his car outside the building. Inside the atelier they found the bodies of Šlitr and his young girlfriend, who were later found to have died of coal gas poisoning. Public speculations of suicide were unproven.

== Selected songs ==
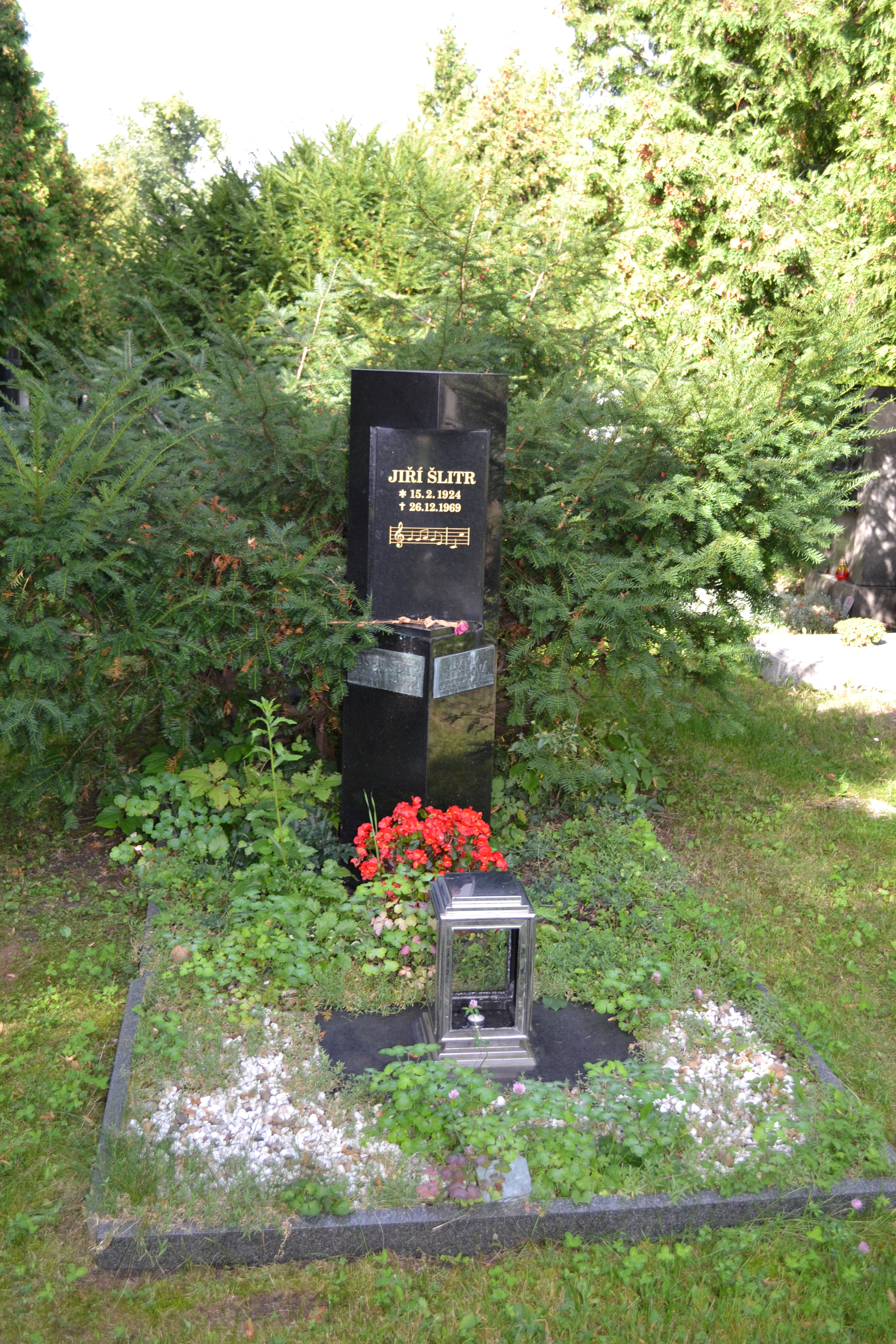
Grave of Jiří Šlitr at Vinohrady Cemetery in Prague

- Babetta
- Bíle mě matička oblékala
- Co jsem měl dnes k obědu
- Honky tonky blues
- Jó, to jsem ještě žil
- Kapitáne, kam s tou lodí
- Láska se nevyhne králi
- Klokočí
- Kočka na okně
- Krajina posedlá tmou
- Léta dozrávaní
- Malé kotě
- Plná hrst
- Proč se lidi nemaj rádi
- Spodek, filek, král a eso – twist
- Tak abyste to věděla
- Včera neděle byla

== Bibliography ==
- Fikejz, Miloš (2008). Český film. Herci a herečky. III. (S-Ž) (in Czech). Prague: Libri. pp. 361–363. ISBN 978-80-7277-353-4.
- Rohál, Robert (2006). Kdo by je neznal. Nezapomenutelné dvojice z jeviště, plátna a obrazovky (in Czech). Prague: XYZ. pp. 16–20. ISBN 80-86864-57-X.
- Levy, Alan (1972). Rowboat to Prague. New York: Grossman Publishers. ISBN 0-670-60920-X.
