= Semafor (theatre) =

Theatre in Prague, Czech Republic

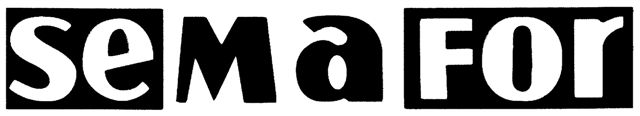

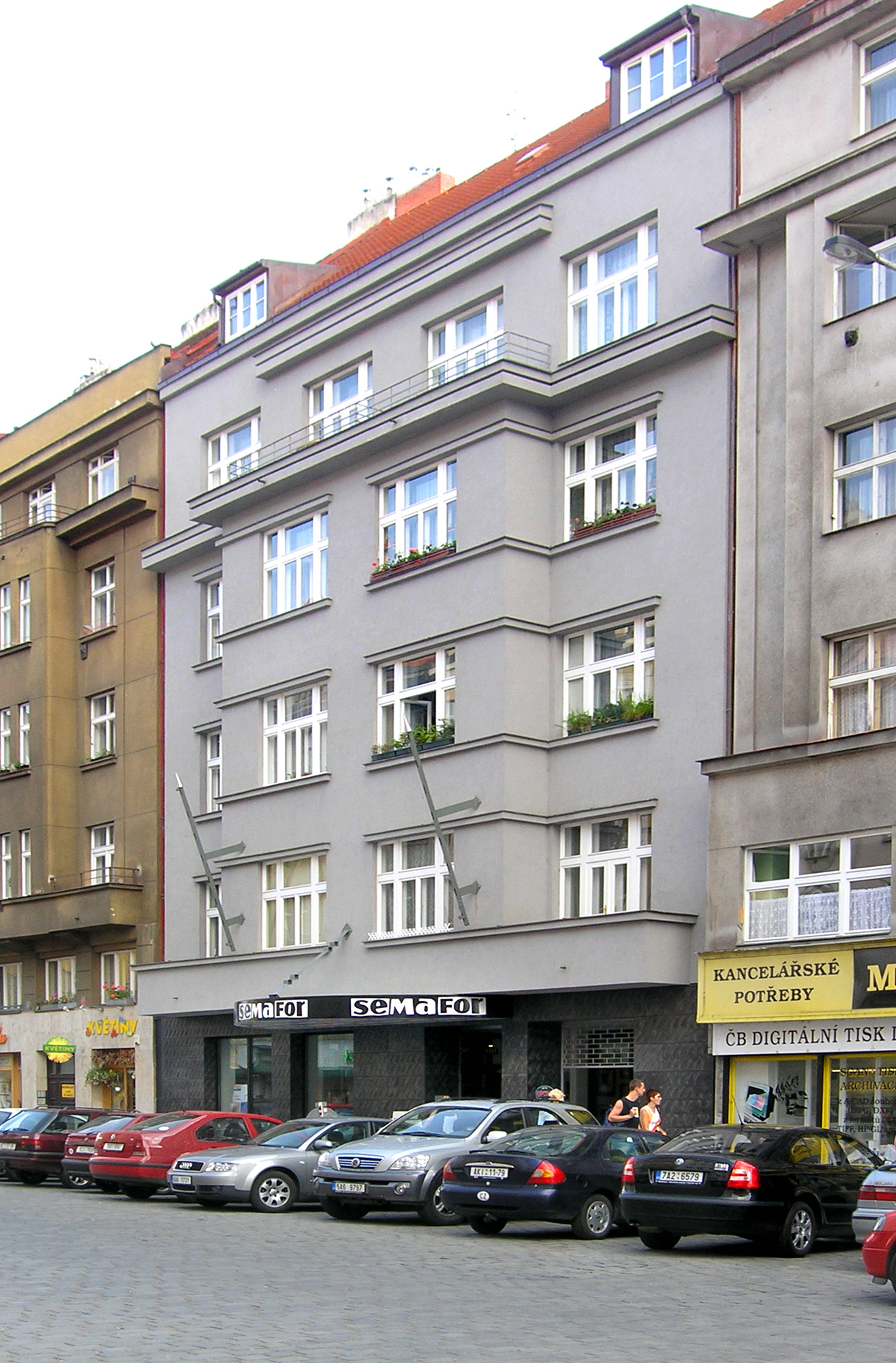
- Front view
- Interactive map of Semafor
- Address: Dejvická 688, 160 00; Prague 6-Dejvice; Czech Republic
- Coordinates: 50°5′57″N 14°23′51.41″E
- Type: Theatre

Construction
- Opened: 1959

Website
- semafor.cz

Semafor is a theatre in Prague, Czech Republic, established by Jiří Suchý and Ferdinand Havlík in 1959. Suchý has performed there for many decades and is the current owner. The theatre was a starting point for many famous Czech musicians, including Karel Gott and Hana Hegerová.

The name "Semafor" is an acronym for Sedm Malých Forem ("seven small forms"), referring to genres of the theatre—musical comedy, poetry theatre, song history, jazz, fine arts, film, and free genre.
