= Jiří Suchý =

Czech actor and writer (born 1931)

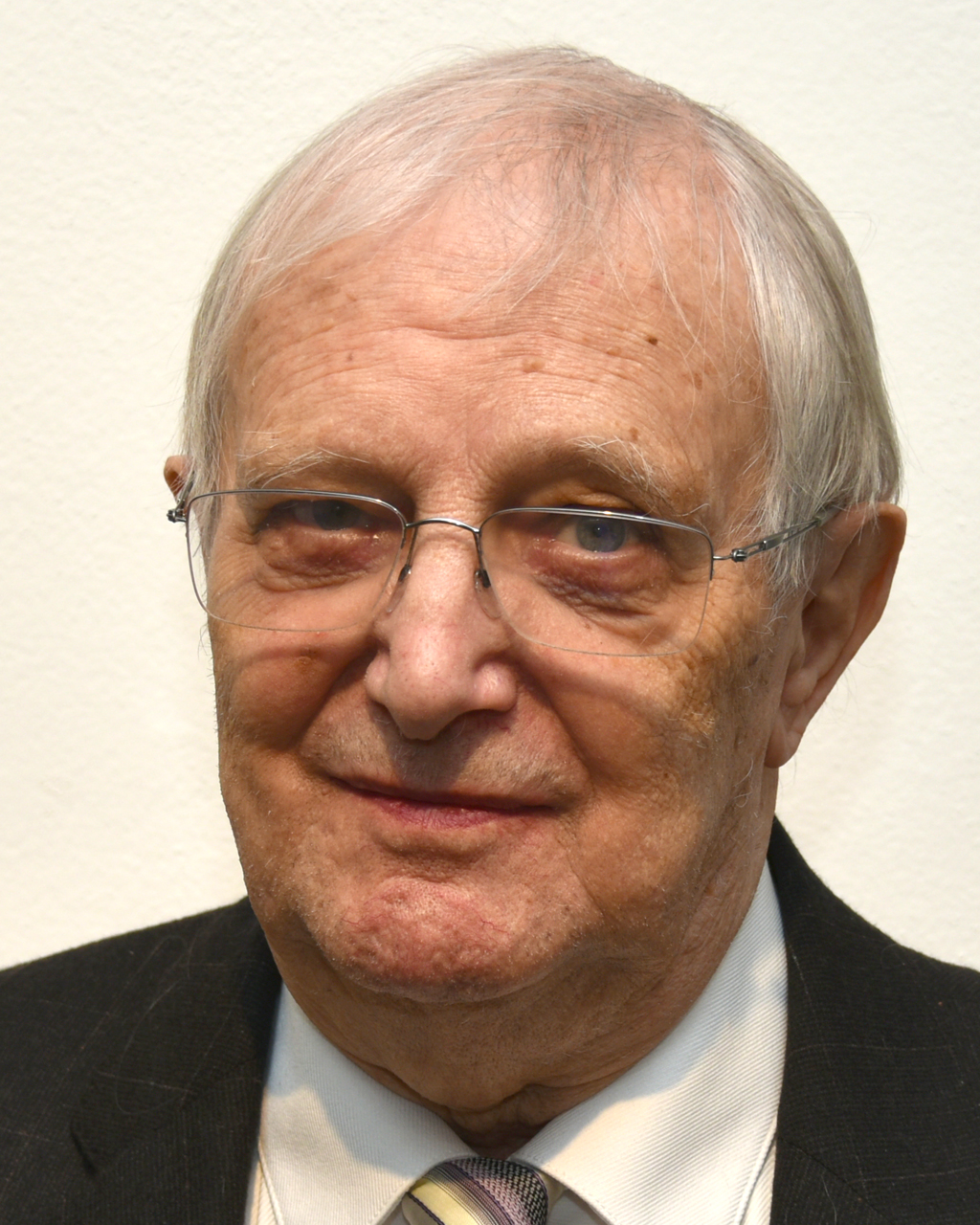
- Jiří Suchý (2019)
- Born: 1 October 1931 (age 94); Plzeň, Czechoslovakia
- Occupations: actor, writer, poet, lyricist, composer, artist

Jiří Suchý (born 1 October 1931) is a Czech comedian, poet, lyricist, prolific songwriter and occasional film-maker and prose writer. Plenty of his songs have become extremely popular within several successive generations. Currently he is the owner of the theatre Semafor in Prague where he has performed for several decades and which he helped to establish in 1959. He used to write and perform within an artistic couple with Jiří Šlitr, together they wrote the jazz opera A Walk Worthwhile. After the death of Šlitr in December 1969, Suchy formed a new duo with the actress Jitka Molavcová.

== See also ==
- Tante Cose da Veder with Petr Hapka, Michal Horáček & Ondřej Brzobohatý
