= Karel Gott discography =

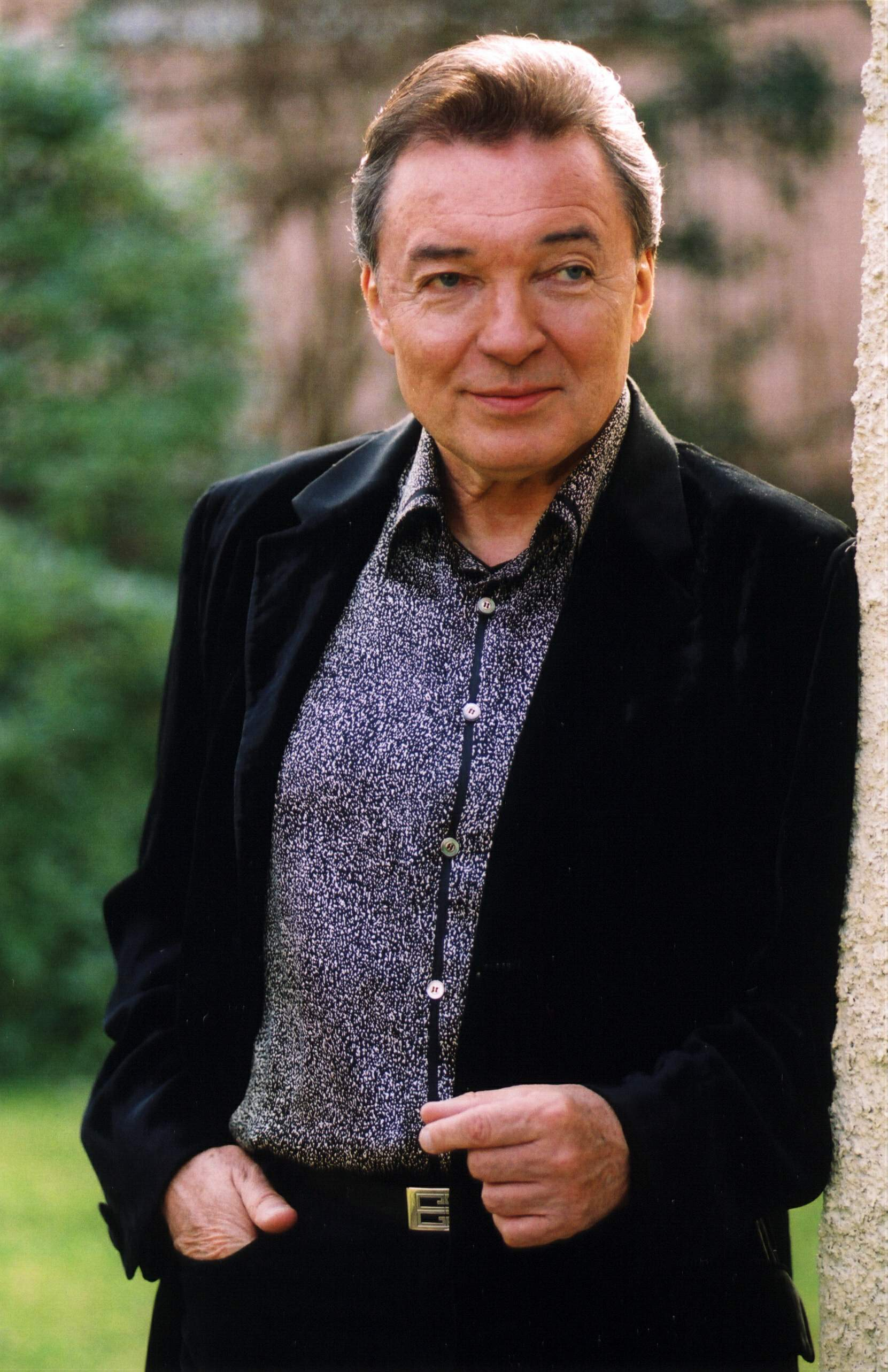

The discography of Karel Gott, a Czech singer.

== Albums ==
=== Studio ===
Year	Title	Chart Positions			Sales	IFPI Certifications
Year	Title	GER	AUT	CZ	Sales	IFPI Certifications
1968	Die goldene Stimme aus Prag	1				
1969	In mir klingt ein Lied	9				
1970	Vom Böhmerwald nach Wien with Peter Alexander					
1970	Der Star meines Lebens	33				
1971	Von Böhmen in die Welt	3				
1971	Von Romeo und Julia	30				
1972	Hol’ die Welt in dein Haus	45				
1973	Karel Gott					
1973	My Czech Favourites				CZ: 250,000	
1975	Vom Böhmerwald zum Wienerwald with Peter Alexander					
1975	Die neue LP					
1977	Heut’ ist der schönste Tag in meinem Leben					
1978	Gute Reise mit Karel Gott					
1978	My Romantic Feeling					
1979	Alle Jahre wieder					
1979	Amore Mio					
1979	Triumph der Goldenen Stimme	2	11			BVMI: Gold
1980	Eine Liebe ist viele Tränen wert					
1981	Guten Abend, gute Laune	2	1			
1983	Du bist da für mich					
1989	Ich will dich so wie du bist					
1997	Duety				CZ: 165,000	
2000	Für immer jung					
2002	Swing kolekce					
2005	Jdi za štěstím ...					
2006	Má pouť			8		
2006	Schön, dass du geboren bist					
2007	Každý má svůj sen					
2009	Leben					
2010	Lidovky mého srdce			3		
2011	Sentiment			1		
2012	Dotek lásky			3		

=== Live ===
Year	Title
1972	Karel Gott Live in Bulgaria - Recital at the Festival "The Golden Orpheus' 72"
1973	Karel Gott Live - Höhepunkte aus seinen Konzertprogrammen
1981	Karel Gott Live
1985	Live '85

== Singles ==
Year	Title	Chart Positions	
Year	Title	GER	AUT
1967	"Schiwago Melodie (Weißt du wohin)"	9	
1968	"Lady Carneval"	10	
1968	"Was damals war"	8	
1970	"Einmal um die ganze Welt"	10	17
1970	"Star meines Lebens"	31	
1971	"Schicksalsmelodie"	25	
1971	"Das sind die schönsten Jahre"	31	
1975	"Rosa Rosa"	41	
1976	"Wie der Teufel es will (Maria Maddalena)"	35	
1977	"Die Biene Maja"		18
1978	"Zwei Herzen ohne Heimat"		
1978	"Das Mädchen aus Athen"	27	
1978	"Lago Maggiore"		
1979	"Babička"	20	
1980	"Eine Liebe ist viele Tränen wert"	38	
1980	"Wenn ich Dich nicht hätte"	20	
1981	"Du bist da für mich"		
1982	"Und die Sonne wird wieder scheinen"		
1986	"Fang das Licht" with Darinka	15	7
1989	"Du bist für mich wie die Sonne am Morgen"	63	
1990	"Nie mehr Bolero"	33	
1997	"Zeit zu geh’n (Con Te Partiro)"	86	
2000	"Für immer jung"		
2008	"Für immer jung" with Bushido^{A}	5	15
2009	"Fang das Licht" with DJ Ötzi	57	31

- ^{A}"Für Immer Jung" also peaked at #70 in Switzerland.

== DVD ==
- 2004: Mein Prag

== Other appearances ==
- 1987: "Neznámy pár" - duet with Marika Gombitová, Ateliér duše
- 1987: "Hrajme píseň" - trio with Marika Gombitová and Josef Laufer
- 2011: Tante Cose da Veder with Hapka, Horáček & Ondřej Brzobohatý
