= Three Wishes for Cinderella =

Three Wishes for Cinderella may refer to

- Three Wishes for Cinderella (1973 film), Czechoslovak / East German film
  - Three Wishes for Cinderella (2021 film), Norwegian remake
