= Karel Svoboda (composer) =

Czech composer (1938–2007)

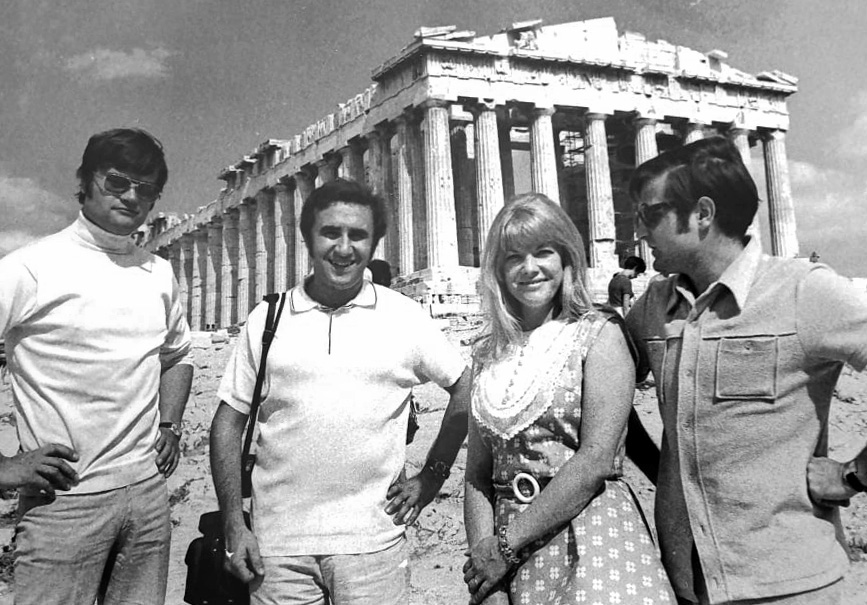
- Svoboda (left) in Athens 1969
- Born: 19 December 1938; Prague, Czechoslovakia
- Died: 28 January 2007 (aged 68); Jevany, Czech Republic
- Occupation: Composer
- Years active: 1963–2007
- Spouse: Vendula Horová (m. 1995)

Karel Svoboda (19 December 1938 – 28 January 2007) was a Czech composer of popular music. He wrote music for many TV series in the 1970s.

== Career ==
Svoboda was born in Prague, Czechoslovakia, and began his career as a pop composer after abandoning medicine in his third year of university. He became a member of the rock band Mefisto in 1963, where he played piano. Later, he composed music for the Laterna Magika theatre in Prague and for many Czech singers. In 1969 he wrote a song titled "Lady Carneval" for Karel Gott, a major Czech pop star. Svoboda wrote a total of 80 songs for Gott, including "Hej, Hej, Baby" and "Die Biene Maja". His long-time collaborator was lyricist Jiří Štaidl.

Svoboda composed TV scores for the German channel ZDF for over 30 years. He wrote scores to many TV series in the 1970s and 1980s which a whole generation of Europeans grew up with. Some examples of these TV series are Vicky the Viking, Maya the Bee and The Wonderful Adventures of Nils. He also composed the score for the movie Three Wishes for Cinderella.

Svoboda wrote scores for almost 90 films and TV series.

He also wrote scores for several musicals:

- Noc na Karlštejně
- Dracula (world premiere in Prague on 13 October 1995)
- Monte Christo (2000)
- Golem (2006, book by Zdeněk Zelenka)

In 1995, he married Vendula Svobodová.

Svoboda was found dead from gunshot wounds in the garden of his villa at Jevany on January 28, 2007. It is believed that he committed suicide.
