= Vendula Pizingerová =

Czech philanthropist (born 1972)

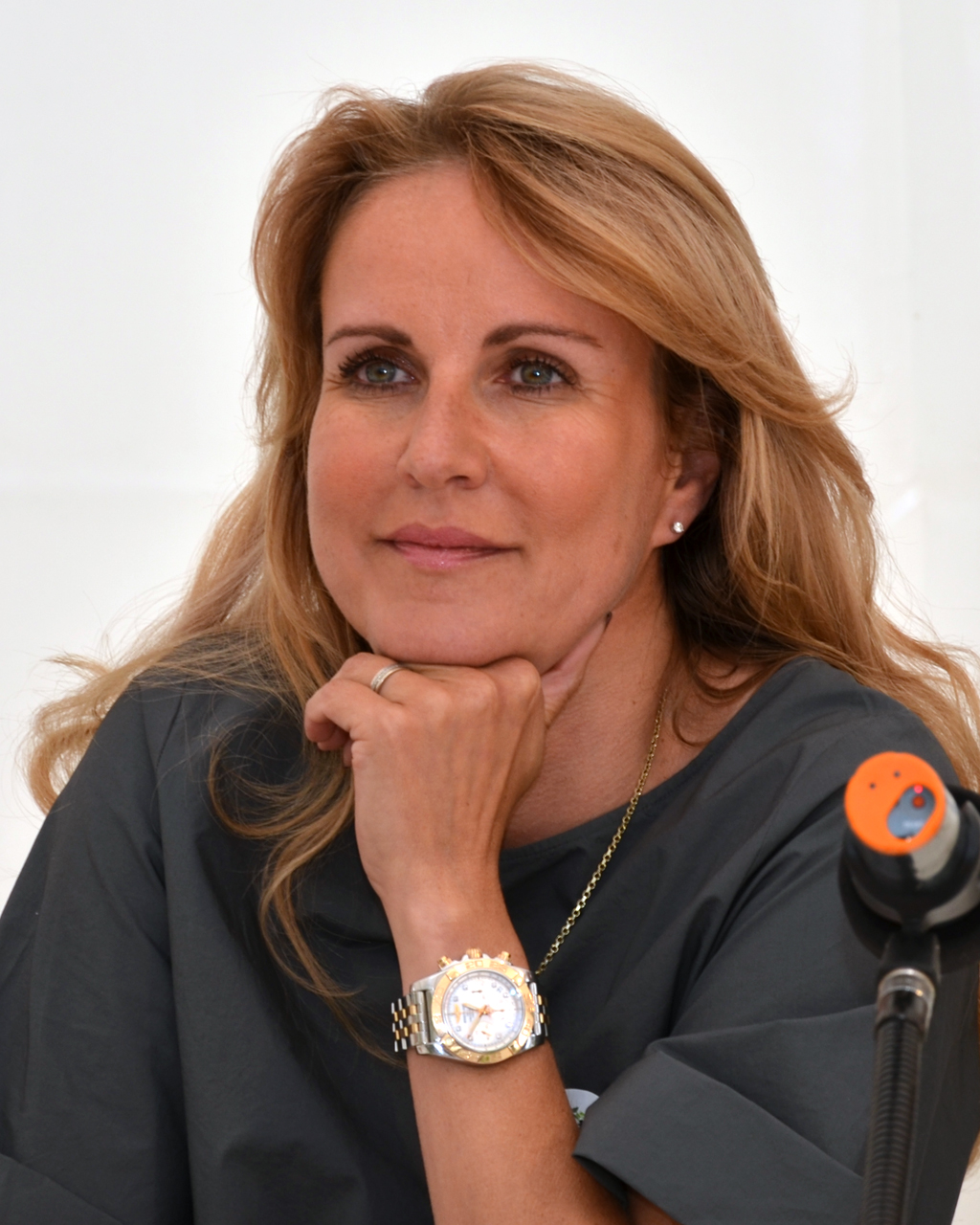
- Pizingerová in 2017
- Born: Václava Horová; 18 February 1972 (age 54); Prague, Czechoslovakia
- Occupation: Philanthropist
- Spouse(s): Karel Svoboda (m. 1995; died 2007) Patrik Auš (m. 2009; div. 2012) Josef Pizinger (m. 2015)
- Children: 3

Vendula Pizingerová (born Václava Horová; married Svobodová; born 18 February 1972) is a Czech philanthropist. She is the president of the Kapka naděje Foundation Fund. She has received several Woman of the Year awards for her work, and in 2014 she was awarded the Order of Laurels. Her first husband was the composer Karel Svoboda.

== Early life and career ==
She was born on 18 February 1972 in Prague. She is from Černošice. After graduating from secondary school, she worked at an advertising agency and later for the Party of Entrepreneurs.

She later founded the Kapka naděje Foundation Fund. Since 2000, her public activities have been primarily associated with leading this foundation and supporting seriously ill children and their families. In the media, she is described as its founder and president. The foundation focuses on helping paediatric oncology patients and the medical facilities where they are treated.

== Personal life ==
In 1995, she married the composer Karel Svoboda (1938–2007), with whom she lived in Jevany. Their daughter Klárka was born in January 1996. She developed leukemia at the age of two and died at the age of four. In 2005, the couple's son Jakub was born. Svoboda died in 2007.

After her husband's death, she began appearing in public with businessman Patrik Auš, whom she married in September 2009. Their marriage ended in 2012.

In September 2015, she married Josef Pizinger. In October 2020, their son Josef was born.
