= Filip Albrecht =

German-Czech lyricist (born 1977)

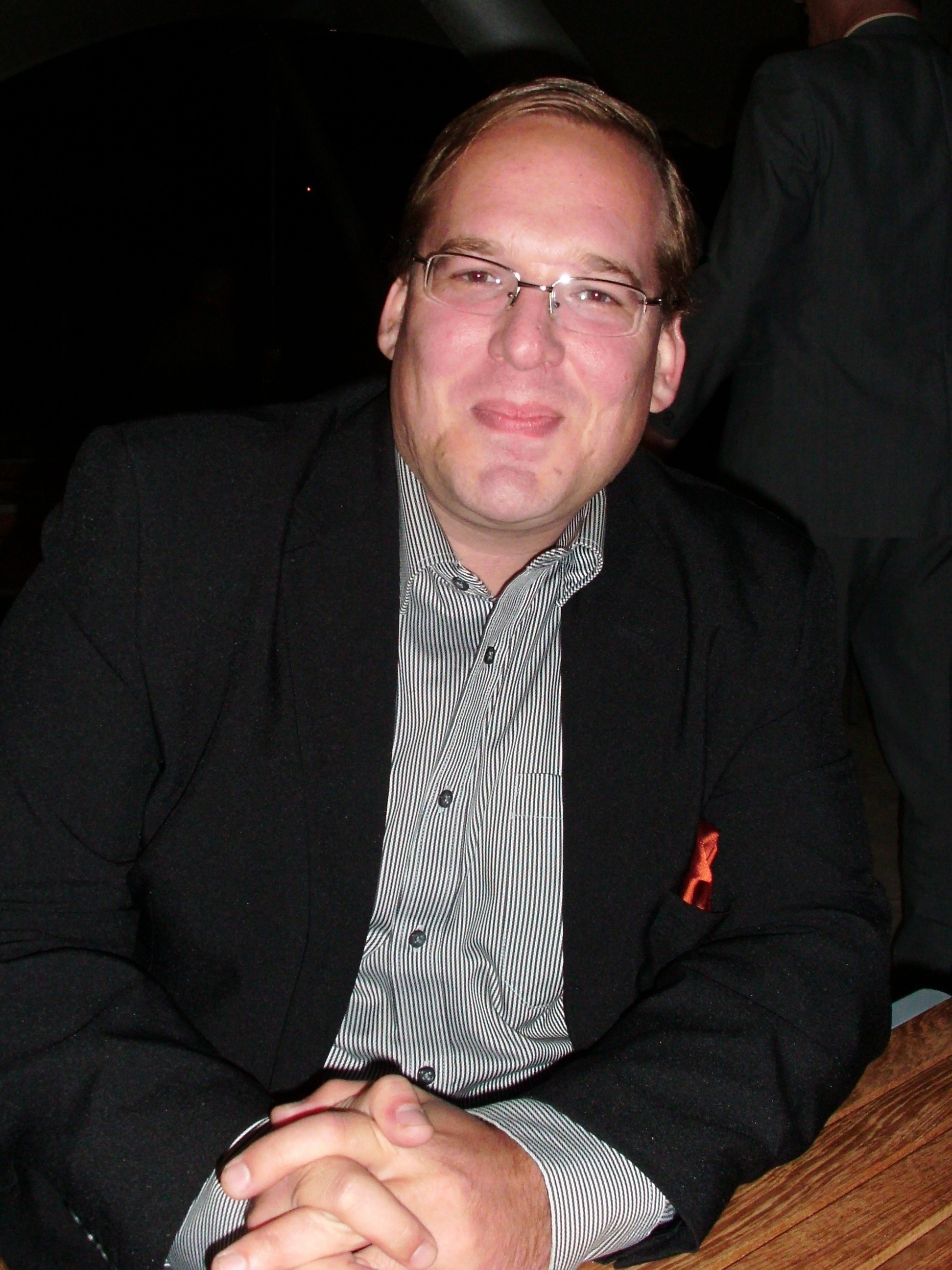
- Albrecht in 2012
- Born: Hanns Philipp Albrecht; 28 November 1977 (age 48); Munich, West Germany
- Occupations: Lyricist; manager; producer; film distributor; TV host; writer
- Years active: 1999–present

Filip Albrecht (born 28 November 1977) is a lyricist, manager, producer, film distributor, TV host, and writer.

== Early life ==
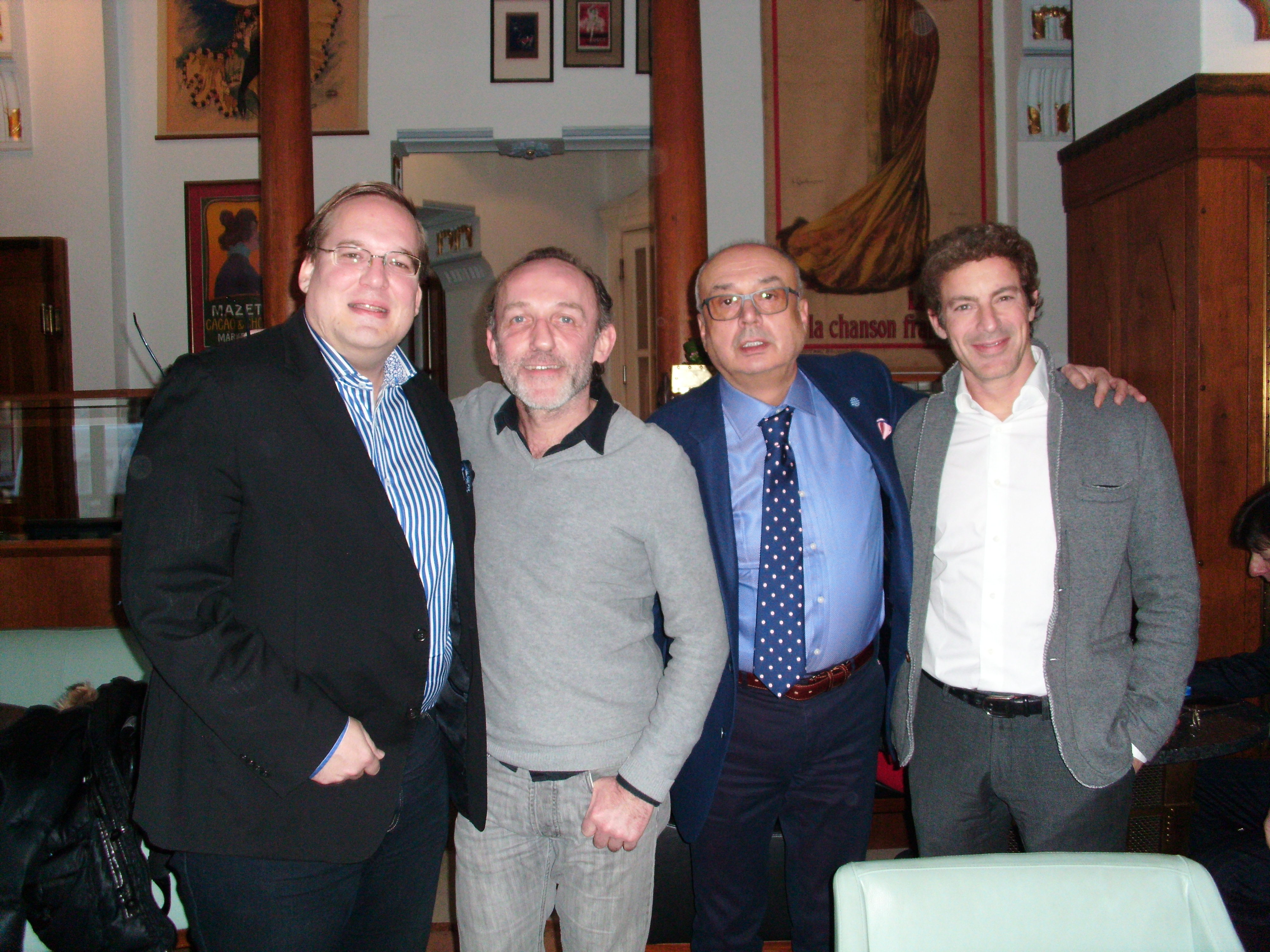
Filip Albrecht, Karl Markovics, Peter Kovárčík and Gedeon Burkhard at The Devil's Mistress press conference in Prague, 2015

Born in Munich, Albrecht grew up in Bavaria. In 1999, he decided to move to Prague and found a media company to distribute Czech movies all over the world. Albrecht is a member of the Rotary Club Prague International.

== Career ==
=== 2000s ===
In 2001, Albrecht began to work as the German lyricist for the two international most successful Czech singers, Karel Gott and Helena Vondráčková, writing for them from 2001 to 2017 over 30 songs such as Jede Nacht, Das Lachen meiner Kinder or Schau nach vorn, which were released mainly in the German market (Universal Music Group Germany, Electrola). Since 2003 he is Vondráčkova's producer and manager for Germany, Austria and Switzerland. Albrecht is also the manager of legendary Czech actor and entertainer Pavel Trávníček (Three Wishes for Cinderella).

In 2002, Albrecht started his cooperation with the Zlín Film Festival being named the Head of International Relations by Czech culture minister Vítěžslav Jandák as well as the Febiofest. From 2002 until 2015, he brought to the Czech Republic dozens of film personalities like Peter Ustinov, Jürgen Prochnow, Helmut Berger, Maximilian Schell, Pierre Brice, Ottfried Fischer, Hanna Schygulla, Dani Levy, Gojko Mitić, Frank Beyer, Götz George or Armin Mueller-Stahl. As a librettist he wrote the German version of the fairy tale Tři bratři ("Three Brothers"), directed by Academy Award winner Jan Svěrák, and the ice show Aschenputtel on Ice.

=== 2010s ===
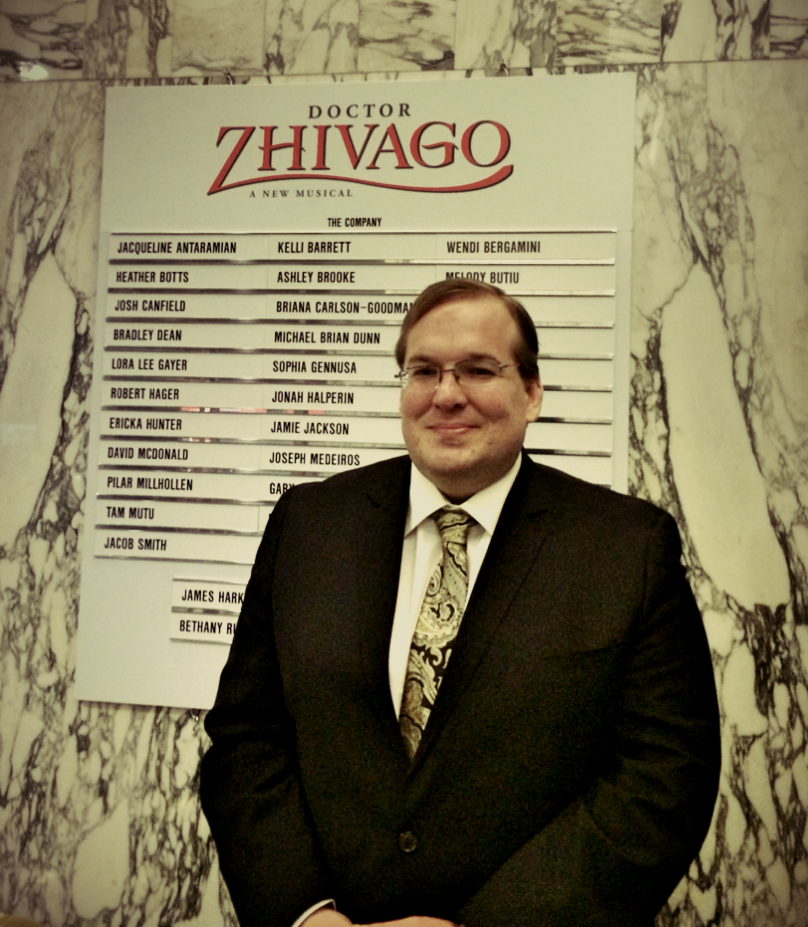
Filip Albrecht at the Broadway premiere of Doctor Zhivago, 2015

Since 2013, Albrecht has been the programme director and vice-president of the popular Czech television channels Šlágr TV and Country Nr.1. He is the co-author and ghostwriter of Karel Gott's autobiography Zwischen zwei Welten ("Between Two Worlds"), which was released in Germany in May 2014.

Albrecht hosts the Czech-Slovak television show Se Šlágrem na cestách (lit. 'With Music on the Road') and appears on several celebrity talk shows. For his work as an "ambassador" of Czech music and television shows he was honoured in the Smago Award 2014 ceremony with the ADS Medienpreis by the Arbeitsgemeinschaft Deutscher Schlager & Volksmusik e.v. in Berlin in November 2014.

Albrecht is the coproducer of the biographical film movie The Devil's Mistress (director: Filip Renč) about the life of Czech actress Lída Baarová and her affair with Joseph Goebbels starring Karl Markovics, Gedeon Burkhard and Tatiana Pauhofova.

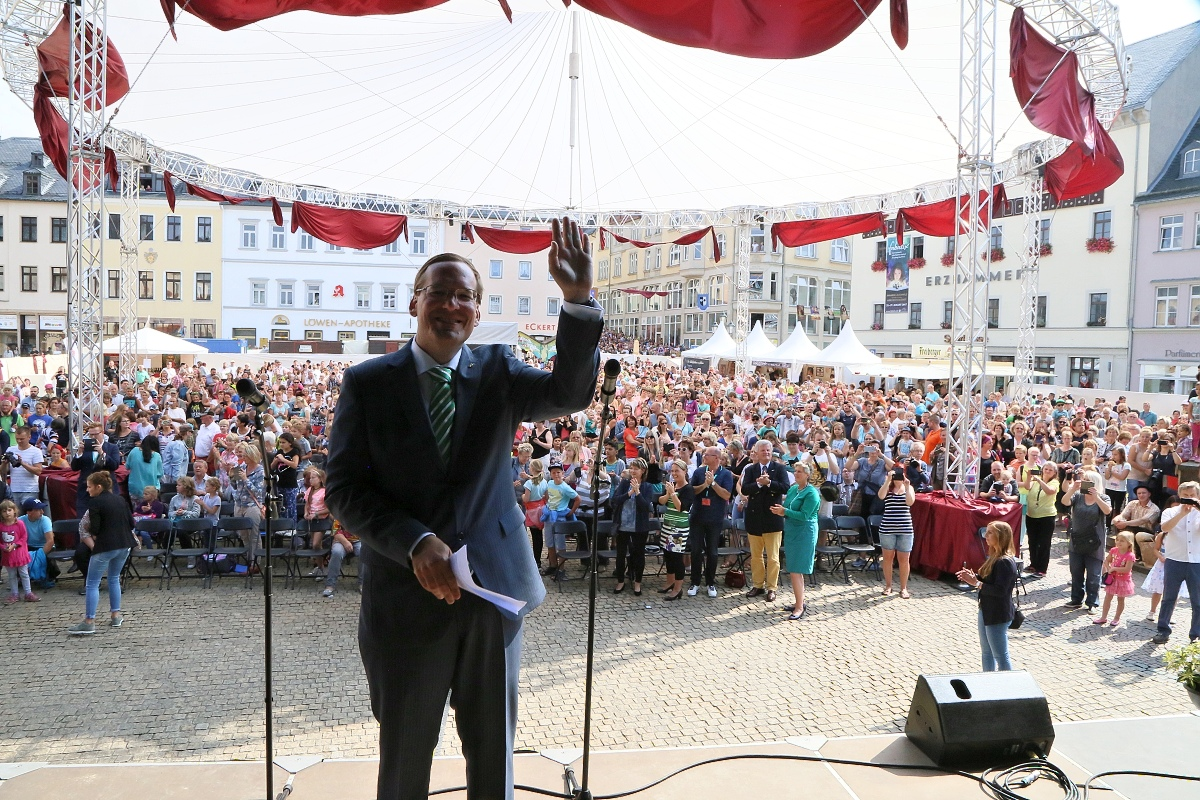
Albrecht presenting the Closing Gala of the Fabulix Film Festival, 2017

In October 2016, Albrecht was named the Festival Director of the first European Fairy Tale Film Festival Internationales Märchenfilmfestival Fabulix in Annaberg-Buchholz (Saxony). Albrecht is a founding member of the festival. The first edition of the festival (2017) took place from 23 August to the 27th, and was visited by over 20.000 guests.
