= Mrazivá tajemství =

Czech web series

- Genre: Comedy; Horror
- Directed by: Radovan Surý, Pavel Jindra
- Starring: Pavel Rímský; Zdeněk Julina; Luděk Randár; Jana Tomečková; Pavel Jindra; Pavel Trávníček; Lukáš Pavlásek; Karel Oliva; Radim Uzel; Robert Rosenberg; Jiří X. Doležal; Roman Vaněk; Pavel Leicman
- Country of origin: Czech Republic
- Original language: Czech
- No. of seasons: 3
- No. of episodes: 20

Production
- Running time: 5 minutes

Original release
- Network: Stream.cz
- Release: October 20, 2016 – April 12, 2018

Mrazivá tajemství (The Dark Secret) is a Czech web series that premiered between 2016 and 2018 on internet television Stream.cz.

== Plot ==
The series focuses on individual fairy tales or stories and reveals their Dark Secret. The show "reveals the truth" about various fairy tale characters who are considered heroes or brave people in the fairy tales themselves, but according to the show revealing their dark sides, they can become psychopaths. Each part first began with a brief introduction to the plot of the fairy tale, which was, however, sometimes amended or supplemented. During the program, the fairy tale and especially the characters and circumstances were gradually analyzed. At the end, there was always a brief summary of the work and the fairy tale.

== Broadcast ==
=== Season 1 ===
The show first aired on 20 October 2016 when the first Snow White episode was released. First of all, four more parts of the series were released, broadcast every other week on Thursdays, which dealt with Hansel and Gretel, Little Red Riding Hood, Masha and the Three Bears and Pinocchio. The episodes had an average length of about 6 minutes, and the viewer could view them all on the mobile app immediately, whereas they could not see them on the Internet. The first season finally came to an end on November 17, 2016, with the last episode airing on the Internet.

=== Season 2 ===
The first episode of the second season was broadcast on 9 November 2017 and discussed the creation of the world. The average length of the episodes was reduced to 4–5 minutes, more episodes were broadcast and not all were immediately available on the mobile app. The pieces did not only deal with fairy tales, but also with various biblical stories. A total of 8 episodes were broadcast in the second season, the last episode of the second season dealing with aliens was broadcast on Sunday 31 December 2017.

=== Season 3 ===
The third season of the series began to be broadcast on March 1, 2018, and was about Grandfather Czech. This series had a total of 7 episodes. Unlike the two previous series, the series stopped focusing on fairy tales and instead was interested in problems in history, the Bible or even in the ordinary world. The program was also shown on the TV station Seznam.cz. Due to the greater controversy of the show, its viewership decreased significantly, which was approximately 433 thousand viewers per episode for the first series, approximately 401 thousand viewers per episode for the second series, and decreased to approximately 135 thousand viewers per episode for the third series.
