= Radim Uzel =

Czech sexologist and educator (1940–2022)

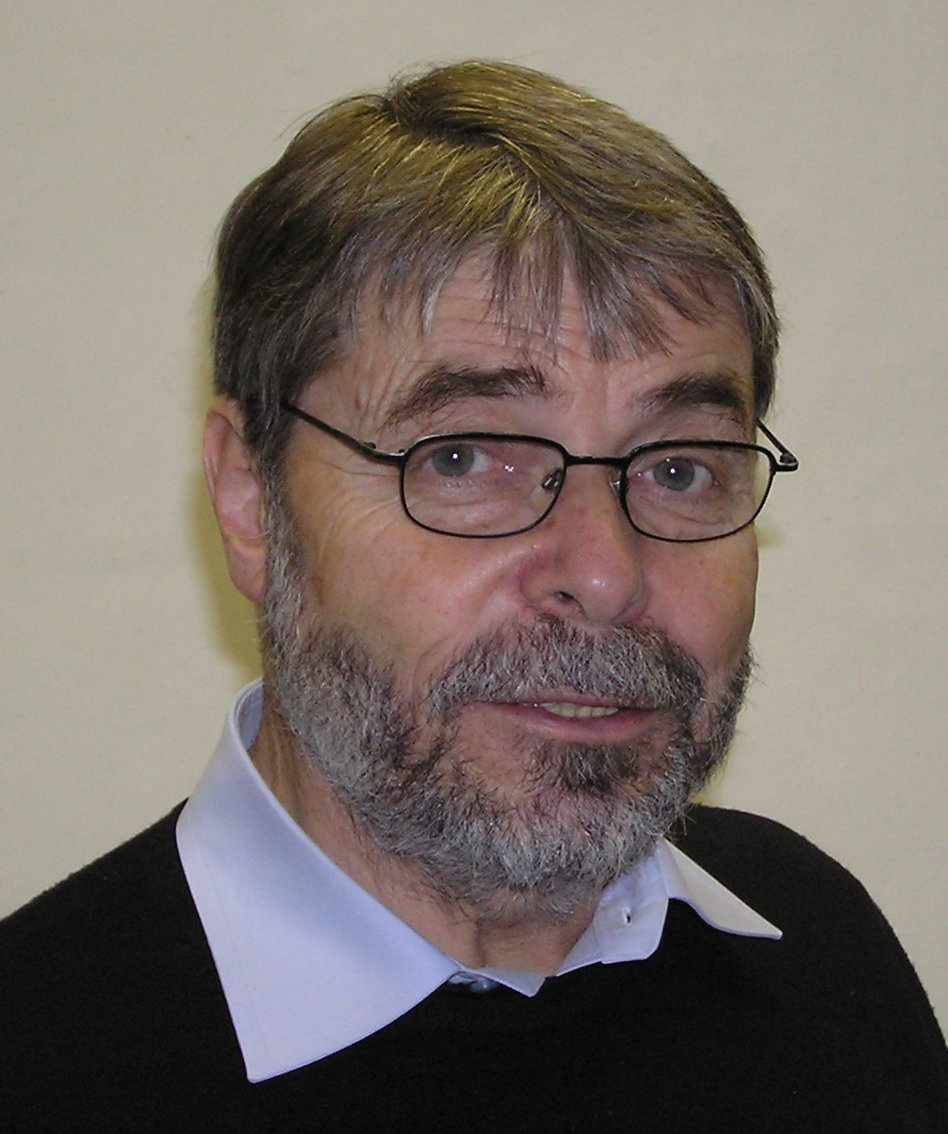
- Uzel in 2006
- Born: 27 March 1940; Ostrava, Protectorate of Bohemia and Moravia
- Died: 2 May 2022 (aged 82); Prague, Czech Republic
- Education: Masaryk University
- Occupation: Sexologist

Radim Uzel (27 March 1940 – 2 May 2022) was a Czech sexologist, educator and science popularizer. He often spoke in the media about sexological topics and wrote several dozen books on the subject.

== Biography ==
Uzel was born in Ostrava. He studied at the gymnasium in Orlová, then he studied at the medical faculty of Masaryk University in Brno, graduating in 1963. He married in 1967, and the marriage lasted until his wife's death in 2021.

In 1973, he became head of the department of gynecological sexology and endocrinology in Ostrava. After 1989, he moved to the Institute for Mother and Child Care in Prague, which is also one of the largest maternity hospitals in the country. He became a popularizer of sexology and often spoke in the media on sexological topics. He was actively involved in scientific activities and education in the field of sexology. In 2020, he received the state award Medal of Merit (First Class).

Radim Uzel was a long-time director of Society for Family Planning and Sexual Education (Czech: Společnost pro plánování rodiny a sexuální výchovu). Uzel was also an unsuccessful candidate for the Senate of the Czech Republic. He ran for office several times between 2002 and 2012.

Uzel died in Prague on 2 May 2022, aged 82. He had been battling stomach cancer.

== Selected works ==
Uzel is the author of over 40 books, focused primarily on education in the field of sexology. His books include:

- Ženské otazníky ("Women's Question Marks", 1987)
- Mýty a pověry v sexu (Myths and Superstitions in Sex", 1990)
- Sex – odhalené tabu ("Sex - Taboos Revealed", 1992)
- Jak neotěhotnět ("How Not to Get Pregnant", 1992)
- Umění milovat ("The Art of Loving", 1993)
- Nepraktův atlas sexu ("Neprakta's Atlas of Sex", 1994)
- Zákony ženské přitažlivosti ("The Laws of Female Attraction"; together with Miroslav Plzák, 1995)
- Sex a lidské vztahy humorně i vážně ("Sex and Human Relationships Humorously and Seriously"; together with Petr Parma, 1997)
- Člověk je živočich sexuální ("Man is a Sexual Animal"; together with Ladislav Hess, 1998)
- Červenné uši (first edition) / Červenání s doktorem Radimem Uzlem (second edition) ("Red Ears" / "Redness with Dr. Radim Uzel"; together with Pavel Malúš, 1998/1999)
- Erótova lampa ("The Lamp of Eros"; together with Karel Koubek, 1999)
- Antikoncepční kuchařka ("The Contraceptive Cookbook", 1999)
- Potrat ano – ne ("Abortion yes – no"; together with Milena Pekárková, Hana Primusová and Milan Salajka, 2000)
- Sexuální zvěřinec ("Sexual Menagerie", Ikar 2000)
- Pornografie aneb provokující nahota ("Pornography or provocative nudity", 2004)
- Intímní slasti a strasti ("Intimate pleasures and sorrows", 2009)
- Antikoncepční otazníky: o antikoncepci převážně vážně ("Contraceptive question marks: mostly serious about contraception"; together with Petr Kovář, 2010)
- Nevěra a co s ní ("Infidelity and what to do with it", 2010)
- Užitečné pohlaví ("Useful sex", 2012)

== In popular culture ==
Radim Uzel made a cameo appearance in It Will Stay Between Us (2003) and participated in dubbing of Mrazivá tajemství (2016–2018).

Radim Uzel hosted the 1990s radio show Červenání, where he answered listeners' questions about sexology. The answers to the questions resulted in one of his books.
