= Die Biene Maja (song) =

1976 song performed by Karel Gott

Single by Karel Gott
- Language: German
- Genre: Schlager
- Length: 2:41
- Label: Polydor
- Composer: Karel Svoboda
- Lyricist: Florian Cusano
- Producer: Otto Demler

Audio
- "Die Biene Maja" on YouTube

"Die Biene Maja"

Song by James Last Orchestra

Audio
- "Die Biene Maja" on YouTube

"Die Biene Maja" is the title song of the German version of the Japanese anime Maya the Honey Bee. The song was composed by Czech composer Karel Svoboda with lyrics by Florian Cusano and recorded by Czech singer Karel Gott.

Later, Gott recorded the song in Czech and Slovak for the Czech and Slovak dubs of the series.

In the second season of the German-language version, Gott's recording was used only for the first few episodes, and then replaced with a rendition by James Last Orchestra with female choir vocals.

== Track listings ==
7" single (Polydor 2041 851, 1977)

A. "Die Biene Maja" (2:41)
B. "Bunter Schmetterling" (3:00)

== Charts ==
Chart (1977)	Peak position
Austria (Ö3 Austria Top 40)	18

== Helene Fischer cover ==
For the 2012 German-French reboot of the animated series, Maya the Bee, the song was recorded by German schlager singer Helene Fischer.

=== Track listing ===
Digital single (Polydor/UMG, 2013)

1. "Die Biene Maja"

=== Charts ===
Chart (2013)	Peak position
Germany (GfK)	78
