= Three Wishes for Cinderella (2021 film) =

2021 Norwegian fantasy film

- Directed by: Cecilie Mosli
- Based on: Three Wishes for Cinderella
- Starring: Astrid Smeplass
- Release date: 12 November 2021
- Running time: 87 minutes
- Country: Norway
- Language: Norwegian

Three Wishes for Cinderella (Norwegian: Tre nøtter til Askepott) is a 2021 Norwegian fairy-tale film based on the 1973 Czechoslovak/East German film of the same name. The original is based on the fairy tale "O Popelce" by Božena Němcová, which is a variation of "Cinderella".

== Cast ==
- Astrid Smeplass as Cinderella
- Cengiz Al as the prince
- Ellen Dorrit Petersen as the stepmother
- Ingrid Giæver as Dora
- Bjørn Sundquist as Alfred
- Anne Marit Jacobsen as Rosa
- Nader Khademi as Baron von Snauser
- Kristofer Hivju as the groom
