= Pavel Trávníček =

Czech actor (born 1950)

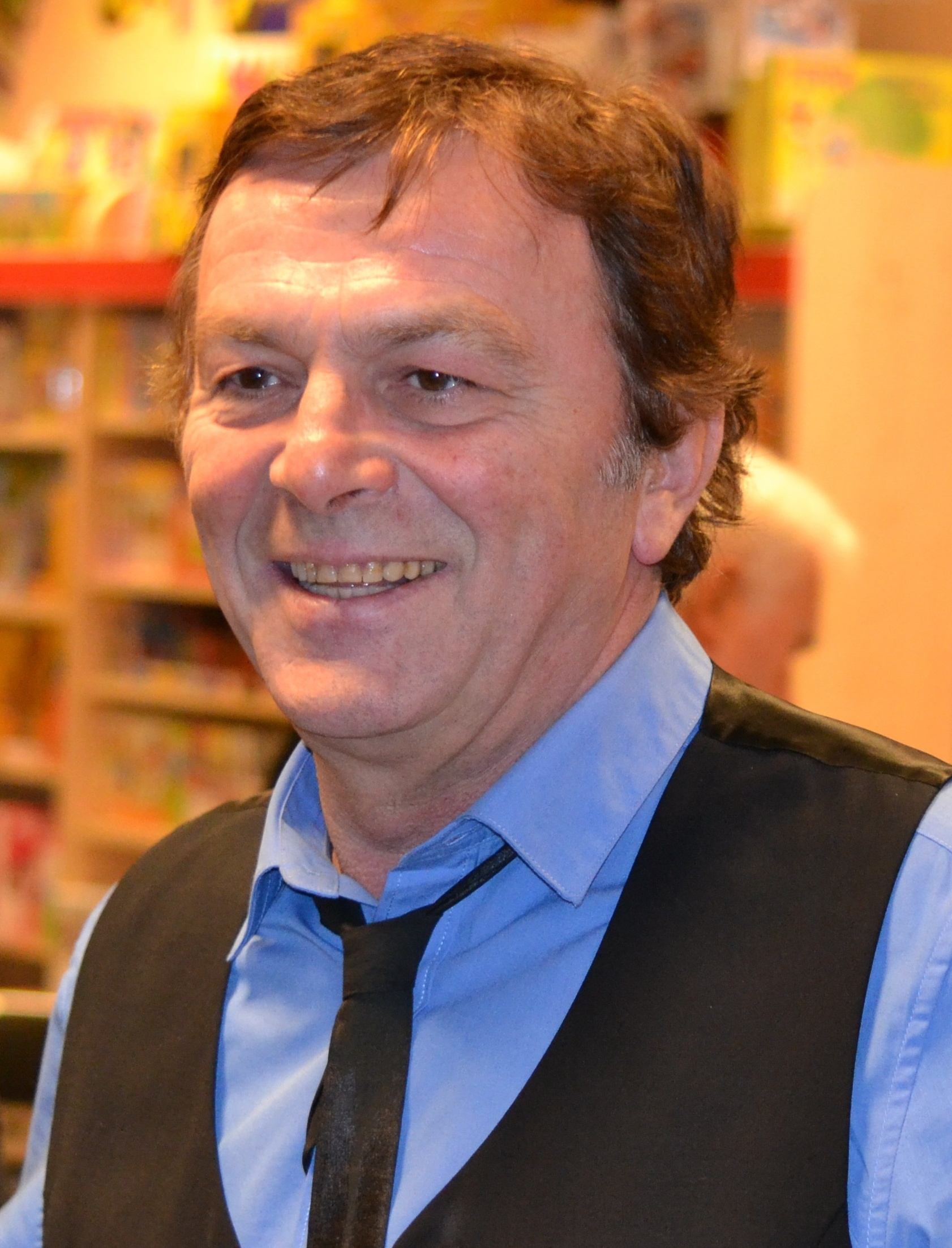
- Pavel Trávníček in 2013
- Born: October 26, 1950 (age 75); Konice, Czechoslovakia (today Czech Republic)
- Occupation: Actor
- Years active: 1971–present

Pavel Trávníček (born October 26, 1950) is a Czech actor. He has appeared in more than 70 film and television productions since 1971, most of them produced in Czechoslovakia/Czech Republic, occasionally in Germany.

== Life and career ==
Trávníček is probably best-known for his starring role as the Prince in the fairy-tale film Tři oříšky pro Popelku (Three Wishes for Cinderella), a holiday classic in many European countries. He subsequently portrayed a number of leading roles in fairy-tale films during the 1970s and 1980s, including Třetí princ (The Third Prince, 1983), in which he was reunited with his Tři oříšky pro Popelku co-star Libuše Šafránková. In 1998, he founded his own theatre Skelet in Prague.

He has been married four times and married his fourth wife, Monika, in 2015; they have a son born in December 2016. He also has two adult sons from his previous marriages.

== Filmography (selection) ==
- Hry lásky šálivé (1971)
- Tři oříšky pro Popelku (1973)
- Sebechlebskí hudci (1976)
- Příbeh lásky a cti (1978)
- Schneeweißchen und Rosenrot (1979, GDR)
- Třetí princ (1983)
- Podivná přátelství herce Jesenia (1985)
- Vyprávěj (2009–2013, TV series, 18 episodes)
- Der große Rudolph (2018)
