= Neznámy pár =

- A screenshot of TV show Abeceda by ČST

Song by Marika Gombitová and Karel Gott

from the album Ateliér duše
- Language: Slovak
- Released: 1987
- Genre: Pop
- Length: 4:10
- Label: OPUS
- Songwriters: Marika Gombitová; Kamil Peteraj
- Producer: Peter Smolinský

Audio sample
- "Neznámy pár": file; help

Music video
- "Neznámy pár" on YouTube

Neznámy pár (English: An Unknown Couple) is a duet by Marika Gombitová and Karel Gott released on OPUS in 1987.

The composition wrote Gombitová herself upon a request from František Polák, editor of the pre-filmed live show called Abeceda, created by ČST. Lyrics provided Kamil Peteraj, and the composition was presented on television on 1 November 1987. During the night show, both artists sung also "Hrajme píseň"), a trio recorded in collaboration with Czech actor Josef Laufer.

The duet itself was officially released on Gombitová's studio album entitled Ateliér duše (1987), and received a nomination for Zlatá nota, awarded by publicists of the Melodie magazine.

Later on, "Neznámy pár" was issued on Gott's compilation Zůstanu svůj: Hity z 80. let, which charted at number #9 on the Czech Top 50 albums chart in 2008.

== Official versions ==
1. "Neznámy pár" - Studio version, 1987

== Credits and personnel ==
- Marika Gombitová - lead vocal, writer
- Karel Gott - lead vocal
- Vašo Patejdl - piano, keyboards, LinnDrum computer, chorus
- Kamil Peteraj - lyrics
- Juraj Burian - electric and acoustic guitar
- Andrej Šeban - electric guitar
- Michal Důžek - chorus
- Peter Penthor - chorus
- Trend band - chorus
- Štefan Danko - responsible editor
- Peter Smolinský - producer
- Juraj Filo - sound director
- Jozef Krajčovič - sound director
- Ivan Minárik - technical coordination

== Awards ==
=== Melodie ===
Melodie was a modern music magazine (similarly to American Billboard) established in 1963 as a monthly periodical in Czechoslovakia. For the time of being, a bi-weekly rival entitled as Aktuality Melodie (also known as Áčko) was effective (1969–70). The magazine itself survived almost three decades, ceasing its operations in 1991. Apart from winning the Tip Melodie award as the Best Female Singer (1979), Gombitová and Gott scored with the 87's duet at number #7 (respectively at #8)^{A} as Best Performer.

Year	Nominated work	Category	Result
1987	"Neznámy pár"	Best Performer	#7^{A}
1987	"Neznámy pár"	Best Performer	#8^{A}

Notes

- ^{A} The prize recognized as Zlatá nota (however, not to be confused with a different award of the same title) was shared with Gott, as a result of their common duet.

== See also ==
- Hrajme píseň - trio with Karel Gott and Josef Laufer
