= Three Wishes for Cinderella (1973 film) =

Czechoslovak/East German fairy-tale film

Tři oříšky pro popelku/Drei Haselnüsse für Aschenbrödel
- DVD cover of the Norwegian version, Tre nøtter til Askepott
- Directed by: Václav Vorlíček
- Written by: František Pavlíček
- Based on: O Popelce by Božena Němcová
- Produced by: Jiří Krejčík
- Starring: Libuše Šafránková; Pavel Trávníček
- Cinematography: Josef Illík
- Edited by: Miroslav Hájek; Barbara Leuschner
- Music by: Karel Svoboda
- Production companies: Barrandov Studios, DEFA
- Distributed by: Ústřední půjčovna filmů
- Release dates: 26 October 1973 (Prague); 1 November 1973 (Soviet Union); 16 November 1973 (Czechoslovakia); 8 March 1974 (East Germany)
- Running time: 83 minutes
- Countries: Czechoslovakia; East Germany
- Languages: Czech; German

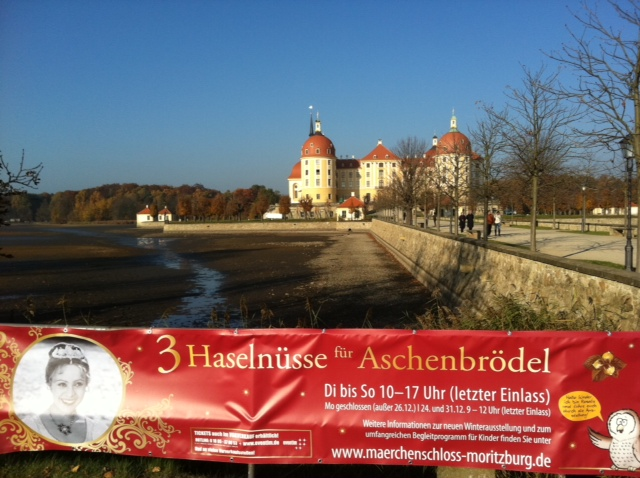
Exhibition about "Drei Haselnüsse für Aschenbrödel" in Moritzburg, Germany

Three Wishes for Cinderella (Czech: Tři oříšky pro Popelku; German: Drei Haselnüsse für Aschenbrödel, also called in English Three Hazelnuts for Cinderella or Three Gifts for Cinderella) is a 1973 Czechoslovak-East German film based on the fairy-tale Cinderella.

It was directed by Václav Vorlíček in a co-production between DEFA-Studio für Spielfilme and Barrandov Studios. The story was based on the fairy tale O Popelce written by Božena Němcová (a Bohemian variation of the classic Cinderella fairytale). It still remains a popular Christmas holiday film in many European countries.

== Plot ==
Cinderella's stepmother has the village in a frenzy preparing for the arrival of the king and queen, who will be stopping en route to their nearby castle. Cinderella takes the blame for a kitchen boy's accident, prompting her stepmother to berate her as well as her late father. Enraged, Cinderella snaps back at her, and is subsequently punished by having to separate lentils and ashes mixed together in a bucket. As she settles down to work, her friends, a flock of white doves, come in to separate the mixture for her. Freed of her punishment, Cinderella visits the stable to see her white horse, which she used to ride in the forest with her father while hunting. As the royal party approaches, everyone gathers to greet them, except Cinderella, who is forbidden to attend as the Stepmother wants to showcase her own spoiled daughter, Dora, since the Prince is expected to marry soon.

Cinderella uses the distraction to slip away with her horse, visit her pet owl, and enjoy the wintry forest. However, her ride is cut short as she happens upon the Prince and his companions, Vítek and Kamil, hunting there. They spot a doe struggling in the snow, but the Prince's crossbow shot is foiled by a snowball thrown by Cinderella. They give chase and catch up with her, laughing at her as an impudent child. She insults the prince, escapes, and mounts his horse, Dapples. They chase her with renewed urgency since Dapples has a reputation of being unmanageable. To their surprise, she rides him easily before transferring to her own horse and sending Dapples back to the Prince.

The Stepmother uses the royal visit to wrangle an invitation to the ball from the King, who reluctantly offers it out of politeness. En route to the castle, they are joined by the Prince's party. The King, annoyed by his son's youthful irresponsibility, says the Prince must get married.

The Stepmother sends Vincek the servant to town to purchase fabrics and supplies to make new dresses for her and Dora. En route, he sees Cinderella forced to wash laundry in an icy stream. Feeling sympathetic but helpless, he promises to bring her a gift of whatever hits him on the nose. After hearing his father's plans to force him to become engaged at the ball, the Prince returns to the woods. He sees Vincek asleep in his sled, the horses drawing it home. Using his crossbow, he mischievously shoots a bird's nest from a tree branch, which falls on Vincek's face. Vincek finds a twig with three hazelnuts in the nest and decides that will be Cinderella's gift. Cinderella likes the present although her stepmother derides it as "fit for a squirrel."

The Stepmother and Dora realize they forgot to get new jewellery and go to town to choose it themselves. The Stepmother punishes Cinderella for impertinence again by forcing her to separate corn kernels from lentils. Once again, the doves help Cinderella. She visits her owl, wishing she had the same freedom to come and go. She wishes she had a disguise so she could venture out. One hazelnut drops from the twig and magically opens to show a complete hunter's outfit within. Suitably clothed, Cinderella goes into the woods, and sees the Prince with a hunting party. The lead huntsman shows a bejeweled ring that the King promises to the first hunter to shoot down a bird of prey. The hunters, including the Prince, cannot do so. Cinderella shoots it down, then shoots the arrow from the Prince's hand. Impressed by the "young huntsman," he puts the ring on Cinderella's gloved hand. He asks her to do better by shooting a pine cone from the top of a tree. She does so and then slips away as he marvels at her marksmanship. Chasing after her, he finds her high in a tree in her own clothes, refusing to tell where the "young huntsman" went.

The Stepmother and Dora leave for the castle ball. Visiting her owl, Cinderella wishes she could go, then wonders if she could get another outfit. A second hazelnut opens to reveal a lavish ball gown. Her horse is also saddled with an ornate sidesaddle. Riding to the castle, she makes her way to the ballroom. Donning a veil, she greets the Prince, who was tired of being pursued by the female guests. He finds the veiled stranger mysterious and charming. The King and Queen are amazed at his softened manner. She refuses to accept his proposal unless he can solve a riddle, which referenced their earlier meetings. She runs out and the Prince gives chase, following her back to her village. There, he has the women try on the slipper Cinderella had lost. The Stepmother and Dora return. Seeing the Prince, they scheme to snare him, tying up Cinderella and stealing her clothing. When he asks that the disguised Dora try on the slipper, the Stepmother snatches it and they ride away in a sled. The Prince chases until the sled falls into a pond. Seeing that it is actually Dora, he takes the slipper and returns to the village.

Cinderella visits her owl again. She is ecstatic to find that the final nut contains a wedding dress. Donning it, she rides out on her horse, surprising the village and the Prince. The slipper fits and she wants to return the ring, but he slips it back on her finger. She offers the riddle again and the Prince remembers his encounters with her alter egos. He proposes to Cinderella, who accepts, with the entire village cheering for her.

== Cast ==
- Libuše Šafránková as Cinderella (Popelka / Aschenbrödel)
- Pavel Trávníček as The Prince
- Carola Braunbock as The Stepmother
- Rolf Hoppe as The King
- Karin Lesch as The Queen
- Daniela Hlaváčová as Dora, Stepmother's Daughter and Thus Cinderella's Stepsister
- Vladimír Menšík as Vincek / Vinzek The Churl
- Jan Libíček as The Preceptor, Tutor to The Prince
- Vítězslav Jandák as Kamil, Aide of The Prince
- Jaroslav Drbohlav as Vítek, Aide of The Prince
- Míla Myslíková as The Stepmother's Housekeeper
- Jiří Růžička as The Kitchen Boy
- Helena Růžičková as Princess Droběna, Dressed In Red At The Ball; called Kleinröschen In German

The film was released in a Czech and a German version. The ensemble was composed of Czech and German actors all speaking their native languages. In the respective editions, they were dubbed into Czech or German.

Jana Preissová was offered the title role, but turned it down because she was pregnant at the time. Libuše Šafránková was cast instead.

== Production ==
The film was originally going to be set during warm weather, but director Václav Vorlíček suggested setting the film in winter instead and delayed filming for months.

Screenwriter František Pavlíček was blacklisted by the Czechoslovak government at the time the film was made. He was credited under a pseudonym instead, with the Barrandov Studio head and the director keeping his identity secret.

Theodor Pištěk and Günter Schmidt designed the costumes for the film. Theodor designed for the main and memorable characters (Cinderella, the Prince, the King, the Queen, the Stepmother, the Stepsister and Princess Droběna) while Günter designed for all other ones.

The film was shot between December 11, 1972 and March 29, 1973 at the DEFA studios in Potsdam-Babelsberg (Brandenburg), Moritzburg Castle in Saxony, in the Barrandov studios in Prague, and in various places in Bohemia in what was then Czechoslovakia, including the Švihov castle in western Bohemia and the Bohemian Forest.

== Release ==
The film's gala premiere was held at the Sevastopol cinema in Prague on October 26, 1973. After being theatrically released in Soviet Union on November 1, 1973 and in Czechoslovakia on November 16, the film had its international premiere in East Berlin in March 1974.

== International history ==
The BBC serialized the film in three thirty-minute segments under the title Three Gifts for Cinderella in 1974, adding English-language narration rather than dubbing the dialogue. Another English dub was made in the United States and the film was edited down to an hour, to be shown on the CBS Children's Film Festival miniseries, three times in 1974 through 1976. The American English dub was also shown in Canada on CBC Television (CBHT Halifax / CBIT Sydney / CBCT Charlottetown) in the Maritimes on 18 November 1978 and 10 March 1979. The film has become a holiday classic in several European countries.

The film is broadcast on TV during the Christmas season every year in the Czech Republic, Slovakia, Germany and Norway. It is also popular in Austria, Spain, the United Arab Emirates and the Philippines. In some countries, there are multiple broadcasts during December. This film's status has been likened to that held by Frank Capra's 1946 It's a Wonderful Life in the United States as a holiday staple.

This movie was released in Japan on VHS with Japanese dubbing. In 1977, it premiered in Catalonia with Catalan dubbing. It was the first time that a product oriented towards children was translated into that language.

== Soundtrack ==
The soundtrack was composed by Karel Svoboda. The love theme, Kdepak ty ptáčku hnízdo máš ("Where Is Your Nest, Little Bird?"), was sung by Czech pop singer Karel Gott.

== Digital restoration ==
With financial and technical support from Norway and its authorities, the Czech Film Archive and the National Library in Mo i Rana, Tři oříšky pro Popelku was restored, with digitally remastered picture quality. The project was financed through the EEA and Norway Grants which represent Norway's contribution to social and economic cohesion in the European Economic Area (EEA). Norway has granted just under 7.5 million NOK for efforts to digitize ten older Czech films. The digitization was completed by December 2015.

== Home video releases ==
Czech, Norwegian and German DVDs are available. A region-free DVD with a monophonic Czech audio track was released in the United Kingdom by Second Run in December 2016.

A Blu-ray edition with stereo Czech audio was also released in December 2016.

== Remake ==
A Norwegian remake of the film, Tre nøtter til Askepott, was released on 12 November 2021, starring Astrid S and Cengiz Al in the two lead roles and featuring Kristofer Hivju.
