= Jevany =

- Municipality
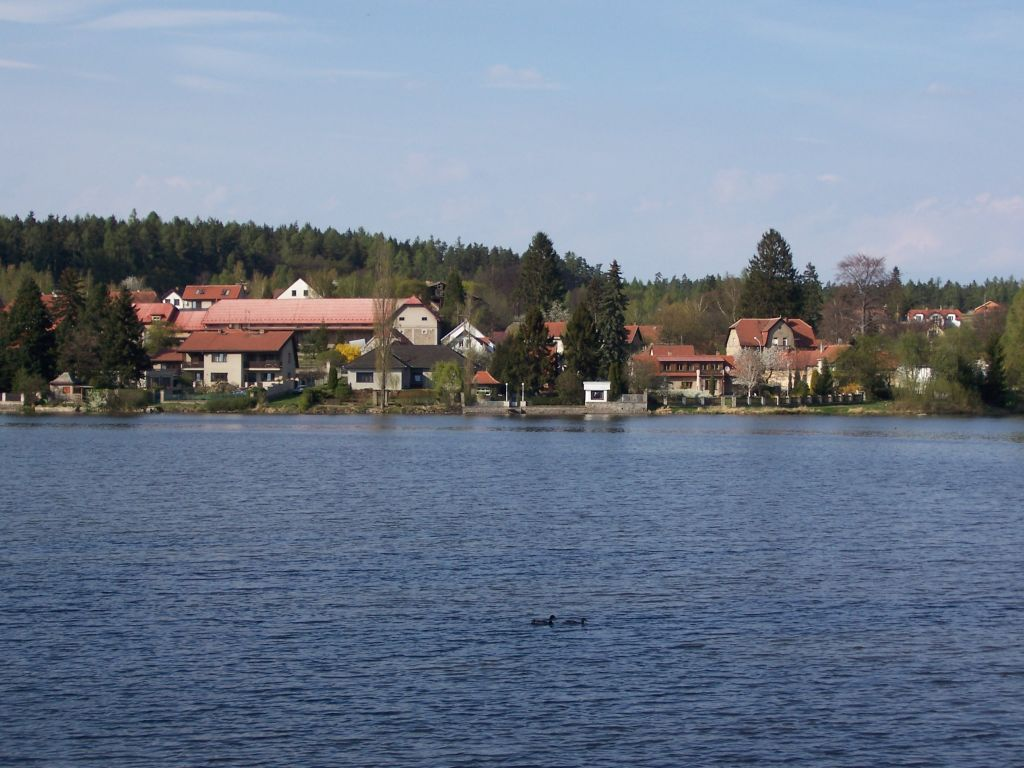
- View towards Jevany across a fishpond

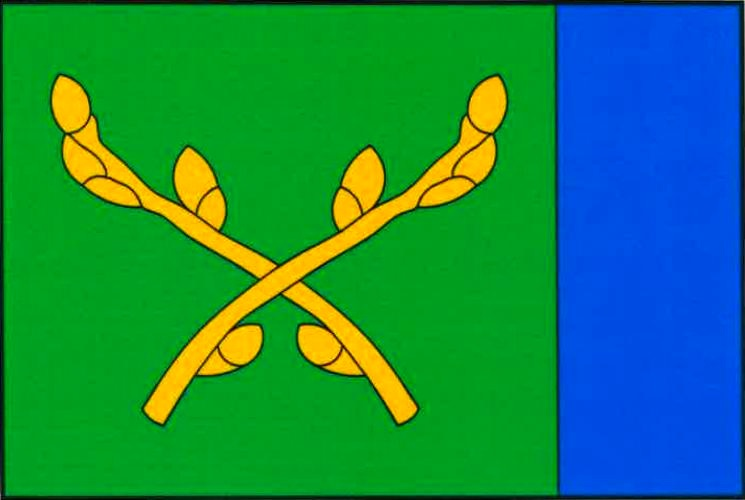
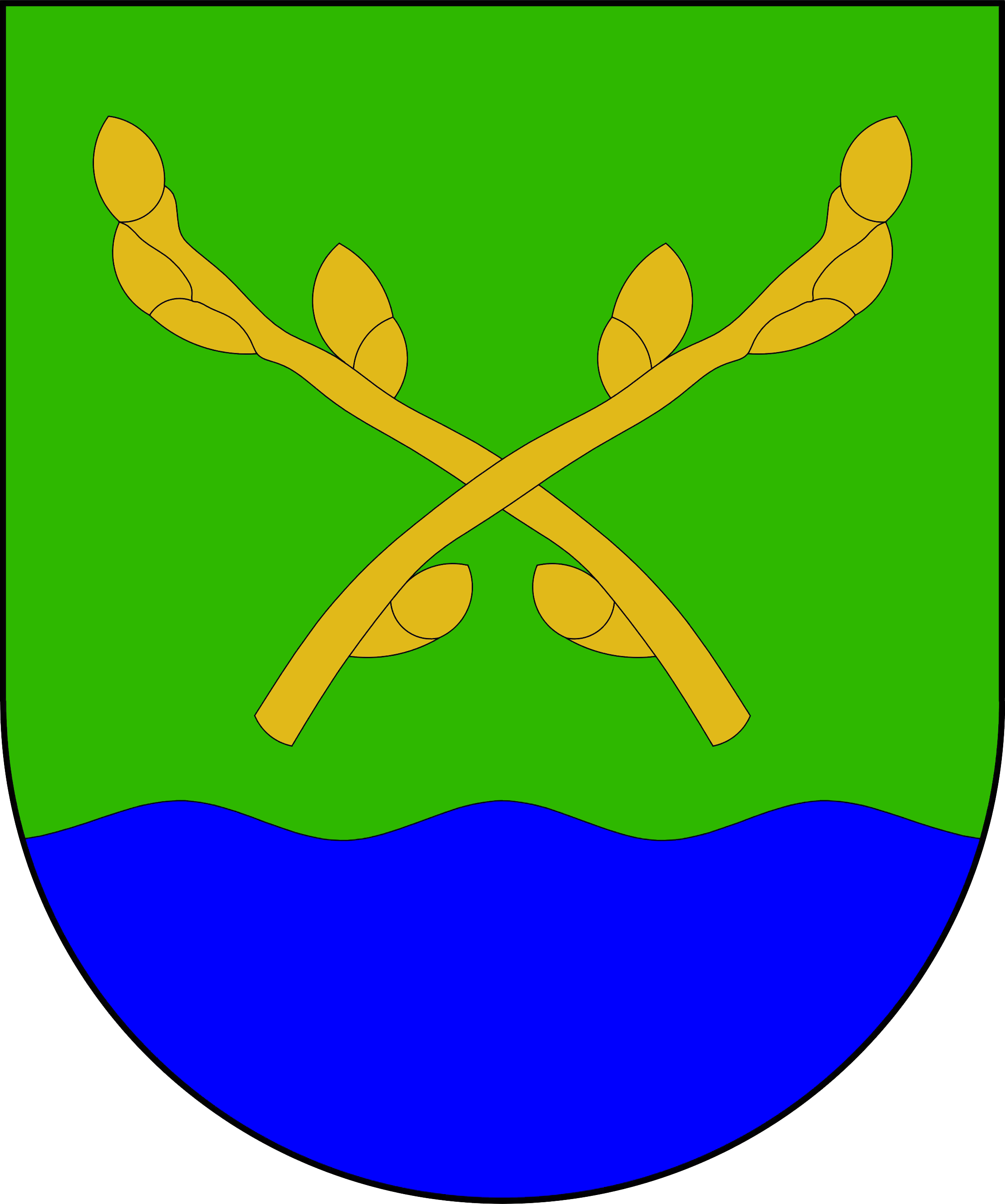
- Flag Coat of arms

- Location in the Czech Republic
- Coordinates: 49°58′14″N 14°48′38″E
- Country: Czech Republic
- Region: Central Bohemian
- District: Prague-East
- First mentioned: 1344

Area
  - Total: 12.92 km^{2} (4.99 sq mi)
- Elevation: 380 m (1,250 ft)

Population (2026-01-01)
  - Total: 856
  - Density: 66.3/km^{2} (172/sq mi)
- Time zone: UTC+1 (CET)
  - Summer (DST): UTC+2 (CEST)
- Postal code: 281 66
- Website: www.obecjevany.cz

Jevany is a municipality and village in Prague-East District in the Central Bohemian Region of the Czech Republic. It has about 900 inhabitants.

== Demographics ==
Historical population
Year	Pop.	±%
1869	315	—
1880	331	+5.1%
1890	276	−16.6%
1900	273	−1.1%
1910	309	+13.2%
1921	270	−12.6%
1930	388	+43.7%
1950	792	+104.1%
1961	724	−8.6%
1970	613	−15.3%
1980	532	−13.2%
1991	461	−13.3%
2001	457	−0.9%
2011	692	+51.4%
2021	825	+19.2%
Source: Censuses
