= Karel Gott =

Czech singer (1939–2019)

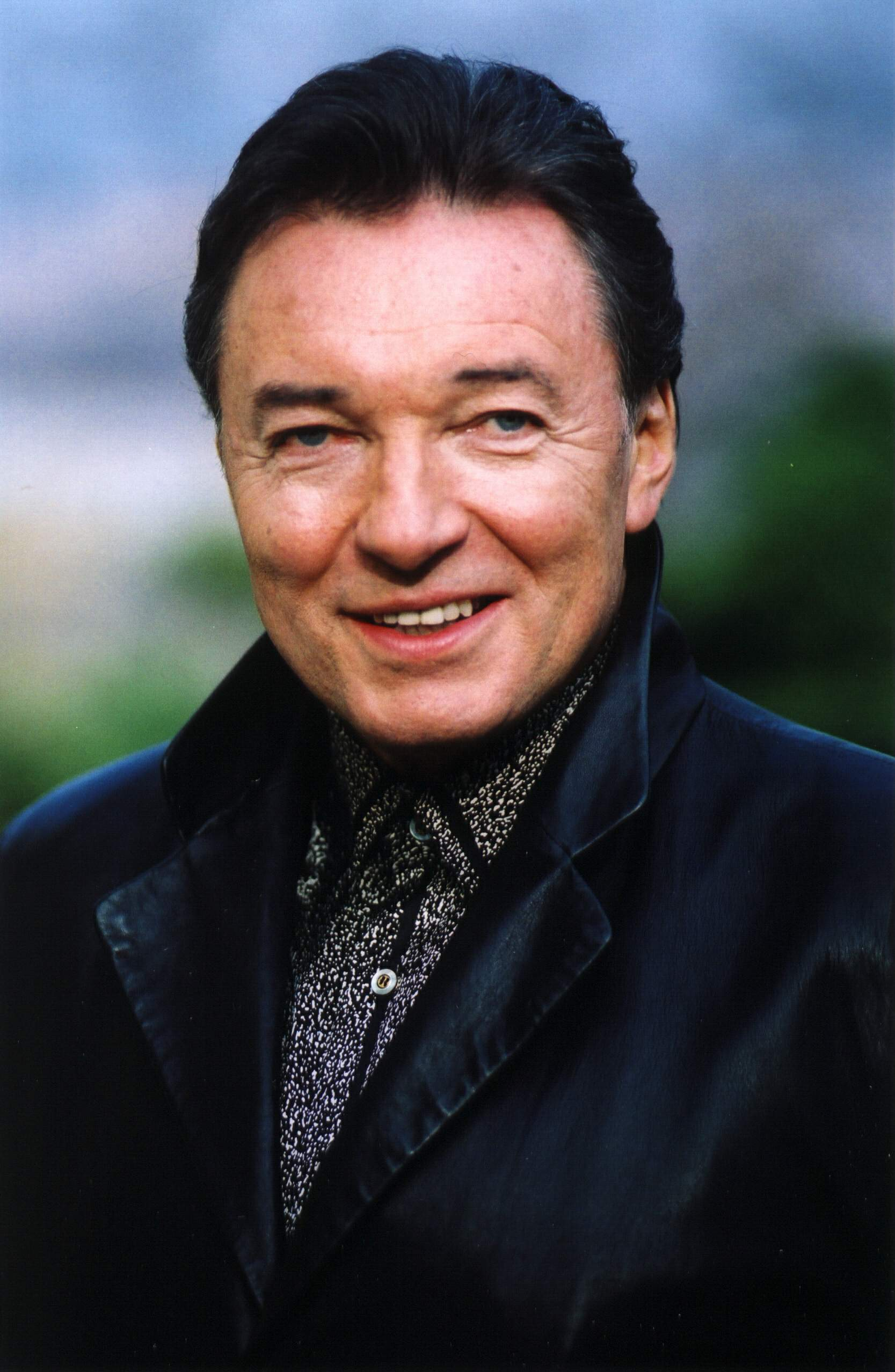
- Gott in 2002

Background information
- Also known as: Golden Voice of Prague (German: Goldene Stimme aus Prag); Sinatra of the East (Czech: Sinatra Východu); Divine Charlie (Czech: Božský Kája)
- Born: 14 July 1939; Plzeň, Protectorate of Bohemia and Moravia
- Died: 1 October 2019 (aged 80) Prague, Czech Republic
- Genres: Pop; rock'n'roll; swing; blues; country; operetta
- Occupations: Singer; songwriter; painter
- Years active: 1958–2019
- Labels: Supraphon; Polydor; Electrola; Melodiya; Amiga
- Website: www.karelgott.com

Karel Gott (14 July 1939 – 1 October 2019) was a Czech singer, considered the most successful male singer in Czechoslovakia and the Czech Republic. He was voted the country's best male singer in the annual Český slavík (Czech Nightingale) national music award 42 times, most recently in 2017.

He achieved considerable success in the USSR and the German-speaking countries, where he was known as "the Golden Voice of Prague", winning the Goldene Stimmgabel award three times (1982, 1984, and 1995).

Over the course of his career he released over 100 albums and 100 compilation albums, and sold an estimated 50–100 million records worldwide, 23 million of them in the German-speaking market, and about 15 million in Czechoslovakia and its successor states, the Czech Republic and Slovakia.

== Early life ==
Gott was born in Plzeň in the Protectorate of Bohemia and Moravia (now the Czech Republic), and lived in Prague from the age of six. Gott initially wanted to study art, but failed the exams at the Academy of Arts, Architecture and Design in Prague (UMPRUM), and so trained as an electrician. On completing his studies, he began working as an electrician, but also became interested in the Prague music scene, especially jazz. He experimented with playing the bass and the guitar, but eventually decided to focus on singing, studying privately. During the 1950s, he occasionally performed as an amateur singer and often participated in competitions.

== Early career ==
In 1958, he was an unsuccessful participant in an amateur singing contest in the Prague Slavonic House, entitled "Looking for New Talent", but succeeded in obtaining his first performance slots at the Vltava Prague Cafe that same year.

In 1960, he decided to become a professional singer. He studied opera at the Prague Conservatory under Konstantin Karenin, a student of the Russian bass Feodor Chaliapin. Knowing of Gott's interest in current musical trends, Karenin instructed him not only in classical Italian pieces but also in popular music. Around this time Gott travelled abroad (to Poland) for the first time, with the Czechoslovak Radio Jazz Orchestra, conducted by Karel Krautgartner.

In 1962, Gott released his first single with Supraphon, a duet with the jazz singer, Vlasta Průchová entitled Až nám bude dvakrát tolik (When we are twice as old). That year Gott appeared in the first Zlatý slavík (Golden Nightingale) national poll, placing 49th with three votes. Shortly afterwards, in 1963, Gott left the conservatory to continue with private singing lessons until 1966.

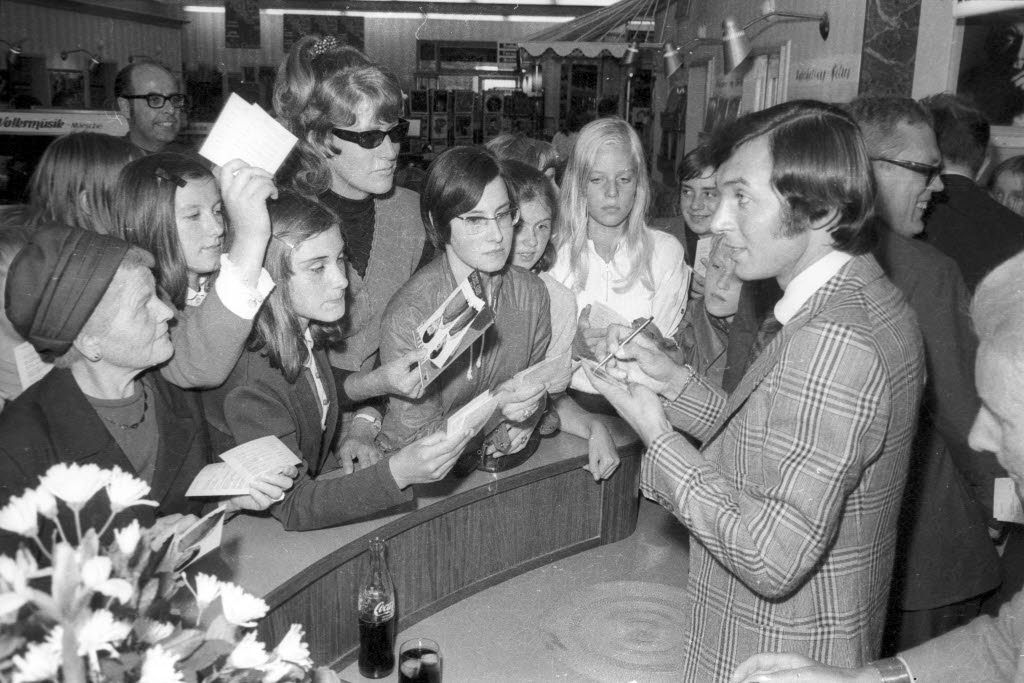
Gott signing autographs in August 1969

In 1963 Gott was offered a place at the recently founded Semafor Theater, which was at the forefront of the emerging Czechoslovak pop music scene, his first significant experience of stage performance. In the same year, he released his first solo single, a Czech recording of Henry Mancini's Moon River, followed by his song Oči sněhem zaváté (Snowdrift Eyes), which became the year's best-selling record. Shortly afterwards, Gott received the first of forty-two Zlatý slavík awards, given to the most popular artist of the year.

"Trezor"
Sample of "Trezor" by Karel Gott, one of the most important songs of the 1960s in Czechoslovakia.

Gott established the Apollo Theater in 1965, along with two colleagues from Semafor: Jiří and Ladislav Štaidl. At this point, he was already well known to the public, appearing in the programs Pilgrimage for Two and Evening Prayer while building a repertoire with his own orchestra. He began composing his own songs, and toured Czechoslovakia and abroad with the Apollo Theater. That year, he released his first album, Karel Gott Sings with Supraphon, followed by an English export album titled The Golden Voice of Prague (Artia-Supraphon).

In 1967, Gott performed at Midem, the music industry trade fair in Cannes, France, where the applause was measured during every concert. Gott's performance surprised observers by reaching a level of 54 (compared to 58 for Tom Jones). Following this event, Gott signed a contract with the Polydor/Deutsche Grammophon Gesellschaft record company, renewing it several times until it became a life contract in 1997. Between 1967 and 2000, Polydor released over 125 albums and 72 singles for Karel Gott in German-speaking countries. Gott represented Austria in the Eurovision Song Contest 1968 with the song Tausend Fenster, finishing in 13th place. In the same year, he spent six months performing nightly at the New Frontier Hotel and Casino in Las Vegas.

== 1970s ==
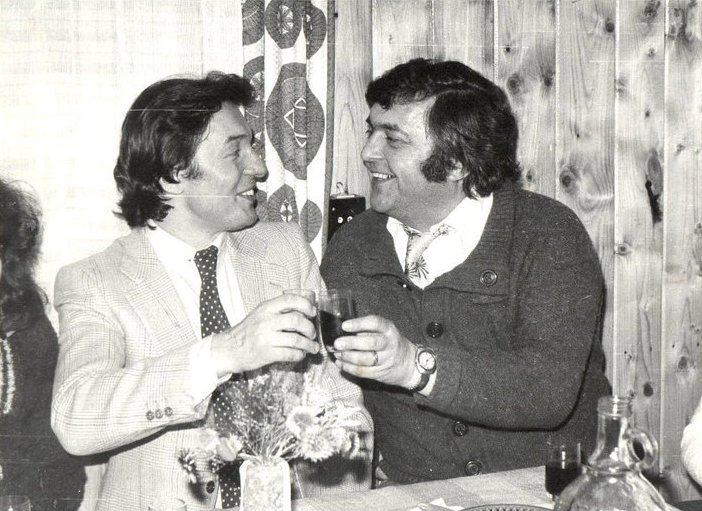
Gott (left) and Moravian composer and musician Jaromír Kaňák

In the 1970s, Gott achieved domestic success and appeared regularly on television, including in a ten-part serial entitled Karel Gott in Slany. In Germany, one of his most successful markets, he celebrated his breakthrough in 1970 with the song Einmal um die ganze Welt and was a star in both West Germany and East Germany. He regularly appeared in television shows like the ZDF-Hitparade. One of his best-known hits was the title song to the anime series Maya the Honey Bee. He recorded the theme in German, later also in Slovak and Czech for the dubbed versions in those languages.

In January 1977, a document known as Charter 77 was created within the dissident circle surrounding Václav Havel, Petr Uhl, and Pavel Kohout. This document highlighted the fact that the Czechoslovak government failed to uphold its commitments to international human rights treaties, such as the Helsinki Accords. In response, the ruling Communist Party of Czechoslovakia (KSČ) organised a signature campaign called The Proclamation of Czechoslovak Committees of Artist Unions: For New Creative Deeds in the Name of Socialism and Peace, unofficially known as the Anticharter. This proclamation expressed loyalty to the communist regime and was signed by more than 7000 artists, including Karel Gott. In the years following the fall of the communist regime in 1989, Gott was often confronted by journalists for this act, however he denied any wrongdoing for many years, saying that he did not know what he was signing. In his posthumously published autobiography My Way to Happiness (2021), Gott expresses regret writing that "[The anticharta] was a manipulation of all the members within the music industry. And I admit that to this day I am deeply troubled that I got so foolishly tricked."

On 3 May 1977, Gott was awarded the title of Merited Artist, and in the following year received the Golden Hat of Cologne, awarded annually to a prominent cultural or social figure. His debut LP in the Soviet Union, released in 1977 by Melodiya, sold over 4.5 million copies, and he remains popular in the former Soviet Union countries.

Karel Gott recorded a cover version of the song All by Myself (on the 1978 LP Romantika) called Kam tenkrát šel můj bratr Jan (Where Did My Brother Jan Go That Time), dedicated to Jan Palach, the student activist who killed himself by self-immolation as a protest against the Soviet occupation of Czechoslovakia in January 1969. The song was recorded in 1977 while Soviet troops were still present in the country.

Towards the end of the decade, Gott began to experiment with other genres outside popular music, including country music and classical compositions, and he appeared at the Fan Fair Country Music Festival in 1979, the first of five appearances.

== 1980s and farewell tour ==
The 1980s were marked by international success for Gott, including the filming of the musical In the Track of Bel Canto in Italy in 1981, with an accompanying German-Italian album, and a duet performance with Sofia Rotaru in the Soviet Union. In 1983, Gott was awarded the Gold Medal of Hermann Löns in Munich, Germany, for his role in the development of German traditional song. On 30 April 1985, he was awarded the title of National Artist for exceptional artistic contributions. In 1986, to mark 20 years with the company, he received Polydor's Golden Needle, previously only awarded to Leonard Bernstein and Herbert von Karajan. In March 1991 he was the first artist inducted into the Hall of Fame of the Academy of Popular Music, and he was awarded the Supraphon Diamond Record Award on 8 September 1992, in recognition of record sales of 13 million in Czechoslovakia.

In 1990, Gott announced the end of his career and arranged a long farewell tour. However, the success of the tour led him to retract his decision. In 1993, he established an artistic agency, GOJA, with František Janeček, which now produces Gott's records and manages his artistic activities.

== Comeback and later career ==
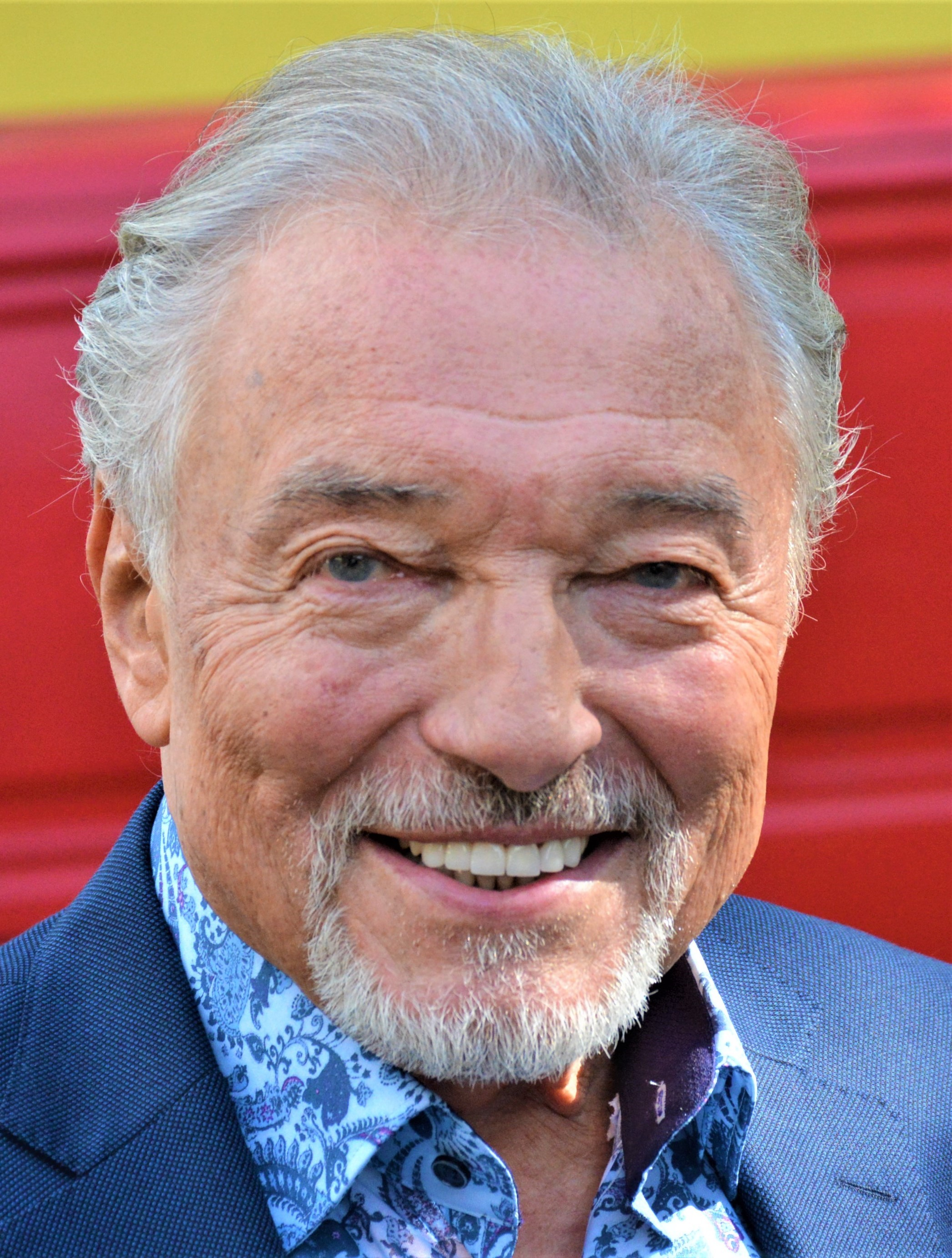
Gott in 2018

In 1996, following renewed public interest in his career, Gott again won the Český slavík (Czech Nightingale), and won the accolade every year since, with the exception of 1998 and 2012. He remained popular in a number of countries and performed widely outside the Czech Republic. On 29 September 2000 he played a concert at Carnegie Hall in New York City.

In 2008, he appeared on Bushido's album Heavy Metal Payback, performing a duet called "Für immer jung", a cover of "Forever Young" by Alphaville.

In 2009 he was awarded a Distinguished Merit Medal by the Czech state.

His German lyricist from 2001 was Filip Albrecht, who wrote over 20 songs for him. In May 2014 Gott released his autobiography Zwischen zwei Welten (Between two worlds).

In May 2019, only months before he died, Gott released his last song and music video - a duet with his daughter Charlotte entitled "Srdce nehasnou" (Hearts don't fade). At the time of release, Gott's health issues were kept secret from the public, but after Gott died, songwriter Richard Krajčo said that he had been asked to write the duet in a very short time.

== Personal life ==
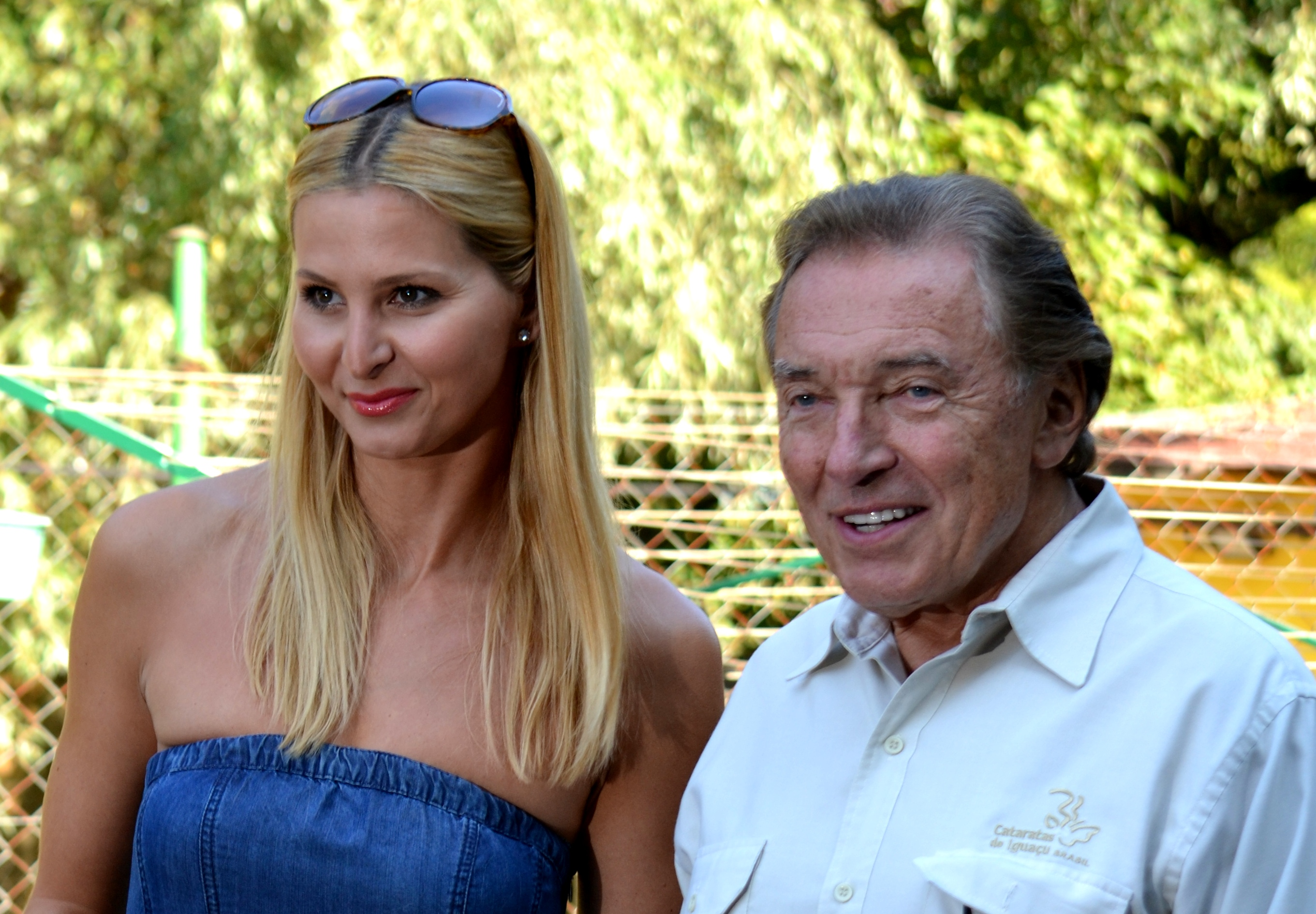
Gott with his wife Ivana in 2012

He had two daughters (Dominika and Lucie) from different former relationships. He married his last wife, Ivana Macháčková, in January 2008 in Las Vegas, and they had two daughters, Charlotte (born in April 2006) and Nelly (born in May 2008).

During the 1990s, Gott began to focus on painting. The first exhibition of his paintings took place in 1992, at the Prague Christ Child Gallery, and his work was since exhibited in Berlin, Moscow, Munich, Cologne, Vienna, and Bratislava.

== Health problems and death ==
In October 2015, Gott was diagnosed with cancer of the lymph nodes. On 18 March 2016, it was reported in the media that he had beaten cancer, but in September 2019, he developed acute leukemia, due to which he cancelled all upcoming appearances and started outpatient treatment. He died at around 11:30 pm on 1 October 2019 at his home in Bertramka, aged 80, with his family around him, and his death was reported the following morning.

All major television stations in the Czech Republic featured breaking news announcements and commemorative programs in their schedules, and Czech Radio and Radio Impuls also adapted their scheduled broadcasts. At an extraordinary meeting on 2 October, the government approved a state funeral and declared the day of the funeral a national day of mourning. A day later, Prime Minister Andrej Babiš withdrew the proposal for a state funeral, saying that it should only be a funeral with state honours, as in the case of Otakar Motejl in 2010. At the presidential chateau in Lány, the Presidential flags were flown at half-mast as a sign of mourning, but according to the former proto-logger Jindřich Forejt, this violated the law on the use of state symbols of the Czech Republic.

A public commemorative ceremony was held at 8am on Friday, 11 October 2019, in Prague's Žofín Palace. Gott's fans travelled from around the Czech Republic and Germany and waited for several hours in a five-kilometre queue to the palace. The ceremony ended at midnight, by which time around 49,000 mourners had paid respects at his coffin. The funeral mass with state honours was held at Saint Vitus Cathedral on Saturday, 12 October, presided over by the Archbishop of Prague, Cardinal Dominik Duka. A day of national mourning was declared on the same day. The requiem guests included many famous Czech singers, actors, and sportsmen, as well as President Miloš Zeman and Prime Minister Babiš.

== See also ==
- Neznámy pár – duo with Marika Gombitová
- Hrajme píseň – trio with Marika Gombitová and Josef Laufer

Preceded by Peter Horton; 1967	Austria in the Eurovision Song Contest; 1968	Succeeded by Marianne Mendt; 1971
