= Klein Vision AirCar =

Prototype flying car

The Klein Vision AirCar is a two-seat flying car designed by Štefan Klein and made in Slovakia. It was type certified as an aircraft in January 2022.

== Design and development ==
Slovak designer Professor Štefan Klein began working on flying cars in the late 1980s. Having developed the AeroMobil, he left the company to develop a new idea as the AirCar, and set up Klein Vision with colleague Anton Zajac.

The main fuselage (body) of the AirCar doubles as a two-seat road car with four large road wheels. Styled like a sports coupe, it contributes 30-40 percent of the total lift when in the air. For flight it is fitted with foldout wings and extending tailbooms carrying a high tail. A pusher propeller is permanently installed between the fuselage and tail, and a safety parachute is installed. Construction is primarily a semi-monocoque of carbon fibre composite over a steel subframe. Over 20 programmable servo motors are used to perform the transition between road and air configurations. When on the road, the retracted tail surface creates a downforce similar to conventional rear aerofoils.

Power is provided by a 1.6 litre BMW road car engine, running on automotive petrol or gasoline and delivering 104 kilowatts (139 hp).

The prototype AirCar is of comparable length to a Mercedes S-Class saloon, at 5.2 metres (17 ft 1 in), and around 2 cm (0.79 in) narrower. Overall weight is 1,100 kilograms (2,400 lb).

A second, pre-production prototype is expected to have a monocoque fuselage with a more powerful 220 kilowatts (300 hp) engine.

The design was type certified as an aircraft in January 2022 in Slovakia. It also needs approval as a road vehicle before it can be used as such.

== Performance ==
The prototype takes off at around 120 kilometres per hour (75 mph), after a run of 300 metres (980 ft). Cruising speed in the air is said to be 170 kilometres per hour (92 kn). Range is estimated as 1,000 kilometres (620 mi), at an altitude of 2,500 metres (8,200 ft). The current version of the car can reach altitudes of 4,572 metres (15,000 ft). It is said to take two minutes and 15 seconds to transform from car into aircraft.

== Operational history ==
The prototype first flew on 22 or 27 October 2020. In June 2021, the prototype carried out a 35-minute flight between Nitra and Bratislava airports. Later, on April 23, 2024, the prototype flew with French musician, Jean-Michel Jarre.

== See also ==
Aircraft of comparable role, configuration, and era

- AeroMobil s.r.o. AeroMobil
- PAL-V - roadable autogyro
- Terrafugia Transition - sports coupe with folding wings
