= Tampier Avion-Automobile =

French roadable aircraft

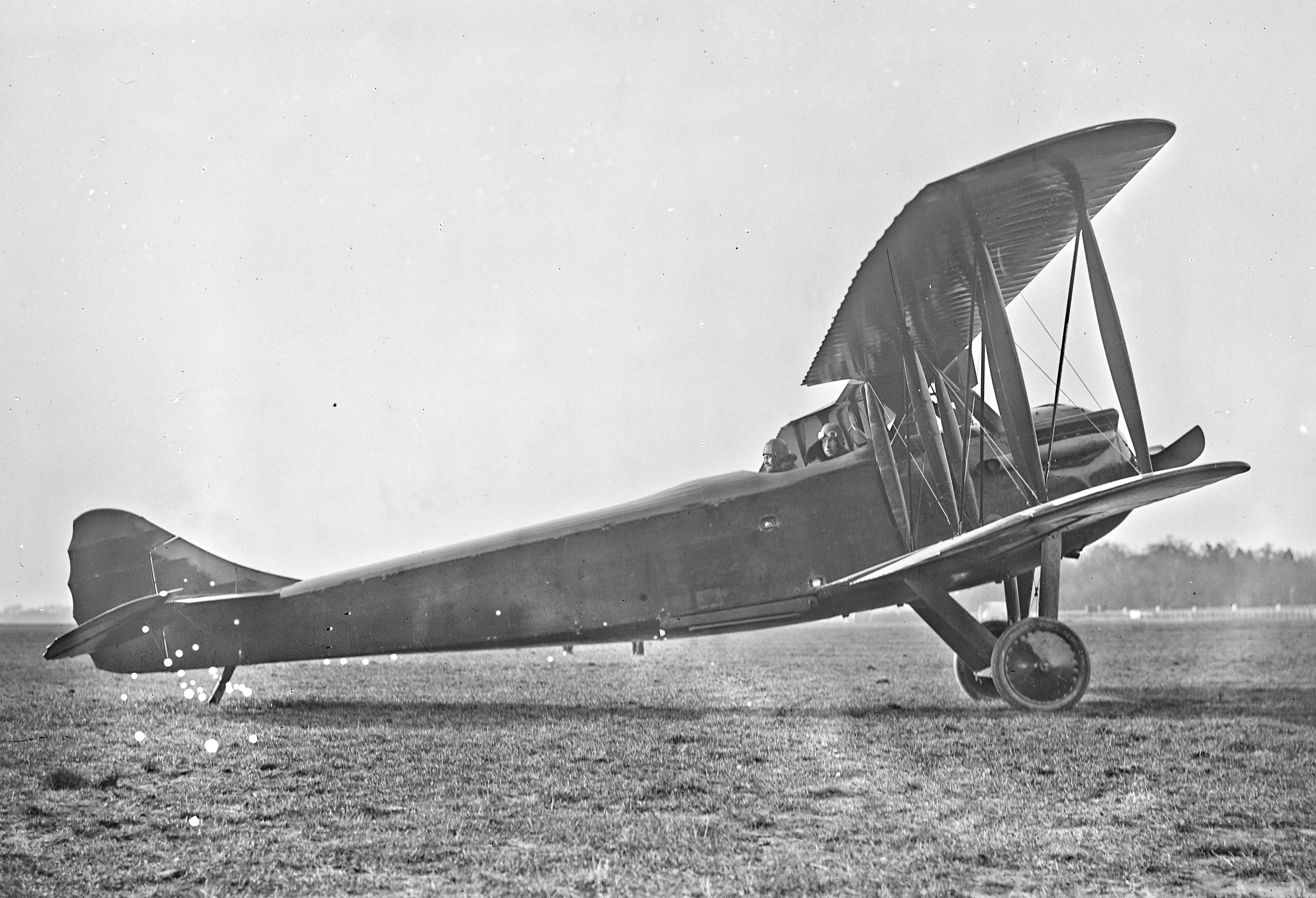

General information
- Type: Roadable aircraft
- National origin: France
- Designer: and builder, René Tampier
- Number built: 2

History
- First flight: 1921

The Tampier Avion-Automobile was a French roadable aircraft designed and built by René Tampier in 1921. Only two were built.

In 1921 René Tampier tackled the problem of designing an aircraft that was self-propelled and steerable on roads by including a second, low-powered engine driving the main landing wheels through a standard car-type transmission. The roadwheels were completed with a retractable pair nearer the tail. These were steerable, so on the road the Tampier Avion-Automobile, with its wings and tailplane folded, travelled tail first.

== Design and development ==
Apart from its roadworthy landing gear the Avion-Automobile was a largely conventional two bay biplane, with thin-section, two-spar wings mounted without stagger, sweep or dihedral. Though upper and lower wings had equal spans the lower one had a narrower chord so that it could be folded against the fuselage, at the same time allowing the trailing edges of the upper wings to meet above the fuselage. Only the lower wings carried ailerons. Each bay was defined by pairs of parallel, vertical interplane struts, with an extra pair at the inner end of the folding sections.

In aircraft configuration the Avion-Automobile was powered by a 220 kW (300 hp) Hispano-Suiza 8F water-cooled V8 engine in the nose. The 7.5 kW (10 hp) four-cylinder, 500 cm^{3} (31 cu in) ancillary engine for road use, which shared the flight engine's water-cooling and radiator, was behind and below it, so to help keep the centre of gravity (c.g.) over mid-chord the honeycomb radiator was mounted centrally on the leading edge of the upper wing. Behind the engine the rectangular section fuselage was flat-sided with the tailplane on top and braced from below by a pair of parallel struts on each side. All three fixed tail surfaces were triangular and carried balanced control surfaces.

As an aircraft, the Avion-Automobile's tailskid undercarriage was conventional, with mainwheels on an axle supported at each end by a faired V-strut. On the ground, they were driven by the ancillary engine via a car-type four-speed plus reverse gearbox, clutch and differential. The second set of wheels were retracted into the rear fuselage in flight, moving forward to keep the c.g. under the wings. After they were lowered on the ground for road use they were steered with the rudder pedals, the Avion-Automobile travelling tail first. Because of the change in direction of travel between flight and road configuration, its open cockpit placed pilot and driver facing each other, each equipped with appropriate controls. As an automobile, the Tampier was 2.45 m (8 ft 0 in) wide and 8.50 m (27 ft 11 in) long, with a wheel track of 1.45 m (4 ft 9 in).

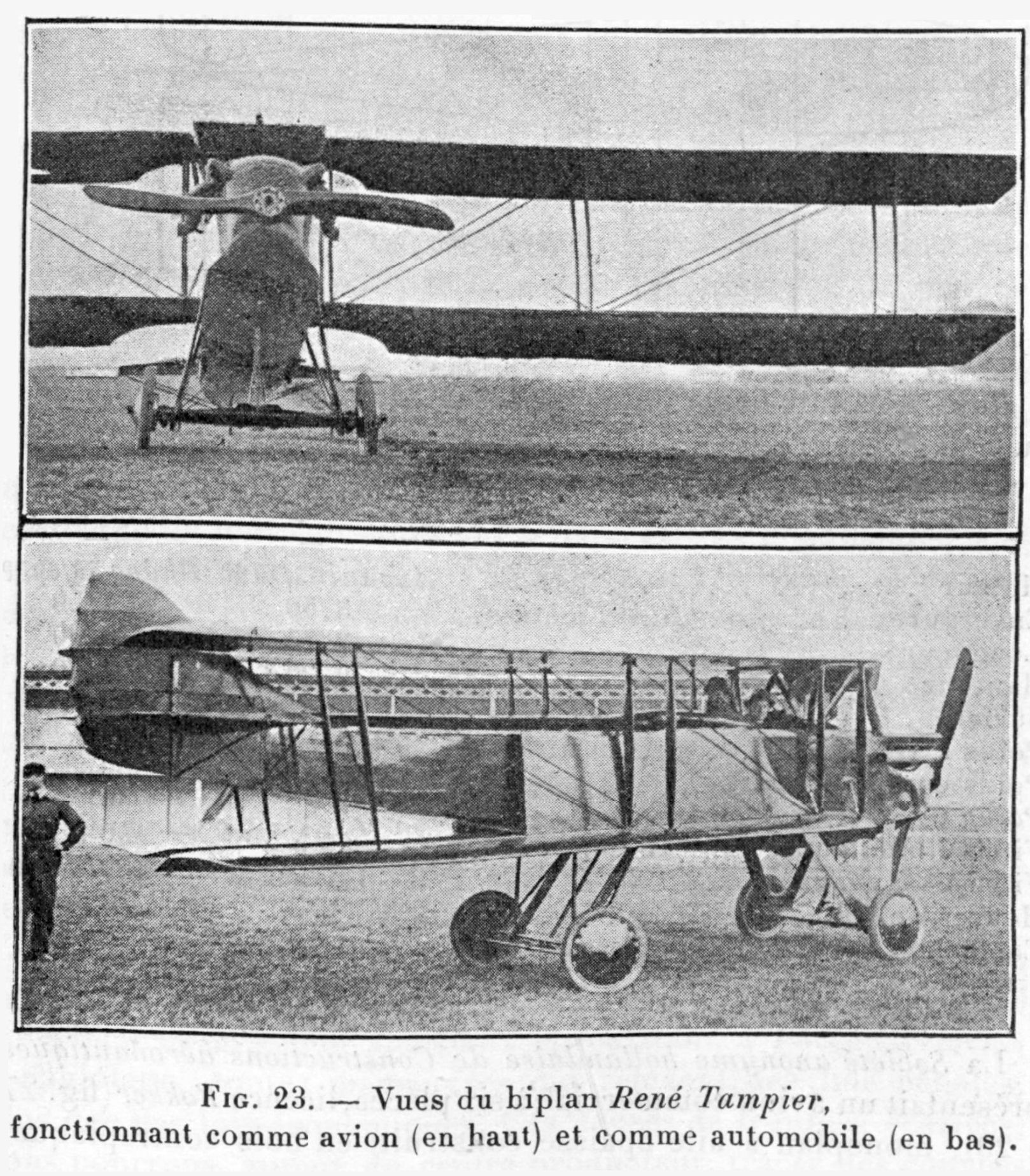
Tampier Avion-Automobile in flying (top) and driving (bottom) configuration. Photo from Le Génie Civil December 3, 1921

In November 1921 two examples of the Avion-Automobile were displayed at the seventh Salon de l'Aéronautique, the only aircraft to arrive by road and drive onto their display stands. By the time of the show the Tampiers had flown satisfactorily and had also done many miles on the road, with a maximum speed of about 25 mph (40 km/h), though a later report of a trip gives top speed of 25–30 km/h (16–19 mph) and only 18 km/h (11 mph) on poor surfaces. It was also at the Bourget lightplane meeting in May 1922, demonstrating its good ground handling.

The ability to manoeuvre on the ground and travel along roads came with the penalty of carrying largely dead weight in the air. Tampier saw the Avion-Automobile more as a demonstration of a system that would come into its own on large aircraft, where the auxiliary motor's weight would be a smaller fraction of the total. Ground mobility independent of the flight engine would make it easier to return an airliner that had force-landed in a field with engine problems to an aerodrome equipped for repair work. Similarly, if a transport was forced to land away from its fog-bound destination, it could complete its journey by road. Flight remarked in 1922 that "it is not inconceivable that in years to come such arrangements will be found on most commercial machines."

== Specifications ==
Data from Les Ailes, January 1922

General characteristics

- Crew: One
- Capacity: one passenger
- Length: 8.50 m (27 ft 11 in)
- Wingspan: 13 m (42 ft 8 in)
- Height: 2.80 m (9 ft 2 in)
- Wing area: 31 m^{2} (330 sq ft)
- Gross weight: 1,300 kg (2,866 lb)
- Powerplant: 1 × Hispano-Suiza 8F , 220 kW (300 hp)
- Powerplant: 1 × Unknown water-cooled, 4-cylinder, 500 cm^{3} (31 cu in), 7.5 kW (10 hp) for on-road use

Performance

- Maximum speed: 170 km/h (110 mph, 92 kn) approximately
- Wing loading: 42 kg/m^{2} (8.6 lb/sq ft)
- Power/mass: 0.31 kW/kg (0.1 hp/lb)
