= PD2 =

PD2, Pd2 or PD-2 may refer to:

- PD2, a model of the Leyland Titan double-decker bus
- PD2, a variant of the Plane Driven PD-1 roadable aircraft
- Pd2, Polish State Railways classification of Prussian S 4 steam locomotive
- Ukrspecsystems PD-2, a Ukrainian unmanned aerial vehicle
- PAF1, a human gene also called PD2

== See also ==
- North American blizzard of 2003, also known as the Presidents' Day Storm II or "PDII"
- Payday 2, a cooperative first-person shooter video game
- The Princess Diaries 2: Royal Engagement, a 2004 American romantic comedy film
