= SpnKiX =

This article reads like an advertisement. To meet Wikipedia's quality standards and comply with Wikipedia's neutral point of view policy, it may require substantial cleanup. (November 2013)

SpnKiX is a pair of motorised shoes with wheels and wireless handheld remote control developed by a small firm, 'Action Inc' to assist pedestrians reach their destinations faster.

It's the brainchild of Peter Treadway, who is also the product designer, inventor and co-founder. In his own words, Flying cars and Jet packs inspired this concept; also, the trouble he had in finding parking in Los Angeles, California led him to conceive the basic idea.

Each shoe consists of a frame made out of reinforced nylon. All hardware and electronics including motor, motor controller and battery pack are integrated into the frame. A wireless handheld remote control adjusts the speed to go up to 10 miles per hour. Rechargeable lithium batteries charged for 2 to 3 hours are good for 2 to 3 miles of commuting.

== Works this way ==
SpnKiX are battery powered and electric roller skates to be strapped on to each shoe. Each pack on the foot has a built-in motor and battery pack, remote-controlled by a wireless device in the hand that controls both skates at once.
