= Alef Aeronautics =

American flying car company

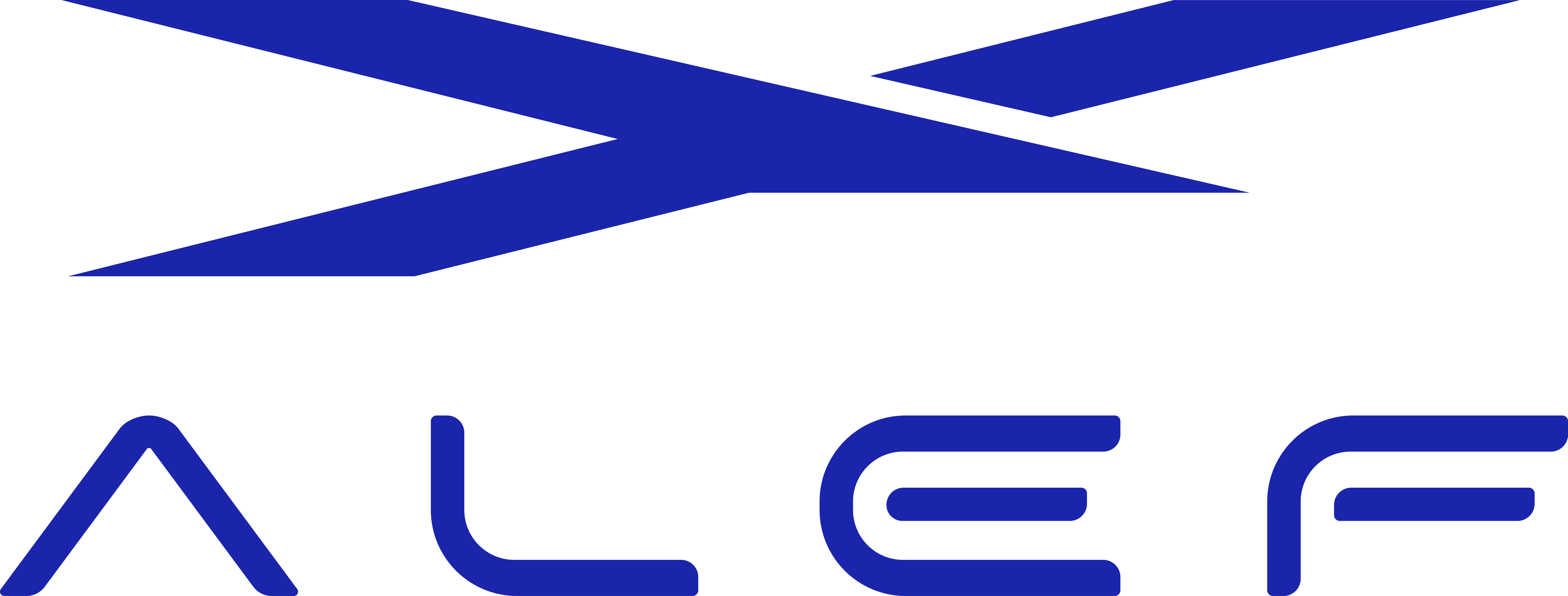
- Type: Private
- Industry: Automotive
- Founded: April 6, 2015; 11 years ago
- Founders: Jim Dukhovny, Constantine Kisly, Pavel Markin, Oleg Petrov
- Headquarters: San Mateo, California, U.S.
- Key people: Jim Dukhovny (CEO); Constantine Kisly (VP); Pavel Markin; Oleg Petrov (VP)
- Products: Flying car
- Website: alef.aero

Alef Aeronautics is an automotive and aviation company based in the United States. Since 2015, it has been developing and promoting a proposed flying car intended to take off vertically and tilt sideways to fly like a biplane.

== History ==
Alef Aeronautics is an American company founded on April 6, 2015, by Jim Dukhovny, Constantine Kisly, Pavel Markin and Oleg Petrov.

The company initially relied on financing by its founders. It obtained further seed investment from Draper Associates in 2017, followed by further investment rounds in 2018 and 2020. Notable investors include Draper B1, Impact Venture Capital, Strong VC, and Luis Scola.

== Model A flying car ==
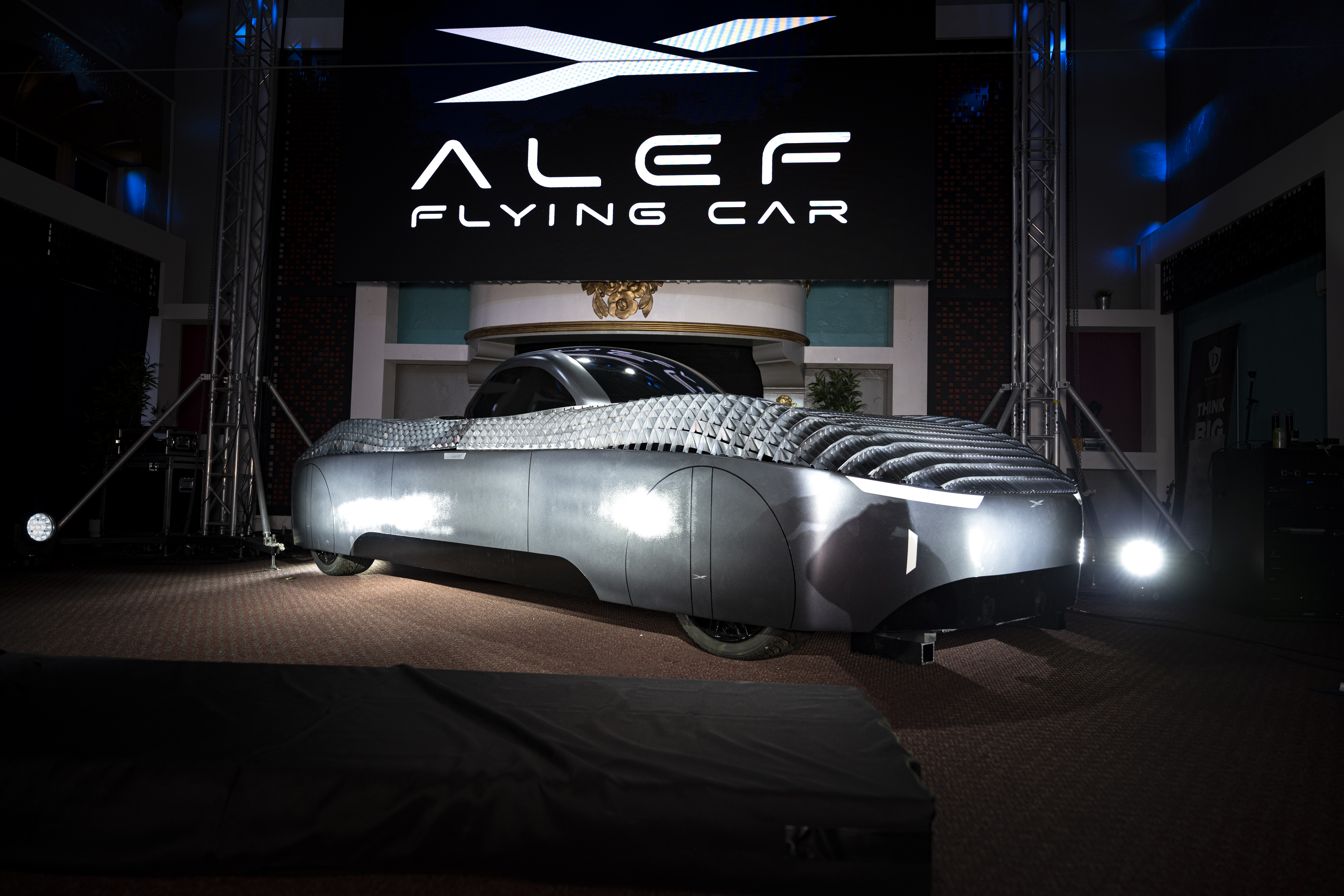
Model A full-scale mock-up

The Alef Model A is a proposed novel design for a flying car. It is intended as a personal ground vehicle which would also be capable of vertical takeoff and forward flight. Envisaged as all-electric (eVTOL), type, the planned flight range is approximately 110 miles (180 km), and almost twice that at 200 miles (320 km) as a ground vehicle.

The Alef design utilizes hub motors for land travel, while for flight it incorporates eight motor-controller-propeller systems providing distributed electric propulsion, covered by a continuous mesh upper surface to allow airflow during vertical flight.

The Model A employs an unusual transition between vertical and forward flight modes. Once airborne, the vehicle tilts sideways, such that the right and left sides of the car become the top and bottom wings of a biplane for forward flight. At the same time, the spherical cabin rotates and swivels sideways so that the occupants are still sitting upright and facing forward in the direction of travel.

Alef intends to have the Model A certified for road use as a "low speed vehicle", limited to 25 miles per hour.

In February 2025, Alef released a video of a concept version of its flying car taking off vertically and then flying over another vehicle.

It was reported in December 2025 that production of the Model A Ultralight had begun, with delivery to be made to a few early customers to allow real-world testing under controlled conditions.

Another video, released by the company in October 2026, showed its car flying over several vehicles, including a Tesla Roadster and a Tesla Cybertruck.
