= Skroback Roadable Airplane =

General information
- Type: Roadable aircraft
- National origin: United States of America
- Designer: Frank E. Skroback

History
- Manufactured: 1
- Introduction date: 1934

The Skroback Roadable Airplane was an early attempt to produce a roadable airplane. To keep the aircraft within a reasonable width for driving with fixed wings, the inventor used many wing surfaces along the length of the vehicle.

== Design and development ==
Frank E. Skroback was an inventor with several patents. His concept of a roadable started with sketches in 1927. The vehicle was inspired by the French designs of Henri Mignet and his Flying Flea. The prototype was completed in 1934.

The finished prototype used 3 pairs of short seven foot span biplane wings positioned at the front, middle and rear of the vehicle. A small set of rudders on the rear wing assembly could be operated differentially to provide yaw and roll in flight. The vehicle was powered by a tractor configuration Continental A-40 engine driving a propeller. The "body" or fuselage, used spruce stringers, was fabric covered and resembled a dirigible in shape. The wheels were positioned in the conventional taildragger configuration.

== Operational history ==
Initial tests in 1945 proved the vehicle lacked rudder authority on the ground. It was placed in storage, then work commenced again in 1957. The vehicle was road driven in Syracuse, New York and Maine. The Willowbrook Village Museum in Newfield, Maine had the vehicle in its collection, but later considered it out of the museum's scope. It was offered by auction in Atlanta, Georgia in 2010, with a sale price of $66,175.

== Specifications (Skroback Roadable Airplane) ==
Data from Sport Aviation

General characteristics

- Capacity: 1
- Length: 21 ft (6.4 m)
- Wingspan: 7 ft (2.1 m)
- Wing area: 123 sq ft (11.4 m^{2})
- Empty weight: 1,000 lb (454 kg)
- Powerplant: 1 × Continental A-40 , 37 hp (28 kW)

Performance
