= PAL-V =

Dutch aircraft manufacturer

PAL-V International B.V.
- Industry: Aircraft manufacturer
- Founded: 2001
- Headquarters: Raamsdonksveer, Netherlands
- Products: PAL-V Liberty
- Website: www.pal-v.com

PAL-V (Personal Air and Land Vehicle) is a Dutch company that is involved in the development of a commercial flying car, the PAL-V Liberty. It is a compact two-person aircraft that can travel on public roads.
