= Doroni Aerospace =

American eVTOL aircraft developer

- Type: Private
- Industry: Aerospace; Electric aircraft; Urban air mobility
- Founded: January 1, 2017; 9 years ago
- Founder: Doron Merdinger
- Headquarters: Pompano Beach, Florida, United States
- Area served: United States
- Products: Doroni H1 eVTOL
- Website: doroni.io

Doroni Aerospace is an American aerospace company specializing in electric vertical takeoff and landing (eVTOL) technology. The company was founded in 2017 by Doron Merdinger and is based in Dania Beach, Florida.

== History ==
The company was founded by Doron Merdinger, who studied microelectronics and computer science before earning a BBA at United States International University and an MBA at New York University Stern School of Business.

Development began in 2017 with the “Y” prototype, followed by the “X” in March 2018 and the finalized H1 in 2021. Construction of the H1 prototype completed in January 2023. FAA-approved test flights took place later that year.

The company raised over $50 million via equity crowdfunding and institutional investment. In September 2026, Doroni announced an engineering partnership with TLG Aerospace covering product design, ground testing, and alignment with FAA airworthiness requirements.

== Products and services ==
The H1-X is a two-seat eVTOL capable of 120 miles per hour, a 25-minute recharge on a standard EV charger, joystick controls, autonomous navigation, anti-collision sensors, and a full-vehicle ballistic parachute. The company reported it is targeting the FAA's MOSAIC light-sport aircraft pathway which requires operators to secure a Sport Pilot Certificate and estimates about 25 hours of training.

== Commercial strategy ==
Direct sales target first responders and law enforcement, with consumer retail showrooms, pop-up events, and online platforms.

Doroni unveiled a full-scale showroom model of the H1-X at an event at its headquarters, at which time it reported more than 600 pre-orders.

== Future developments ==
The company is pursuing FAA Light Sport Aircraft certification for commercial availability and has advised it plans to begin initial deliveries in 2028, with planned manufacturing in Saudi Arabia via Innovation Wings Industries.
