= Audi Pop.Up Next =

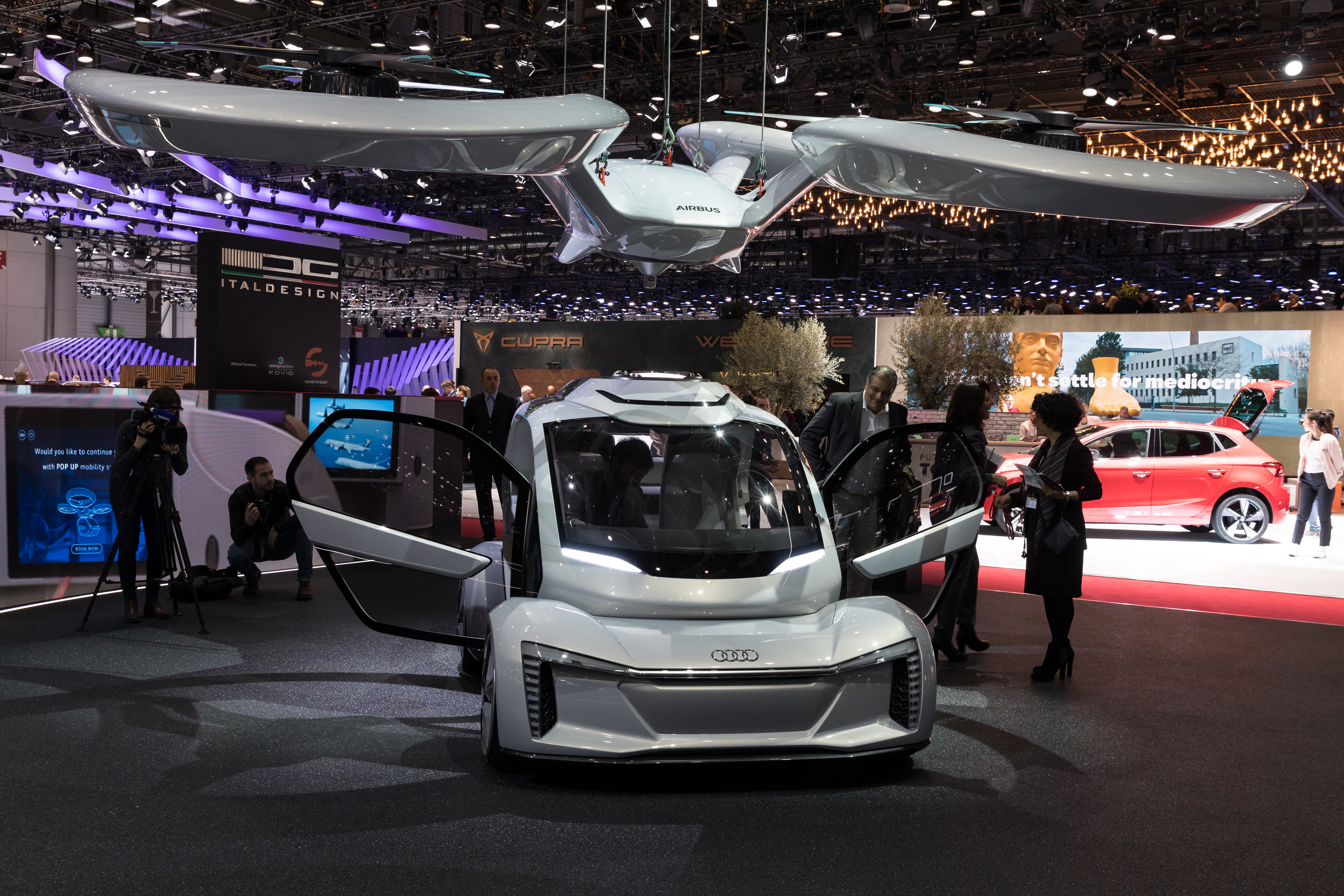

Overview
- Manufacturer: Audi AG, Airbus, Italdesign
- Model years: 2018

Body and chassis
- Class: Flying car; Electric car
- Body style: 2-door

The Audi Pop.Up Next is a conceptual unmanned flying electric vehicle that can move both on the ground and through the air of the joint development of the German automaker Audi AG, the Airbus company, and the design company Italdesign Giugiaro. It was first presented at the Geneva Motor Show in 2018.

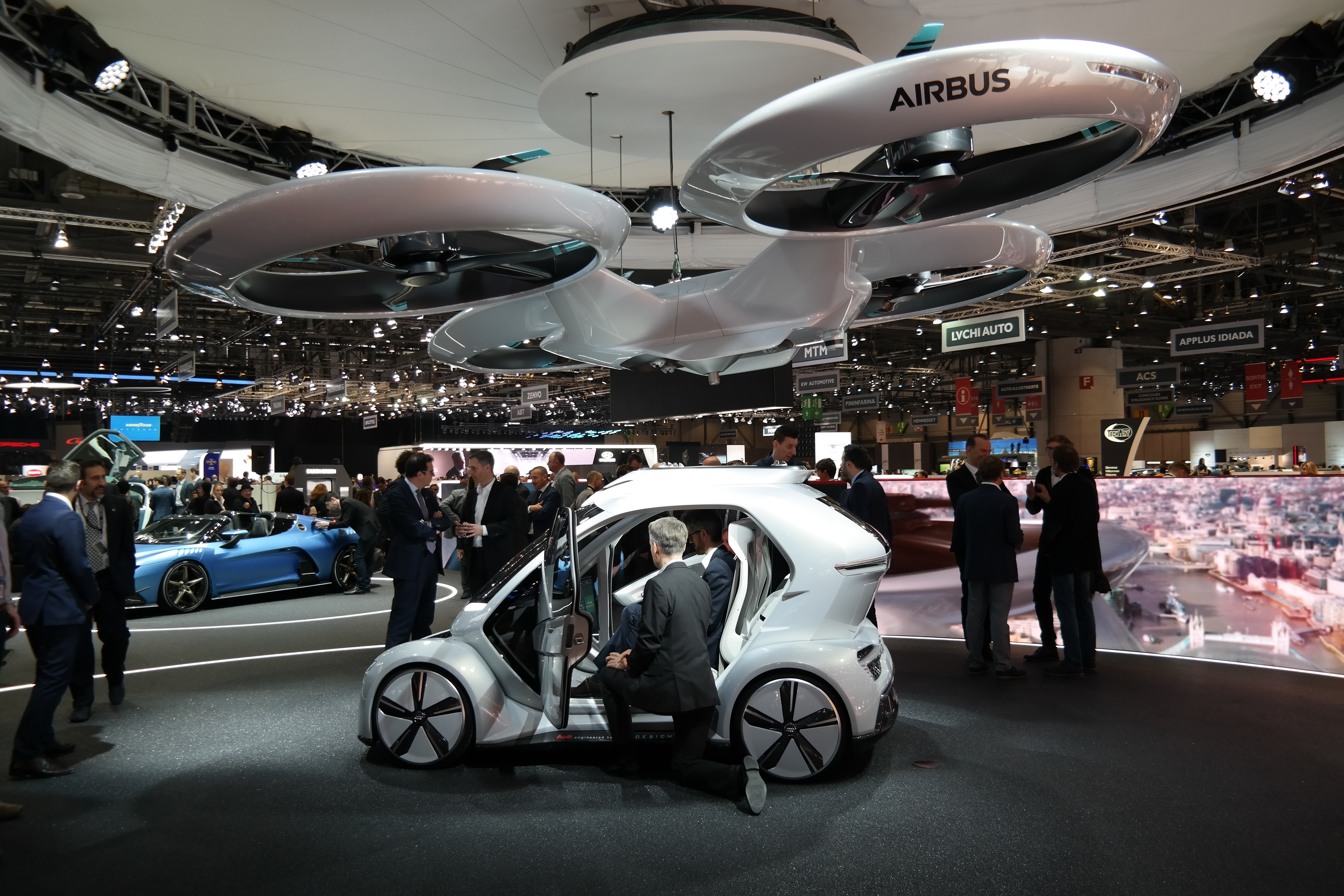
Audi Pop.Up Next at the Geneva Motor Show 2018

== See also ==
- Airbus CityAirbus
- Audi Aicon
- Audi e-tron family
