= SkyRider X2R =

A 1/4th scale SkyRider body prototype

The SkyRider X2R was a project for flying car design developed by Macro Industries. The SkyRider incorporates tough, lightweight composites for reduced structural weight, it utilizes four-ducted fans with wings to generate lift and maintain flight and uses control systems and onboard computers to generate a travel path to reach a destination given by voice commands.

While still in a prototype phase, the SkyRider is estimated to cost between $500,000 and $1 million, although price is expected to drop to $50,000 if it reaches mass production. In the early 2000s, Macro Industries planned but failed to have an operational prototype by 2005. In 2010, Macro Industries designed and proposed a militarized version of its SkyRider for the DARPA Transformer program. This has not been built as of July 2017

== Specifications ==
=== General characteristics ===
- Length: 4.3 m (14 ft)
- Width: 3.7 m (12 ft)
- Engines: 1 @ 520 kW (700 hp)
- Electric drive
- Ducted fans: 4
- Person capacity: 2 @ 90 kg (200 lb)
- Load capacity: 140 kg (300 lb)
- Fuel capacity: 380 L or 83 imp gal or 100 US gal
- Range: (50power) 1,500 km or 920 mi or 800 nmi
- Conventional takeoff roll: 500 ft (150 m)
- VTOL take off roll: 0 ft (0 m)
- Noise level: 40 dBA @ 100 ft (30 m)

=== Theoretical Performance ===
- Cruise speed: (75power) 463 km/h (288 mph)
- Maximum speed: 604 km/h (375 mph)
- Rate of climb: 4,000 ft (1,200 m) per minute
- Service ceiling: 25,000 ft (7,600 m)
