= Lebouder Autoplane =

Autoplane

General information
- Type: Two seat roadable aircraft
- National origin: France
- Designer: Robert Lebouder
- Number built: 1

History
- First flight: before July 1973
- Retired: 1977

The Lebouder Autoplane was a French amateur built modular roadable aircraft, with a car-like component that could be separated from its aeronautical parts. The sole Autoplane flew and drove successfully in the early 1970s.

== Design and development ==
From a distance or in flight, the two seat Autoplane appeared to be a conventional, single engined, high wing braced monoplane with a fixed tail wheel undercarriage. On the ground the front part of the fuselage was seen to be a seriously modified Vespa 400 micro-car, a common, small, four wheeled, open top two seater powered by an 13 kW (18 hp) motorcycle engine. For road use this had lights and direction indicators mounted on a nose grille, a forward bumper and, inside, a standard steering wheel but also a set of flight instruments and engine controls. The Autoplane's roadable component also had both the aircraft's 75 kW (100 hp) Continental air-cooled flat four under the bonnet and the original engine which powered it on the road at up to 70 km/h (43 mph).

The Autoplane had a rectangular plan wing. Its rear fuselage, open at the front until the car/forward fuselage was inserted, was attached to the wing underside from about half chord and tapered rearwards to a conventional tail with a triangular dorsal fillet leading to a large rectangular fin and rudder. The horizontal tail, also rectangular in plan, was attached to the fuselage bottom.

Joining these two parts into an aircraft took two people a little over half an hour. The steering wheel stowed in the car and the bumper in the rear fuselage, then the car was backed into the fuselage opening and linked to the wings by attaching on each side a single lift strut to a bracket on the lower car body. This positioned the windscreen at the wing leading edge and the side windows enclosed the cabin. Entry was via standard car-type, forward hinged doors. Removing the grille revealed a propeller boss and the propeller was bolted on. The Vespa 400 had been modified so that the front wheels could be swung downward and forward on V struts, forming the Autoplanes's narrow track main undercarriage. Its rear suspension was also modified to allow the wheels to be retracted upwards into the body. After a flight, this procedure was reversed, releasing the car to the road.

The date of the first flight is uncertain but it was before 13 July 1973 when the Autoplane received its Certificate of Airworthiness. Later in 1973 it appeared at two RSA meetings, at Montdidier and Montargis, winning four prizes. Lebouder flew it until it was damaged in an accident in 1975. The damage was chiefly confined to the undercarriage and propeller but the Autoplane never flew again, though the road vehicle survived.

== Specifications ==
Data from Gaillard (1991), p.121

General characteristics

- Capacity: Two
- Length: 6.4 m (21 ft 0 in)
- Wingspan: 9.67 m (31 ft 9 in)
- Wing area: 13.8 m^{2} (149 sq ft)
- Empty weight: 470 kg (1,036 lb)
- Gross weight: 750 kg (1,653 lb)
- Powerplant: 1 × Continental air-cooled flat-four, 75 kW (100 hp) only for use in aircraft mode
- Propellers: 2-bladed

Performance

- Maximum speed: 200 km/h (120 mph, 110 kn)
- Cruise speed: 180 km/h (110 mph, 97 kn)
