= Samson Switchblade =

American roadable aircraft

Switchblade
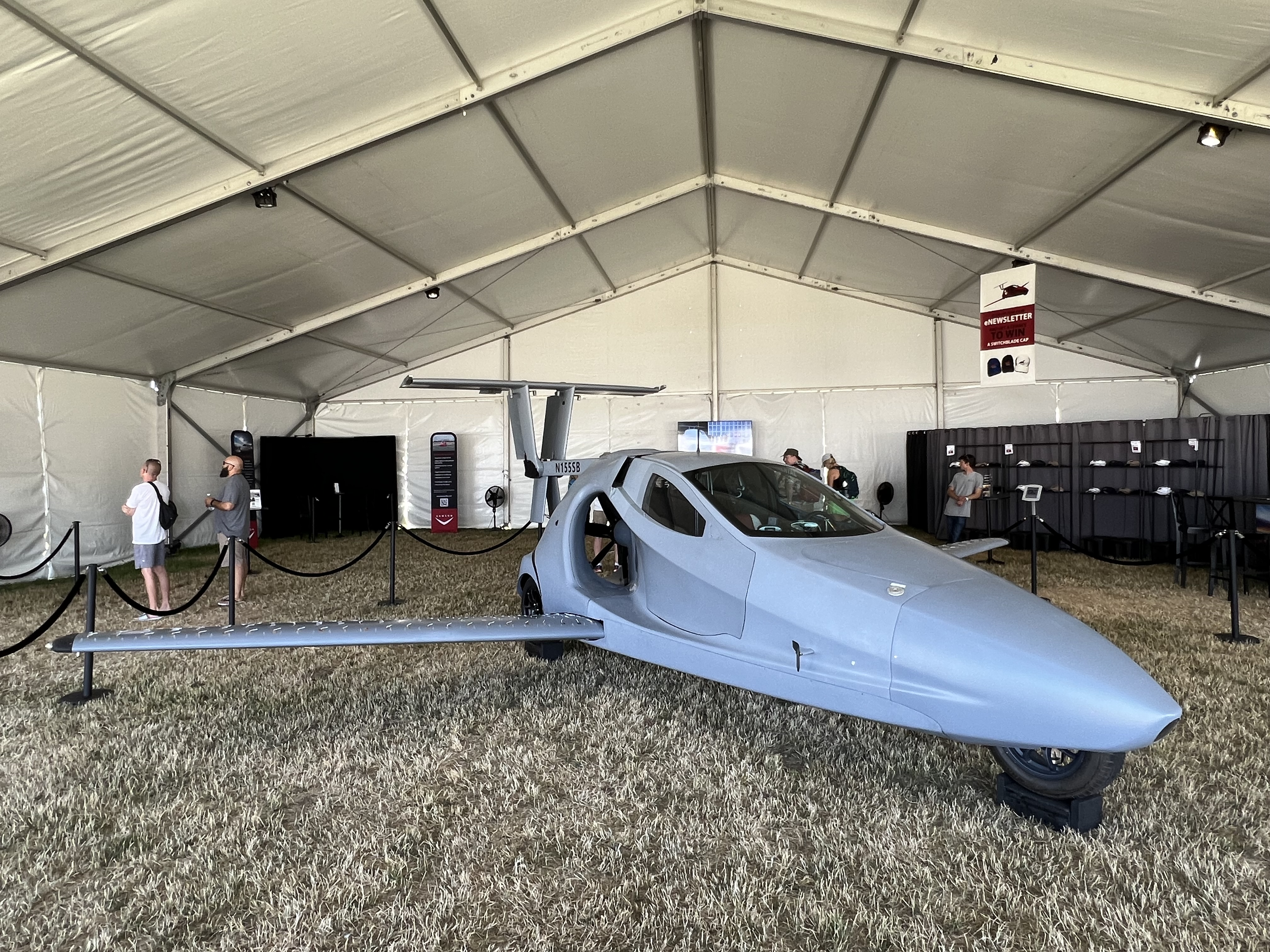
- SG1P Switchblade at EAA AirVenture Oshkosh in 2023

General information
- Type: Amateur-built roadable aircraft
- National origin: United States
- Manufacturer: Samson Sky
- Designer: Sam Bousfield
- Status: Building pre-production prototypes (2025)

History
- Introduction date: 2009 as a mock-up
- First flight: 9 November 2023

The Samson Switchblade is an American roadable aircraft under development by Samson Sky of Redmond, Oregon. A single gasoline engine powers two propellers in flight mode. In drive mode, the wings, tail and propellers fold into the vehicle body and the vehicle is driven as a Motorized tricycle. Switchblade will be sold as an amateur-built aircraft, with buyers building 51% of the vehicle at Samson's production facility and Samson completing the build.

== Design and development ==
The Switchblade design is the brainchild of Samson CEO Sam Bousfield. Switchblade was publicly introduced at AirVenture in 2009 as a mock-up built by aeronautical design firm DAR Corp of Lawrence, Kansas. First flight of the full-sized aircraft was originally forecast in 2009 for 2010, but by July 2012 only a 1/4 scale model had been flown. In February 2014 the design had passed through the final round of wind tunnel testing, and in March 2014 the first carbon fiber parts were made for the conforming flying prototype.

By February 2016, the carbon fiber wings and folding mechanism had been prototyped.

By July 2018, the company was redesigning the tail in preparation for a first flight by year end and claimed 667 orders for the design.

In July 2019, the company was still working towards a first flight and AVweb described the project as "One of the longest in-development flying car projects" and noted that the manufacturer "is still at it", after ten years in development.

The official first flight came on November 9, 2023 at Grant County International Airport (KMWH) in Lake Moses, Washington. The vehicle was airborne for six minutes and reached an altitude of 500 feet. It achieved its ground speed target but failed to reach its target air speed. This led to a redesign in 2024 with larger wings and the replacement of the large ducted fan with two smaller propellers that fold into the fuselage along with the tail when in drive mode. The new, sleeker, design was validated by wind tunnel testing and Samson is now building prototypes for flight testing and marketing.

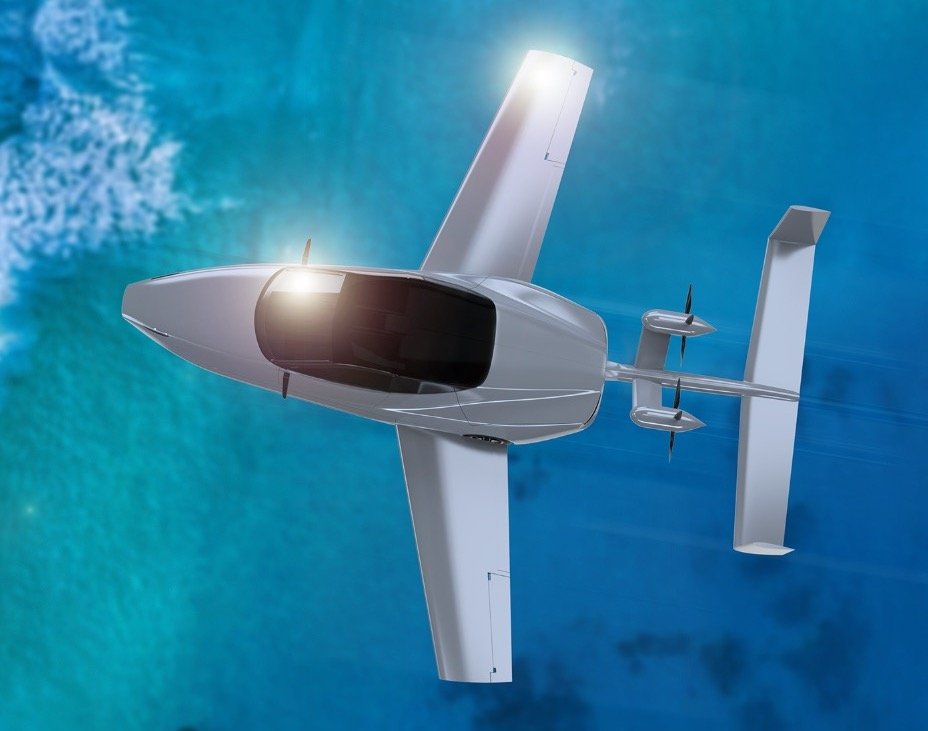
Render of 2024 redesign in flight mode

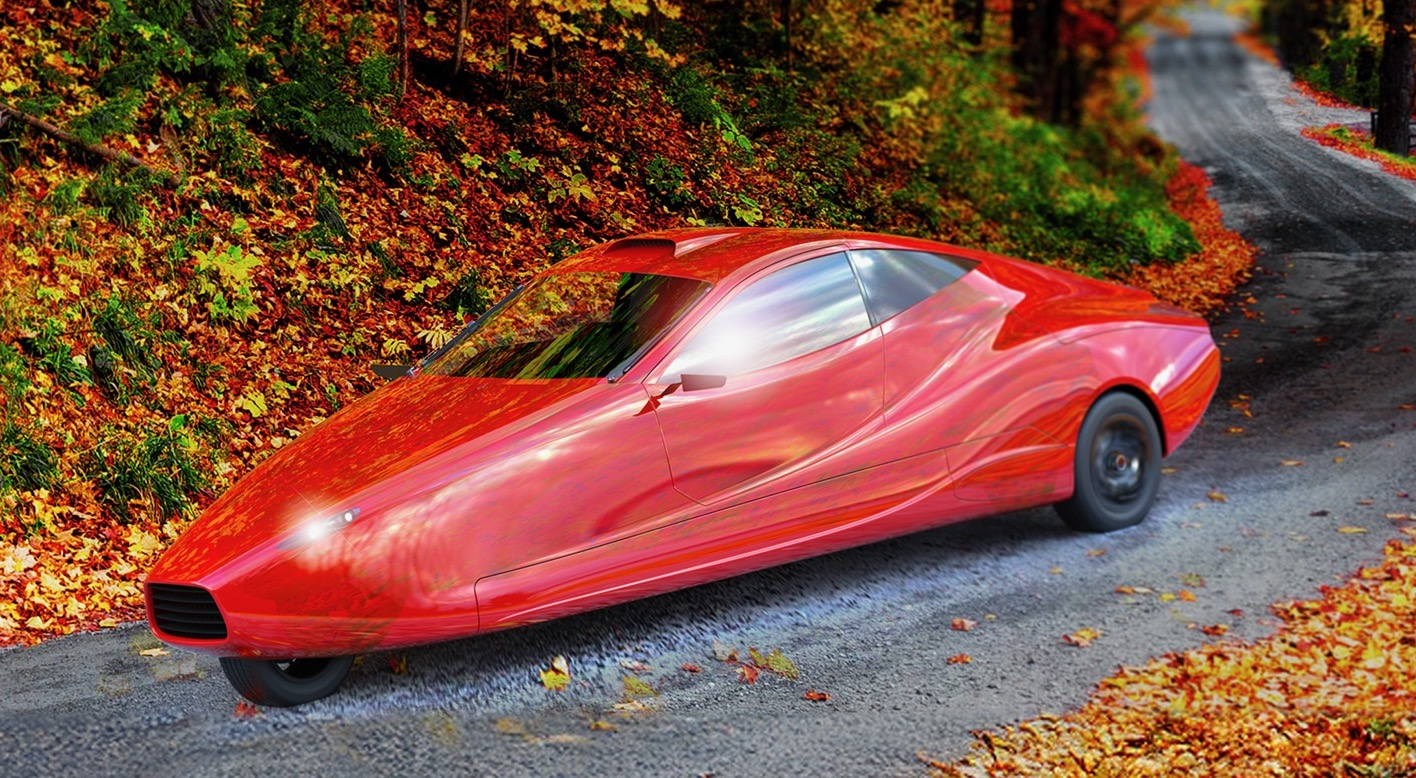
Render of 2024 redesign in drive mode

The Switchblade will be a three-wheeled motorized tricycle-type vehicle with forward retracting wings. It features two-seats-in-side-by-side configuration in an enclosed cockpit with space for 50 lb (23 kg) of baggage, fixed tricycle landing gear and a single engine powering two propellers in pusher configuration for flight that will also drive the rear wheels on the ground. Early designs included a canard surface.

The aircraft is made from composites and its fuselage shape was inspired by Ferrari automotive designs. Its 26.9 ft (8.2 m) span wing has an area of 99 sq ft (9.2 m^{2}) and fits slotted flaps. For ground use, the wings fold forward under the aircraft's belly into a clamshell case and the tail and propellers fold forward into the rear fuselage, protecting them from road debris. There is an impact-absorbing steel structural keel. Due to differing angle of incidence requirements and the large rear road wheels, the nose will be raised 4° for take-off, eliminating the need to rotate the vehicle in aircraft mode. The powerplant is a hybrid system, with a gasoline engine powering an electrical generator that powers motors from Slovenian company Beyond Motors.

The vehicle will require a motorcycle or automobile driver's license to operate on the ground and a minimum of a private pilot license to fly.

== Specifications (projected performance) ==
Data from Bayerl, AVweb and Samson

General characteristics

- Crew: one
- Capacity: one passenger
- Length: 16.8 ft (5.1 m) in ground mode, 20.2 ft (6.2 m) in air mode
- Wingspan: 26 ft 9 in (8.15 m)
- Height: 5 ft 1 in (1.55 m)
- Wing area: 99 sq ft (9.2 m^{2})
- Empty weight: 1,275 lb (578 kg)
- Gross weight: 1,850 lb (839 kg)
- Fuel capacity: 40 U.S. gallons (150 L; 33 imp gal)
- Powerplant: 1 × Samson three cylinder, liquid-cooled engine, 190 hp (140 kW)

Performance

- Maximum speed: 200 mph (320 km/h, 170 kn) in the air, 100 mph (161 km/h) on the ground
- Cruise speed: 160 mph (260 km/h, 140 kn) in the air
- Stall speed: 67 mph (108 km/h, 58 kn)
- Range: 500 mi (800 km, 430 nmi)
- Service ceiling: 13,000 ft (4,000 m)
- Wing loading: 23 lb/sq ft (110 kg/m^{2})

Avionics

- 7″ Dynon Skyview
- 10″ Dynon Skyview
- Garmin AERA 550
- Garmin GMA 340
- Garmin SL30
- Garmin GTX 330.
