= PAL-V Liberty =

Combination car and autogyro

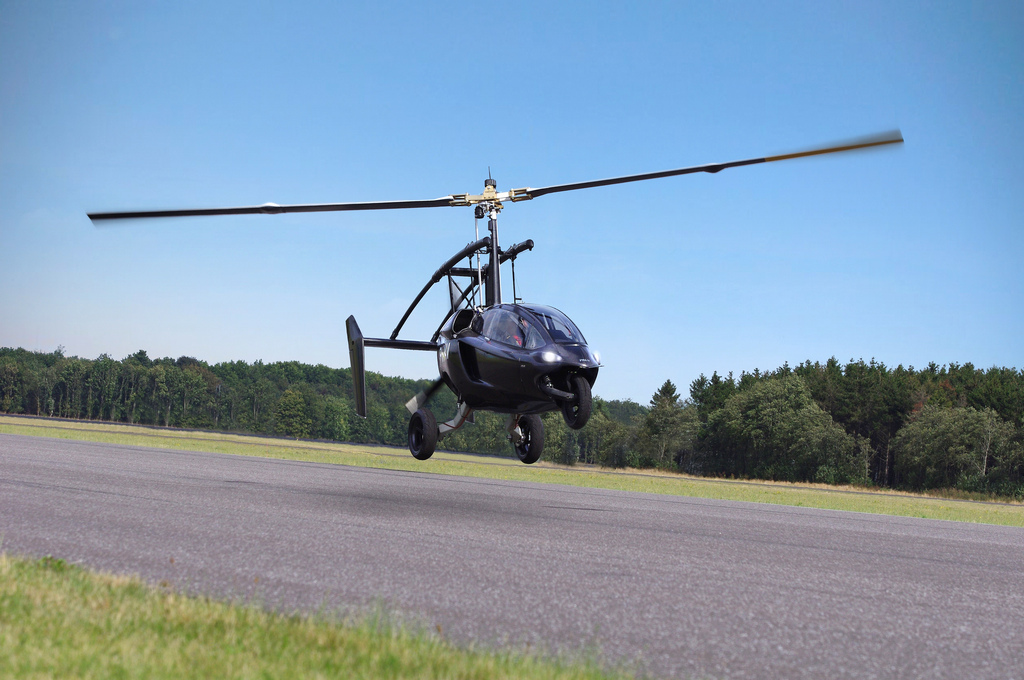

General information
- Type: Flying Car, Roadable aircraft
- National origin: Netherlands
- Manufacturer: PAL-V
- Designer: C. Klok (exterior design)
- Status: In test
- Number built: 1

History
- First flight: March 2012

The PAL-V Liberty is a combination of a three-wheeled car and an autogyro, or gyroplane under development by PAL-V of the Netherlands. Both a driver's license and an autogyro pilot's license are required to operate the vehicle.

== Design and development ==
The company settled on a gyroplane design for a number of reasons. "The gyroplane principle not only provides us with a safe and easy-to-operate flying car but it also enables us to make it compact and within existing regulations, which is the most important factor to build a useable flying car," said Mike Stekelenburg, Chief Engineer at PAL-V. Pilots will require a Private pilot licence) with a gyroplane rating to fly the PAL-V Liberty.

On the ground, the propeller and rotor are stopped and power is diverted to the wheels, allowing it to travel as a three-wheeled car, which will enable easier and safer take-off and landing. In addition, it also has a high center of gravity to make it stable in the air by allowing the propeller to act through the vertical center of gravity. In 2005, new technology by Carver provided a solution for the high center of gravity issue. Their Dynamic Curve Stabilizer System ensured the road safety of the 'roadable gyroplane'.

In 2009, PAL-V tested the tilting system with Prototype X1 on the road. After the successful test, PAL-V started to build Prototype X2, also known as the PAL-V ONE. PAL-V made its first flight with the PAL-V ONE in 2012. At that time, the company was seeking funds to develop the type for production. The estimated unit price in 2012 was around €300,000. By proving this concept, PAL-V started the design of its first commercial flying car model, based on the proven technologies.

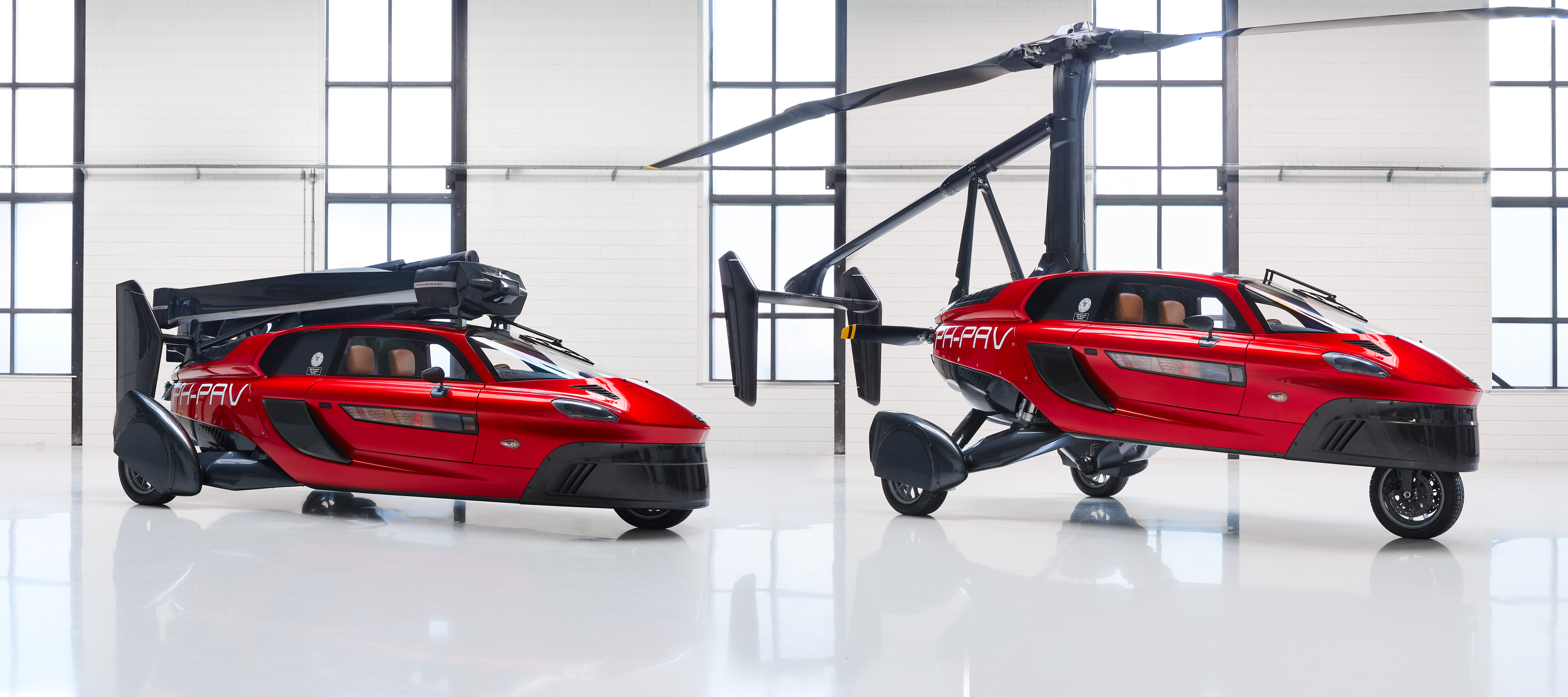
PAL-V Liberty Sport edition

In February 2017, PAL-V started its marketing campaign with the public launch of the PAL-V Liberty and announced that they had started selling the first commercial flying car. The production model was first publicly shown at the Geneva Motor Show in Switzerland on 6 March 2018.

PAL-V has 2 different versions, the Liberty Sport and the Liberty Pioneer. The Sport edition is the base model. The Pioneer edition is the limited-edition model. This model will be delivered prior to any other version and includes all available options. Sport prices were expected to start from €300,000 and the Pioneer edition will be €500,000.

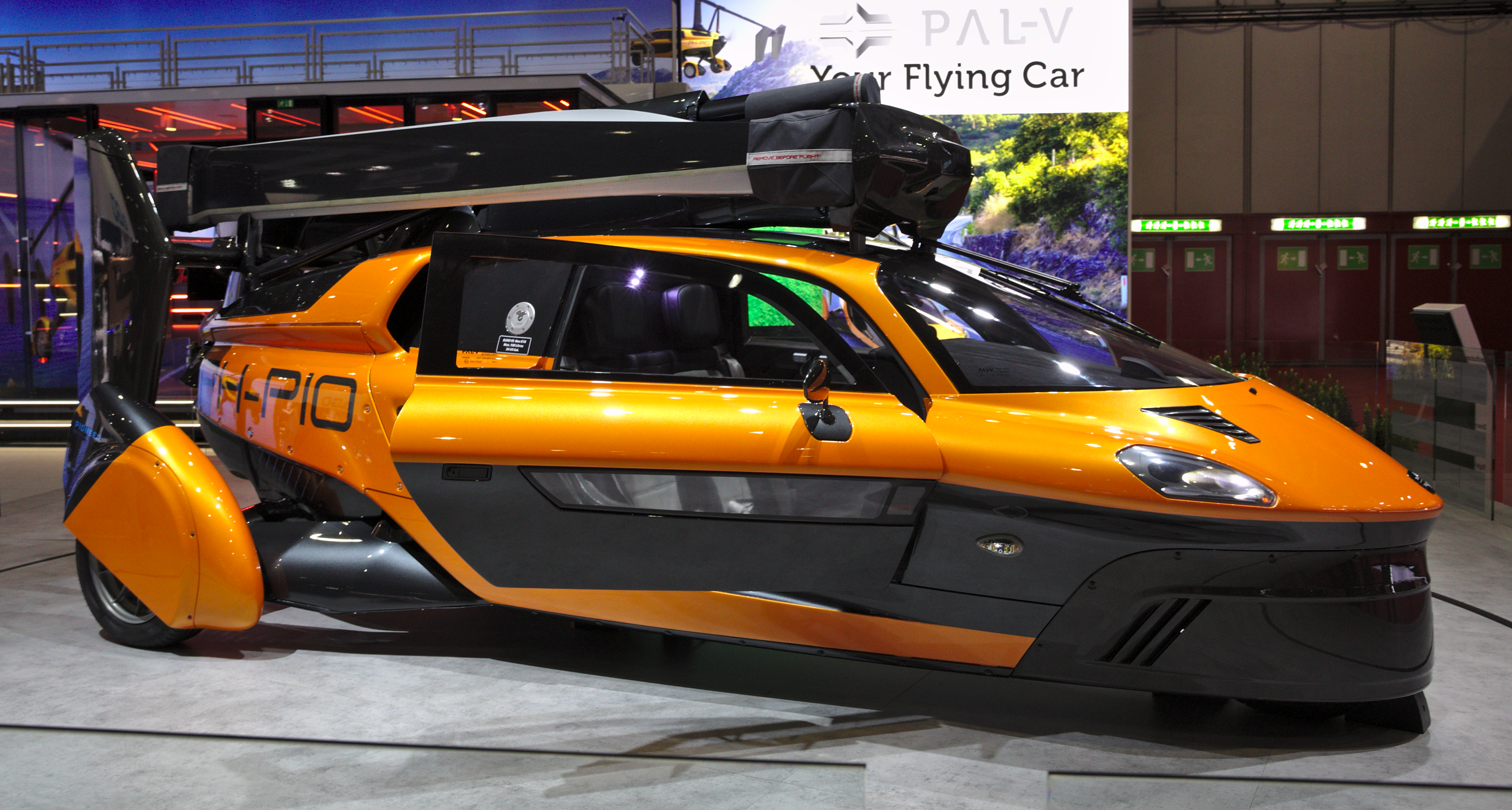
PAL-V Liberty Pioneer edition

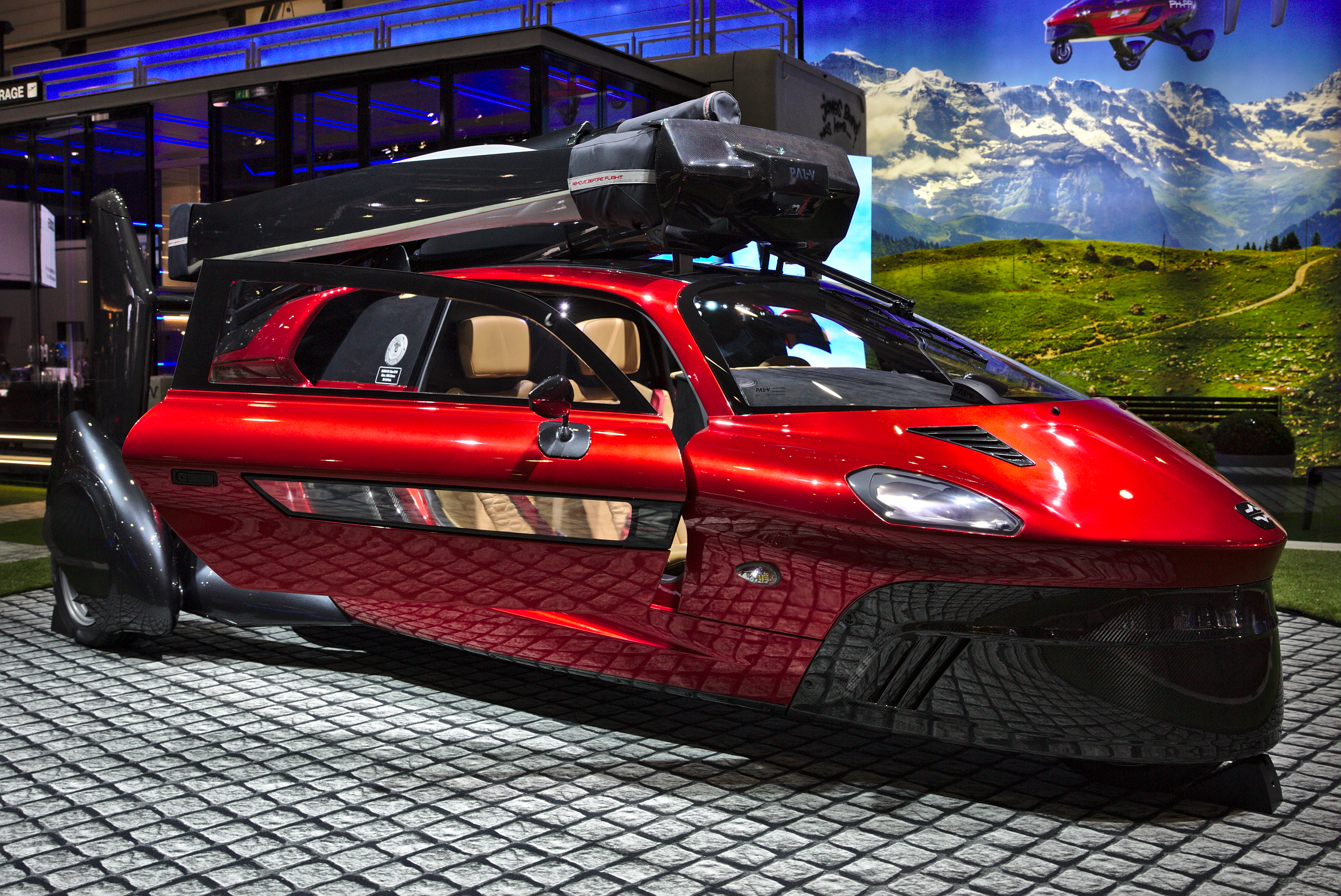
PAL-V Public launch in Geneva

After delivering 90 Pioneer Editions, PAL-V will start shipping the Sport Edition. The projected delivery date has been postponed numerous times, and was first expected in the 2010s. As of March 2022 the first delivery was expected to be in 2023. As of August 2024, it has been communicated first delivery will occur 'somewhere in 2026'. Later, in 2025, it was communicated first delivery would take place in early 2027, in the UAE. Anticipated prices have increased to €800.000 Since early 2025 no further updates on availability or timelines have been brought forward.

On 9 March, 2020, the company VP, international business development, Carlo Maasbommel, signed a Memorandum of Understanding with the Indian state of Gujarat, to set up a manufacturing and export plant there. At the time the company aimed to export PAL-V from India to the US, the Netherlands, the UK, etc. from 2021.

As of March 2022 the PAL-V Liberty has obtained European Road Admission for road use and agreed the flight certification basis with the European Aviation Safety Agency (EASA).

== Specifications ==
=== Technical specifications ===
- Capacity: pilot and one passenger
- Mass empty: 664 kg
- Maximum Take-Off Weight (MTOW): 910 kg
- Maximum baggage load: 20 kg
- Fuel type: Euro 95, Euro 98, E10
- Fuel capacity: 100 l

=== Drive mode ===
- Max speed: 170 km/h
- Top speed acceleration (0-100 km/h): <9 seconds
- Engine power: 100 hp
- Dimensions, L×W×H: 4 × 2 × 1,7m
- Range: 1300 km

=== Flight mode ===
- Economic cruise speed: 140 km/h
- Max speed: 180 km/h
- Engine power: 200 hp
- Dimensions, L×W×H: 6,1 × 2 × 3,2 m
- Rotor diameter: 10,75 m
- Maximum altitude: 3500 m
- Take-off distance: 180 m
- Landing roll distance: 30 m
- Range: 400-500 km
