= Doron Merdinger =

Israeli-American entrepreneur and designer

Doron Merdinger is an Israeli‑American entrepreneur and designer. He was chief executive of the silversmith firm Hazorfim in Israel, and co‑founded Doroni Aerospace, an electric vertical take‑off and landing (eVTOL) developer based in Pompano Beach, Florida.

== Career ==
=== Hazorfim and design work ===
Merdinger became marketing director and later chief executive of Hazorfim. The firm reported around 200 employees and annual revenue of about US $18 million.

After relocating to Miami he established the Merdinger House of Design and applied computer‑aided design and early 3‑D printing to collections such as Arabesque, Jacob’s Ladder and Ropes and Sails. Media profiles noted his use of porcelain, metals and crystals.

=== Doroni Aerospace ===
In 2016 Merdinger co‑founded Doroni Aerospace to develop personal eVTOL aircraft.

- The two‑seat H1‑X prototype received an FAA Special Airworthiness Certificate in December 2023.
- Early crowdfunding raised more than US $1 million, followed by a StartEngine campaign that brought proceeds above US $5.8 million.
- In February 2025 agreements with Saudi partners were valued at up to US $180 million for manufacturing and export cooperation.
