= Plane Driven PD-1 =

Type of aircraft

PD-1
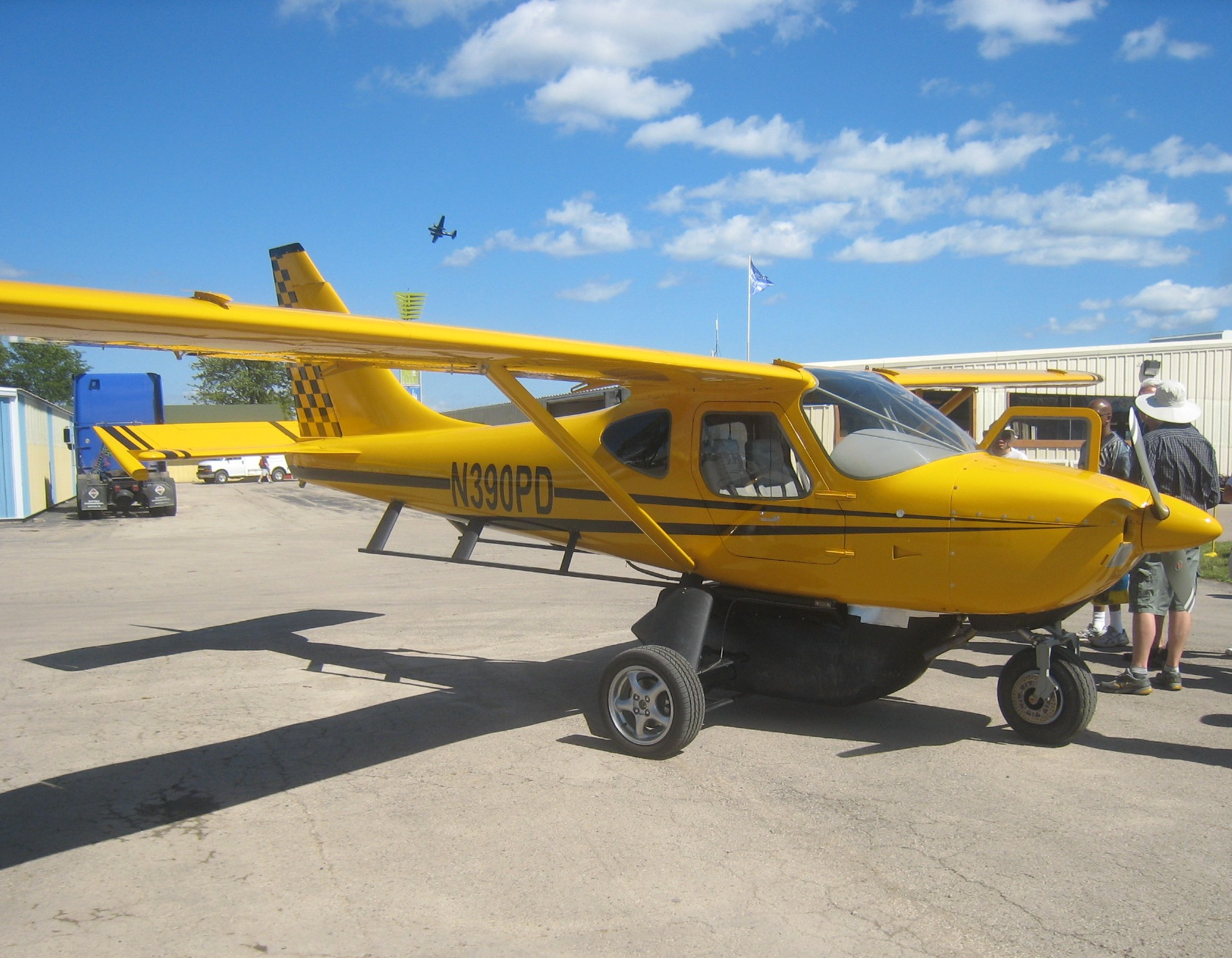
- Prototype PD-1 in 2010

General information
- Type: Roadable aircraft
- National origin: United States of America
- Manufacturer: Plane Driven, Stoddard-Hamilton Aircraft
- Designer: Trey Johnson
- Status: In development

History
- Introduction date: 2010
- First flight: July 21, 2010
- Developed from: Glasair Sportsman 2+2

The Plane Driven PD-1 is a modification to the Glasair Sportsman 2+2 to convert it into a practical roadable aircraft. The approach is novel in that it uses a mostly stock aircraft with a modified landing gear "pod" that carries a separate engine for road propulsion.

The PD-1's wings fold along its sides, and the main landing gear and road engine pod slide aft along special rails, creating a driving configuration. The driving configuration compensates for the rearward center of gravity created by the folded wings, and provides additional stability for road travel.

== Development ==
Trey Johnson, an award-winning homebuilt aircraft builder took on the challenge of making a roadable aircraft. The PD-1 is intended to be an aircraft first, and a car second. The vehicle can cruise at a speed of up to 140 mph in normal flight even with the road engine sitting as dead weight.

== Design ==
The engine pod carries a separate engine for road travel with its own fuel tank. The wheels are driven through an automatic transmission with a reverse gear. The lightweight fuselage coupled with a low power engine allows 25 miles per US gallon (9.4 L/100 km; 30 mpg_{‑imp}) fuel economy with 5 US gallons (19 L) of usable fuel. The aircraft is registered in Washington state as a motorcycle due to its 3-wheel configuration.

The wings are hinged to allow them to rotate and fold back against the rear fuselage of the plane. The horizontal stabilizer is also hinged to reduce the width of the vehicle in road travel mode.

== Operational history ==
The prototype was constructed using Glasair's two weeks to taxi program. It was started on March 29, 2010, and the modified prototype was test flown by July 21, 2010.

The prototype was displayed at the Experimental Aircraft Association Airventure airshow in 2010. The company's second generation refinement was code named the PD-X, with intention of building a marketable aircraft based on the PD-X test results.

== Variants ==
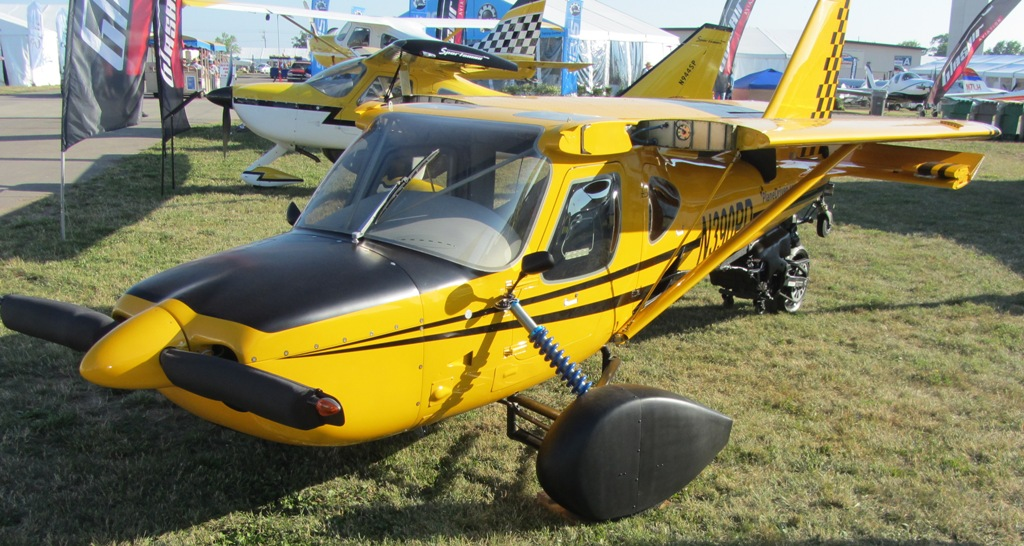
PD-2 on display

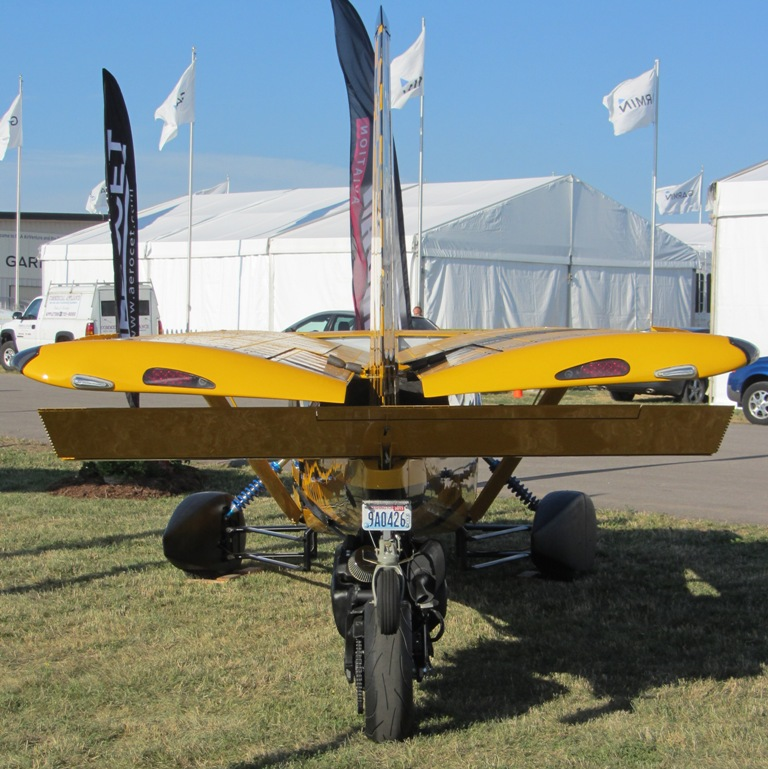
PD-2 rear

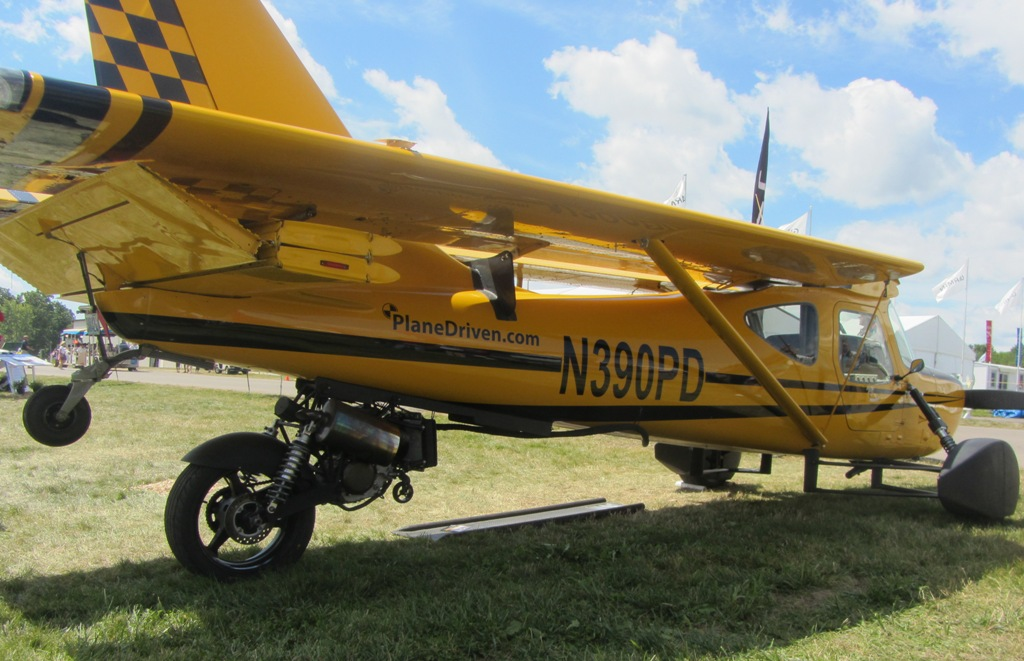
PD-2 pod installation

- PD-1
- PD-2 A second generation version of the PD-1 using the same Sportsman airframe as the PD-1. The PD-2 uses two forward mounted wheels with suspension in a conventional landing gear layout. A single rear wheel is mounted aft on the pod containing the second engine for road use. An updated pod was developed using a 50 hp four strokes engine with casters that fits into the baggage compartment. A custom lightweight four-piece carbon-fiber ramp can be used to load the pod without lifting. Gas mileage is 24mpg in ground use.

== Specifications PD-1 ==
Data from Sport Aviation

General characteristics

- Capacity: 2 persons
- Length: 23 ft (7.0 m) 24 feet 8 inches with wings folded
- Wingspan: 35 ft 0 in (1,067 m)
- Wing area: 131 sq ft (12.2 m^{2})
- Aspect ratio: 9.1
- Fuel capacity: 50 US gallons
- Powerplant: 1 × Lycoming IO-390 , 210 hp (160 kW)
- Powerplant: 2 × 500cc Yamaha Phazer 4 Cycle, 80 hp (60 kW) each

Performance

- Cruise speed: 122 kn (140 mph, 226 km/h)
