= Flying car =

Car that can be flown in much the same way as a car may be driven

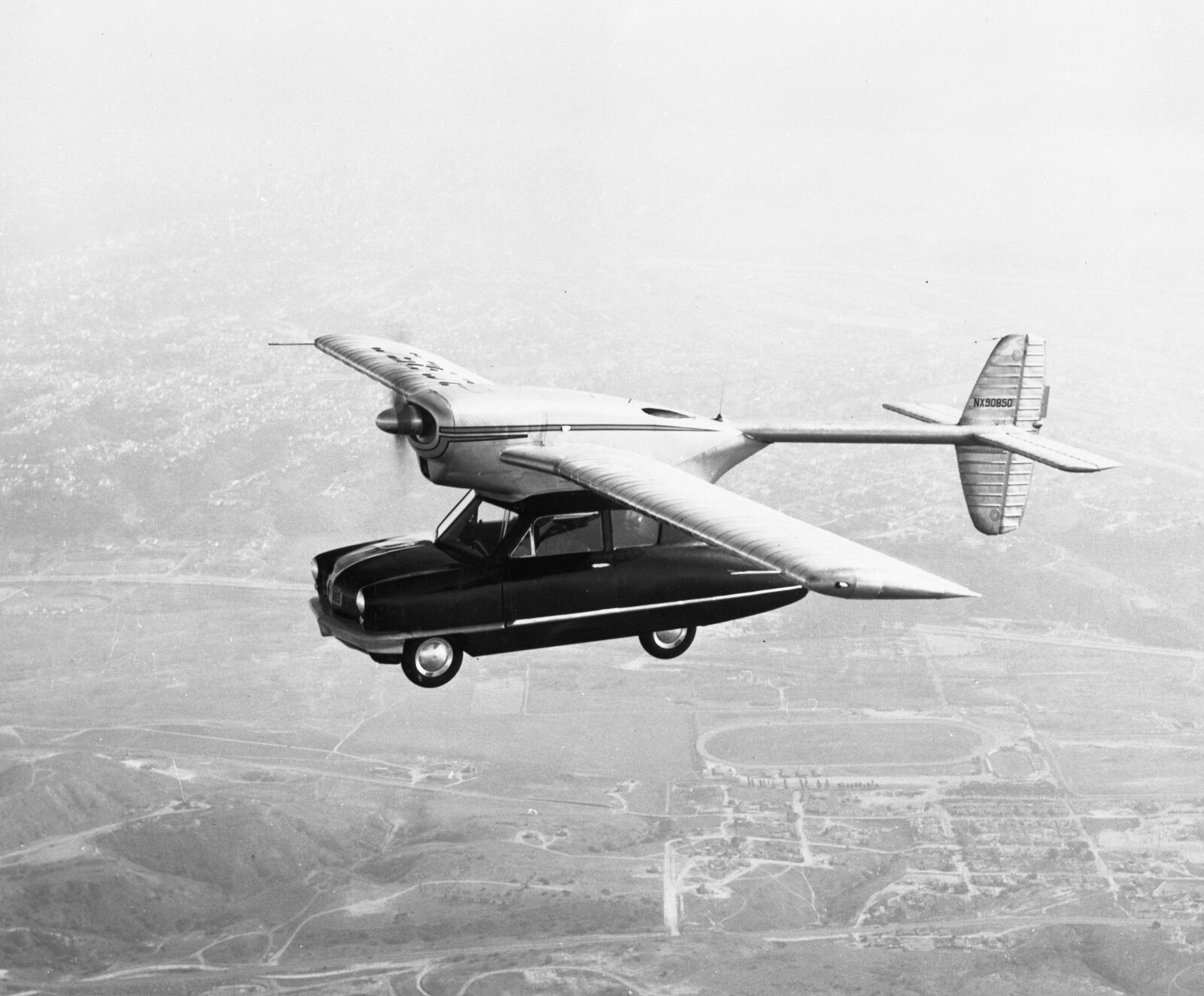
Convair Model 118, a prototype flying car from 1947, in flight

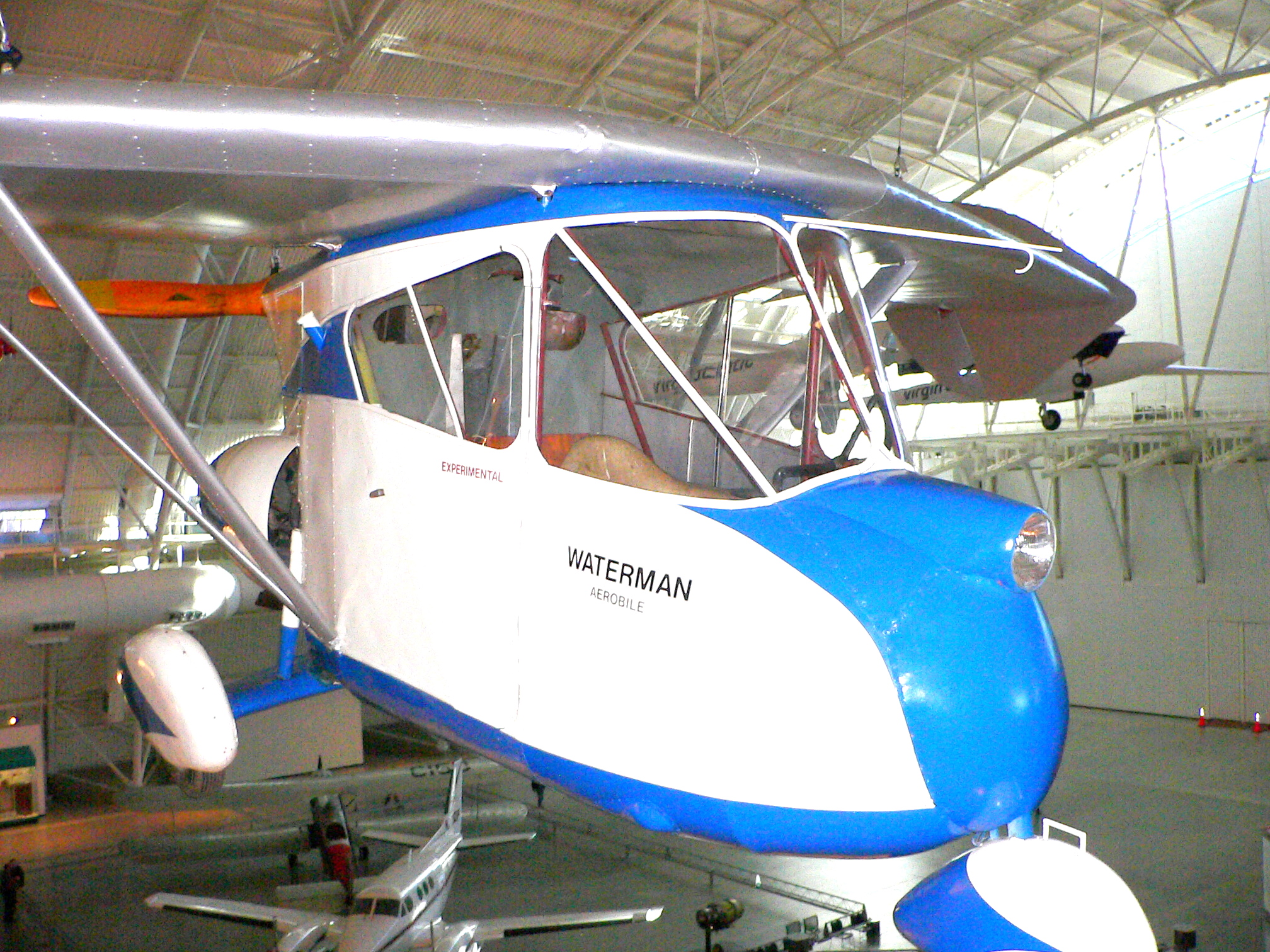
The Waterman Arrowbile at the Smithsonian

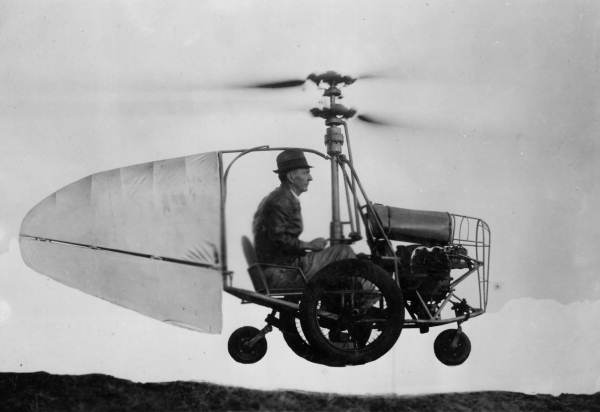
Jess Dixon's flying automobile c. 1940

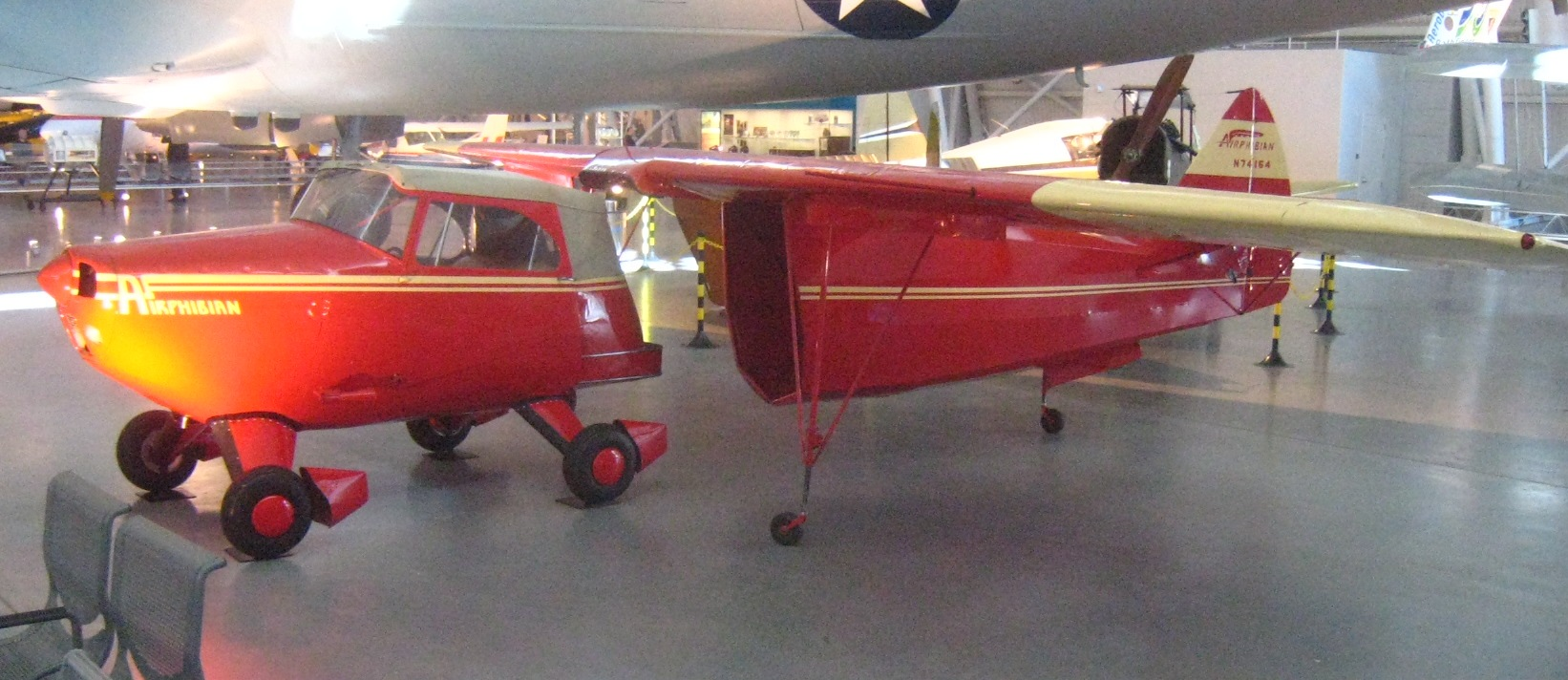
Fulton Airphibian FA-3-101

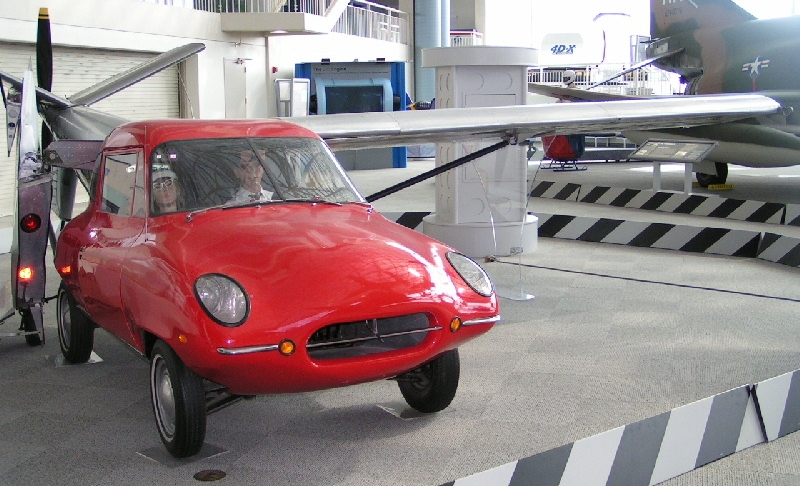
Moulton Taylor's Aerocar III

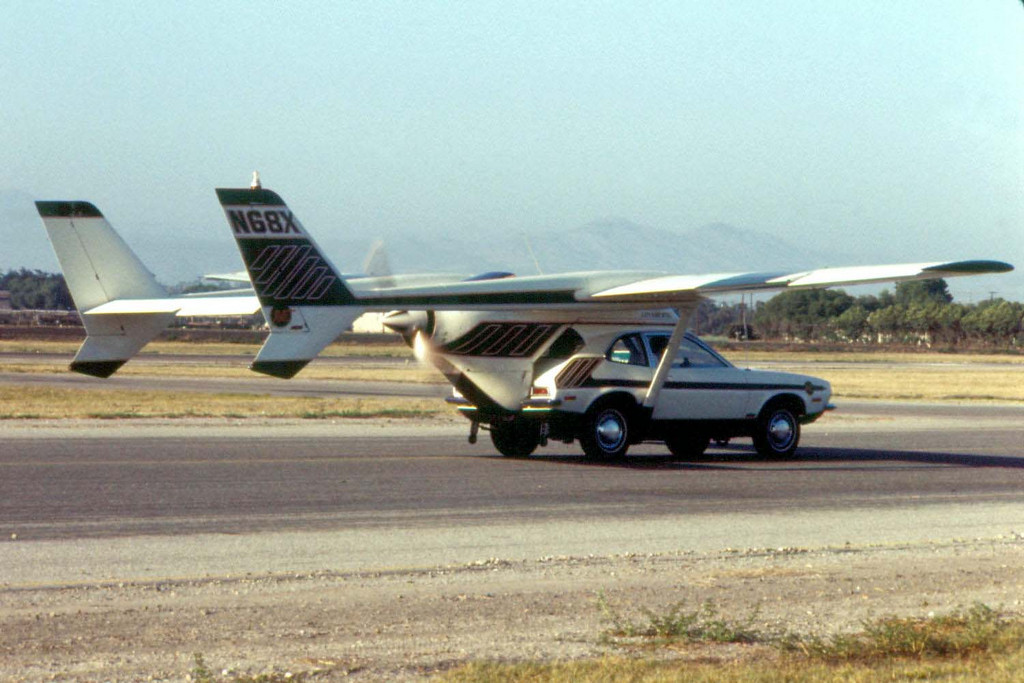
The Mizar by Advanced Vehicle Engineers, August 1973

A flying car or roadable aircraft is a type of vehicle which can function both as a road vehicle and as an aircraft. The term "flying car" includes motor vehicles that are classified as motorcycles when operated on public roads ("flying motorcycles"). It is also sometimes used to include hovercars and/or personal air vehicles. Since the early 20th century, many prototypes have been built, employing a variety of flight technologies. Most have been designed to take off and land conventionally using a runway. Although vertical take-off and landing (VTOL) projects are increasing, none has yet been produced in significant quantities.

Their appearance is often speculated by futurologists, and many concept designs have been promoted. Their failure to become a practical reality has led to the catchphrase "Where's my flying car?", as a paradigm for the failure of predicted technologies to appear. Flying cars are also a popular theme in fantasy and science fiction stories.

== History ==
=== Early 20th century ===
In 1901, German immigrant to the United States Gustave Whitehead claimed to have flown a powered aircraft, described as being able to propel itself along roads to the site of the flying experiment. Consensus among historians is that Whitehead's No. 21 machine did not achieve sustained self-powered flight.

In 1917, aircraft designer Glenn Curtiss built his Autoplane. It had a pusher propeller for flight, with removable flight surfaces including a triplane wing, canard foreplane and twin tails. It was able to hop, but not fly.

In 1935, Constantinos Vlachos built a prototype of a "tri-phibian" vehicle with a circular wing, but it caught fire after the engine exploded while he was demonstrating it in Washington, D.C. Vlachos was badly injured and spent several months in the hospital. The machine is most notable for a newsreel that captured the incident.

The Autogiro Company of America AC-35 was a prototype roadable autogyro, flown on 26 March 1936 by test pilot James G. Ray. Forward thrust was initially provided by twin counter-rotating propellers for thrust, later replaced with a single propeller. On 26 October 1936, the aircraft was converted to a roadable configuration. Ray drove it to the main entrance of the Commerce Building in Washington D.C., where it was accepted by John H. Geisse, chief of the Aeronautics Branch. Although it had been successfully tested, it did not enter production.

The first fixed wing roadable aircraft to fly was built by Waldo Waterman. Waterman had been associated with Glenn Curtiss when pioneering amphibious aircraft at North Island on San Diego Bay in the 1910s. On 21 February 1937, Waterman's Arrowbile first took to the air. The Arrowbile was a development of Waterman's tailless aircraft, the Whatsit. It had a wingspan of 12 m (38 ft) and a length of 6.25 m (20 ft 6 in). It was powered by a Studebaker engine both on the ground and in the air. It could fly at 180 km/h (112 mph) and drive at 90 km/h (56 mph).

In 1942, the British army built the Hafner Rotabuggy, an experimental roadable autogyro that was developed with the intention of air-dropping off-road vehicles. In its developed form, the Rotabuggy achieved a flight speed of 113 km/h (70 mph). However, the introduction of gliders that could carry vehicles (such as the Waco Hadrian and Airspeed Horsa) led to the project's cancellation.

=== Late 20th century ===
Although several designs (such as the ConVairCar) have flown, none have enjoyed commercial success, and those that have flown are not widely known by the general public. The most successful example, in that several were made and one is still flying, is the 1949 Taylor Aerocar.

In 1946, the Fulton FA-2 Airphibian was an American-made flying car designed by Robert Edison Fulton Jr.; it was an aluminum-bodied car, built with independent suspension, aircraft-sized wheels, and a six-cylinder 165 hp engine. The fabric wings were easily attached to the fuselage, converting the car into a plane. Four prototypes were built. Charles Lindbergh flew it in 1950 and, although it was not a commercial success (financial costs of airworthiness certification forced him to relinquish control of the company, which never developed it further), it is now in the Smithsonian.

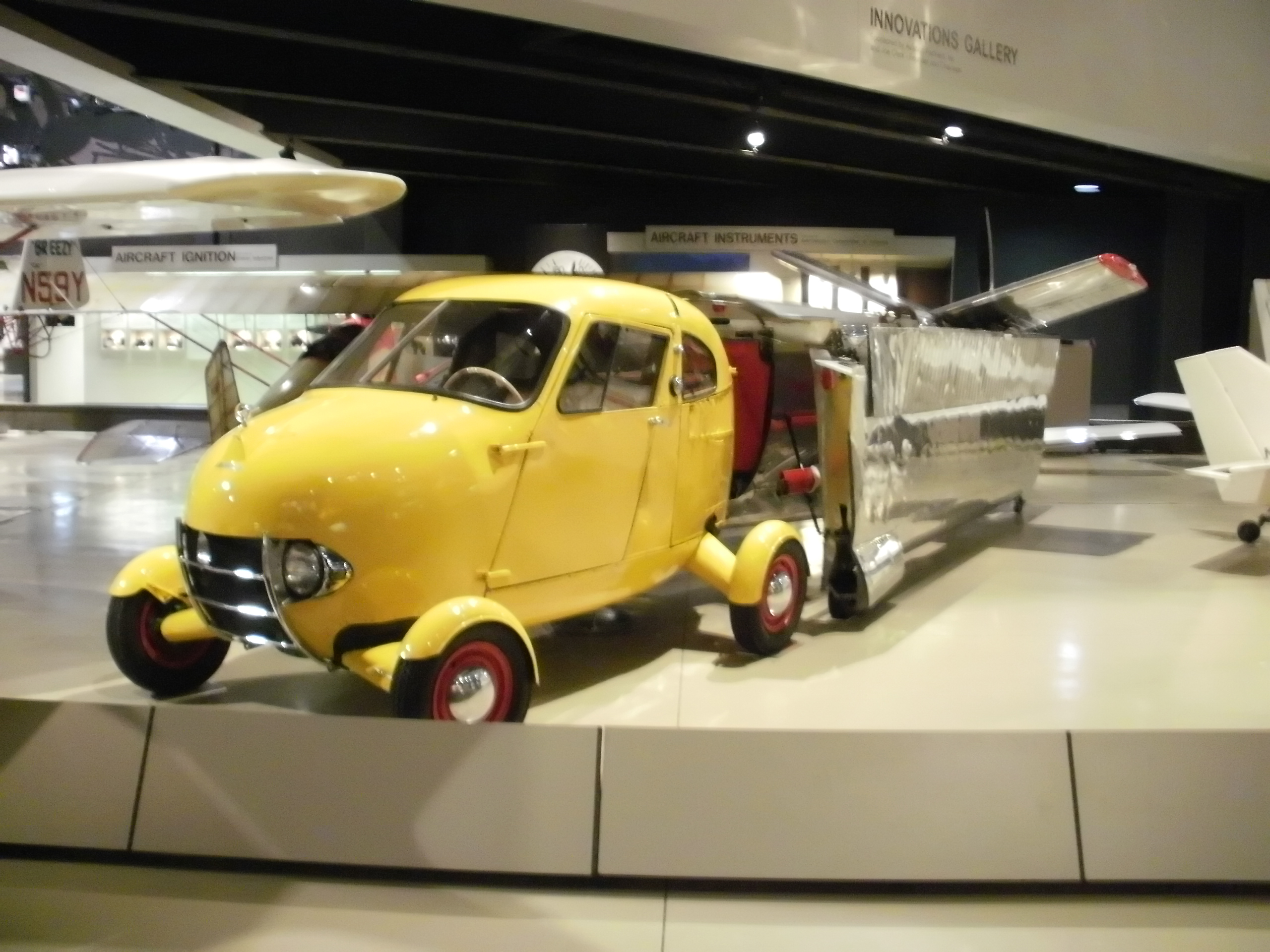
1949 Aerocar with wings folded, at the EAA AirVenture Museum

The Aerocar, designed and built by Molt Taylor, made a successful flight in December 1949, and in following years, versions underwent a series of road and flying tests. Chuck Berry featured the concept in his 1956 song "You Can't Catch Me", and in December 1956 the Civil Aviation Authority approved the design for mass production, but despite wide publicity and an improved version produced in 1989, Taylor did not succeed in getting the flying car into production. In total, six Aerocars were built. It is considered to be one of the first practical flying cars.

One notable design was Henry Smolinski's Mizar, which was made by combining the rear end of a Cessna Skymaster with a Ford Pinto; however, it disintegrated during a test flight, killing Smolinski and Harold Blake.

Project Prodigal was a British Army concept in the late 1950s and early 1960s for a "Jumping Jeep" to overcome obstacles on the battlefield with entrants British Aircraft Corporation, Boulton Paul, Bristol Siddeley, Folland, Handley Page, Saunders-Roe, Short Brothers, Vickers-Armstrongs, and Westland.

Moller began developing vertical take-off and landing (VTOL) craft in the late 1960s, but no Moller vehicle has ever achieved free flight out of ground effect. The Moller Skycar M400 was a project for a personal VTOL aircraft which is powered by four pairs of in-tandem Wankel rotary engines. The proposed Autovolantor model had an all-electric version powered by Altairnano batteries. The company has been dormant since 2015.

In the mid-1980s, former Boeing engineer Fred Barker founded Flight Innovations Inc. and began the development of the Sky Commuter, a small duct fans-based VTOL aircraft. It was a compact 4.3-metre-long (14 ft) two-passenger craft made primarily of composite materials. In 2008, the remaining prototype was sold for £86,000 on eBay.

=== 21st century ===
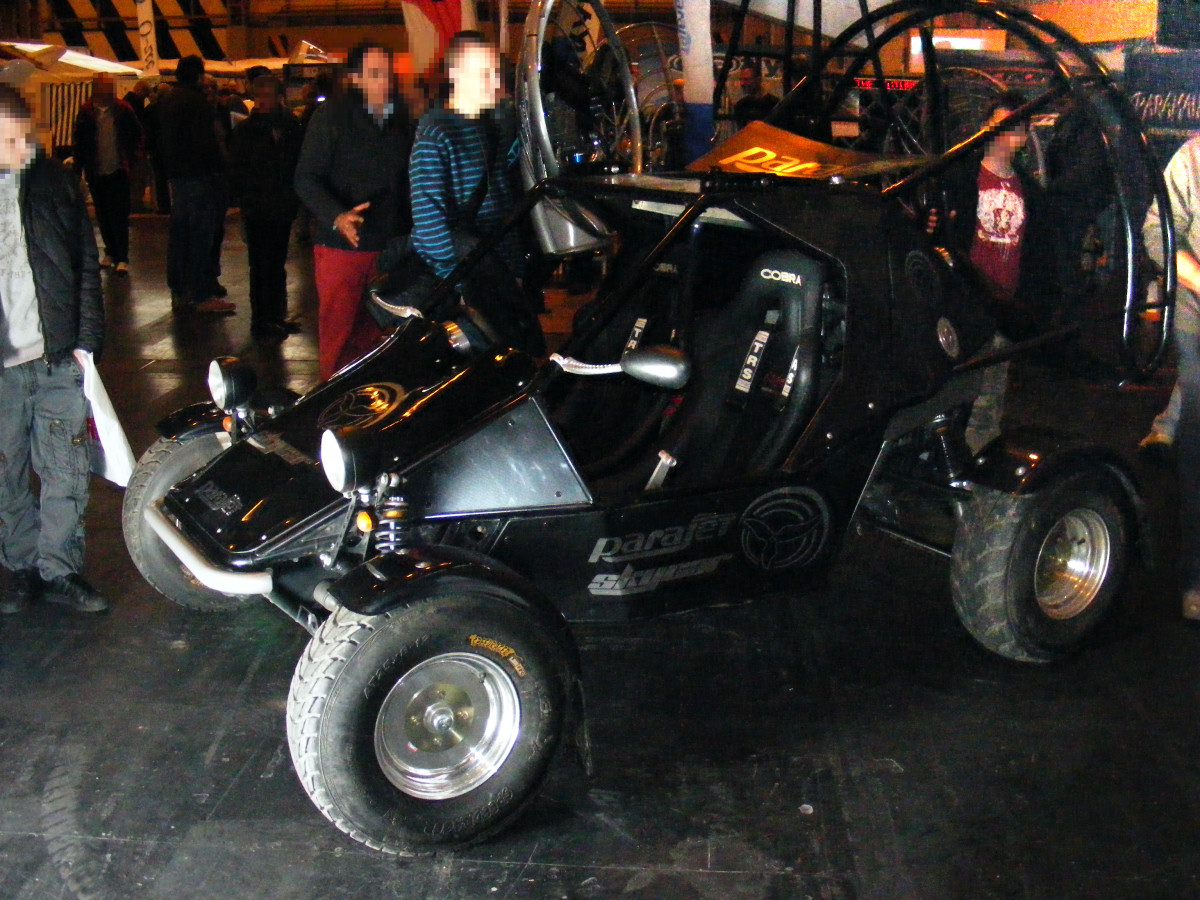
Parajet Skycar prototype seen at the Sport and Leisure Aviation Show (SPLASH), Birmingham, UK, November 2008

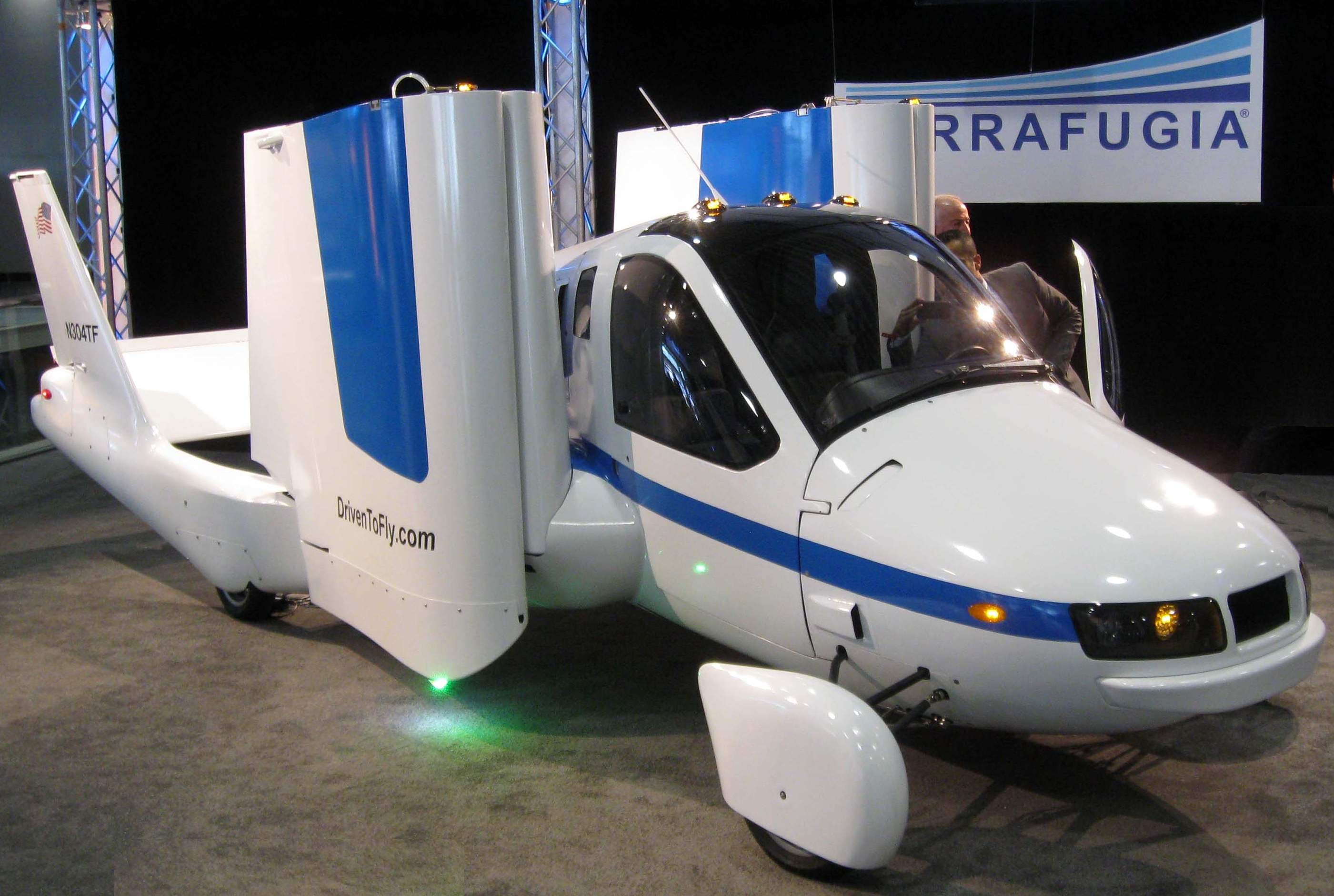
Prototype Terrafugia Transition at the N.Y. Int'l Auto Show in April 2012

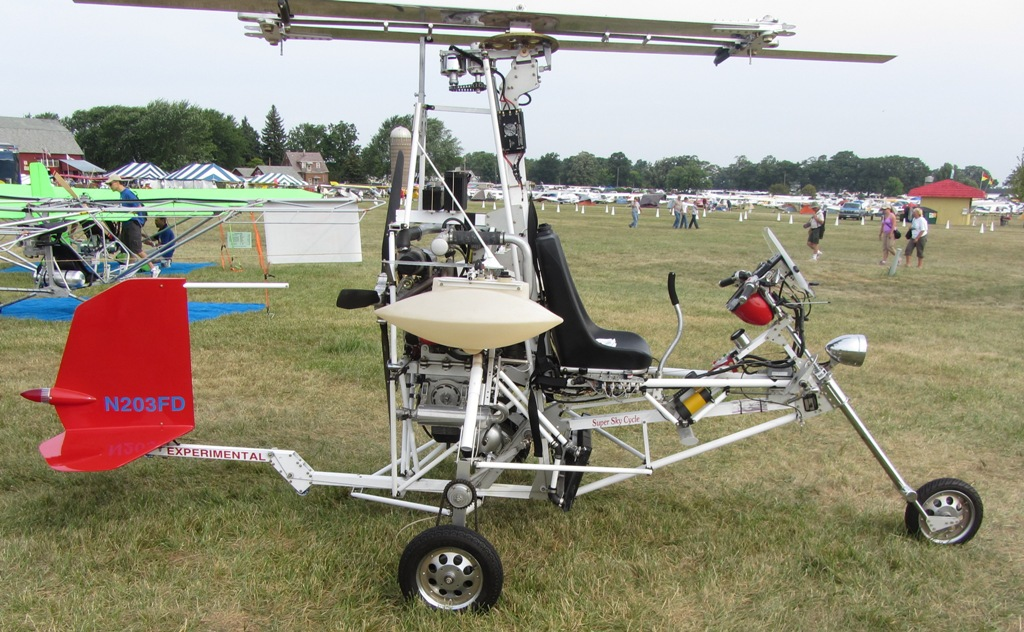
Super Sky Cycle

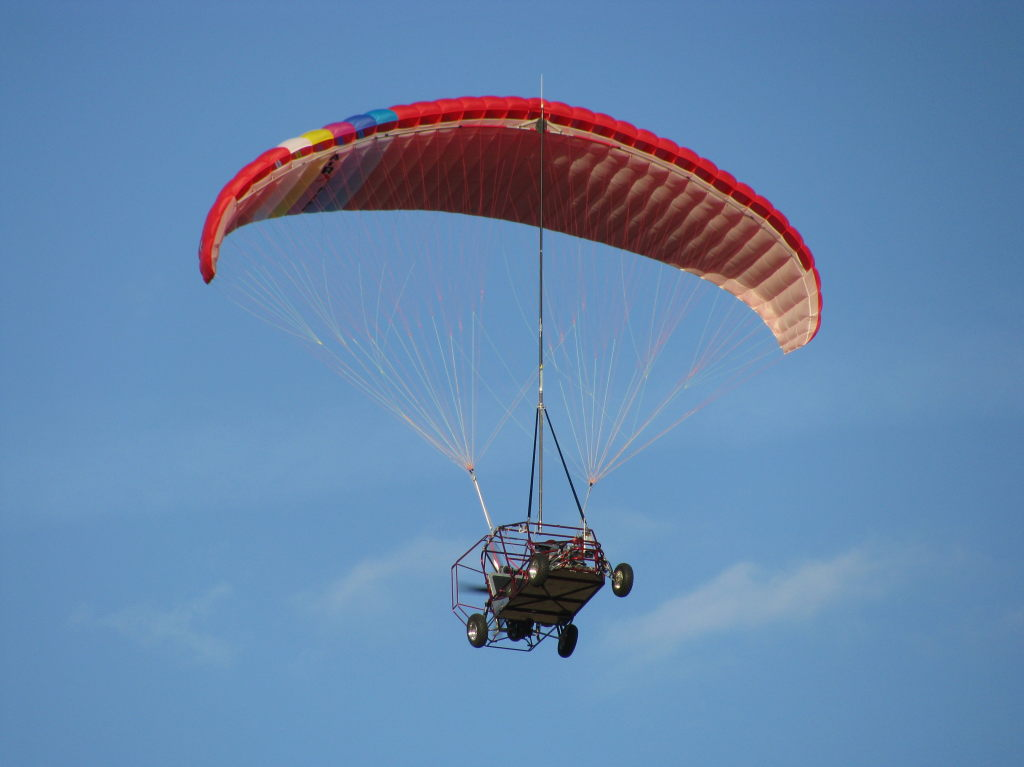
Maverick Flying Dune Buggy

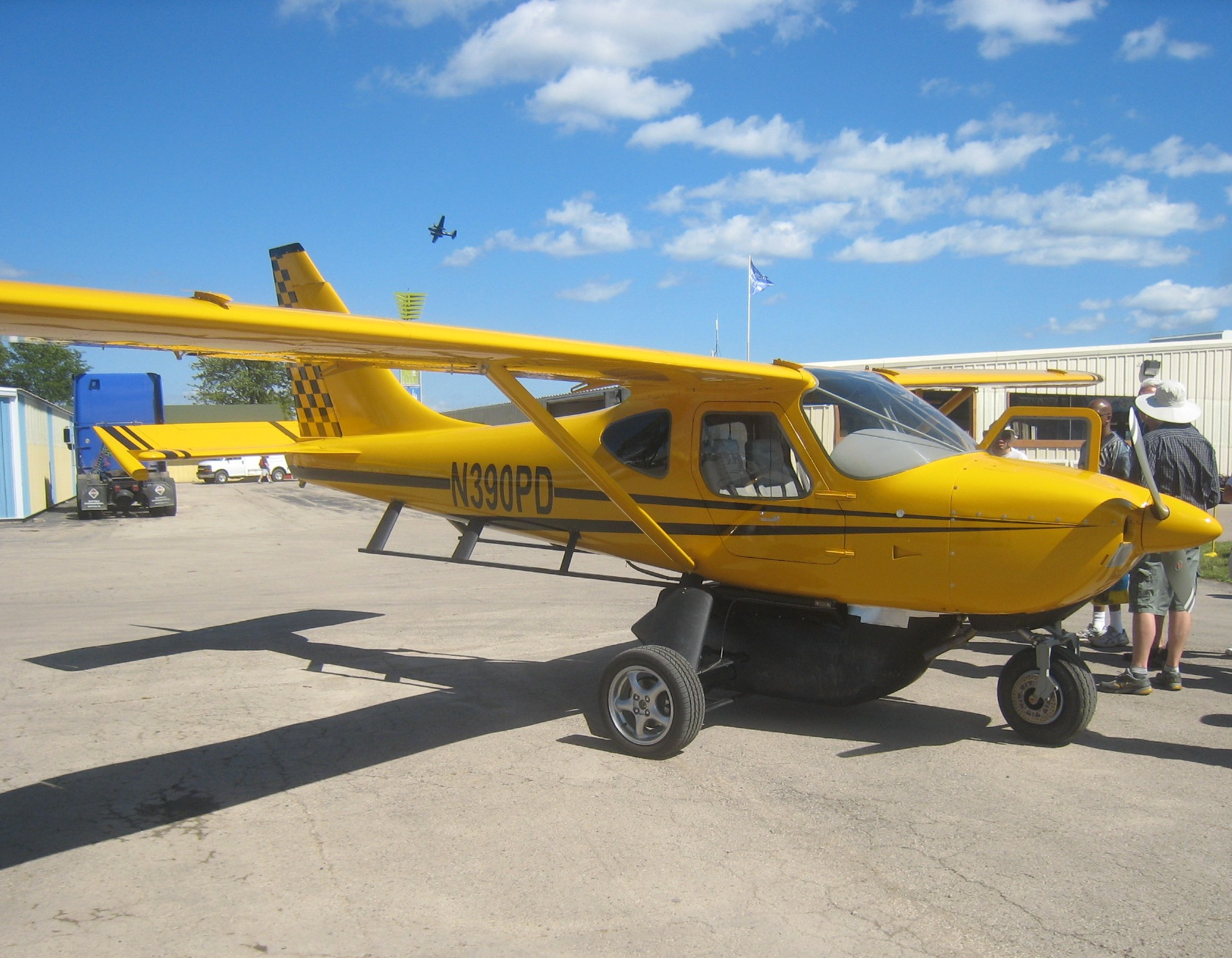
Plane Driven PD-1 Roadable Glastar

In 2009, the US Defense Advanced Research Projects Agency (DARPA) initiated a $65 million Transformer program to develop a four-person roadable aircraft by 2015. The vehicle was supposed to have VTOL capability and a 450-kilometre (280 mi) range. AAI Corporation and Lockheed Martin were awarded contracts, but the program was cancelled in 2013.

The Parajet Skycar utilises a paramotor for propulsion and a parafoil for lift. The main body consists of a modified dune buggy. It has a top speed of 130 km/h (80 mph) and a maximum range of 290 km (180 miles) in flight. On the ground, it has a top speed of 180 km/h (112 mph) and a maximum range of 401 km (249 miles). Parajet flew and drove its prototype from London to Timbuktu in January 2009.

The Maverick Flying Dune Buggy was designed by the Indigenous People's Technology and Education Center of Florida as an off-road vehicle that could unfurl an advanced parachute and then travel by air over impassable terrain when roadways were no longer usable. The 500-kilogram (1,100 lb) "Maverick" vehicle is powered by a 128 hp (95 kW) engine that can also drive a five-bladed pusher propeller. It was initially conceived in order to minister to remote Amazon rainforest communities, but would also be marketed for visual pipeline inspection and other similar activities in desolate areas or difficult terrain.

The Plane Driven PD-1 Roadable Glastar is a modification to the Glastar Sportsman GS-2 to make a practical roadable aircraft. The approach is novel in that it uses a mostly stock aircraft with a modified landing gear "pod" that carries the engine for road propulsion. The wings fold along the side, and the main landing gear and engine pod slide aft in driving configuration to compensate for the rearward center of gravity with the wings folded and provide additional stability for road travel.

The Super Sky Cycle was an American homebuilt roadable gyroplane designed and manufactured by The Butterfly LLC. It is a registered motorcycle.

At the 2014 Pioneers Festival at Wien (Austria) AeroMobil presented their version 3.0 of their flying car. The prototype was conceived as a vehicle that can be converted from an automobile to an aircraft. The version 2.5 proof-of-concept took 20 years to develop and first flew in 2013. CEO Juraj Vaculik said that the company planned to move flying cars to market: "the plan is that in 2017 we'll be able to announce ...the first flying roadster." In 2016, AeroMobil was test-flying a prototype that obtained Slovak ultralight certification. When the final product will be available or how much it will cost is not yet specified. In 2018, it unveiled a concept that resembled a flying sportscar with VTOL capability. The Aeromobil 2.5 has folding wings and a Rotax 912 engine. It can travel at 200 km/h (124 mph) with a range of 690 km (430 miles), and flew for the first time in 2013. On 29 October 2014, Slovak startup AeroMobil s.r.o. unveiled AeroMobil 3.0 at Vienna Pioneers Festival.

In Slovakia, Klein Vision developed the prototype AirCar, which drives like a sports car and for flight has a pusher propeller with twin tailbooms, and foldout wings. In June 2021, the prototype carried out a 35-minute flight between airports. It was type certified as an aircraft in January 2022.

The Terrafugia Transition is a roadable aircraft intended to be classed as a Personal Air Vehicle. It can fold its wings in 30 seconds and drive the front wheels, enabling it to operate both as a traditional road vehicle and as a general aviation aeroplane, with a range of 800 km (500 miles). An operational prototype was displayed at the AirVenture Oshkosh convention in 2008, and its first flight took place on 5 March 2009. It can carry two people plus luggage, and its Rotax 912S engine operates on premium unleaded gas. It was approved by the Federal Aviation Administration (FAA) in June 2010.

The production-ready single-engine, roadable PAL-V Liberty autogyro, or gyrocopter, debuted at the Geneva Motor Show in March 2018, then became the first flying car in production and was set to launch in 2020, with full production scheduled for 2021 in Gujarat, India. The PAL-V ONE is a hybrid of a gyrocopter with a leaning 3-wheel motorcycle. It has two seats and a 210-horsepower (160 kW) flight certified gasoline engine. It has a top speed of 180 km/h (112 mph) on land and in air, and weighs 910 kg (2,010 lb) max.

On 15 April 2021, Los Altos, California became home to the first consumer flying car showroom; however, there are no certified flying cars currently in production.

In 2023, Doroni Aerospace earned an official FAA Airworthiness Certification for its prototype. Powered by ten independent propulsion systems, the company claimed a top speed of 230 km/h (140 mph) and a 97-kilometre (60 mi) range. It includes two electric motors with patented ducted propellers. The machine is 7 m (23 ft) long and4.3 m (14 ft) wide.

On 9 December 2025, Alef Aeronautics said that it had begun production of its Model A Ultralight car. Alef describes it as a "drive and fly vehicle", designed to lift off directly from the road and fly over traffic. The website Flying noted that Alef have yet to provide video evidence that the vehicle could transition into flight.

== Design ==
A flying car must be capable of safe and reliable operation both on public roads and in the air. Current types require manual control by both a driver and a pilot. For mass adoption, it would also need to be environmentally friendly, able to fly without a fully qualified pilot at the controls, and come at affordable purchase and running costs.

Design configurations vary widely from modified road vehicles, such as the AVE Mizar at one extreme, to modified aircraft, such as the Plane Driven PD-1 at the other. Most are dedicated flying car designs. The Alef Model A project offers an unusual configuration in which the body of the car is hollow and the sides are slabs; in the air, it rolls sideways so that the slabs become a biplane wing, while the cabin remains upright.

Most flying cars are designed to drive on the road with wheels in the conventional way: however, a few designs use the aircraft propeller in similar manner to an airboat, but this is inefficient. Jet engines are not used in roadable aircraft due to the ground hazard posed by the hot, high-velocity exhaust stream.

=== Lift ===
While wheeled propulsion is necessary on the road, lift in flight can be provided by a fixed wing, spinning rotor, or direct powered lift, much like other aircraft. The powered helicopter rotor and direct lift both offer VTOL capability, while the fixed wing and autogyro rotor take off conventionally from a runway.

The simplest and earliest approach was to take a driveable car and attach removable flying surfaces and a propeller. However, when on the road, such a design must either tow its removable parts on a separate trailer or leave them behind and drive back to them before taking off again. Other conventional takeoff fixed-wing designs, such as the Terrafugia Transition, include folding wings that the car carries with it when driven on the road.

Vertical takeoff and landing is ideal, because it avoids the need for a runway and greatly increases operational flexibility. Typical designs to achieve this effect include rotorcraft and ducted fan powered lift configurations; however, most design concepts have inherent problems. For example, ducted-fan aircraft, such as the Moller Skycar, tend to easily lose stability and have been unable to travel at greater than 30–40 knots (35–46 mph; 56–74 km/h).

Rotorcraft include helicopters with powered rotors and autogyros with free-spinning rotors. For road use, a rotor must, like many naval helicopters, be either two-bladed or foldable. The quadcopter requires only a simple control system with no tail. The autogyro relies on a separate thrust system to build up airspeed, spin the rotor, and generate lift. However, some autogyros have rotors that can be spun up on the ground and then disengaged, allowing the aircraft to jump-start vertically. The PAL-V Liberty is an example of the autogyro type.

=== Power ===
The flying car places unique demands on the vehicle powertrain. For a given all-up weight, an aero engine must deliver higher power than its typical road equivalent. However, on the road, the vehicle must handle well and not be overpowered. Power must also be diverted between the airborne and road drive mechanisms. Some designs therefore have multiple engines, with the road engine being supplemented, or even replaced by, additional flight engines.

As with other vehicles, power has traditionally been supplied by internal combustion engines, but electric power is undergoing rapid development: while electric road vehicles are seeing increasing use, the current weight of the batteries makes them unsuited to aircraft. The low environmental signature of electric power still makes it an attractive possibility for the anticipated use of flying cars for short trips in dense urban environments.

=== Safety ===
To operate safely, a flying car must be independently certified as both a road vehicle and an aircraft by the respective regulatory authorities. The operator must also be licensed as both a driver and a pilot, and the vehicle must be maintained according to the regulations of both categories.

Mechanically, the requirements for powered flight are so demanding that every opportunity must be taken to minimize weight. Consequently, a typical airframe is lightweight and easily damaged. In contrast, a road vehicle must endure significant impact loads from minor incidents while stationary, as well as low-speed and high-speed collisions, which requires a durability that can significantly increase weight; therefore, a practical flying car must be strong enough to meet road safety standards while remaining light enough for flight. Additionally, any propeller or rotor blade poses a risk to pedestrians when on the ground, especially if it is spinning, so these components must be completely shrouded or retracted upon landing.

For the vision of widespread flying car adoption, it is impractical for every driver to qualify as a pilot, and the rigorous maintenance currently required for aircraft would be economically unfeasible. To improve their viability, flying cars would benefit from becoming autonomous.

Computer systems in these vehicles will be required to de-skill piloting; such skills include aircraft manoeuvring, navigation, and emergency procedures, all in potentially crowded airspace. The onboard control system also needs to be capable of interacting with other systems such as air traffic control and collision-risk monitoring. A practical flying car may need to be capable of full autonomy, in which people are present only as passengers. To manage the inevitable periodic failures and emergency landings, sufficient designated landing sites would need to be established across urban areas. In addition, poor weather conditions could make the craft unsafe to fly.

The European Union's Aviation Safety Agency and the FAA in the US are continuing to develop guidelines for flying cars, in anticipation of the risks that would arise with widespread use of personal air vehicles: compliance with these regulations will be a necessary part of developing and implementing flying cars safely.

=== Environment ===
A flying car capable of widespread use must operate acceptably within a heavily populated urban environment. The lift and propulsion systems must be quiet enough not to cause a nuisance, and must not create excessive pollution. For example, pollution emissions standards for road vehicles must be met. The clear environmental benefits of electric power are a strong incentive for its development.

=== Cost ===
At present, the need for propulsion systems to be both small and powerful, vehicle structures to be both light and strong, and control systems to be fully integrated and autonomous, can only be met using advanced and expensive technologies. This cost-factor may pose a significant barrier to widespread adoption of flying cars.

Flying cars would most likely be used for relatively short distances at high frequency, such as daily commuting. They also travel at lower speeds and altitudes than conventional passenger aircraft; however, optimal fuel efficiency for airplanes is obtained at higher speeds and altitudes, so a flying car's energy efficiency will be lower than that of a conventional aircraft. Similarly, the flying car's road performance is compromised by the requirements of flight and the need to carry around the various extra parts, so it is also less economical than a conventional motor car.

== Flying car associations ==
In April 2012, the International Flying Car Association was established to be the "central resource center for information and communication between the flying car industry, news networks, governments, and those seeking further information worldwide". Because flying cars need practical regulations that are mostly dealt with on a regional level, several regional associations were established as well, with the European Flying Car Association (EFCA) representing these national member associations on a pan-European level (51 independent countries, including the European Union Member States, the Accession Candidates, and Russia, Switzerland, Turkey, and Ukraine). The associations also organize racing competitions for roadable aircraft in Europe, such as the European Roadable Aircraft Prix (ERAP), primarily to increase awareness about this type of aircraft among a broader audience.

== List of flying cars and roadable aircraft ==
Type	Country	Class	Date	Status	No.	Notes
Aerauto PL.5C	Italy	Folding wings	1949	Flown	1	
Aerocar	US	Detachable wings	1946	Flown	5	Also known as the "Taylor Aerocar". 4 Aerocars and one Aerocar III built (The Mk. II was not a flying car).
Aerocar 2000	US	Detachable wings	2000 approx.	Flown		
AeroMobil	Slovakia	Folding wings	2013	Flown		v3.0 crashed, 4.0 under development
Alef Model A	US	Tilting biplane	2023	Unbuilt	0	Attracted significant investment.
Audi Pop.Up Next	Germany	Quadcopter	2018	Unbuilt	1	
Autogiro Company of America AC-35	US	Autogyro	1935	Flown	1	
AVE Mizar	US	Detachable wings	1971	Flown	1	
Bel Geddes' "Motorcar No. 9."	US	Folding wings	1945	Unbuilt		Concept
Bristol Siddeley flying car	UK	Ducted fan	1960	Unbuilt		Concept
Bryan Autoplane	US	Folding wings	1953	Flown	2	Model II converted to Model III.
Butterfly Super Sky Cycle	US	Autogyro	2009	Flown		Homebuilt autogyro. Registered motorcycle
Convair Model 116 ConVairCar	US	Detachable wings	1946	Flown	1	
Convair Model 118 ConVairCar	US	Detachable wings	1947	Flown	2	Second vehicle re-used the aircraft section from the first.
Curtiss Autoplane	US	Detachable wings	1917	Not flown	1	Achieved short hops
Dixon Flying Ginny	US	Helicopter	1940	Flown	1	Co-axial rotor.
Ebner Air Car	US	Ducted Fan	1985		1	Concept
Ford Volante	US	Ducted fan	1958	Unbuilt		Concept
Fulton Airphibian	US	Detachable wings	1946	Flown	4	
Gluhareff' "Air-Car"	US	Rotary tip jet wings	1959	Unbuilt		Concept
Hafner Rotabuggy	UK	Detachable rotor	1942	Flown		Willys MB jeep, air-towed as a rotor kite.
Handley Page HP.120	UK	Lift fan	1961	Unflown		2-man VTOL convertible "Jumping Jeep" project
I-TEC Maverick	US	Parafoil	2008	Flown		
Klein Vision AirCar	Slovakia	Folding wings	2021	Flown	1	Production model in development.
Lebouder Autoplane	France	Detachable wings	1973	Flown	1	Won prizes.
Moller M400 Skycar	US	Vectored fan	1960s	Not flown		Unsuccessful as of 2019
Monster Garage "Red Baron"	US	Detachable wings	2005	Flown	1	Based on a Panoz Esperante sports car, with detachable airframe.
PAL-V Liberty	Netherlands	Autogyro	2012	Flown		Production model under development.
Parajet Skycar	UK	Parafoil	2008	Flown	1	
Piasecki VZ-8 Airgeep	US	Ducted rotor	1959	Flown		VTOL "flying jeep".
Plane Driven PD-1	US	Folding wings	2010	Flown	2	Modified Glasair Sportsman 2+2 aircraft. The second prototype is designated the PD-2.
Samson Switchblade	US	Folding wings	2023	Flown	1	
Scaled Composites Model 367 BiPod	US	Detachable wings	2011	Not flown	1	Twin-fuselage technology development vehicle. Not flown.
Skroback Roadable Airplane	US	Multiplane	1925	Not flown	1	
SkyRider X2R	US			Unbuilt		
Terrafugia Transition	US	Folding wings	2009	Flown		
Terrafugia TF-X	US	Hybrid		Unbuilt		VTOL convertiplane with folding wings and rotors.
Urban Aeronautics X-Hawk	Israel			Unbuilt		VTOL. Under development.
Vlachos Triphibian	US		1936			
Wagner Aerocar	Germany	Helicopter	1965	Flown		
Waterman Arrowbile	US	Folding wings	1935	Flown	1	
Whitehead No. 21	US	Folding wings	1901	Not flown	1	Historians dismiss claims that Whitehead's machine ever flew.

== Popular culture ==
=== Anticipation ===
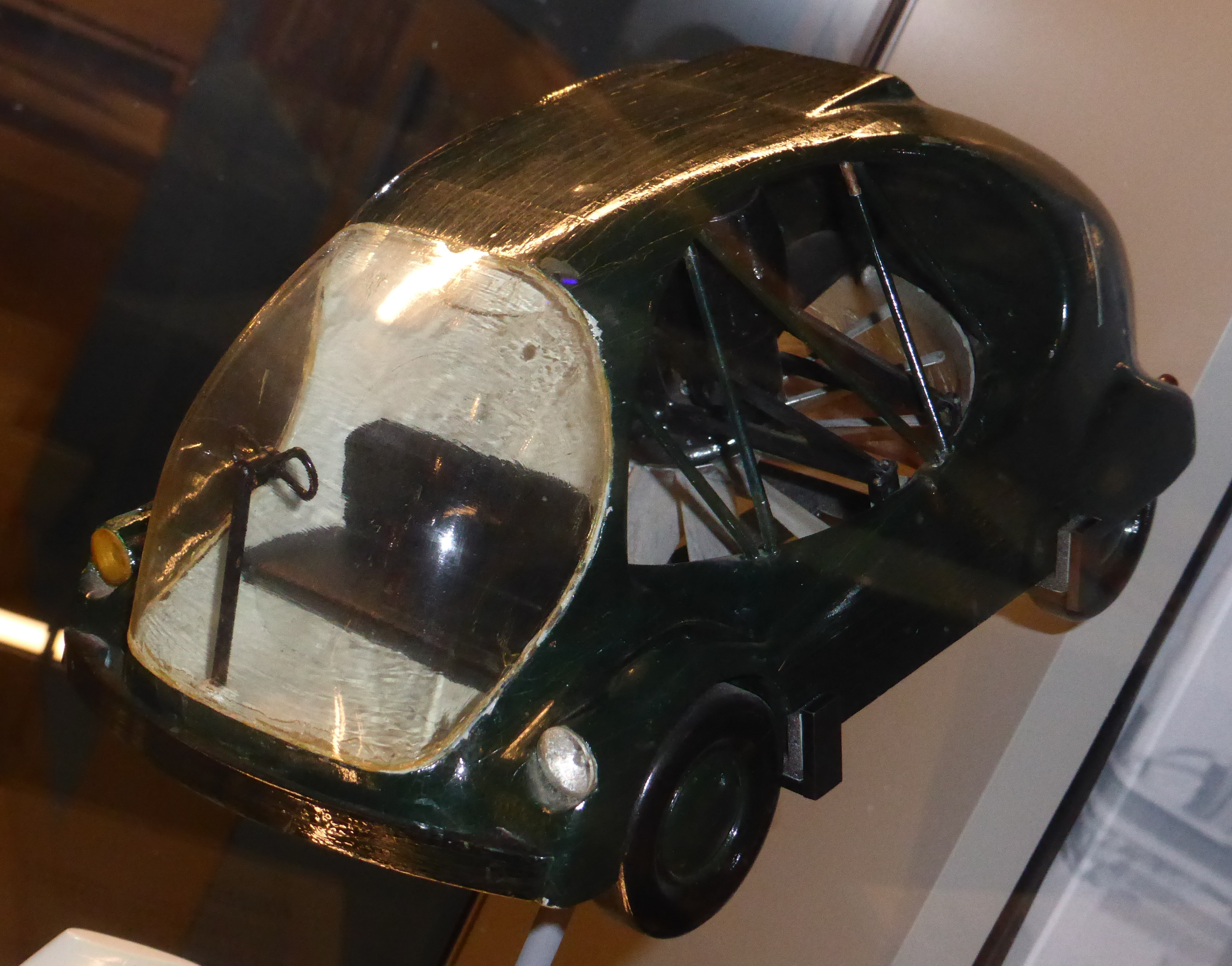
Bristol Siddeley flying car model

The flying car was and remains a common feature of conceptions of the future, both predicted and imaginary. Flying cars have been under development since the early days of motor transport and aviation, and many futurologists have predicted their imminent arrival. Aircraft manufacturer Glenn Curtiss unveiled his unflyable Autoplane in 1917. In 1940, vehicle manufacturer Henry Ford predicted that; "Mark my word: a combination airplane and motorcar is coming. You may smile, but it will come."

From 1945, industrial designer Norman Bel Geddes promoted his concept for a streamlined flying car with folding wings. In the late 1950s, Ford's Advanced Design studio publicised a 3/8 scale concept car model, the Volante Tri-Athodyne. It featured three ducted fans, each with its own motor, that would theoretically lift it off the ground and move it through the air. Ford admitted that "the day where there will be an aero-car in every garage is still some time off", but suggesting, "the Volante indicates one direction that the styling of such a vehicle would take".

=== Failure to launch ===
Despite a century of anticipation, no flying car prototypes have managed to become a practical proposition, and they remain an experimental curiosity. This long-term failure to make an impact on society has led to the idiom, "Where's my flying car?" and other variations of the phrase; typically used to reflect disappointment about unrealised speculative technologies or other idealistic visions for the future.

Here we are, less than a month until the turn of the millennium, and what I want to know is, what happened to the flying cars? We're about to become Americans of the 21st century. People have been predicting what we'd be like for more than 100 years, and our accoutrements don't entirely live up to expectations. ... Our failure to produce flying cars seems like a particular betrayal since it was so central to our image.

— Gail Collins, (1999)

This new millennium sucks! It's exactly the same as the old millennium! You know why? No flying cars!

— Lewis Black, (2018)

The question "Where's my flying car?" has become emblematic of the failure of many modern technologies to match the expectations raised by the futuristic visions promoted in earlier decades.

=== Flying cars in fiction ===
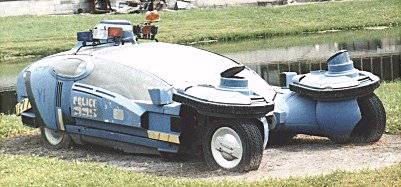
Blade Runner Spinner prop car at Disney/MGM Studios

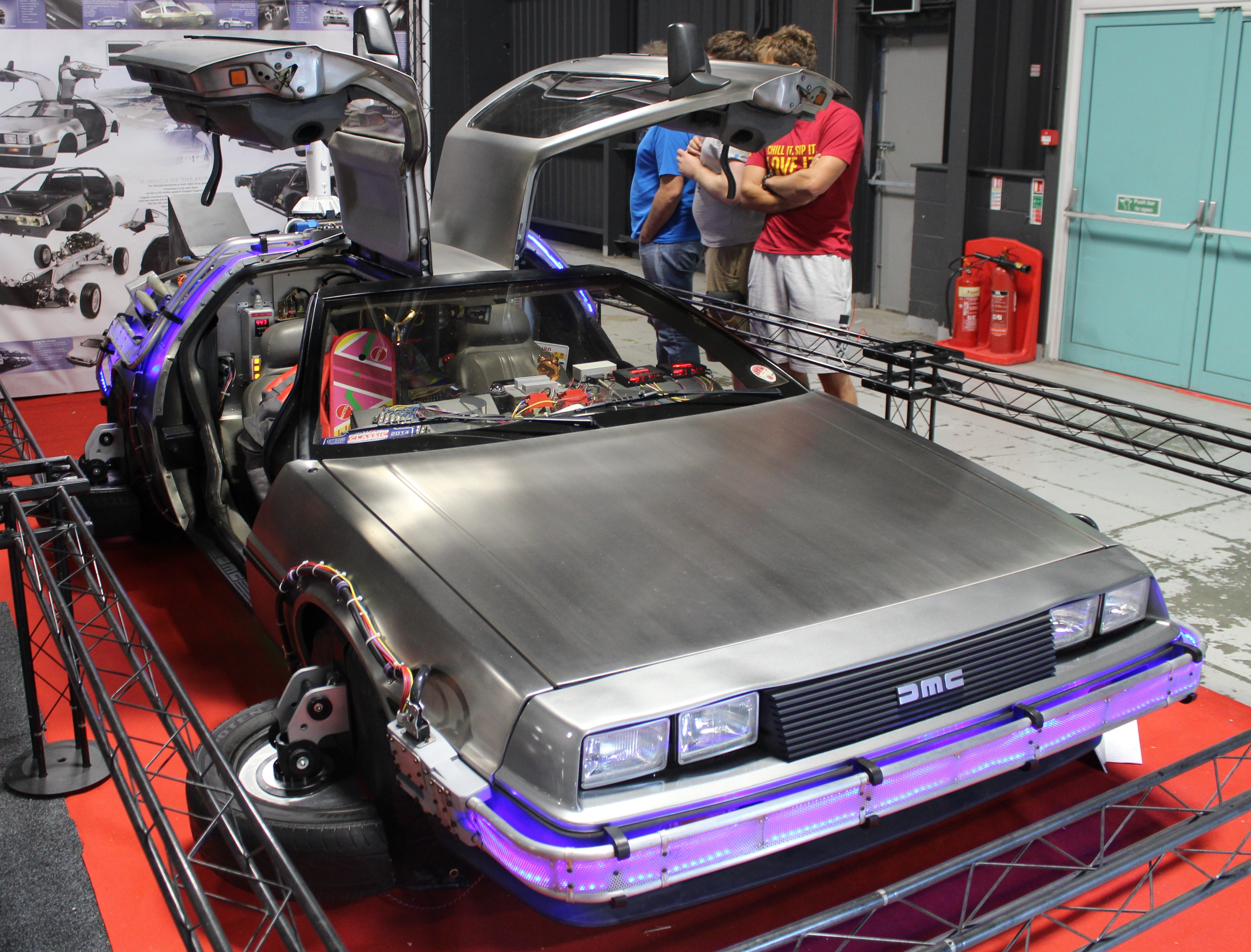
The time machine DeLorean of Back to the Future in flying configuration with doors open

The flying car has been depicted in many works of fantasy and science fiction. Some notable examples include:

- In Jules Verne's 1904 novel Maître du monde, engineer Robur has created a vehicle that can drive on land as a car, navigate on and under water, and fly through the air.
- Supercar was a children's TV show that aired in the United Kingdom between 1961 and 1962. The car was jet-powered with VTOL capability, and it hovered on the road rather than using wheels. Created by Gerry Anderson, it was the first show to credit his supermarionation puppet technology.
- The Jetsons was an American animated cartoon sitcom that originally aired from 1962 to 1963. It featured flying cars as ubiquitous technology which typically had a large bubble roof: a design inspired by a Ford concept road car from 1954, the FX-Atmos.
- The 1968 film Chitty Chitty Bang Bang features a car that flies via magic.
- A flying 1974 AMC Matador coupe features in The Man with the Golden Gun (1974), the ninth in the James Bond film series. The Matador coupe is transformed into an aeroplane in similar manner to the AVE Mizar: by attaching a large wing with engine and tail unit to the car. In aircraft configuration it is 9.15 m (30 ft) long, 12.80 m (42 ft) in span and 3.08 m (10 ft) high. The film prop was not airworthy and a 1 m (39 in)-long remote control model was used for the aerial sequences.
- In the original 1982 Blade Runner films, flying cars are called spinners and have vertical take-off and landing (VTOL) capability. The vehicle was conceived and designed by Syd Mead, who described it as an "aerodyne"—a vehicle which directs air downward to create lift. However, press kits for the film stated that the spinner was propelled by three engines: "conventional internal combustion, jet, and anti-gravity". A Spinner prop is on permanent exhibit at the Science Fiction Museum and Hall of Fame in Seattle, Washington.
- In the Back to the Future film trilogy (1985, 1989, and 1990), the DeLorean time machine car was modified to be capable of normal flight.
- In the 1997 film The Fifth Element, as with The Jetsons, flying cars are used as the primary mode of personal transport. The production design for the film was developed by French comics creators Jean Giraud and Jean-Claude Mézières. Director Luc Besson had been inspired by Mézières' book The Circles of Power.

== See also ==
- Amphibious automobile
- Intermodal passenger transport
- Hovercar
