= Aerocar (disambiguation) =

Aero Car or Aerocar may refer to:

== Automobiles ==
- Aerocar (1905 automobile), an American automobile built from 1905 to 1908
- Aero Car (1919 automobile), a British 5/7 hp (533 W) flat twin-engine cyclecar manufactured from 1919 to 1920
- Aero Car (1921 automobile), a planned American automobile

== Flying cars ==
- Aerocar (1949–1956), several working "flying cars" (roadable aircraft)
- Wagner Aerocar, a roadable helicopter completed in 1965
- Aerocar 2000, a roadable aircraft currently in development in the US
- Klein Vision AirCar (2020-Present), a certified two-seat real flying car designed by Štefan Klein
- AeroMobil s.r.o. AeroMobil, sereral working "flying cars" produced 1990-Present

== Light aircraft ==
- Portsmouth Aerocar, a British light utility aircraft design of the late 1940s

== Companies ==
- Aerocar International, the company that built the Aerocar as well as:
  - Aerocar Aero-Plane, an unusual light aircraft flown in the US in 1964
  - Aerocar Coot, a two-seat amphibious aircraft first flown in 1969, designed for homebuilding by Moulton Taylor
  - Aerocar Micro-IMP, a light sportsplane developed from the successful Mini-IMP homebuilt in 1978
- Niagara Aero Car Company, which built the Whirlpool Aero Car, an attraction at Niagara Falls, in 1913

== See also ==
- Aircar (disambiguation)
- Flying car (disambiguation)
- Skycar (disambiguation)
- John Emery Harriman, designer
