= Convair Model 116 =

American prototype roadable aircraft

Model 116 ConVairCar
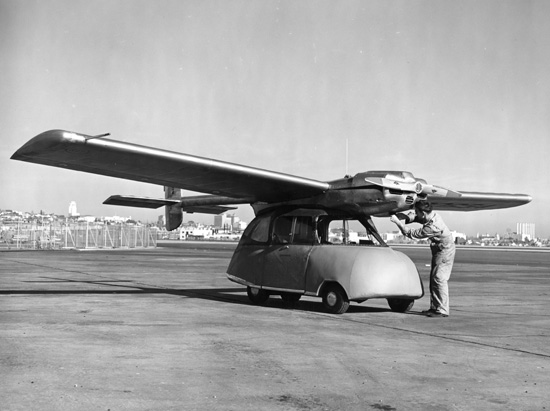
- Model 116

General information
- Type: Roadable aircraft
- National origin: United States
- Manufacturer: Convair
- Designer: Ted Hall
- Number built: 1

History
- First flight: July 12, 1946
- Variant: Convair Model 118

The Boeing Model 116 ConvAirCar was a prototype roadable aircraft that was intended to exploit the post-war aviation market. The vehicle was further developed into the Convair Model 118, but neither type achieved production status.

== Design and development ==
Consolidated Vultee Aircraft (later Convair) like many other manufacturers, had anticipated the post-war aviation boom would require a commercially viable product. Aircraft engineer and designer Theodore P. "Ted" Hall who had studied the concept of a flying car before World War II, with Consolidated, had unsuccessfully proposed the idea for use in commando-type raids.

Following the end of the War, Hall and Tommy Thompson designed and developed the Convair Model 116 featured in Popular Mechanics magazine in 1946. The Model 116 consisted of a two-seat car body, powered by a rear-mounted 26 hp (19 kW) engine, with detachable monoplane wings and tail boom, fitted with their own tractor configuration 90 hp (67 kW) Franklin 4A4 (later 95 hp 4AL) engine driving a two bladed wooden propeller.

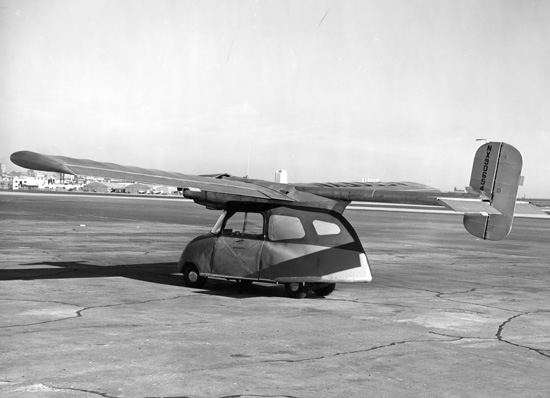
The Convair Model 116

== Operational history ==
The Model 116 (NX90654) flew on July 12, 1946, with pilot Russell Rogers at the controls. The sole prototype completed 66 test flights. Hall subsequently designed a more sophisticated development of the Model 116, with a more refined car body and a more powerful "flight" engine known as the Model 118 (which also bore the name "ConvAirCar"). Two examples of the Model 118 flew in 1947 and after a crash of the first prototype, the second continued with the test program, but enthusiasm for the project waned and Convair cancelled the program. The rights of both the Model 116/118 reverted to Hall, who formed T.R Hall Engineering Corp., but the definitive Model 118 in its new incarnation, never achieved production status.

== Specifications (Model 116) ==
Data from General Dynamics Aircraft and their Predecessors

General characteristics

- Powerplant: 1 × Franklin 4A4 air-cooled flat-four, 90 hp (67 kW)
- Powerplant: 1 × Crosley air-cooled, 26 hp (19 kW) (powered the car body)

Performance

- Maximum speed: 112.5 mph (181.1 km/h, 97.8 kn)

== See also ==
- Flying car (aircraft)

Aircraft of comparable role, configuration, and era

- Aerocar
- Aerocar 2000
- Fulton Airphibian
- Parajet Skycar
- Terrafugia Transition
