= Aerocar International =

Defunct American motor vehicle manufacturer

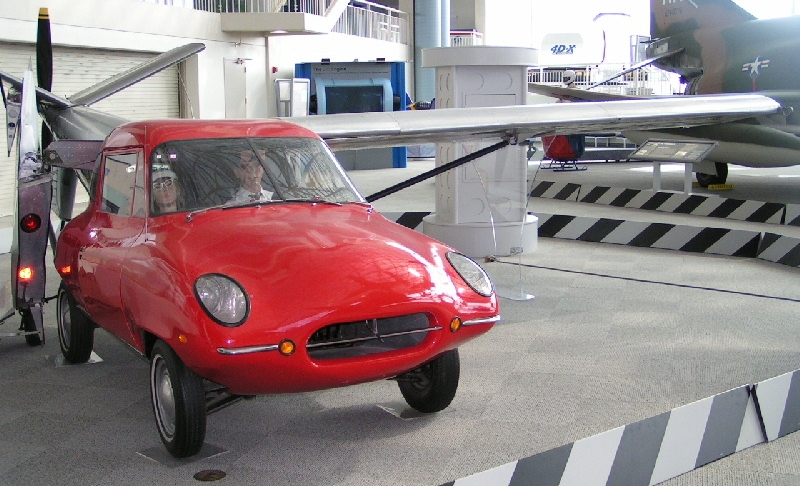
- Taylor Aerocar III on display at the Museum of Flight
- Industry: Automobile
- Defunct: 1960s
- Key people: Moulton Taylor
- Products: Flying automobiles 'An idea before its time'

Aerocar International was a roadable aircraft manufacturer, founded by Moulton Taylor in Longview, Washington. Work continued until the late 1960s, when changing legislation made Taylor's designs impractical.

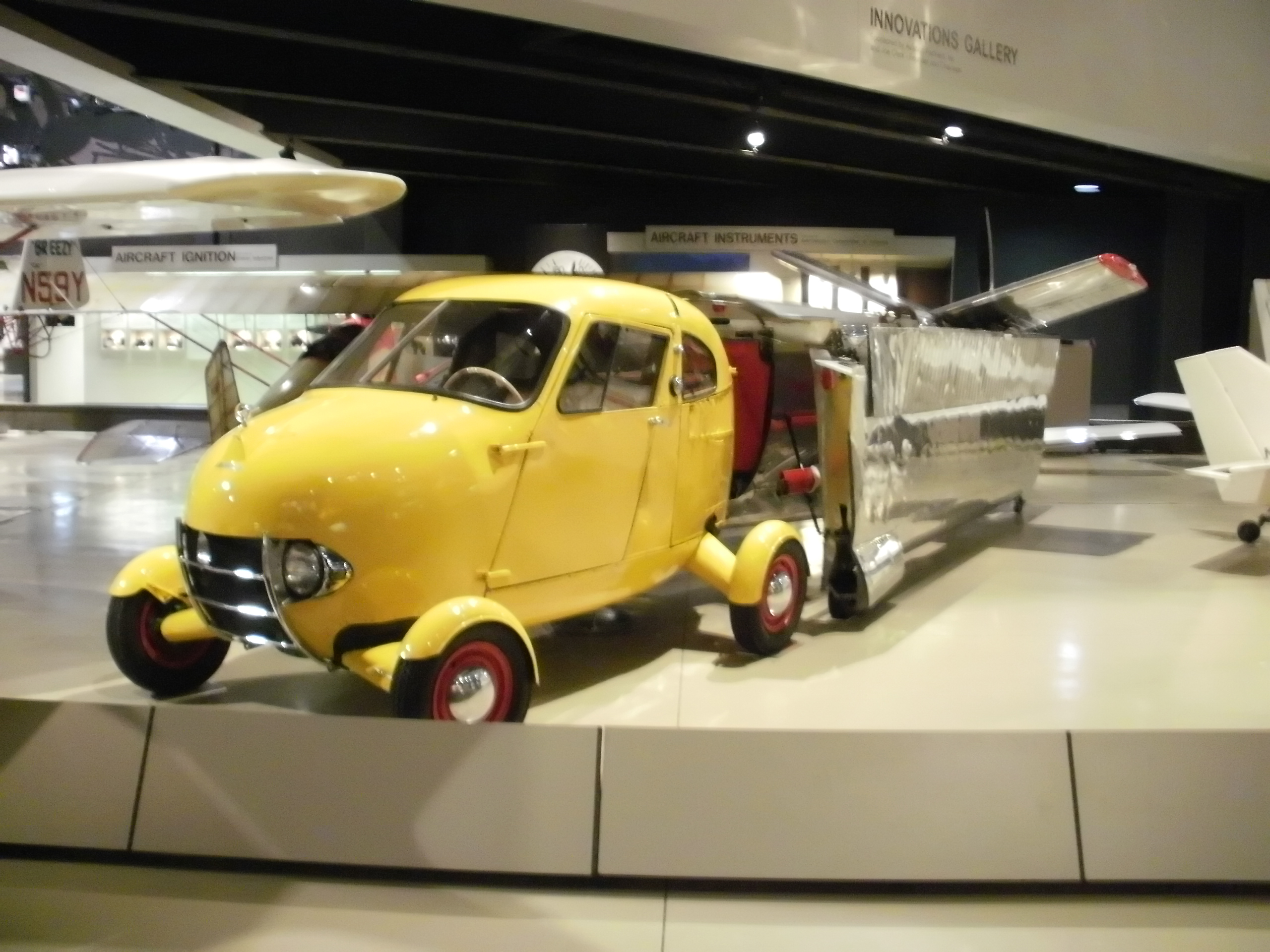
Taylor Aerocar displayed at the EAA Aviation Museum

== History and background ==
Moulton Taylor was a former naval commander, and is credited with flying and demonstrating the first guided missile. In 1947, he produced the first conceptual drawings for the Aerocar, and in 1948, he began development. The first model built was backed with a $50,000 investment from 49 investors. The first Aerocars were manufactured on a custom basis, and were priced at $12,000, approximately $7000 more than the cheapest light plane in 1951. There were seven Aerocars built from 1950 through 1967, in two different versions. The interior in both versions were cramped, with only fourteen cubic feet of baggage space over the engine compartment. Aerocar I had the capability to cruise at 100+ mph and its range was 300 miles on a 23.5 gallon fuel tank. On the road, its speed was 55-60 mph.

Moulton wanted to mass produce the Aerocar in order to make it more affordable, so he entered into an agreement with Ling-Temco Enterprises in 1961, in Dallas, Texas for production. According to Moulton, the company accepted $278,000 in pre-order deposits and absconded with the money. Taylor sued the company and was involved in a two-year lawsuit in an attempt to retrieve the money. Taylor was never successful in producing the Aerocar on a mass scale, he says, because of the Federal Aviation Administration and their costly regulations, which would govern the industry.

== Aircraft ==
- Aerocar I (1949) – Single-engine two-seat roadable aircraft. 135 hp (101 kW) aircraft engine
- Aerocar Aero-Plane (1964) – Aircraft-only derivative of Aerocar I. 143 hp (107 kW) aircraft engine
- Aerocar III – Reworked fuselage derivative of Aerocar I. 143 hp (107 kW) aircraft engine. One produced
- Aerocar Coot (1969) – Single-engine two-seat floatplane with pusher propeller
- Aerocar IMP – Single-engine four-seat pusher aircraft
- Aerocar Mini-IMP – Single-engine single-seat smaller version of IMP
- Aerocar Bullet – Single-engine two-seat version of IMP
- Aerocar Micro-IMP (1981) – Single-engine single-seat smaller version of Mini-IMP
- Aerocar Ultra-IMP (1987) – Development of Micro-IMP with ultralight aircraft engine. One produced

== See also ==
- Aerocar 2000, a roadable aircraft currently in development in the United States
