= Skycar =

Skycar may refer to:

- Pitts Sky Car, an early (1928) attempt at vertical take-off flight by US inventor John W. Pitts.
- Stout Skycar, a series of four one-off light aircraft designed by William Bushnell Stout in the 1930s.
- Moller Skycar M400 a prototype American flying car
- OMA SUD Skycar an Italian four-seat piston engined aircraft
- Parajet Skycar a British parafoil dune buggy

== See also ==
- Aerocar (disambiguation)
- Aircar (disambiguation)
- Flying car (disambiguation)
