= Holcomb Perigee =

Prototype airplane built in 1987

Perigee

General information
- Type: Sport aircraft
- Manufacturer: Jerry Holcomb
- Number built: 1

The Holcomb Perigee was a prototype sportsplane built in the United States in 1987 by Jerry Holcomb. Originally known as the Ultra-IMP, it was a refinement of the Aerocar Micro-IMP and attempted to overcome the major shortcoming of that design – a lack of power – by replacing the adapted automobile engine that had been used in its predecessor with an engine designed to power ultralights.

== Development and design ==
In 1972, Moulton Taylor, designer of the Aerocar flying car and the Coot home-built flying boat, began work on a new two-seat Pusher configuration light aircraft intended for easy homebuilding, the Aerocar IMP, but delays in obtaining the intended engine resulted in priority being switched to a smaller, single-seat derivative, the Aerocar Mini-IMP, which was successfully flying by early 1976, with plans available for sale later that year. In 1978, Taylor began work on the Micro-IMP, a derivative of the Mini-IMP built using Taylor Paper Glass (TPG), a fibreglass-reinforced paper, consisting of a paper core with metal inlays covered with glassfibre in a matrix of polyester resin and covered with Dacron fabric. The Micro-IMP first flew in 1981, but while the novel construction material proved to be a success, the aircraft, with an engine from a Citroen 2CV car, originally generating 18 hp (13 kW) and later uprated to 20 hp (15 kW), was underpowered.

Work began on a new single-seat home-built design of TPG construction, the Ultra-IMP, in December 1983, but the programme was taken over by Jerry Holcomb in 1984, after Taylor suffered a stroke, and renamed the Holcomb Perigee.

The Perigee is a shoulder-wing pusher monoplane, with the strut braced wings having an aluminium alloy and TPG mainspar, a spruce and TPG rear spar, and wooden ribs. The wings could be removed for easy storage and transport. The streamlined semi-monocoque fuselage had spruce longerons, but was otherwise of largely TPG construction, and housed an enclosed cockpit for the pilot. The aircraft had a fixed tailwheel landing gear and a Y-shaped tail, with the tailwheel attached to the ventral fin. The prototype Perigee is powered by a 35 hp (26 kW) Cuyuna 430{{#tag:ref|Cuyuna was one of the most important builders of engines for ultralight aircraft at the time. (Note: Taylor 1987, p. 947.) two-stroke engine located immediately behind the cockpit driving a two-bladed ground-adjustable propeller via a long propshaft. Rotax engines were proposed for amateur builders.

Holcomb began construction of the prototype began in February 1984, and it made its first flight in 4 April 1987. A total of 22 sets of plans had been sold by February 1988.

== Specifications ==
Data from Jane's All the World's Aircraft 1987–88

General characteristics

- Crew: 1
- Length: 15 ft 0 in (4.57 m)
- Wingspan: 28 ft 0 in (8.53 m)
- Height: 4 ft 10 in (1.47 m)
- Wing area: 81.0 sq ft (7.53 m^{2})
- Aspect ratio: 9.3:1
- Airfoil: GA(PC)-1 modified
- Empty weight: 350 lb (159 kg)
- Max takeoff weight: 650 lb (295 kg)
- Fuel capacity: 7 US gal (5.8 imp gal; 26 L)
- Powerplant: 1 × Cuyuna 430 two-cylinder, two-stroke engine, 35 hp (26 kW)
- Propellers: 2-bladed

Performance

- Maximum speed: 120 mph (190 km/h, 100 kn)
- Cruise speed: 100 mph (160 km/h, 87 kn)
- Stall speed: 40 mph (64 km/h, 35 kn)
- Never exceed speed: 160 mph (260 km/h, 140 kn)
- Range: 250 mi (400 km, 220 nmi)
- Service ceiling: 12,500 ft (3,800 m)
- g limits: +6, -4
- Rate of climb: 850 ft/min (4.3 m/s)

== See also ==
Related development

- IMP
- Mini-IMP
- Micro-IMP
