= Aerocar IMP =

Unconventional light aircraft

General information
- Type: Light aircraft
- National origin: United States
- Manufacturer: Aerocar International
- Designer: Moulton Taylor
- Status: Abandoned project

The Aerocar IMP (for Independently Made Plane) was an unconventional light aircraft designed by Moulton Taylor and marketed for homebuilding. The IMP and its various derivatives were developed by Taylor's Aerocar business after he had already established himself in the homebuilt market with the Coot amphibian, and at the time of the energy crisis in the United States, were designed to be economical to build and operate.

The IMP was unconventional in configuration in having a pusher propeller powered by a long driveshaft from an engine mounted midway within the fuselage of the aircraft. This provided an aerodynamic advantage over more traditional pusher arrangements by allowing greater streamlining of the fuselage – giving the IMP the appearance of an elongated teardrop. The aircraft's most visually striking feature, however, is its inverted V-tail.

Originally designed as a four-seat aircraft, the original IMP design proved to be too complex and expensive for the market that Taylor was aiming for, and although it was awarded a type certification by the FAA, development was abandoned in favour of scaled-down, single-seat version dubbed the Mini-IMP.

== Specifications (Brown Ascent Super 2 - performance estimated) ==
Data from Jane's All the World's Aircraft 1987–88

General characteristics

- Crew: 1
- Capacity: 1 adult + 2 children
- Length: 22 ft 6 in (6.86 m)
- Wingspan: 29 ft 0 in (8.84 m)
- Height: 7 ft 6 in (2.29 m)
- Wing area: 112.0 sq ft (10.41 m^{2})
- Aspect ratio: 7.5:1
- Airfoil: NASA GA(PC)-1
- Empty weight: 1,300 lb (590 kg)
- Max takeoff weight: 1,800 lb (816 kg) (design)
- Fuel capacity: 28 US gal (23 imp gal; 110 L)
- Powerplant: 1 × Franklin , 130 hp (97 kW)
- Propellers: 2-bladed controllable-pitch propeller, 6 ft 0 in (1.83 m) diameter

Performance

- Maximum speed: 180 mph (290 km/h, 160 kn)
- Stall speed: 41 mph (66 km/h, 36 kn)
- Rate of climb: 1,013 ft/min (5.15 m/s)

== See also ==
Related development

- Holcomb Perigee
- Micro-IMP
- Mini-IMP
