= Convair =

1943–1996 American aerospace manufacturer

Consolidated Vultee Convair
- Industry: Aircraft, Aerospace
- Predecessor: Consolidated Aircraft; Vultee Aircraft
- Founded: 1943; 83 years ago
- Defunct: 1996; 30 years ago
- Fate: Operations permanently shut down
- Headquarters: San Diego, California, U.S.
- Parent: Aviation Corporation (1943–1947); Atlas Corporation (1947–1954); General Dynamics (1954–1996)

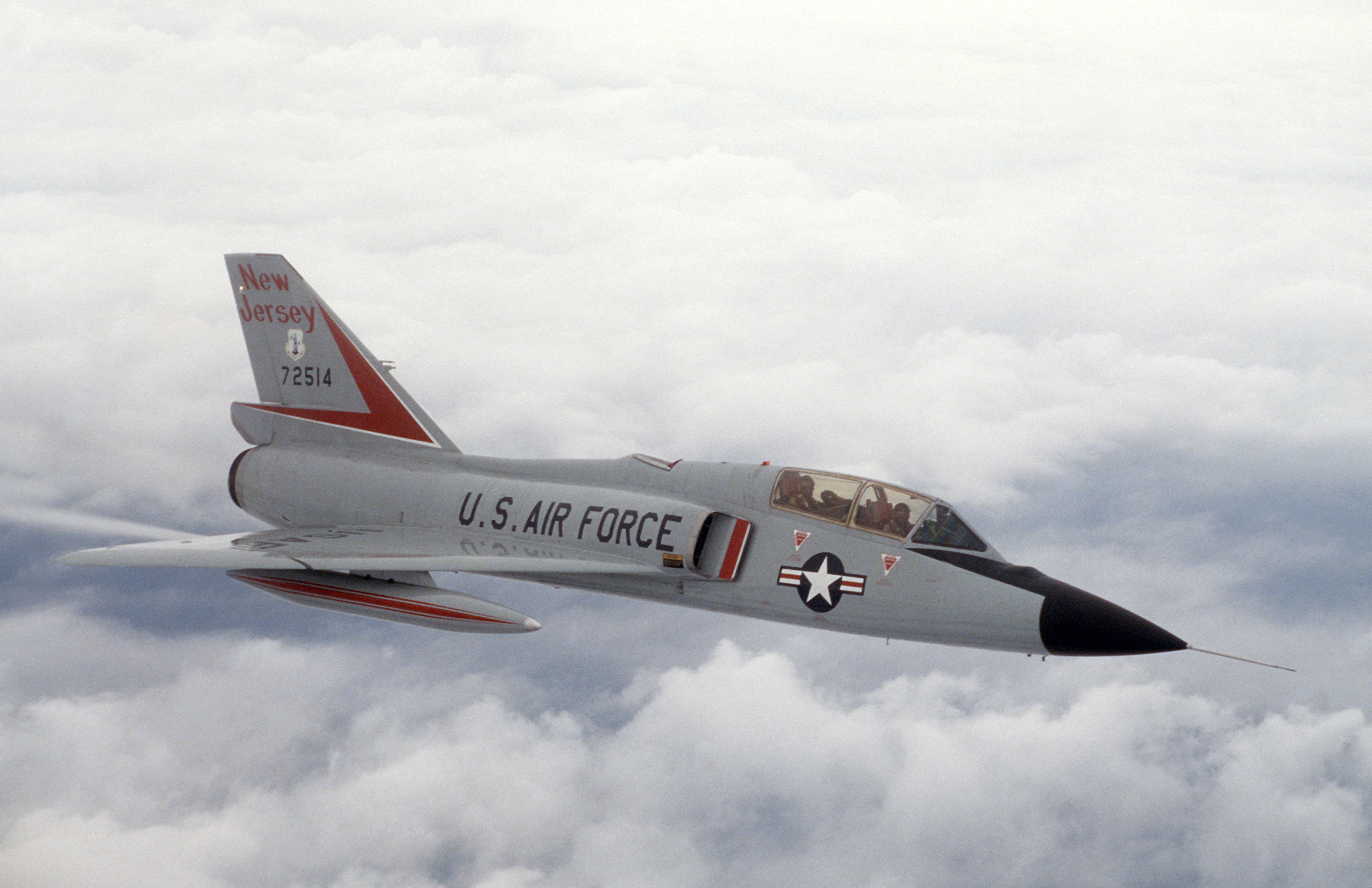
Convair F-106 Delta Dart

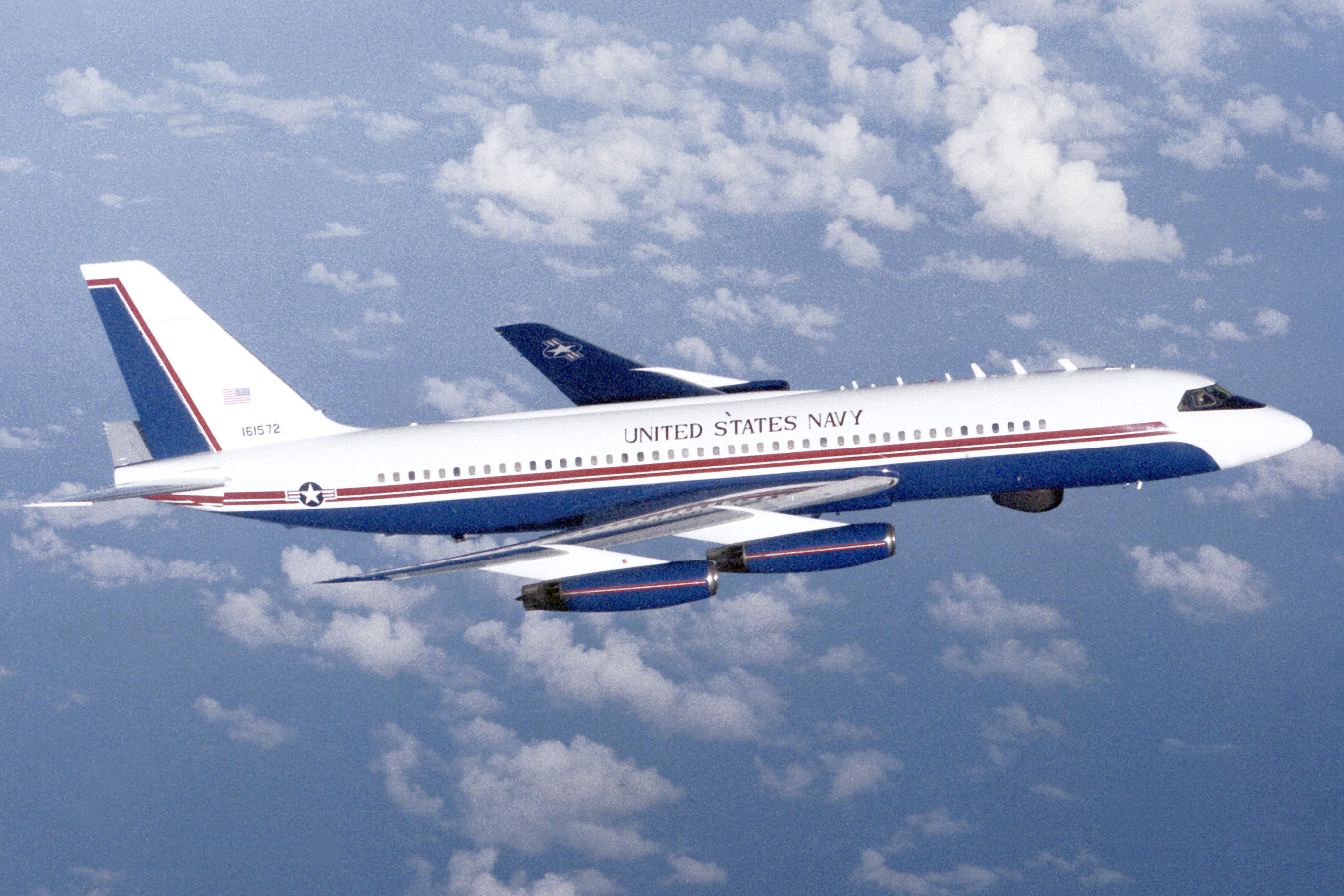
Convair 880

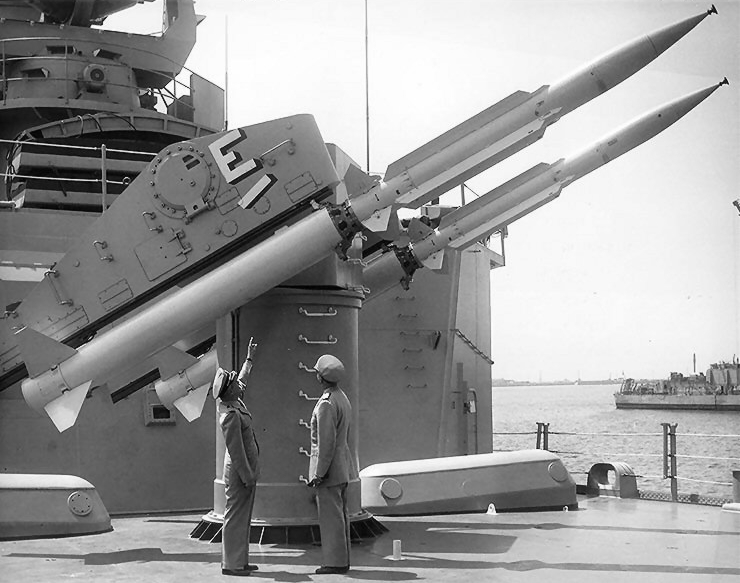
RIM-2 Terrier antiaircraft missile on board USS Providence

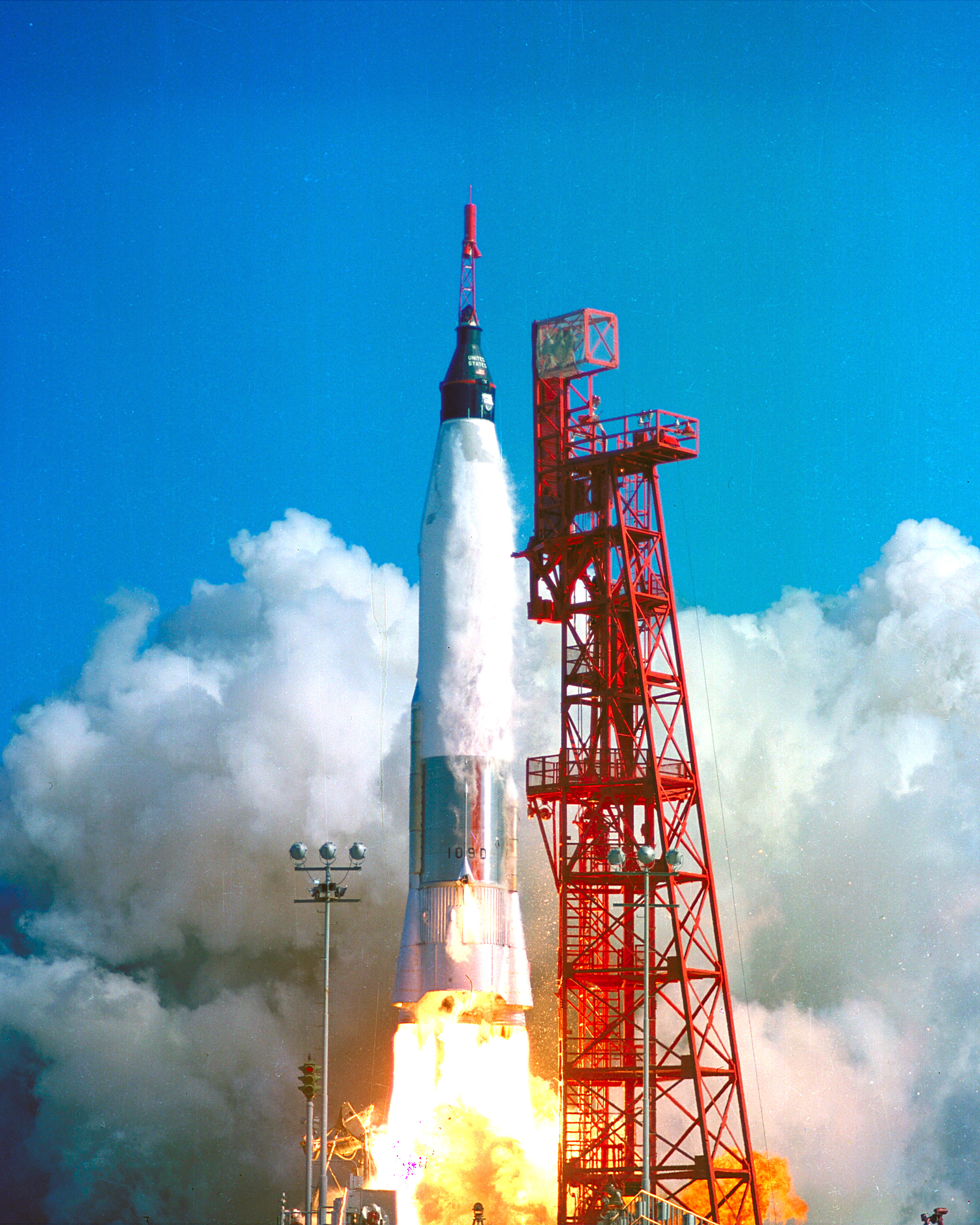
Atlas rocket launching Friendship 7, the first U.S. crewed orbital space flight

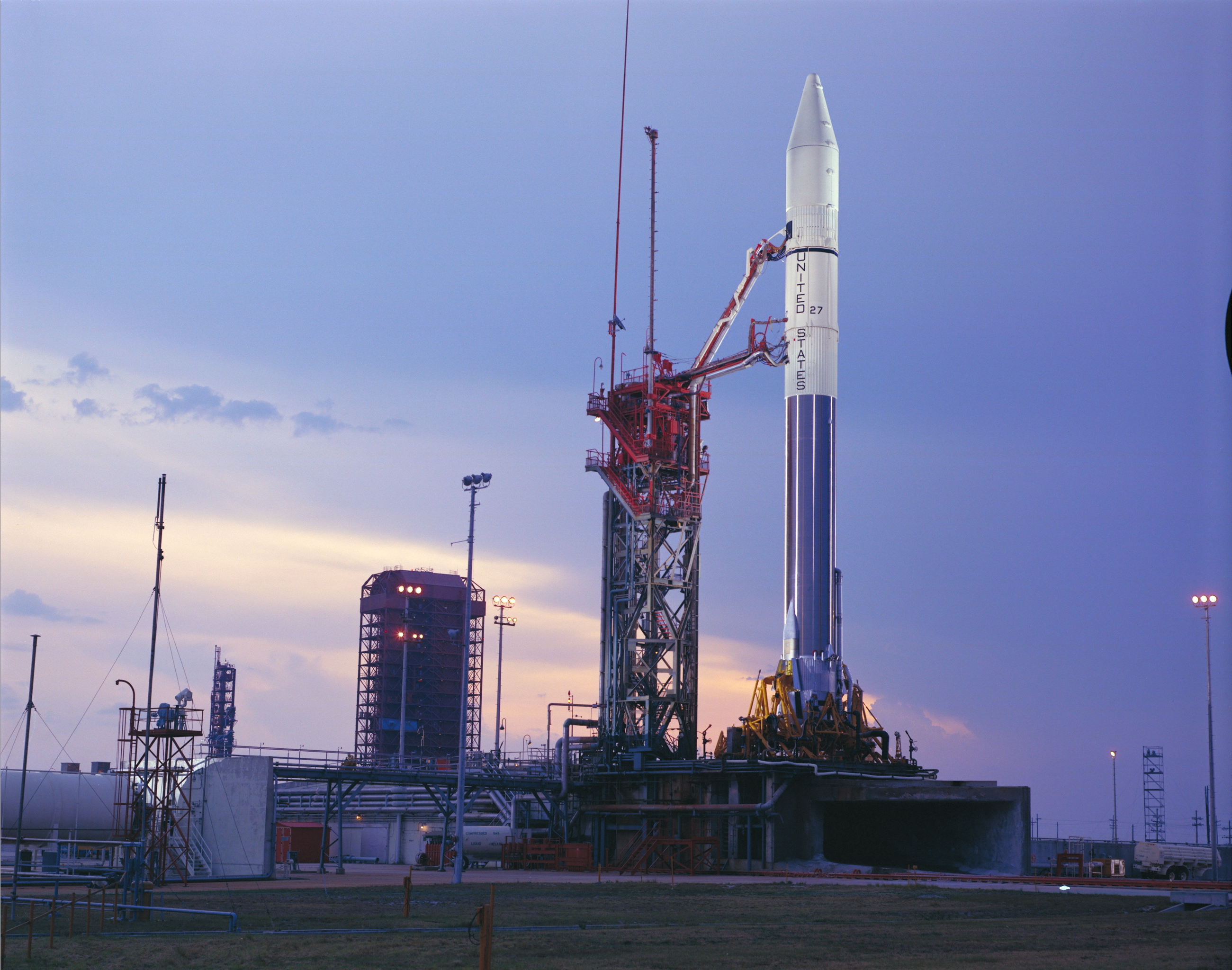
Atlas-Centaur with Pioneer 10 on launch pad

Convair, originally Consolidated Vultee Aircraft Corporation, was an American aircraft-manufacturing company created by the 1943 merger of Consolidated Aircraft and Vultee Aircraft, which later expanded into rockets and spacecraft. It was purchased by General Dynamics in 1953 and operated as their Convair Division for most of its corporate history.

Convair is best known for its military aircraft, such as the Convair B-36 Peacemaker and Convair B-58 Hustler strategic bombers, and the Convair F-102 Delta Dagger and Convair F-106 Delta Dart Century Series interceptors. It also manufactured the first Atlas rockets, including those used for the crewed orbital flights of Project Mercury. The company's subsequent Atlas-Centaur design continued this success, and derivatives of the design remain in use as of 2025.

In addition to producing propeller-driven civilian airliners, such as the ten or so variants of the CV-240, the company entered the jet airliner business with its Convair 880 and Convair 990 designs. These were smaller than contemporary aircraft like the Boeing 707 and Douglas DC-8, but somewhat faster than both. The jets made their first flights on January 27, 1959 and January 24, 1961, respectively. When only 65 and 37 examples of the Convair 880 and Convair 990 were produced respectively, the company exited the airliner design business.

While the pair’s combination of features failed to find a profitable niche, the manufacturing capability built up for these projects allowed the company to become a major subcontractor for airliner fuselages.

In 1994, most of the company's divisions were sold by General Dynamics to McDonnell Douglas and Lockheed, with the remaining components deactivated in 1996.

== History ==
=== Origins ===
Consolidated Aircraft Company produced important aircraft in the early years of World War II, especially the B-24 Liberator heavy bomber and the PBY Catalina seaplane for the U.S. armed forces and their allies. Approximately 18,500 B-24s were produced by Consolidated Aircraft and a number of major contractors across a number of versions; it holds records as the world's most-produced bomber, heavy bomber, multi-engine aircraft, and American military aircraft in history. The Catalina remained in production through May 1945, and more than 4,000 were built.

What was soon called "Convair" (first unofficially, and then officially), was created in 1943 by the merger of Consolidated Aircraft Company and the Vultee Aircraft Company. This merger produced a large aircraft manufacturer, ranked fourth among United States corporations by value of wartime production contracts, higher than the giants Douglas Aircraft, Boeing, and Lockheed. Convair always had most of its research, design, and manufacturing operations in San Diego County in Southern California, though surrounding counties participated as well, mostly as contractors to Convair.

=== Jet Age, Cold War, and Space Age ===
In March 1953, all of the Convair company was bought by the General Dynamics Corporation, a conglomerate of military and high-technology companies, and it became officially the Convair Division within General Dynamics.

After the beginning of the Jet Age of military fighters and bombers, Convair was a pioneer of the delta-winged aircraft design, along with the French Dassault aircraft company, which designed and built the Mirage fighter planes.

One of Convair's most famous products was the ten-engined Convair B-36 strategic bomber, burning four turbojets and turning six pusher propellers driven by Pratt & Whitney R-4360 Wasp Major radial piston engines. The Convair B-36 was the largest land-based piston engine bomber in the world. The Atlas missile, the F-102 Delta Dagger and F-106 Delta Dart delta-winged interceptors, and the delta-winged B-58 Hustler supersonic intercontinental nuclear bomber were all Convair products. In the 1960s, Convair manufactured jet commercial airliners, the Convair 880 and Convair 990 Coronado, but these were not profitable. However, Convair found that it was profitable to be an aviation subcontractor and manufacture large subsections of airliners, such as fuselages, for larger airliner companies, McDonnell Douglas, Boeing and Lockheed.

In the 1950s, Convair shifted money and effort to its missile and rocket projects, producing the Terrier missile ship-launched surface-to-air system for the U.S. Navy during the 1960s and 1970s. Convair's Atlas rocket, originally proposed in 1945 with a unique pressurized cylinder airframe, was revived in the 1950s as an ICBM for the U.S. Air Force using V-2 technology motors in response to the Soviet missile threat. It was first launched in 1957 but its use as an ICBM was soon replaced in 1962 by the room-temperature liquid-fueled Titan II missile, and later by the solid-fueled Minuteman missile. The Atlas rocket transitioned into a civilian launch vehicle and was used for the first orbital crewed U.S. space flights during Project Mercury in 1962 and 1963.

The Atlas rocket became a very reliable booster for launching of satellites and continued to evolve, remaining in use into the 21st century, when combined with the Centaur upper stage to form the Atlas-Centaur launch vehicle for launching geosynchronous communication satellites and space probes. The Centaur rocket was also designed, developed, and produced by Convair, and it was the first widely used outer space rocket to use the all-cryogenic fuel-oxidizer combination of liquid hydrogen and liquid oxygen. The use of this liquid hydrogen – liquid oxygen combination in the Centaur was an important direct precursor to the use of the same fuel-oxidizer combination in the Saturn S-II second stage and the Saturn S-IVB third stage of the gigantic Saturn V Moon rocket of the Apollo program. The S-IVB had earlier also been used as the second stage of the smaller Saturn IB rocket, such as the one used to launch Apollo 7. The Centaur upper stage was first designed and developed for launching the Surveyor lunar landers, beginning in 1966, to augment the delta-V of the Atlas rockets and give them enough payload capability to deliver the required mass of the Surveyors to the Moon.

More than 100 Convair-produced Atlas-Centaur rockets (including those with their successor designations) were used to successfully launch over 100 satellites, and among their many other outer-space missions, they launched the Pioneer 10 and Pioneer 11 space probes, the first two to be launched on trajectories that carried them out of the Solar System.

In addition to aircraft, missiles, and space vehicles, Convair developed the large Charactron vacuum tubes, a form of cathode-ray tube (CRT) computer display with a shaped mask to form characters, and to give an example of a minor product, the CORDIC algorithms, which is widely used today to calculate trigonometric functions in calculators, field-programmable gate arrays, and other small electronic systems.

=== Dissolution ===
General Dynamics announced the sale of the Missile Systems Division segment of Convair to Hughes Aircraft Company in May 1992 and the Space Systems Division segment to Martin Marietta in 1994. In July 1994, General Dynamics and McDonnell Douglas mutually agreed to terminate Convair's contract to provide fuselages for the 300-seat MD-11 airliner. Manufacturing responsibility was to be transferred to McDonnell Douglas, which said it would not preserve the operation in San Diego. General Dynamics had tried for two years to sell the Aircraft structures segment of Convair, but the effort ultimately failed.

The termination of the contract meant the end of the Convair Division and of General Dynamics's presence in San Diego, as well as the city's long aircraft-building tradition. The defense contractor once employed 18,000 people there, but after selling its divisions, that number is now zero. General Dynamics closed its complex in Kearny Mesa, demolishing the facility between 1994 and 1996. Homes and offices now occupy the site. The Lindbergh Field plant that produced B-24s during World War II was also demolished and the consolidated rental car facility now occupies this space.

The Fort Worth, Texas factory, constructed to build the B-24s, and its associated engineering locations and laboratories — all previously used to make hundreds of Consolidated B-24s, General Dynamics F-111 Aardvark fighter-bombers and General Dynamics F-16 Fighting Falcons, along with dozens of smaller projects — were sold, along with all intellectual property and the legal rights to the products designed and built within, to the Lockheed Corporation. In 1996, General Dynamics deactivated all of the remaining legal entities of the Convair Division.

== Timeline ==
- 1923 Consolidated Aircraft Corporation formed by Major Reuben H. Fleet
- 1934 AVCO acquired the Airplane Development Corporation from Cord and formed the Aviation Manufacturing Corporation (AMC)
- 1936 AMC liquidated to form the Vultee Aircraft Division, an autonomous subsidiary of AVCO
- 1939 Vultee Aircraft Division of AVCO reorganized as an independent company known as Vultee Aircraft, Inc.
- 1941 Consolidated Aircraft Corporation sold to AVCO
- 1943 Consolidated-Vultee, formed by the merger of Consolidated Aircraft and Vultee Aircraft; still controlled by AVCO
- 1947 Convair acquired by the Atlas Corporation
- 1953-1954 Convair acquired by General Dynamics
- 1985 General Dynamics formed their "Space Systems Division" from the Convair Space Program
- 1992 Missile Systems Division sold to Hughes Aircraft Company
- 1993 The Fort Worth facility sold to Lockheed Corporation (now Lockheed Martin)
- 1994 Space Systems Division sold to Martin Marietta (now Lockheed Martin)
- 1994 Convair Aircraft Structures unit sold to McDonnell Douglas (now Boeing)

== Products ==
=== Aircraft ===
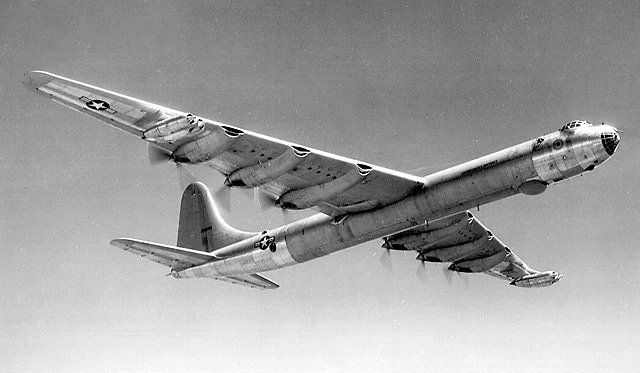
Convair B-36 Peacemaker, which used both piston and jet engines in later versions

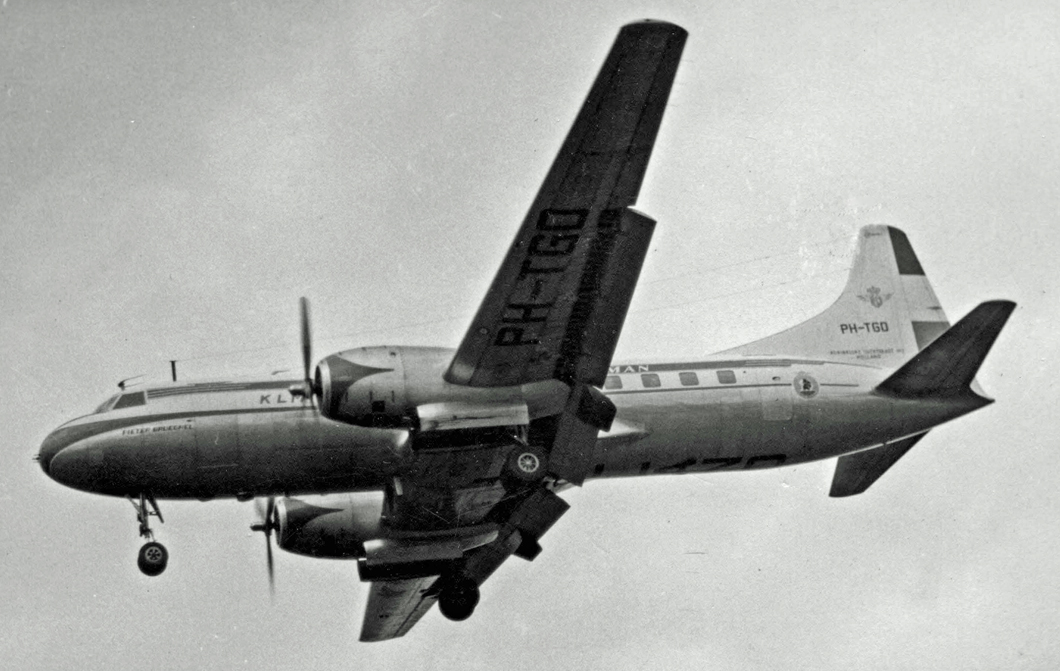
Convair CV-340

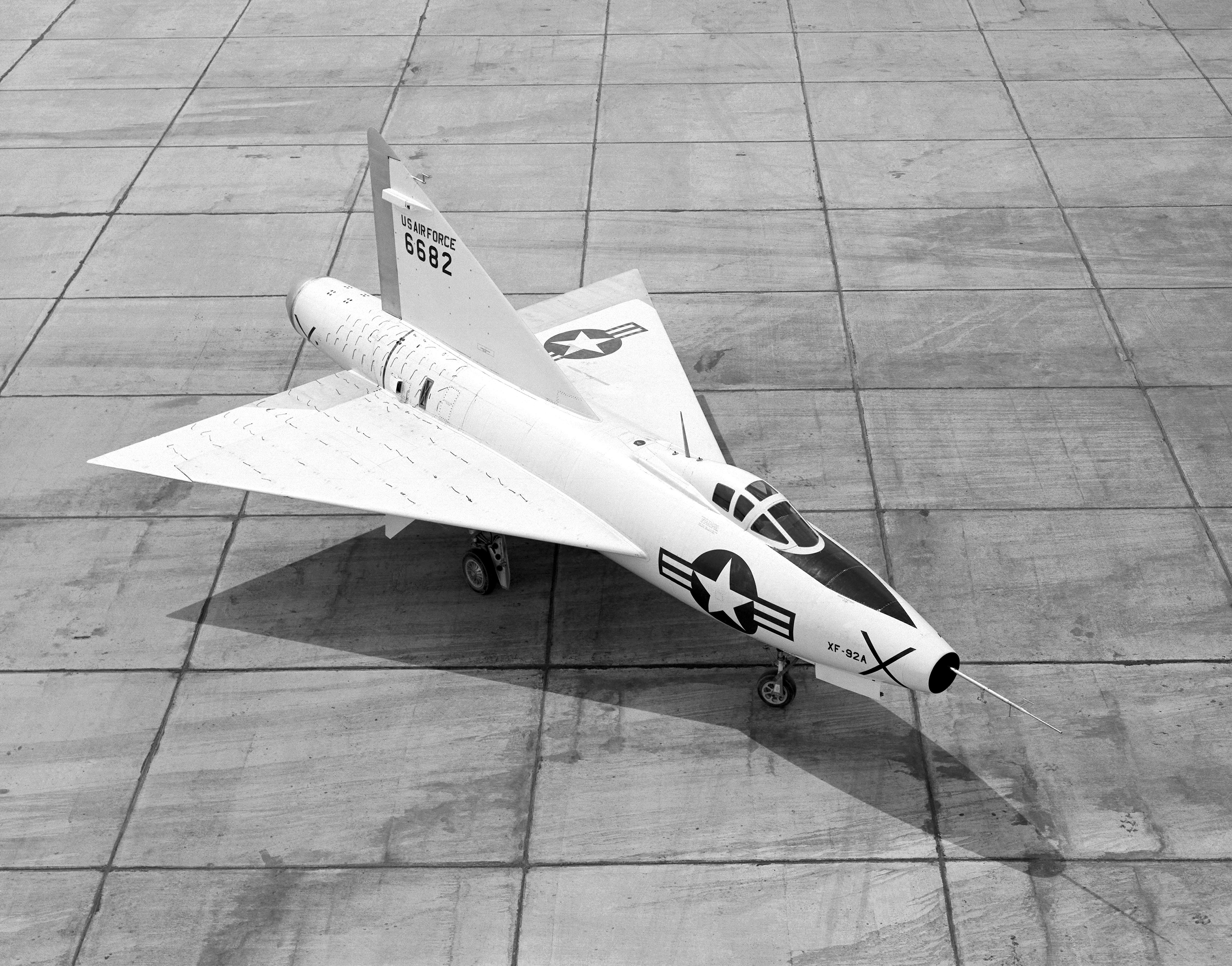
The Convair XF-92A was the first U.S. delta wing aircraft

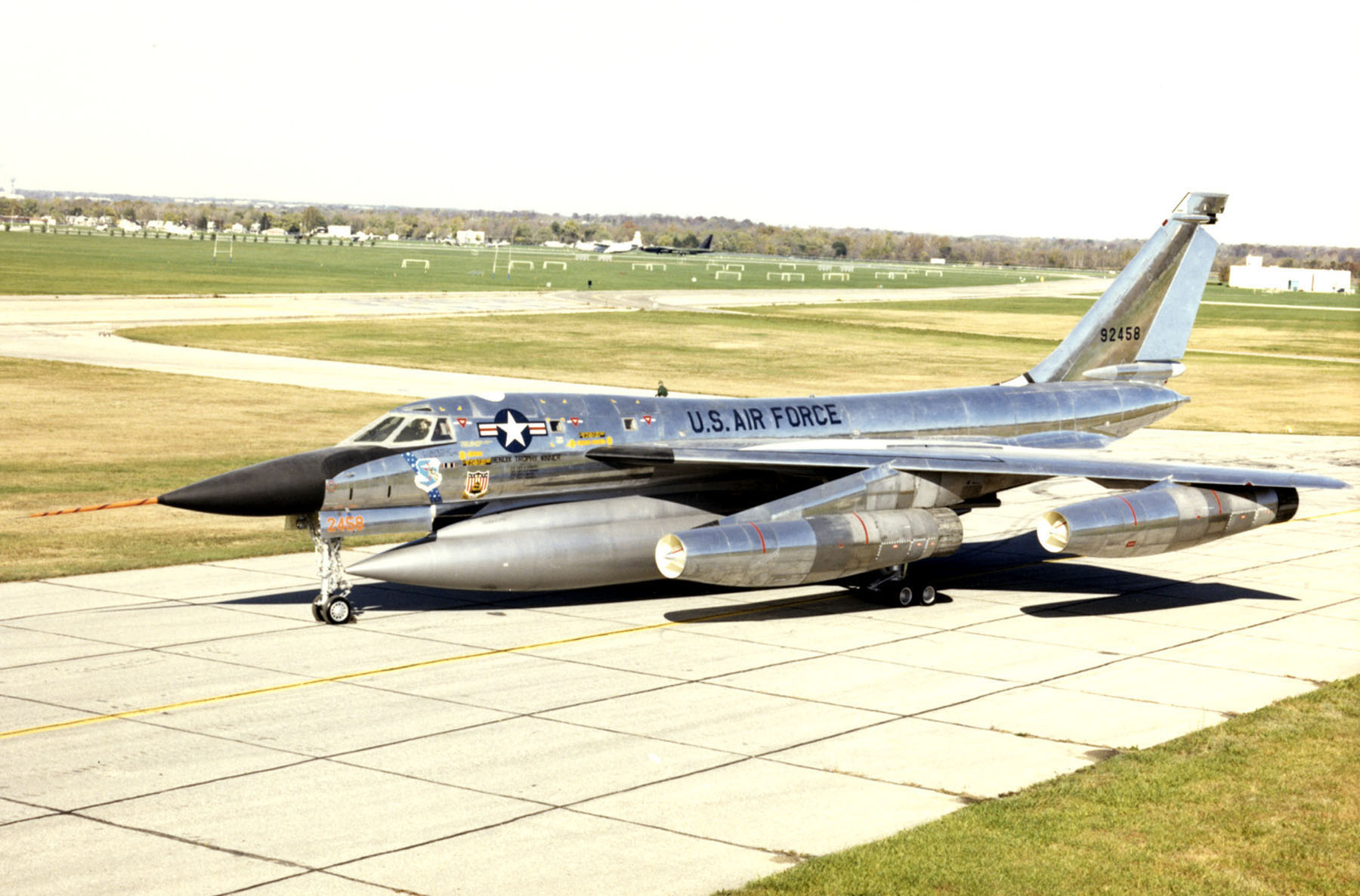
Convair B-58 Hustler

Model name	First flight	Number built	Type
Vultee XA-41	1944	1	Prototype single-engine (28-cyl. radial) ground attack aircraft
Consolidated Vultee XP-81	1945	2	Prototype combined turboprop/turbojet engine escort fighter
Convair 106 Skycoach	1946	1	Prototype single-engine (6-cyl. opposed-piston) general aviation aircraft
Stinson 108	1944	5,135	Single-engine (4-cyl. opposed-piston) general aviation aircraft
Convair Model 110	1946	1	Prototype twin-engine (18-cyl. radial) airliner
Convair Model 111	1940s	1	Prototype single-engine utility airplane
Convair Model 116	1946	1	Roadable aircraft
Convair B-36	1946	384	Combined piston/jet engine strategic bomber
Convair CV-240	1947		Twin-engine (18-cyl. radial) airliner
Convair XB-46	1947	1	Prototype four jet-engine medium bomber
Convair Model 118	1947	2	Roadable aircraft
Convair XC-99	1947	1	Prototype transport aircraft
Convair XF-92	1948	1	Experimental single jet engine interceptor aircraft
Convair C-131 Samaritan	1949	512	Twin-engine (18-cyl. radial) cargo aircraft
Convair CV-340	1951		Twin-engine (radial) airliner
Convair YB-60	1952	1	Prototype eight-engine jet strategic bomber
Convair F2Y Sea Dart	1953	5	Twin jet-engine fighter seaplane
Convair F-102 Delta Dagger	1953	1,000	Single jet-engine interceptor
Convair R3Y Tradewind	1954	13	Four turboprop-engine transport flying boat
Convair NC-131H TIFS	1970	1	In-Flight Simulation testbed aircraft
Convair NB-36H	1955	1	Experimental nuclear powered bomber
Convair XFY Pogo	1954	1	Experimental vertical takeoff and landing fighter
Convair CV-440 Metropolitan	1955		Twin-engine (radial) airliner
Convair B-58 Hustler	1956	116	Four jet-engine strategic bomber
Convair F-106 Delta Dart	1956	342	Single jet-engine interceptor
Convair 880	1959	65	Four jet-engine airliner
Convair 990 Coronado	1961	37	Four jet-engine airliner
Convair Model 48 Charger	1964	1	Prototype twin turboprop-engine light attack aircraft
Convair CV-600	1965		Twin turboprop-engine airliner
Convair CV-640	1965		Twin turboprop-engine airliner
Convair XB-53	N/A	0	Unbuilt triple jet-engine forward-swept wing medium bomber
Convair X-6	N/A	0	Unbuilt experimental nuclear powered aircraft
Convair XP6Y	N/A	0	Unbuilt combined piston/jet engine anti-submarine flying boat
Convair Kingfish	N/A	0	Unbuilt twin jet-engine reconnaissance aircraft
Convair Model 23	N/A	0	Unbuilt twin jet-engine seaplane bomber
Convair Model 44	N/A	0	Unbuilt variable-sweep wing fighter
Convair Model 49	N/A	0	Unbuilt three turboprop-engine coleopter
Convair Model 58-9	N/A	0	Unbuilt supersonic transport aircraft
Convair 660	N/A	0	Unbuilt twin jet-engine airliner
Convair Model 200	N/A	0	Unbuilt single jet-engine VTOL fighter aircraft

=== Missiles and rockets ===
- RTV-A-2 Hiroc (1946) – high-altitude rocket, the project was named MX-774. Cancelled 1947.
- SAM-N-2 Lark (late 1940s) – surface-to-air naval missile
- XSM-74 (1950s) – decoy cruise missile
- RIM-2 Terrier (1951) – surface-to-air naval missile
- RIM-24 Tartar (1962) – surface-to-air naval missile
- XGAM-71 Buck Duck (1955) – decoy missile
- Sky Scorcher (1956) – proposed air-to-air missile
- Pye Wacket (1957) – air-to-air defensive missile project, cancelled during development
- FIM-43 Redeye (1960) – man-portable surface-to-air missile
- Atlas (rocket family) (1959) The Atlas civilian space booster
  - Atlas E/F
  - Atlas G
  - Atlas H
  - Atlas LV-3B
  - Atlas SLV-3
  - Atlas-Able
  - Atlas-Agena
  - SM-65 Atlas – The Atlas ICBM Air Force missile (1957)
  - Convair X-11 and SM-65A Atlas (1957) – Atlas A prototype
  - Convair X-12 and SM-65B Atlas (1958 – Atlas B prototype
  - SM-65C Atlas
  - SM-65D Atlas
  - SM-65E Atlas
  - SM-65F Atlas
  - Atlas-Centaur (1962) and its successor-designations, all of which combined an Atlas booster with a Centaur upper stage – a civilian rocket to launch spacecraft to outer space.
- Centaur (1962)
- BGM-109 Tomahawk long-range, all-weather, subsonic cruise missile.
- AGM-129 Advanced Cruise Missile (1983) – stealthy, nuclear, air-launched cruise missile
