= Neil Laughton =

British Army officer and adventurer (born 1963)

- Laughton in the Watkins Mountain Range, East Greenland. First ascent, May 2005
- Born: 31 October 1963 (age 62)
- Education: University of Westminster
- Occupations: Adventurer; Entrepreneur; Motivational speaker; Business coach
- Spouse: Caroline Reay-Jones (m. 2006)
- Children: Oscar; Scarlett; Amber

Neil Adrian Denis Laughton (born 31 October 1963) is a former army officer, entrepreneur and adventurer. He has completed the Explorers Grand Slam of climbing the highest mountains on all seven continents and reaching both the North and South Poles. He holds a number of world firsts and Guinness World Records records for his expeditions on land, sea and air.

== Personal life ==
Neil A D Laughton was born in Woolwich, London on 31 October 1963, the eldest son of Captain RFG Laughton (Royal Navy) and Gillian E Cocks. Laughton grew up in rural Somerset and went to boarding school in Sussex (Worth Abbey). Upon leaving school in 1982 Neil joined the Royal Marines.

Laughton married Caroline Reay-Jones in 2006. They live in Sussex with their three children; Oscar, Scarlett and Amber.

== Military service ==
He was commissioned into the Royal Marines at the age of 19 on 28 April 1983 and won the coveted Green Beret but resigned his commission in July 1984 after his father died from cancer. After a spell in the corporate world, Laughton volunteered for Selection into the 21st Special Air Service Regiment (Artists) (Reserve) in 1991 and was awarded his sandy coloured beret with famous winged dagger logo bearing the motto "Who Dares Wins". He was awarded his parachute wings in 1992, completed the Explosives and Demolitions course at Hereford and was commissioned at the Royal Military Academy Sandhurst on 6 August 1995. He served in A Sqn, 21 SAS as a Troop Commander until 2003 before resigning his commission at the rank of Captain.

== Qualifications and awards ==
Laughton attended the University of Westminster as a Post-Graduate student, graduating in 1993 with a Diploma in Management Studies. In 1995 The Royal Geographical Society selected him for the Ness Award in 2005 for "Leadership of expeditions and encouragement of others". After joining the Institute of Directors in 2007, he was awarded the institute's Certificate of Company Direction in 2011.

== Career ==
=== Early business career ===
Following his military career Laughton held several management roles within the construction industry before moving into self employment from which his entrepreneurial activities stemmed.

=== Entrepreneurial activities ===
In 1994 Laughton founded Office Projects Group Limited as chairman with Andrew Russell as commercial director. OPL managed and delivered commercial interior and exterior fit-out and refurbishment projects for a range of blue-chip UK customers and was acquired by Balfour Beatty in 2011. Since then he has held non executive director roles as well as founding the Penny Farthing Club in 2013, co-founding Brighton City Airways (City Airways) and is co-founder and director of Floating Developments Ltd as well as founder and managing director of Laughton & Co Ltd.

=== Charity ===
Through his expeditions Laughton has raised funds to support charitable causes, these have included Great Ormond Street Hospital, the Royal National Lifeboat Institution, Community Action Nepal and Global Angels. He has founded and directed a number of events for charities including the annual Great Sussex Bath Race, the Rockinghorse Sportathlon and Speedee Boarding. These events are all held in support of Sussex Based charities Chestnut Tree House, LifeCentre and Rockinghorse.

Laughton is currently an Honorary Vice President of the Scientific Exploration Society a charity founded by John Blashford-Snell in 1969 (Charity no. 267410), having previously held the role of chairman for 6 years from 2017.

=== Books ===
In October 2023 Laughton published Adventureholic: Extraordinary Journeys on Seven Continents by Land, Sea and Air telling the stories of Neil's most unforgettable and daring expeditions.

== Penny Farthings ==
In 2013 Laughton Founded the Penny Farthing Club and is captain of the England Penny Farthing Polo Team. He currently holds the position of club secretary for the Penny Farthing Club. In 2018 Laughton was part of the team that helped Mark Beaumont set a new British one hour track record on a Penny Farthing bicycle of 35.28 km/h (21.92 mph) in one hour, beating the previous record that had stood for 127 years. The team had hoped to beat the world record that had been set in 1886 in Massachusetts, USA but were 270 m (290 yd) short of this world record distance of 35.550 km (22 miles and 150 yards).

Laughton completed a Penny Farthing ride from Land's End to John o' Groats in the summer of 2019 with David Fox-Pitt in support of Mary's Meals and raised over £25,000 for the charity.

=== Guinness World Records ===
Laughton has played a role in setting numerous Guinness World Records for feats on penny farthings and holds 6 records himself.

On 17 September 2019 Laughton managed a team of racing penny farthing riders who attempted individual world records for the furthest distance in an hour around an indoor velodrome. A new Guinness World Record was achieved by Chris Opie with a distance of 34.547 km.

On 10 October 2019 Chris Opie set a new world record for the furthest distance in one hour outdoors at Herne Hill Velodrome - 22 miles 369 yards (35.743 km). Laughton managed the team with support riders Mark Beaumont and James Lowsley-Williams.

In celebration of GWR Day on 14 November 2019 Laughton attempted three Guinness World Record titles on a penny farthing (no hands) at Preston Park velodrome in Brighton. He was successful in all three setting records for; fastest speed on a penny farthing bicycle (no hands) of 29.603 km/h (18.394 mph), fastest 10 km on a penny farthing bicycle (no hands) of 23 minutes and 23.74 seconds and farthest distance on a penny farthing bicycle in one hour (no hands) of 26 km (16 mi).

In October 2024 Laughton organised the Penny Farthing Guinness World Records Extravaganza in London. A total of 12 new penny farthing Guinness World Records were achieved during the course of this 3 day event. Eleven track records were achieved at Herne Hill Velodrome from where a large number of riders took to the streets to ride across London via Tower Bridge to arrive at the Lee Valley Velopark. Here 140 riders, including journalist Jeremy Vine, came together to achieve the longest penny farthing stack. This involved the group forming a self supported line and holding it in place for the required period of 3 minutes. The records achieved during this extravaganza event were:

Record	By	Measured
Furthest distance in one hour by a solo female	Melissa Eisdell	26.199 km (16.279 mi)
Fastest speed (average 100m both directions) by a female	Evi Dumon	38.09 km/h (23.67 mph)
Fastest speed (100m) by a male	Roger Davies	39.70 km/h (24.67 mph)
Fastest speed (100) by a male	Guy Banham	41.56 km/h (25.82 mph)
Fastest 1 KM by a female	Julie Woodward	2 mins 22.320s
Fastest 1 KM by a male	Chris Opie	1 min 20.103s
Fastest 1 KM with ‘No Hands’ by a female	Evi Dumon	2 mins 11.998s
Fastest 1 KM with ‘No Hands’ by a male	Neil Laughton	2 mins 7.294s
Furthest distance in one hour with ‘One Leg’	Alberto Bona	20.294 km (12.610 mi)
Largest number of PR riders in a race at a velodrome	58 riders (including Laughton)	n/a
Furthest distance in one hour by a female team	M Eisdell with J Woodward & E Dumon	24.785 km (15.400 mi)
Largest number of PF bicycles in a ‘Stack’ held for 3 minutes	140 riders (including Laughton)	n/a

== Expeditions ==
Laughton's first expedition was a three-day canoe journey in Somerset with a school friend aged thirteen. He has continued to organise and lead adventurous journeys on seven continents, by land, sea and air. He has completed the Explorers Grand Slam and led more than 50 expeditions to remote parts of the world. He holds two Guinness World Records for high altitude expeditions.

=== Seven Summits ===
Over the course of nine years, Laughton successfully climbed the highest mountains on each of the seven continents, known as the seven summits. The first summit he reached was Acongacua in 1991 and he completed the challenge in 2000 in Antarctica on Mount Vinson. During this undertaking he raised money for Great Ormond Street Hospital.

1. Aconcagua - January 1991
2. Kilimanjaro - July 1992
3. Denali - May 1993
4. Elbrus - February 1994
5. Carstenz (Puncak Jaya) - April 1995
6. Everest - May 1998
7. Vinson - January 2000

=== Mount Everest, Nepal ===
Laughton has taken part in six expeditions on Mt Everest.

==== 1996 ====
During his first Mt Everest expedition in the spring of 1996 Laughton did not reach the summit. He was amongst the climbers caught in the "worst storm in 100 years" whilst at an altitude of 8,000 m (26,000 ft) 9–11 May 1996.

==== 1998 ====
In 1998, Laughton returned to Mt Everest leading an expedition team that includes the young Bear Grylls. They successfully reached the 8,848 m (29,029 ft) summit of Mt Everest on 26 May 1998, at which point Bear became the youngest Briton to achieve this.

==== 2003 ====
In 2003, Laughton led an expedition to help wheelchair-using explorer Glenn Shaw achieve his life's ambition of seeing Mount Everest from Base Camp. Shaw had a medical condition known as 'Brittle Bones' and used a wheelchair all of his life. The team successfully reached Base Camp on the north side of the mountain.

==== 2007 ====
In 2007 Laughton returned to Everest with Bear Grylls as Team Leader of "Mission Everest". This record-setting parajet paramotor flight eventually reached an altitude of 8,991.6 m (29,500 ft) flying higher than all the Himalayan peaks and the mission raised $1 million for the charity Global Angels.

==== 2015 ====
During an expedition to set the record for the World's Highest Dinner Party, Laughton and his team are on the north side of Everest in Tibet at an altitude of 6,400 m (21,000 ft) during the devastating earthquake of 2015. The record attempt is abandoned as the team successfully descend from high altitude to help with the rescue efforts.

==== 2018 ====
Laughton returns again with a team to the north side of Everest and successfully host the World's Highest black tie dinner party on Mt Everest at an altitude of 7,056 m (23,150 ft) on 30 April 2018 as recognised by Guinness World Records. The three-course dinner was specially created by chef Sat Bains who was a member of the original expedition team in 2015. This expedition raised over £100,000 for charity.

=== Circumnavigations ===
Laughton holds a number of records for completing first circumnavigations by jet ski and paddle board. In 2000 Laughton was with the first team to circumnavigate the British Isles on a jet-ski. This 30 day project raised funds for the RNLI. This was followed in 2017 by the first jet ski circumnavigation of Ireland again in aid of the RNLI and Help for Heroes. November 2017, Laughton led a team of paddle-boarders in the first circumnavigation by stand up paddle board of Easter Island in the Pacific.

=== Greenland ===
In 2005 Laughton led an expedition in Greenland and achieves twelve first ascents of previously unclimbed peaks as well as making an ascent of Gunnbjørn Fjeld the highest mountain north of the Arctic Circle.

=== Sky Car ===
In 2009 Laughton undertook a mission to pilot the world's first road legal flying car on a 5,800 km (3,600 mi) journey by land and air from London to Timbuktu across the Sahara for charity Alive & Kicking. Leaving Knightsbridge on 9 January the team completed the expedition on 25 February 2009. The Parajet Skycar was driven where there were roads available and flown where they were not, notably over the Straits of Gibraltar and making a north - south crossing of the sahara desert.

=== Polar Expeditions ===
Laughton has undertaken a number of polar expeditions. Three are of particular note and the last degree expeditions to both poles completed his explorers grand slam.

In 1999 Laughton skis the Last Degree to the North Pole, the last 110 km (60 nmi) to the North Pole, raising money for the Starlight Children's Charity.

The Shackleton Memorial Expedition led by Laughton took place in 2001 in Antarctica. The expedition planned to retrace Shackleton's traverse of South Georgia. The expedition took three and a half days to traverse the mountain terrain in atrocious weather conditions raising money for James Caird Trust

To mark the 100th anniversary of Captain Scott's arrival at the South Pole in 1912, Laughton led an expedition to ski the Last Degree to the South Pole. When they reached the Pole Laughton organised the first official game of cricket there with the British team winning by two wickets against the "rest of the world" in this commemorative game

=== Bering Strait ===
In the winter of 2016 Neil Laughton and James Bingham attempted to make a crossing of the Bering Strait. The ice was too thin to walk on and would not support their weight, but nor was it possible to paddle through on kayaks. They began to drift north in the ice into open ocean and had to be rescued airlifted from the ice by a United States Coast Guard helicopter who airlifted them from the ice.

=== Amazon ===
In May 2022 Laughton led an expedition in the Peruvian Amazon to travel 260 km on the Yanayaka River. The team completed their journey from Dorado Lake to Nauta at the confluence of the Ucayali and Maranon rivers on standup paddle boards. The expedition raised money for several charities including Prostate UK. This led to Laughton being tested and subsequently treated for prostate cancer in May 2023, from which he made a full recovery.

=== World's Highest Bike Ride ===
Laughton's first attempt to achieve the Guinness World Record for the highest altitude bike ride on Mt Putha Hiunchuli, the 95th highest mountain in the world in October 2022 had to be abandoned due to adverse weather conditions. Laughton returned in September 2024 and he and Nima Kanchha Sherpa reached the summit on 18 September where they rode their bikes to set a new high altitude record of 7,246 m (23,772 ft). A second Guinness World Record was achieved during this expedition, for the highest altitude playing a board/party game at 6,216 m (20,393 ft) for a chess game between Laughton and Tim Maw.
