= Aircar =

Aircar may refer to:

- Compressed-air car
- Flying car
  - Klein Vision AirCar, a flying car designed by Štefan Klein
- Curtiss-Wright Model 2500 Aircar
- AirCars, a 1997 video game developed by MidNite Entertainment Group Inc.

== See also ==
- Aerocar (disambiguation)
- Flying car (disambiguation)
- Skycar (disambiguation)
