= Kissimmee Air Museum =

- Location within Florida
- Location: Kissimmee Gateway Airport, 233 N. Hoagland Boulevard, Kissimmee, Florida
- Coordinates: 28.2944°N 81.44623°W
- Type: Vintage Aircraft

The Kissimmee Air Museum was located at the Kissimmee Gateway Airport in Kissimmee, Florida. It housed vintage aircraft from World War II to the Vietnam War including an outdoor showroom. It was a working museum that restored vintage aircraft. In 2021, the Kissimmee Air Museum closed when the associated Warbird Adventures, Inc moved their operation to Ninety Six, South Carolina.

When the Flying Tigers Warbird Restoration Museum closed in 2004 due to Hurricane Charley, Warbird Adventures, Inc. saw a need for a museum and opened the Kissimmee Air Museum in 2007.

== Exhibits ==
The museum displayed a number of vintage aircraft owned by the associated Warbird Adventures, Inc. as well as on loan from private individuals and other organizations.

=== Operational aircraft ===
- Boeing Stearman N2S-5
- Cessna L-19
- Fouga Magister
- Grumman S-2 Tracker
- Hiller OH-23 Raven
- North American P-51 Mustang
- North American T-6 Texan
- Robinson R44
- PZL TS-11 Iskra
- Taylor Aerocar

=== Aircraft under restoration ===
- Boeing Stearman PT-17
- Mikoyan-Gurevich MiG-17F
- PZL TS-11 Iskra

=== Aircraft engines ===
- de Havilland Goblin
- General Electric CJ610
- Kinner R-5
- Klimov VK-1
- Rolls-Royce Griffon

== See also ==
- List of aviation museums
