= Convair 106 Skycoach =

Model 106 Skycoach

General information
- Type: 4-seat light aircraft
- National origin: United States
- Manufacturer: Convair
- Number built: 1

History
- First flight: April 1946

The Convair Model 106 Skycoach was an experimental four-seat light aircraft, designed and built by the Stinson Division of Convair at the end of World War II.

== Design and development ==
The Model 106 was a four-seat cabin aircraft with a pusher engine, fixed spatted tricycle undercarriage and twin tail booms flanking the propeller. The three passengers and pilot sat in a cabin in the fuselage nacelle, which also housed the pusher 230 hp (170 kW) Franklin 6A8-225-B8 six-cylinder horizontally-opposed piston engine, driving a cooling fan and pusher propeller.

Flight testing was carried out at San Diego, but performance was found to be unexceptional, comparing very poorly to the contemporary Beechcraft Bonanza, which could cruise at 165 mph (143 kn; 266 km/h) on only 165 hp (123 kW). With a maximum speed of only 142 mph (123 kn; 229 km/h) the Model 106 was hopelessly outclassed and Convair abandoned development, scrapping the sole prototype, (regn. NX40004, msn. 1), in 1947.

== Specifications (Model 106 Skycoach) ==
Data from General Dynamics aircraft and their predecessors

General characteristics

- Crew: 1
- Capacity: 3 passengers
- Powerplant: 1 × Franklin 6A8-225-B8 six-cylinder air-cooled horizontally-opposed piston aircraft engine, 230 hp (170 kW)

Performance

- Maximum speed: 142 mph (229 km/h, 123 kn)

== See also ==
Aircraft of comparable role, configuration, and era

- Anderson-Greenwood AG-14
