= Flying car (disambiguation) =

A flying car is a roadable aircraft, a vehicle which can travel both on roads and in the air.

Flying car may also refer to:

- The Flying Car (1920 film), a German silent film directed by Harry Piel
- The Flying Car (2002 film), a short film written and directed by Kevin Smith
- Flying Cars, a defunct attraction at Riverview Park in Chicago, Illinois, United States

== See also ==
- Hovercar, a car or automobile similar to commercial and military hovercraft vehicles
- Fly-car, a rapid response medical assistance vehicle
- Aerocar (disambiguation)
- Aircar (disambiguation)
- Skycar (disambiguation)
