= Fulton Airphibian =

Type of aircraft

Airphibian
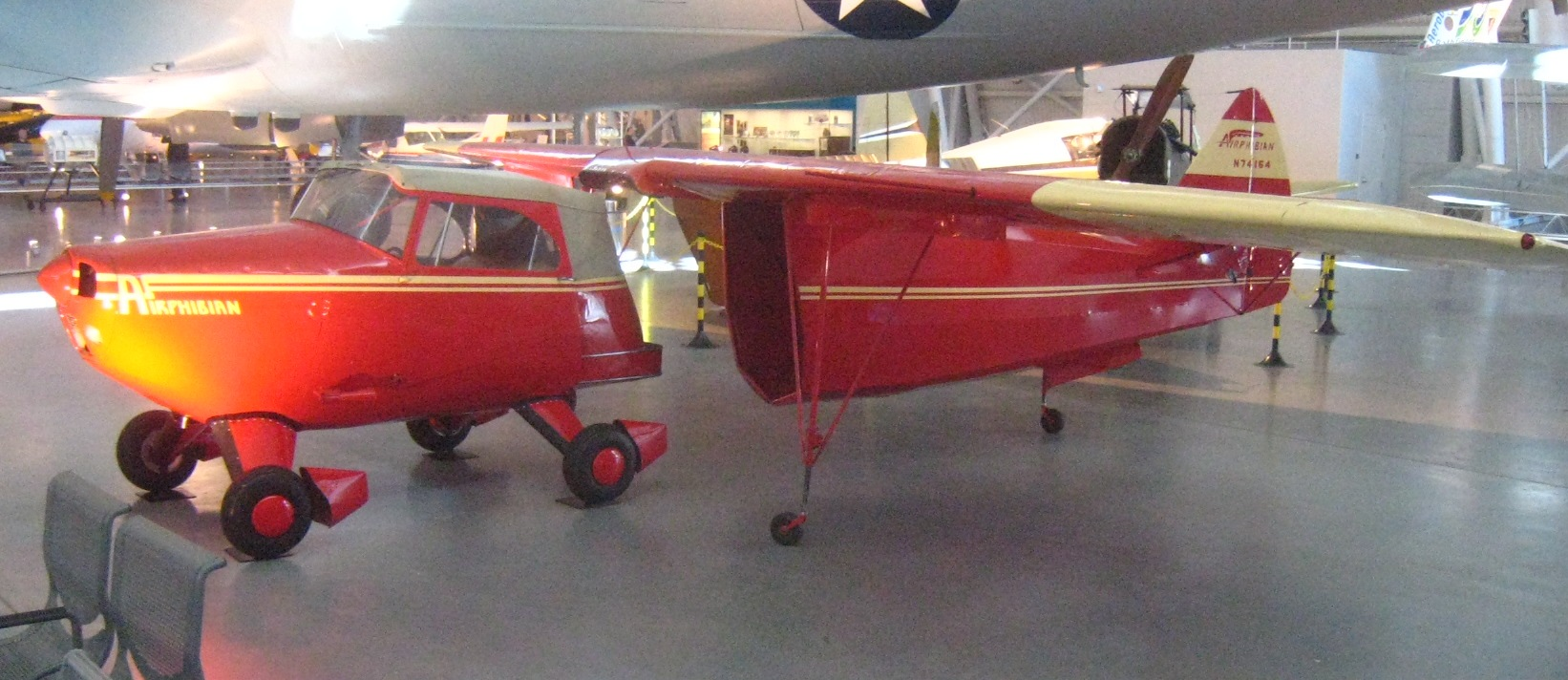

General information
- Type: Roadable aircraft
- Manufacturer: Continental Inc
- Designer: Robert Edison Fulton, Jr.
- Number built: 4

History
- Introduction date: 1946

The Fulton FA-2 Airphibian is an American roadable aircraft manufactured in 1946.

== Development ==
Designed by Robert Edison Fulton Jr., it was an aluminum-bodied car, built with independent suspension, aircraft-sized wheels, and a six-cylinder 165 hp engine. The fabric wings were easily attached to the fuselage, converting the car into a plane. Four prototypes were built.

In December 1950, the Civil Aeronautics Administration (CAA) (later to become the FAA) certified one of the prototypes and gave it an 1A11 Aircraft Specification, N74104. Lou Achitoff, was the CAA test pilot. The N74154 is the aircraft that is today in the main building of the National Air and Space Museum in Washington, DC, having previously been on display in the Steven F. Udvar-Hazy Center.

The craft made its debut in November 1946 at Danbury, Connecticut. Financial concerns forced Fulton to sell to a company that never developed it.

== Design ==
The Airphibian took the approach of converting from an aircraft to a roadable vehicle by a conversion process that left aircraft sections behind during road use. The process consisted of removing a three-bladed propeller and placing it on a hook on the side of the fuselage, cranking down support casters, and disengaging lock levers connecting the flight unit to the road unit. The wing and aft fuselage are detached for road use.

== Surviving aircraft ==
In the mid-1990s, one of the surviving Airphibians was restored by Fulton III, along with David Dumas and Deborah Hanson. Later, it was put on display for several years at the Canada Aviation Museum in Ottawa, Ontario, Canada in their main display hall, but in 2009 it moved to the Steven F. Udvar-Hazy Center (annex of the National Air and Space Museum). Since 2022 it has been on display in the National Air and Space Museum in Washington, DC.

== Specifications ==
Data from Jane's All The World's Aircraft 1951–52, Smithsonian National Air and Space Museum

General characteristics

- Crew: 2
- Length: 22 ft 2 in (6.76 m)
- Wingspan: 34 ft (10 m)
- Height: 7 ft 8 in (2.34 m)
- Empty weight: 1,500 lb (680 kg)
- Gross weight: 2,100 lb (953 kg)

Performance

- Maximum speed: 120 mph (190 km/h, 100 kn)
- Cruise speed: 110 mph (180 km/h, 96 kn)
- Range: 350 mi (560 km, 300 nmi)
- Service ceiling: 12,000 ft (3,700 m)
- Rate of climb: 600 ft/min (3.0 m/s)

== See also ==
- Aerocar
- Aerocar Aero-Plane
- Aerocar Coot
