= Molt Taylor =

American aeronautical engineer (1912–1995)

Moulton Taylor
- Born: 29 September 1912; Portland, Oregon, United States
- Died: 16 November 1995 (aged 83)
- Occupation: Engineer
- Known for: Taylor Aerocar

Moulton B. "Molt" Taylor (September 29, 1912 – November 16, 1995) was an American aeronautical engineer famed for his work designing, developing, and manufacturing on a small scale one of the first practical flying cars, the 1949 Aerocar.

== Life and career ==
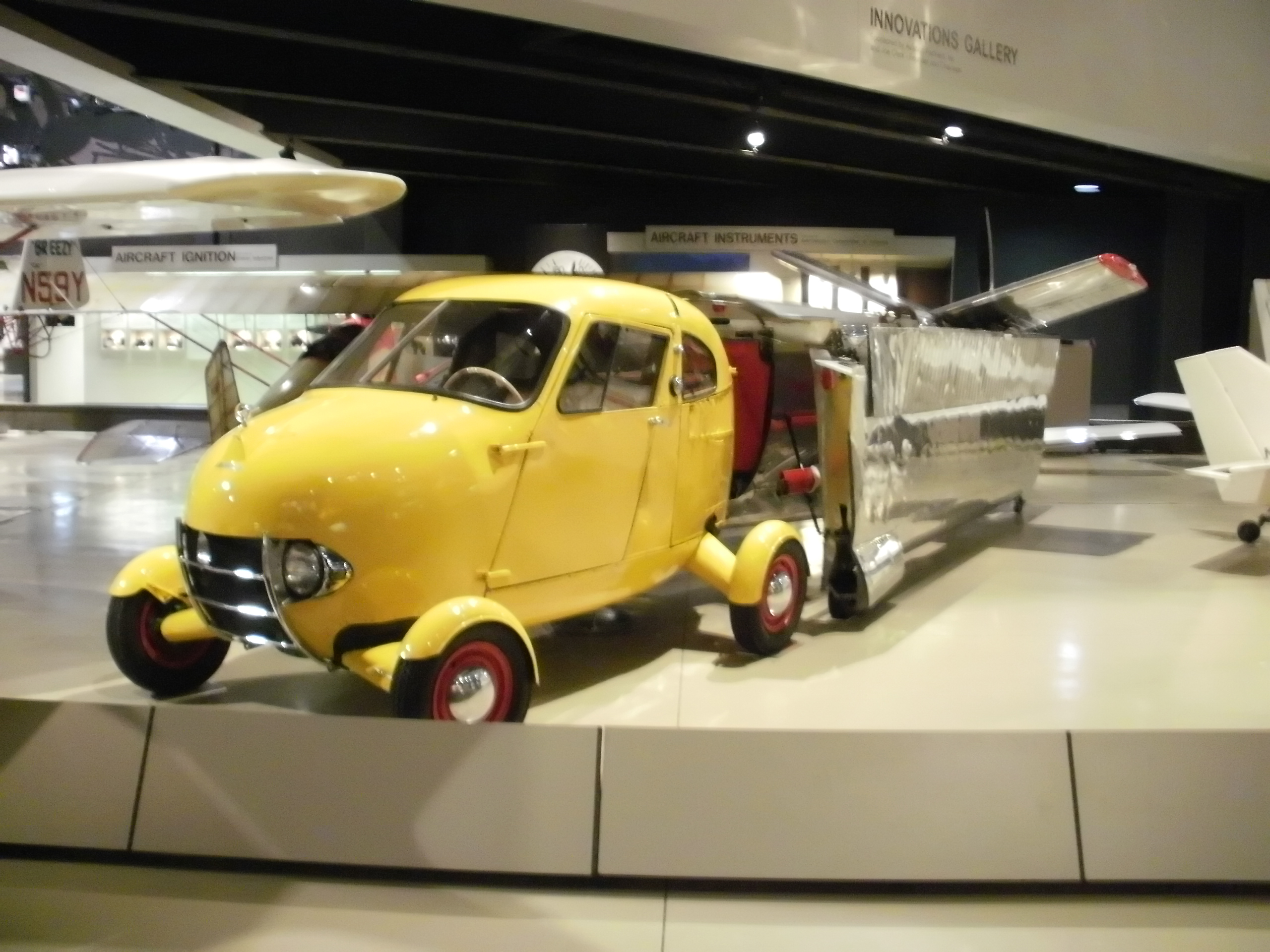
Taylor Aerocar displayed at the EAA Aviation Museum

Taylor was born in Portland, Oregon and studied engineering at the University of Washington. After graduation, he was accepted into the United States Navy as a Naval Aviator during World War II, and spent much of the war working on the Navy's Gorgon missile program, for which he was awarded the Legion of Merit medal. Shortly after the war, he designed his first flying car, the Aerocar, and founded Aerocar International in Longview, Washington, to develop, manufacture and market the aircraft. Taylor came up with the idea for the Aerocar in 1946, after meeting inventor Robert Edison Fulton Jr. and noticing the flaws in his Airphibian roadable aircraft design. To date, Taylor's Aerocar remains the closest that any such design came to actual mass production, but eventually only six models were built.

Although Taylor continued to push for the viability of the flying car throughout the rest of his life, he also designed a number of only slightly more conventional designs for the homebuilt aircraft market, including the Taylor Coot amphibian and the Aerocar IMP family of light sport planes (which consists of the Mini, Micro and Ultra IMP).

In a 1979 article about the future of flight past the year 2000, Taylor somewhat inaccurately predicted widespread use of flying autos and pusher configurations, however he did accurately predict the mainstream use of carbon materials for lightweight spars and wing ribs.

He also gave frequent help and advice to the Klapmeier brothers throughout the 1980s on their first design, the pusher-propeller homebuilt Cirrus VK-30.

== Awards and honors ==
He was awarded the Edward Longstreth Medal from the Franklin Institute in 1960. In 1975, he received the Experimental Aircraft Association (EAA) Dr. August Raspet Memorial Award for "significant advancements in the field of light aircraft design". Six days before his death in 1995, Taylor was inducted into the EAA Hall of Fame.

The Kelso-Longview Regional Airport is also known as the "Molt Taylor Field".
