= Aerocar Mini-IMP =

American homebuilt aircraft

Aerocar Mini Imp
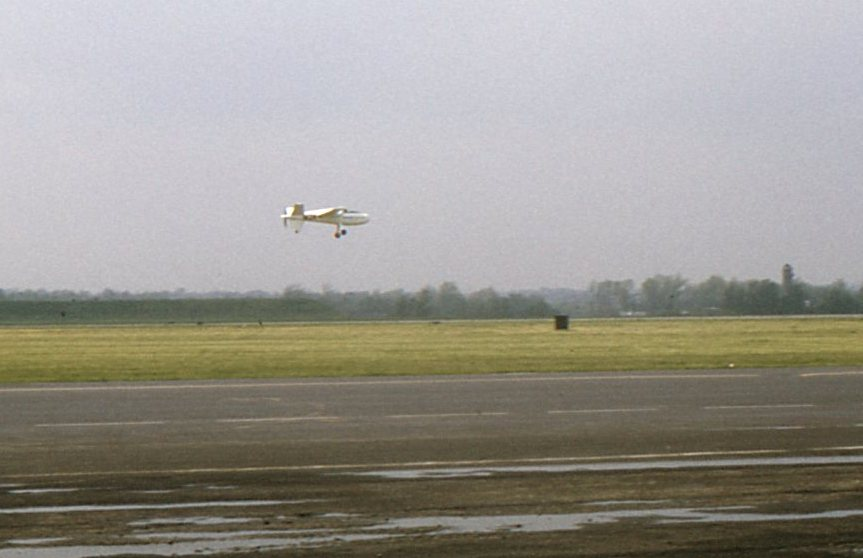
- Mini Imp flyby in 1969

General information
- Type: Homebuilt aircraft
- National origin: United States
- Manufacturer: Aerocar International
- Designer: Moulton Taylor
- Status: Plans available (2015)

History
- Developed from: Aerocar IMP

The Aerocar Mini-IMP (Independently Made Plane) is a light aircraft designed by Moulton Taylor and marketed for homebuilding by Aerocar International. It is a scaled-down derivative of his original Aerocar IMP design. A two-seat version called the Bullet was also built. The Mini-IMP follows the same unconventional layout as its larger predecessor, with a center mounted engine, long driveshaft to a tail propeller, and inverted-V rudder/elevators.

The aircraft is available in the form of plans for amateur construction. Following Taylor's death, the plans and licensing for the Mini-IMP have been marketed by the Mini-IMP Aircraft Company of Weatherford, Texas.

== Design and development ==
The aircraft features a cantilever high-wing, a single-seat enclosed cockpit, fixed or retractable tricycle landing gear or conventional landing gear and a single engine in pusher configuration.

The aircraft is made from riveted aluminum sheet. Its 24.5 ft (7.5 m) span wing is mounted well behind the pilot and employs a NASA GA(PC)-1 airfoil. The engine is mounted behind the pilot's seat driving the propeller through an extension shaft. Engines used include the 60 to 100 hp (45 to 75 kW) Volkswagen air-cooled engine four-stroke.

Taylor claimed the Mini-IMP was not an original design, but an updated version of the 1912 Edson Fessenden Gallaudet Bullet, a design that was capable of 110 mph in the earliest days of flight.

In the late 1970s inquiries were made concerning a military version of the Mini-IMP, skinned with Kevlar, armed with two 7.62-millimeter machine guns, and with room in the baggage compartment for a considerable quantity of ammunition. Nothing came of the proposal.

== Specifications (typical Mini-IMP) ==
Data from Bayerl and Tacke

General characteristics

- Crew: one
- Wingspan: 24 ft 6 in (7.46 m)
- Empty weight: 518 lb (235 kg)
- Gross weight: 805 lb (365 kg)
- Fuel capacity: 12 U.S. gallons (45 L; 10.0 imp gal)
- Powerplant: 1 × Volkswagen air-cooled engine four cylinder, 1835 cc, air-cooled, four stroke automotive conversion, 60 hp (45 kW)
- Propellers: 2-bladed composite

Performance

- Maximum speed: 175 mph (281 km/h, 152 kn)
- Cruise speed: 150 mph (240 km/h, 130 kn)
- Stall speed: 43 mph (69 km/h, 37 kn)
- Rate of climb: 1,200 ft/min (6 m/s)

== See also ==
Related development:

- Holcomb Perigee
- IMP
- Micro-IMP
