= Convair Model 118 =

American flying car

Model 118 ConVairCar
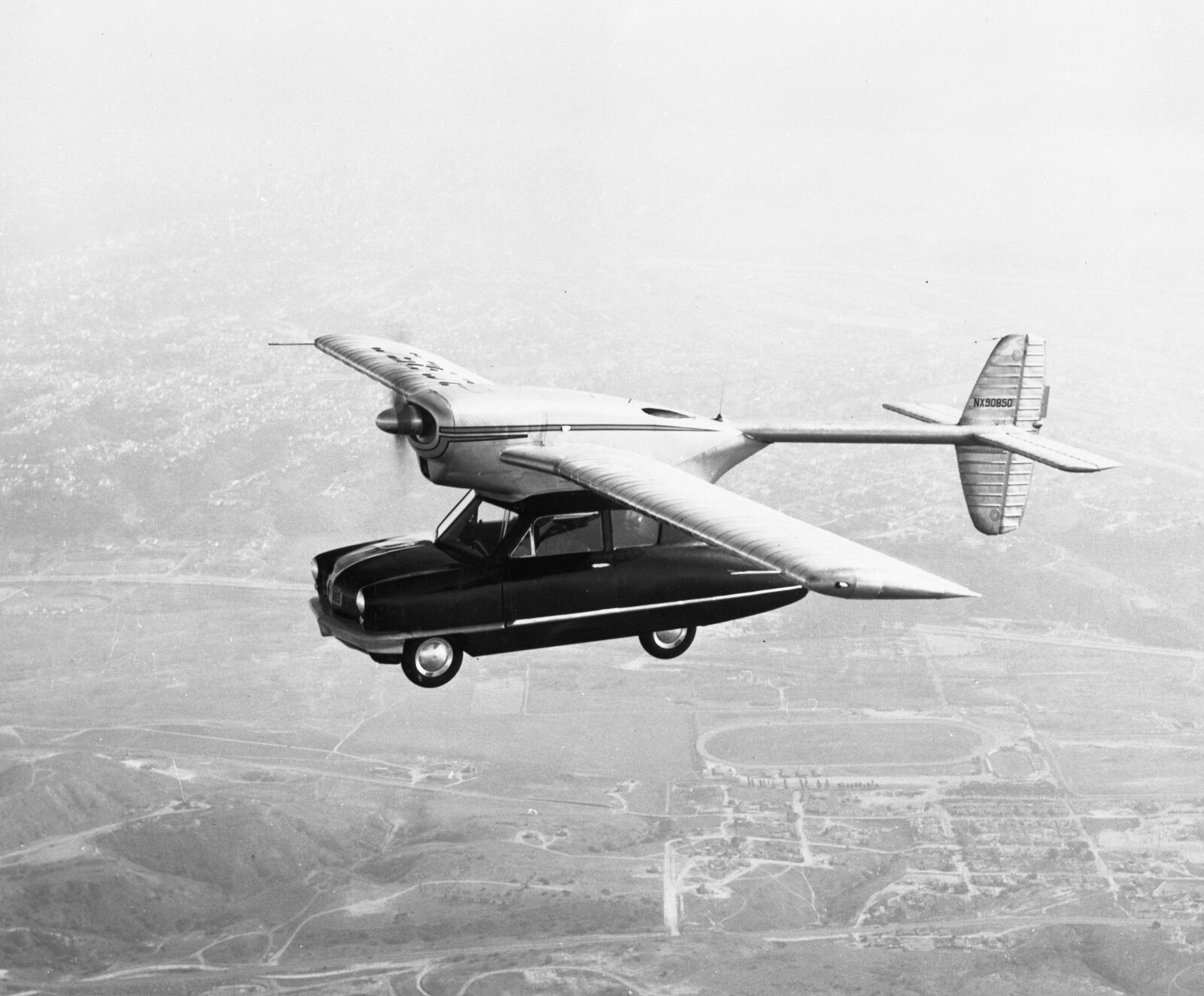
- Company photograph taken over San Diego, California, US, November 1947

General information
- Type: Flying car
- National origin: United States
- Manufacturer: Convair
- Designer: Ted Hall
- Number built: 2

History
- First flight: November 1, 1947 (Model 116: 1946)
- Developed from: Convair Model 116

The Convair Model 118 ConvAirCar (also known as the Hall Flying Automobile) was a prototype flying car intended for mainstream consumers of which two were built and flown. The first prototype was lost in an accident due to fuel exhaustion. Subsequently, the second prototype was rebuilt from the damaged aircraft and flown. By that time, little enthusiasm remained for the project and the program ended shortly thereafter.

== Design and development ==
Consolidated Vultee Aircraft (later Convair) was seeking entry into the post-war aviation boom with a mainstream flying car. Theodore P. "Ted" Hall had studied the concept of a flying car before World War II, with Consolidated unsuccessfully proposing the idea for use in commando-type raids. Following the end of the war, Hall and Tommy Thompson designed and developed the Convair Model 116 Flying Car, featured in Popular Mechanics magazine in 1946, which consisted of a two-seat car body, powered by a rear-mounted 26 hp (19 kW) engine, with detachable monoplane wings and tail, fitted with their own tractor configuration 90 hp (67 kW) Franklin 4A4 engine driving a two-bladed wooden propeller. This flew on July 12, 1946, completing 66 test flights.

Hall subsequently designed a more sophisticated development of the Model 116, with a more refined car body and a more powerful "flight" engine. A 25 hp (19 kW) Crosley engine was in the rear, powering the plastic-bodied four-seat car and a 190 hp (142 kW) Lycoming O-435C was used for the powerplant of the aircraft. A lofty production target of 160,000 was planned, with a projected $1,500 price tag. Convair anticipated that the Model 118 would be purchased in large numbers to be rented at airports.

== Operational history ==
Test pilot Reuben Snodgrass flew the prototype, registration No. NX90850, for the first time on November 15, 1947. On November 18, 1947, while on a one-hour demonstration flight, it made a low fuel forced landing near San Diego, California, destroying the car body and damaging the wing. The pilot, who escaped with minor injuries, reportedly took off with little or no aviation fuel aboard. Although the fuel gauge he had visually checked during the pre-flight check indicated that the tank was full, it was the automobile's fuel gauge, not the aircraft's gauge. Using the same wing and another car body, the second prototype flew again on January 29, 1948, piloted by W.G. Griswold, but enthusiasm for the project waned and Convair cancelled the program. The rights reverted to Hall, who formed T.R Hall Engineering Corp., but the Model 118 in its new incarnation never achieved production status.

== Specifications (Model 118) ==
Data from General Dynamics Aircraft and their Predecessors

General characteristics

- Crew: one
- Capacity: three passengers
- Wingspan: 34 ft 5 in (10.49 m)
- Height: 8 ft 4 in (2.54 m)
- Empty weight: 1,524 lb (691 kg)
- Gross weight: 2,550 lb (1,157 kg)
- Powerplant: 1 × Lycoming O-435C air-cooled flat-six, 190 hp (140 kW)
- Powerplant: 1 × Crosley air-cooled, 25 hp (19 kW) (powered the car body)

Performance

- Cruise speed: 125 mph (201 km/h, 109 kn)
