= Aerocar Aero-Plane =

Light aircraft flown in 1964

Aero-Plane
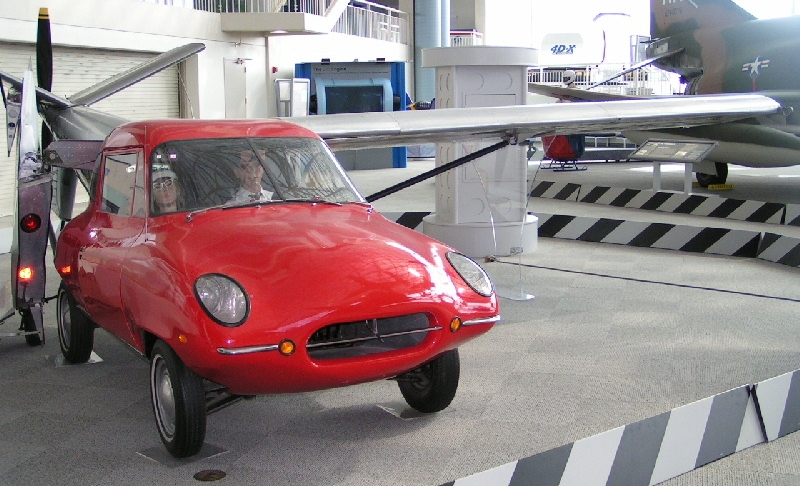
- Taylor Aerocar III, similar to the Aerocar Aeroplane

General information
- Type: Light aircraft
- National origin: United States
- Manufacturer: Aerocar
- Number built: 1

History
- First flight: 1964
- Developed from: Taylor Aerocar

The Aerocar II Aero-Plane was an unusual light aircraft flown in the United States in 1964. It was developed from designer Moulton Taylor's Aerocar roadable aircraft, but could not be driven as a road vehicle. It used the wings and tail designed for the Aerocar, with a new fibreglass cabin. Excluding the parts needed for road operation allowed two more passengers to be carried. Only a single example was built.

== Specifications (Aerocar Aero-Plane) ==
Data from Jane's All The World's Aircraft 1961–62

General characteristics

- Crew: 1
- Capacity: 3 passengers
- Length: 22 ft 9 in (6.93 m)
- Wingspan: 34 ft 0 in (10.36 m)
- Height: 7 ft 6 in (2.29 m)
- Wing area: 190 sq ft (18 m^{2})
- Empty weight: 1,200 lb (544 kg)
- Gross weight: 2,200 lb (998 kg)
- Powerplant: 1 × Lycoming O-320 air-cooled flat-four, 143 hp (107 kW)
- Propellers: 2-bladed Hartzell HA12 UF, 6 ft 4 in (1.93 m) diameter

Performance

- Maximum speed: 127 mph (204 km/h, 110 kn)
- Cruise speed: 110 mph (180 km/h, 96 kn)
- Stall speed: 50 mph (80 km/h, 43 kn)
- Range: 500 mi (800 km, 430 nmi) with auxiliary tank
- Service ceiling: 13,000 ft (4,000 m)
- Rate of climb: 750 ft/min (3.8 m/s)

== See also ==
Related development:

- Aerocar I
- Aerocar III
