= Aero Car (1919 automobile) =

Automobile manufactured between 1919 and 1920, in the United Kingdom

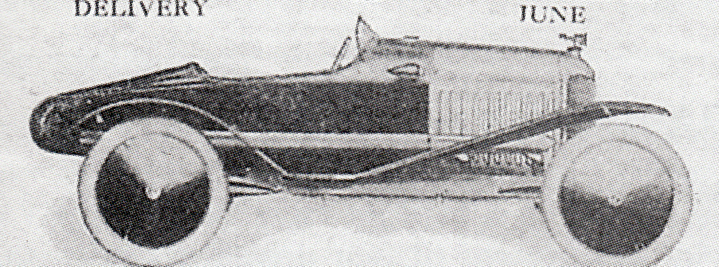
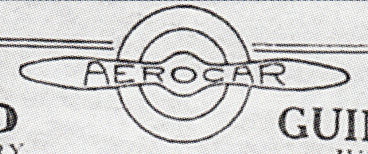
- Aero Car The logo of Aero Car Engineering Company

Overview
- Manufacturer: Aero Car Engineering Company Ltd.
- Production: 1919–1920
- Assembly: Clapton, England, United Kingdom (now part of Greater London)

Body and chassis
- Class: Cyclecar

Powertrain
- Engine: 5/7 hp (533 W) flat-twin engine cyclecar

Aero Car (also spelled as Aerocar) was a flat twin-engine cyclecar manufactured from 1919 to 1920 by Aero Car Engineering Company. It was produced in the village of Clapton, now a part of Greater London, England.

== History ==
The Aero Car was manufactured from 1919 to 1920 by Aero Car Engineering Company in the village of Clapton, now a part of Greater London, England.

== Specifications ==
Aero Car was a cyclecar with 5/7 hp (533 W) flat twin-engine cyclecar. The car featured an air-cooled flat-twin engine built by Blackburne, and a Sturmey-Archer gearbox. Its body had a bullnose radiator and a pointed tail.

== See also ==
- List of car manufacturers of the United Kingdom
