= Robert Edison Fulton Jr. =

American inventor and adventurer

Robert Edison Fulton Jr. (April 15, 1909 – May 7, 2004) was an American inventor and adventurer. He is known for having traveled around the world on a motorcycle in 1932–33, authored a book and made a film about his journey, and for several aviation-related inventions, among his 70 patents. Fulton was also a professional photographer.

== Biography ==
Fulton was born in Manhattan, New York, on April 15, 1909, and named after Thomas Edison, who was a friend of his father, Robert Edison Fulton Sr., a president of Mack Trucks. His maternal grandfather, Ezra Johnson Travis, ran stagecoach lines across the old west after the Civil War, and his uncle, Elgin Travis, who took them over from his father, eventually converted the stagecoach routes into bus lines, which became Greyhound Bus Line. As a teenager, he was in the elite when he traveled by commercial aircraft from Miami, Florida, US to Havana, Cuba, in 1921, and then to Egypt when Tutankhamun's tomb was opened in 1923. He attended middle school at Le Rosey in Lausanne, Switzerland, for two years, then went to Exeter and Choate, graduated with a degree in architecture from Harvard in 1931, and spent a further year of architectural study in Vienna at the University of Vienna. At age 23, he traveled 25,000 miles (from London to Tokyo in 18 months) on a twin-cylinder Douglas H32 Mastif motorcycle to study architecture around the world. Along the way, he shot 40,000 feet of film of his travels, over the 18-month period.

Upon his return, he detailed his adventures in a book, One Man Caravan, telling of almost being shot at in the Khyber Pass by Pathan (Pashtun) tribesmen, avoiding Iraqi bandits, spending a night in a Turkish jail, and being a guest of Indian rajahs. He went on a lecture tour of the United States, showing his film footage and telling of his journeys. In 1983, he produced, edited, and released, with his filmmaking sons, a 90-minute film compiled from his home movies, The One Man Caravan of Robert E. Fulton Jr. An Autofilmography. Later in life, he revisited his motorcycle journey in another film program retelling of the epic trip, "Twice Upon A Caravan."

He then went to work for Pan American Airways, using his skills in cinematography to document the creation of Pan American Clipper (flying boat) air routes across the Pacific Ocean, just prior to World War II. He then formed a company to manufacture aeronautical equipment, Continental Inc.

He married for the first time in 1935, to Florence (Sally) Coburn (1912–1995) of Greenwich, Connecticut, with whom he had three sons — Robert E., III (1939-2002), Travis (1943– ) of Snowmass, Colorado, and Rawn (1946– ) of Bernardston, Massachusetts. Divorced in 1982, he later married Anne Boireau Smith of Nantes, France (1926–2002). He died at his home in Newtown, Connecticut on May 7, 2004.

== Inventions ==
During World War II, Fulton invented the first ground-based aerial flight trainer, the "Aerostructor," but when the military wasn't interested, he modified it into a training aid for aerial gunners, the first fixed aerial gunnery trainer, called the "Gunairstructor".

After the war, because of the time it took to travel to demonstrate the gunnery trainer, he designed and built an airplane that was convertible to be an automobile, called the "Airphibian." Charles Lindbergh flew it in 1950 and it was the first flying car ever certified as airworthy by the Civil Aeronautics Administration (now the FAA). Although it was not a commercial success (financial costs of air worthiness certification forced him to relinquish control of the company, which never developed it further), it is now in the Smithsonian Air & Space Museum.

During the 1950s, after studying the way trains in Britain pick up mail bags by the side of the tracks, Fulton developed the Fulton surface-to-air recovery system, also called the Skyhook for the Central Intelligence Agency (CIA), the United States Navy, and the United States Air Force. It was a system that was used to pick up people from the ground with an aircraft. It was used by the United States Air Force until 1996. A sister invention for Navy frogmen was called Seasled.
