= Aerocar Micro-IMP =

Aerocar Micro-Imp

General information
- Type: Single seat light aircraft
- National origin: United States of America
- Manufacturer: Aerocar
- Number built: 1

History
- First flight: 1981
- Developed from: Aerocar IMP

The Aerocar Micro-IMP was a light sportsplane developed from the successful Mini-IMP homebuilt. Designed by Moulton Taylor and Jerry Holcomb in 1978, it was finished in 1981 and demonstrated at Oshkosh the following year.

A unique feature of the aircraft was that it was built out of fibreglass-reinforced paper – it was intended that the aircraft "kit" would be marketed printed on paper. The builder would cut out the parts and laminate them between fibreglass mats to build up the structure of the aircraft.

The Micro-IMP was ultimately a disappointment because its powerplant (taken from the Citroën 2CV) proved unsuitable, and a projected higher-powered version of the engine did not eventually become available. Holcomb later built a refined version with a different powerplant as the Ultra-IMP.

== Specifications (Micro-IMP, Citroën engine, performance estimated) ==
Data from Jane's All The World's Aircraft 1982–83

General characteristics

- Crew: 1
- Length: 15 ft 0 in (4.57 m)
- Wingspan: 27 ft 0 in (8.23 m)
- Height: 4 ft 0 in (1.22 m)
- Aspect ratio: 9:1
- Airfoil: NASA GA(PC)-1
- Empty weight: 260 lb (118 kg)
- Max takeoff weight: 525 lb (238 kg)
- Fuel capacity: 7 US Gallons (26.5 L)
- Powerplant: 1 × Citroën air-cooled flat-twin piston engine, 25 hp (19 kW)

Performance

- Maximum speed: 120 mph (190 km/h, 100 kn)
- Cruise speed: 100 mph (160 km/h, 87 kn) (econ cruise)
- Stall speed: 48 mph (77 km/h, 42 kn)
- Service ceiling: 10,000 ft (3,000 m)
- Rate of climb: 500 ft/min (2.5 m/s)

== See also ==
Related development

- IMP
- Mini-IMP
- Holcomb Perigee

Aircraft of comparable role, configuration, and era

- Rutan Quickie
