= Parajet Skycar =

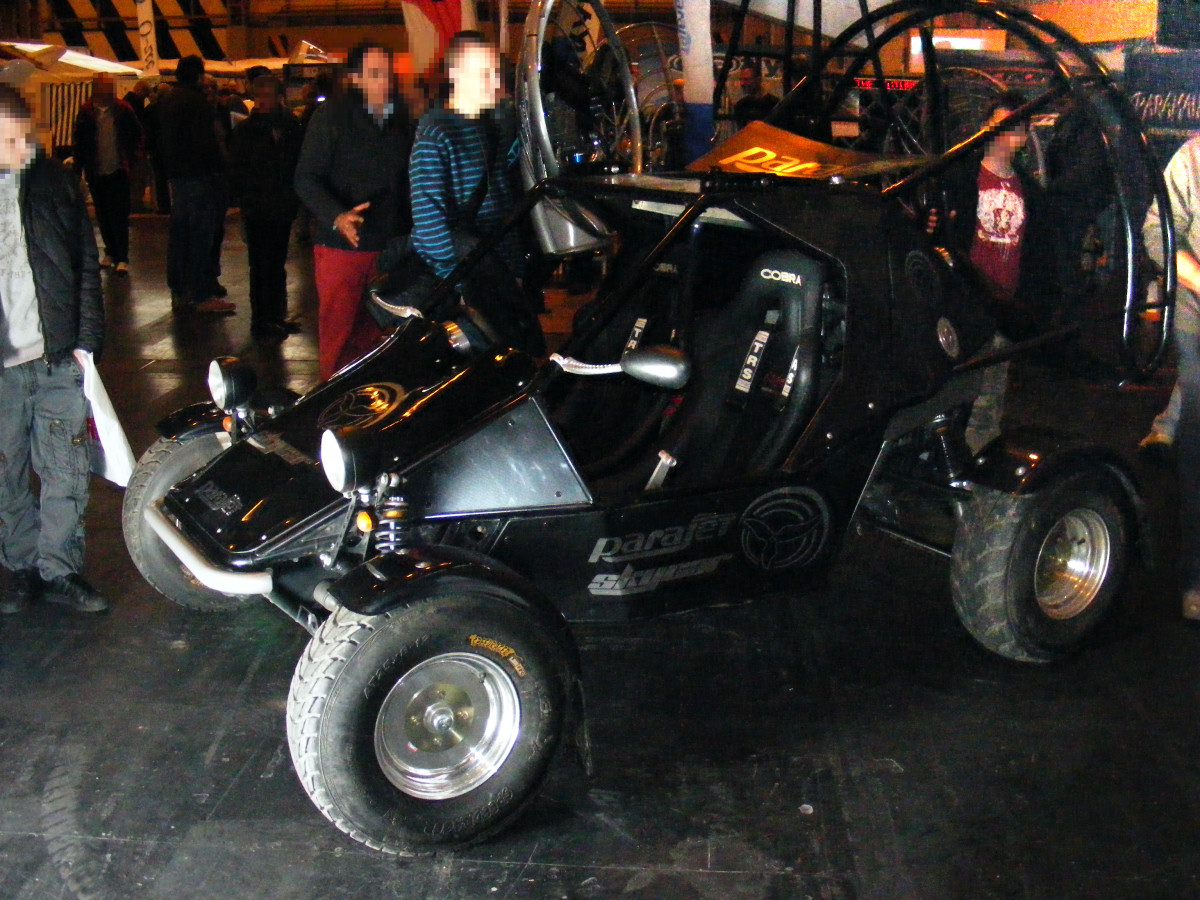
Parajet SkyCar prototype seen at the Sport and Leisure Aviation Show (SPLASH), Birmingham, UK, November 2008.

The Parajet SkyCar is a roadable aircraft developed by British paramotor manufacturer Parajet, a subsidiary of Gilo Industries. It utilises a paramotor and a Paramania ParaWing (a parafoil) attached to a roadworthy vehicle to achieve sustained level flight. Should the engine fail, the vehicle can glide back to the ground. In the event of catastrophic wing failure, car connection system failure or mid-air collision, an emergency ballistic reserve parachute would be deployed. It requires three minutes to convert it from a car to an aircraft. The prototype model runs on biodiesel and is fully road-legal.

== Skycar Expedition 2009 ==
An expedition team led by Neil Laughton set out on 15 January 2009 to fly and drive the SkyCar from London to Timbuktu. After the Civil Aviation Authority failed to grant permits in time due to confusion over how to categorise the SkyCar, the team decided to start flying the SkyCar from northern France, however, this was also not possible without permission from the CAA and the skycar was driven to southern Spain. Neil Laughton managed to fly across the Straits of Gibraltar damaging the car on landing in Morocco. After repairs, the car was driven to Mauritania where the team made a couple of short flights. Although the car was designed for two people, it never flew successfully with more than a driver / pilot. The flying portion of the expedition eventually ended when inventor Gilo Cardozo crashed into a tree in the sparsely vegetated desert while attempting to take-off for a third flight. The team deemed the expedition successfully completed on 25 February 2009 and returned the Skycar to Wiltshire, England.

Parajet is taking deposits for the public to purchase the production version of the vehicle for £50,000 each. Customers can order and reserve one of the first 50 SkyCars to leave the production line, planned for late 2010.

== Specifications ==
=== Flight Mode Specifications ===
Data from ParaJet Automotive

General characteristics

- Capacity: 2
- Wing: Custom-made Paramania Reflex Wing
- Powerplant: 1 × Modified Yamaha YZF-R1 1000 cc inline-4, 140 hp (104 kW)

Performance

- Maximum speed: 100 mph (160 km/h, 87 kn)
- Cruise speed: 82 mph (132 km/h, 71 kn)
- Range: 200 mi (322 km, 170 nmi)
- Service ceiling: 15,000 ft (4,572 m)
- Takeoff speed: 37 mph (60 km/h)
- Takeoff distance: 340 ft (150 m)

=== Car Mode Specifications ===
- Chassis: Tubular Space Frame
- Suspension: Independent Double Wishbone
- Seats: 2 FIA Approved Race Seat
- 0-62 mph (0–100 km/h): 4.2 seconds
- Top Speed: 140 mph (230 km/h)
- Gearbox: Continuously Variable Transmission (CVT)
- Fuel Tank: 35 litres
- Range: 400 miles (640 km)
