= Aerocar 2000 =

Flying car prototype

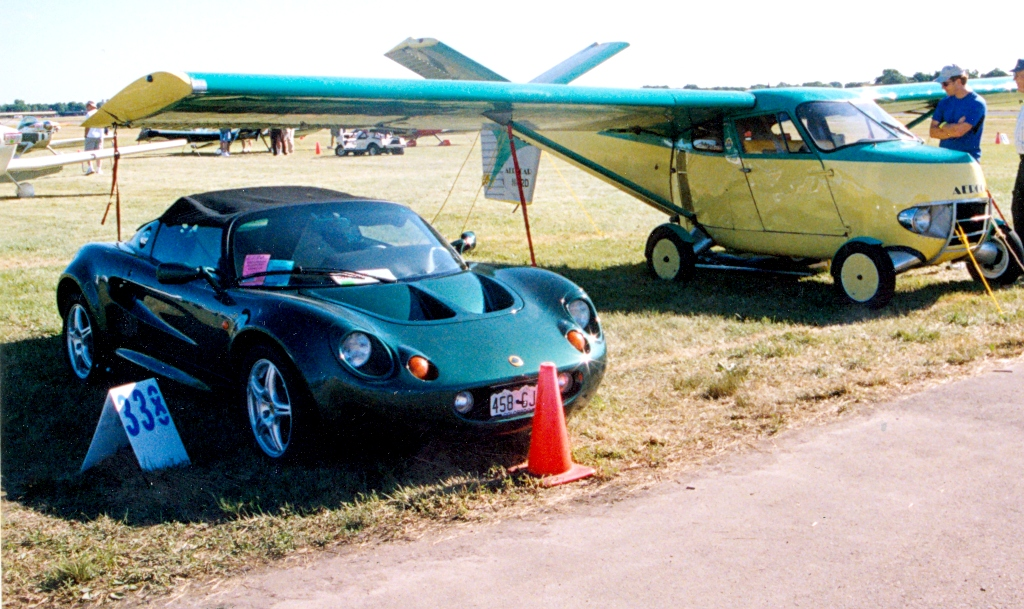
- A Lotus Elise displayed next to an Aerocar to promote the Aerocar 2000 concept

General information
- Type: Flying automobile
- National origin: United States
- Manufacturer: Aerocar
- Designer: Ed Sweeney
- Status: Halted
- Number built: 2 (Non flying)

The Aerocar 2000 was a proposed flying car under development in the early 2000s in the United States. The Aerocar 2000 was designed by Ed Sweeney, who was inspired by Moulton Taylor's Aerocar of the 1950s (and is the owner of the only still-flying example of this vehicle). The Aerocar 2000 consisted of a removable wings, tail, and powerplant "flight module" added to a modified Lotus Elise roadster.

== Comparison to original Aerocar ==
In conception, this was far closer to the AVE Mizar of the early 1970s than to Taylor's designs, the vehicle portions of which were purpose-designed and built. Another difference with the original Aerocar (and similarity to the Mizar) is that the flight module is not designed to be taken away from the airfield. Finally, while the Aerocar used the one engine to drive both the road wheels and the propeller, the Aerocar 2000 (again like the Mizar) uses two separate engines. In the Aerocar 2000's case, the flight engine is a twin-turbocharged V-8 motor from a Lotus Esprit. A far lighter three-cylinder engine and gearbox from a Chevrolet Sprint is to be installed in the road module to power the vehicle on the ground.

== Specifications (Aerocar 2000, as designed) ==
Data from The Aerocar Home Page

General characteristics

- Crew: One (pilot)
- Capacity: one passenger
- Length: 27 ft (8.2 m)
- Wingspan: 36 ft (11 m)
- Height: 10 ft 6 in (3.20 m)
- Empty weight: 2,850 lb (1,293 kg)
- Max takeoff weight: 3,450 lb (1,565 kg)
- Powerplant: 1 × Lotus 2.5L V8 piston engine, 350 hp (260 kW)
- Propellers: 3-bladed MT-Propeller constant-speed

Performance

- Cruise speed: 268 mph (431 km/h, 233 kn)
- Range: 300 mi (480 km, 260 nmi)
