= Taylor Coot =

American two-seat amphibious aircraft

Coot
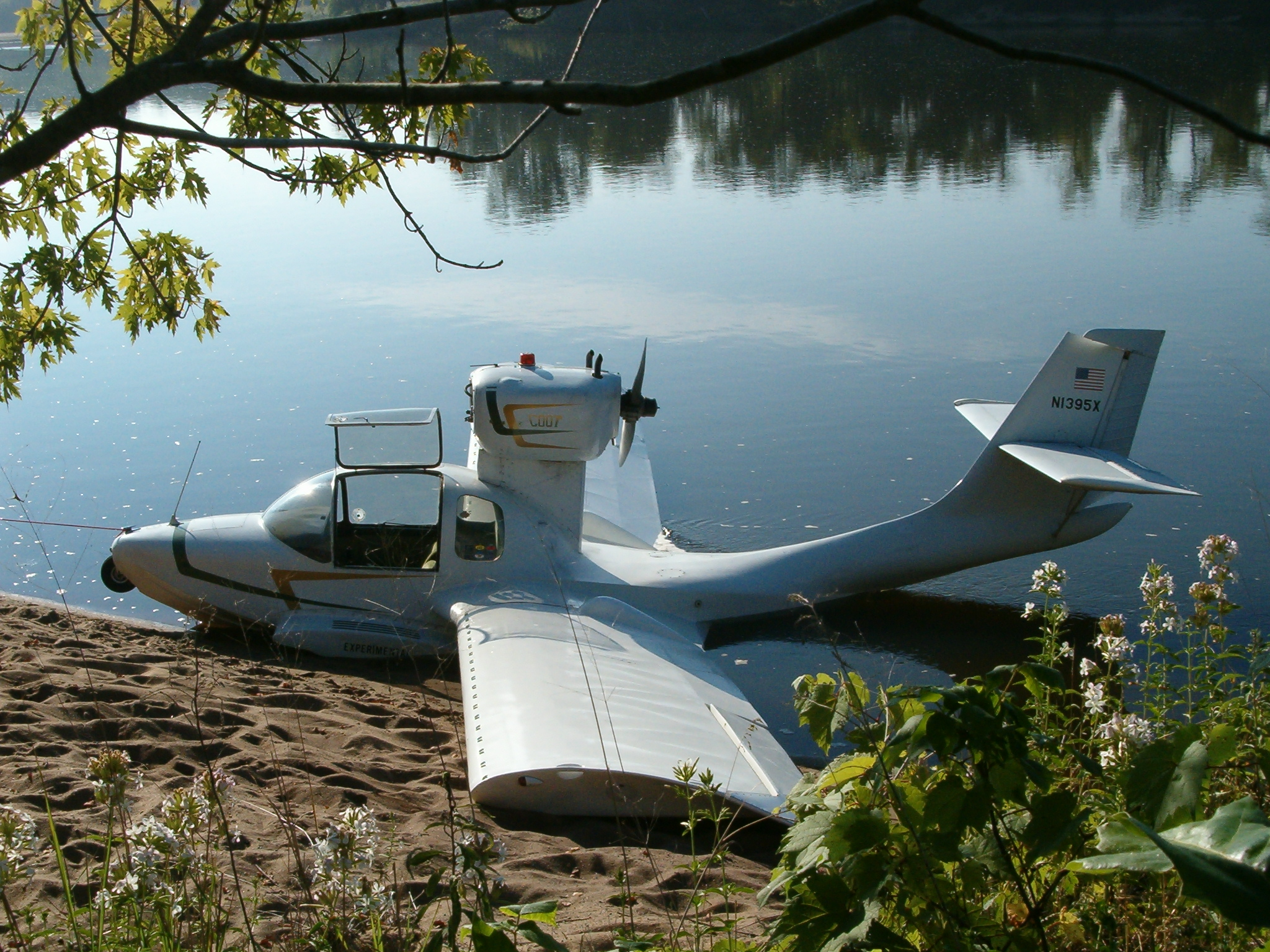

General information
- Type: Civil utility amphibian
- Manufacturer: Richard Steeves
- Designer: Moulton Taylor
- Status: Plans available (2021) https://www.coot-builders.com/builder_support.htm
- Number built: 70

History
- First flight: 1969

The Taylor Coot is a two-seat homebuilt amphibious aircraft designed by Moulton Taylor, famous for his flying car designs. When a market for the Aerocar did not emerge, Taylor turned to more conventional designs. The Coot was nonetheless somewhat unusual for its low wing, a feature uncommon on most seaplanes and flying boats, which conventionally strive to keep their wings as far away from the water as possible. Instead, Taylor designed the Coot's wing roots to act as sponsons to stabilise the craft in the water. The arrangement allowed him to do away with the weight and drag penalties imposed by wingtip floats, and additionally gain ground effect benefits during takeoff. First flown in 1969, the Coot proved very popular with homebuilders, with an estimated 70 aircraft completed by 2007.

The wings and elevator surfaces of the Taylor Coot can be folded for transport and storage. With wings folded the aircraft is 8 feet (2.4 m) wide. Some builders have equipped their aircraft with auxiliary sponsons. It is equipped with tricycle landing gear: The nose wheel casters freely and steering on the ground is accomplished with differential braking of the main gear.

The plans and three books about the Coot are available through Richard Steeves of Madison, Wisconsin.

On June 6, 2018, a Taylor Coot Model A registered as N100TN attempted to take off from a lake, but suffered hull loss. The pilot escaped through the canopy. However, the issue was determined to have been caused by the pilot choosing to take off with a known structural issue.

== Variants ==
Coot Model A
Single-tailed version.
Coot Model B
Two-tailed model

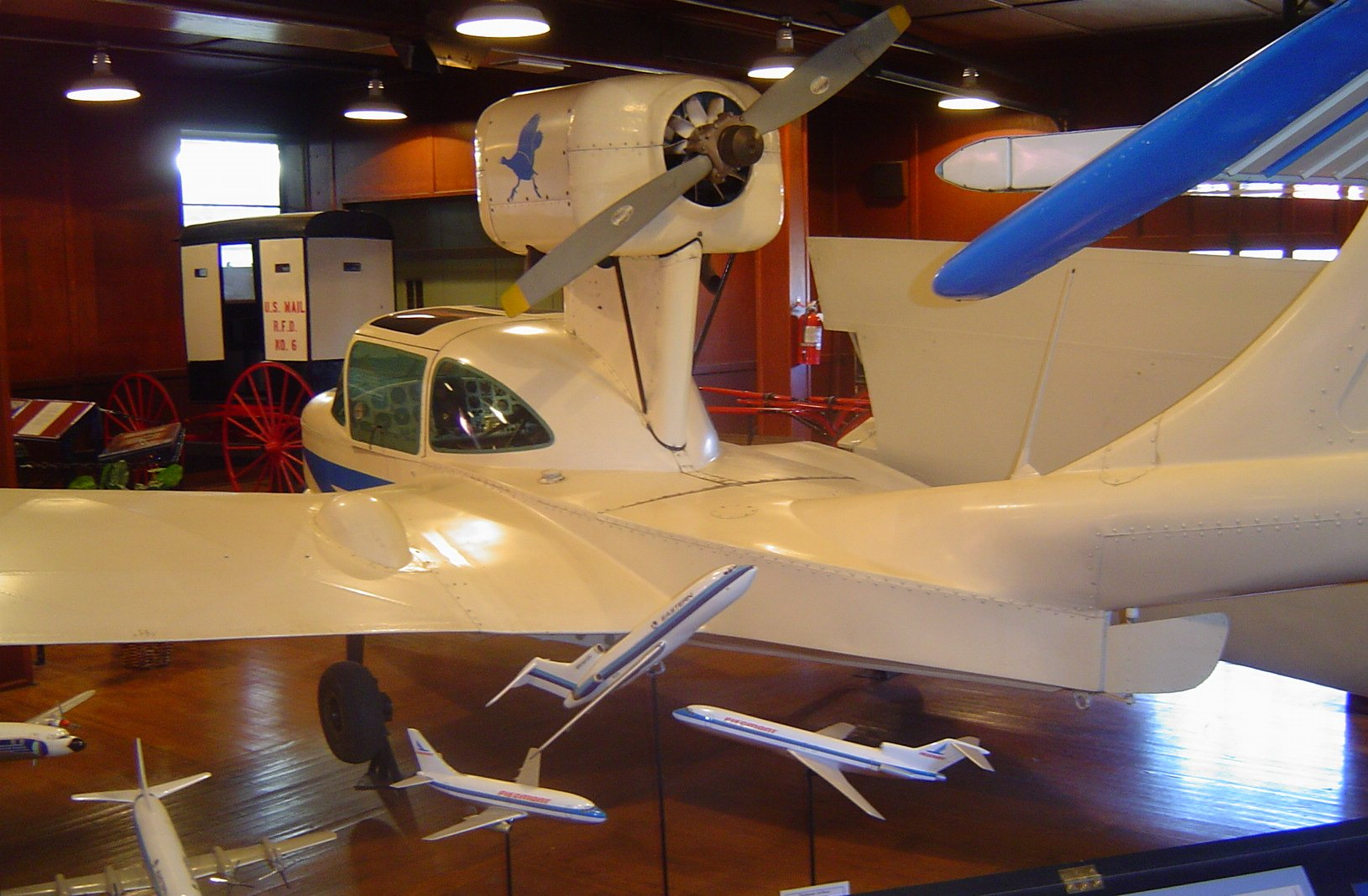
Coot A in the North Carolina Transportation Museum

== Specifications (Super Coot Model A, 180 hp Franklin engine) ==
Data from Jane's All The World's Aircraft 1982–83

General characteristics

- Crew: one pilot
- Capacity: one passenger
- Length: 22 ft 0 in (6.71 m)
- Wingspan: 36 ft 0 in (10.97 m)
- Height: 8 ft 0 in (2.44 m)
- Wing area: 180 sq ft (16.7 m^{2})
- Empty weight: 1,100 lb (499 kg)
- Max takeoff weight: 2,350 lb (884 kg)
- Powerplant: 1 × Franklin air-cooled flat-six, 180 hp (134 kW)

Performance

- Maximum speed: 130 mph (209 km/h, 113 kn)
- Cruise speed: 110 mph (177 km/h, 95.5 kn)
- Never exceed speed: 139 mph (223 km/h, 120 kn)
- Rate of climb: 1,250 ft/min (6.4 m/s)

== See also ==
Aircraft of comparable role, configuration, and era

- Volmer VJ-22 Sportsman
