= Aerocar =

Flying car

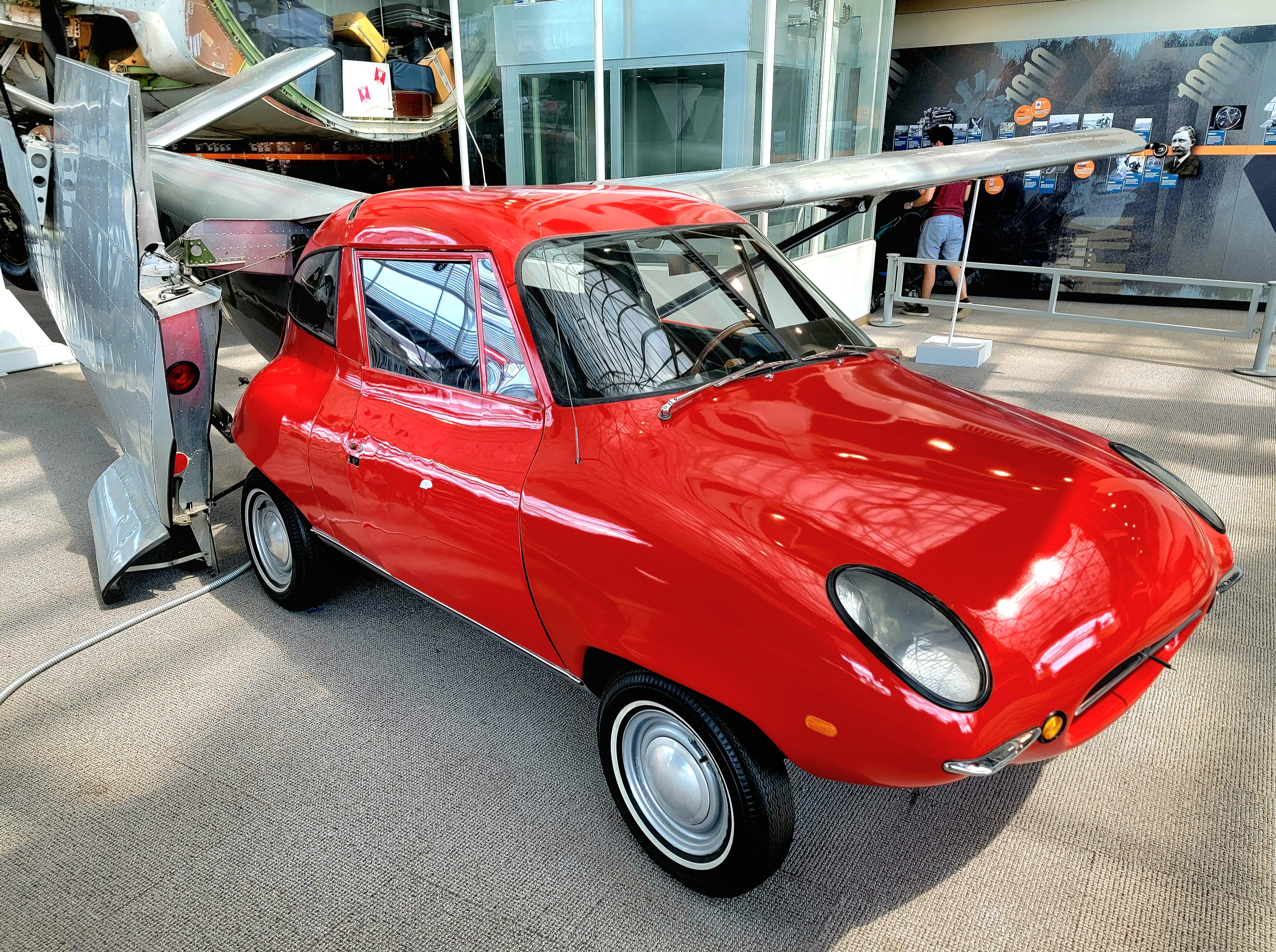
- Taylor Aerocar III on display at the Museum of Flight

General information
- Type: Roadable aircraft
- Manufacturer: Aerocar International
- Designer: Moulton Taylor
- Number built: 6

History
- First flight: 1949

Aerocar International's Aerocar (often called the Taylor Aerocar) is an American roadable aircraft designed and built by Moulton Taylor in Longview, Washington in 1949. Although six examples were made, it never entered large-scale production. It is considered one of the first practical flying cars.

== Design and development ==
Taylor began designing a roadable aircraft in 1946. During a trip to Delaware, he met inventor Robert E. Fulton, Jr., who had designed an earlier roadable airplane, the Airphibian, with detachable wings. Taylor's prototype, the Aerocar, utilized folding wings that allowed the road vehicle to be converted into flight mode in five minutes by one person. When the rear license plate was flipped up, the operator could connect the propeller shaft and attach a pusher propeller. The same engine drove the front wheels through a three-speed manual transmission. When operated as an aircraft, the road transmission was left in neutral (though backing up during taxiing was possible by the using the reverse gear). On the road, the wings and tail unit were towed behind the vehicle. Taylor also put the propeller on the back of the car so it did not have to be removed when the Aerocar went on the road. Aerocars could drive up to 60 miles per hour and had a top airspeed of 110 miles per hour. An early-1950s "Industry on Parade" film shows Taylor driving and piloting his Aerocar, as well as footage of manufacture.

== Testing and certification ==
The Civil Aeronautics Administration (CAA) granted the Aerocar civil certification in 1956, and Taylor reached a deal with Ling-Temco-Vought for serial production provided he could obtain 500 orders. When he was able to obtain only half that number, production plans ended. Only six examples were built. One is still flying as of 2008, and Taylor rebuilt another into the only Aerocar III.

== Produced examples ==
There are four Aerocar Is, one Aerocar II, and one Aerocar I that was rebuilt as Aerocar III.

=== N4994P ===
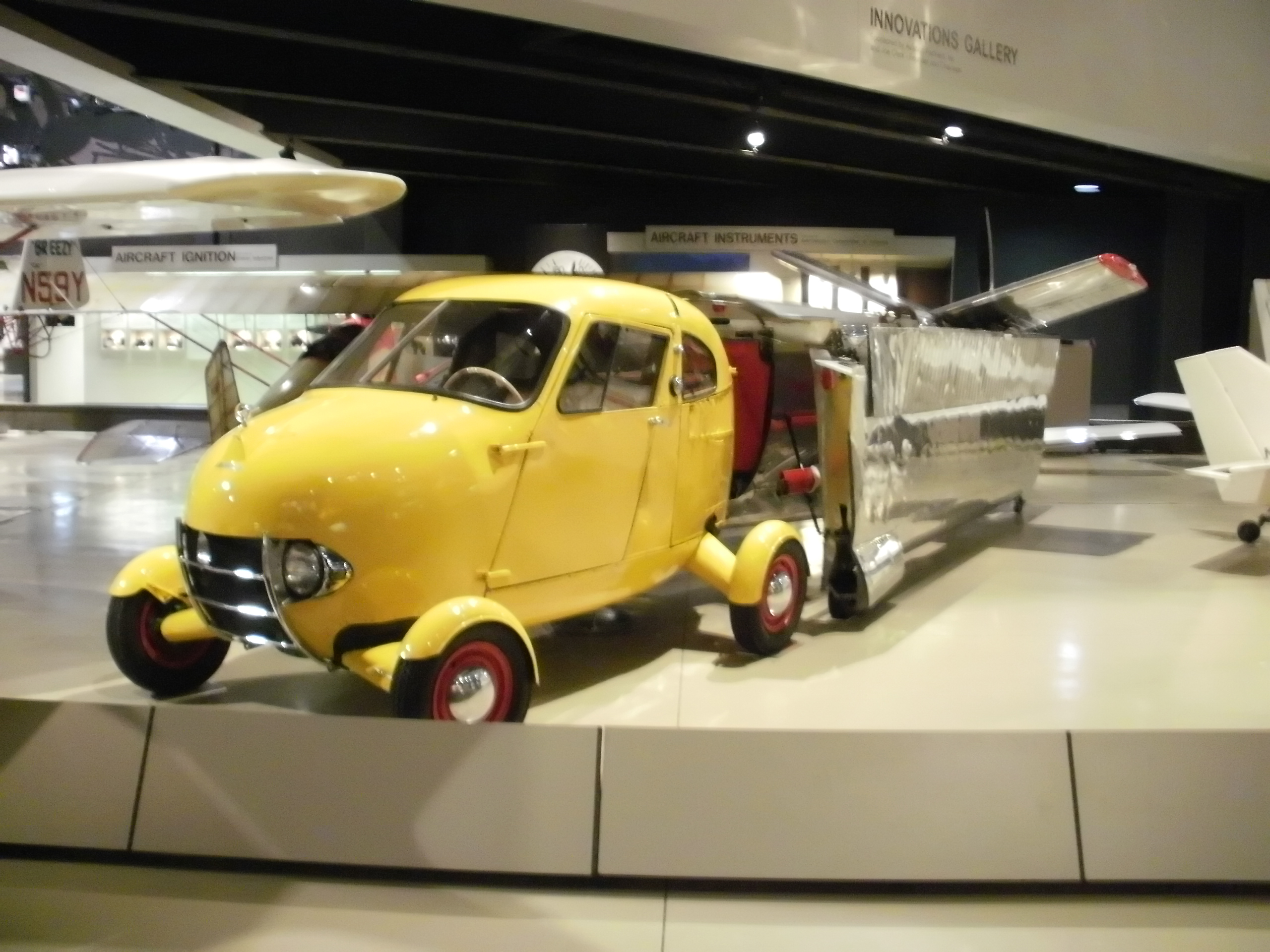
Aerocar at the EAA AirVenture Museum

N4994P (1949, originally N31214) is yellow with silver wings. It was the very first Aerocar and is on display at the EAA AirVenture Museum in Oshkosh, Wisconsin. It is maintained in flying condition but is not flown.

=== N101D ===
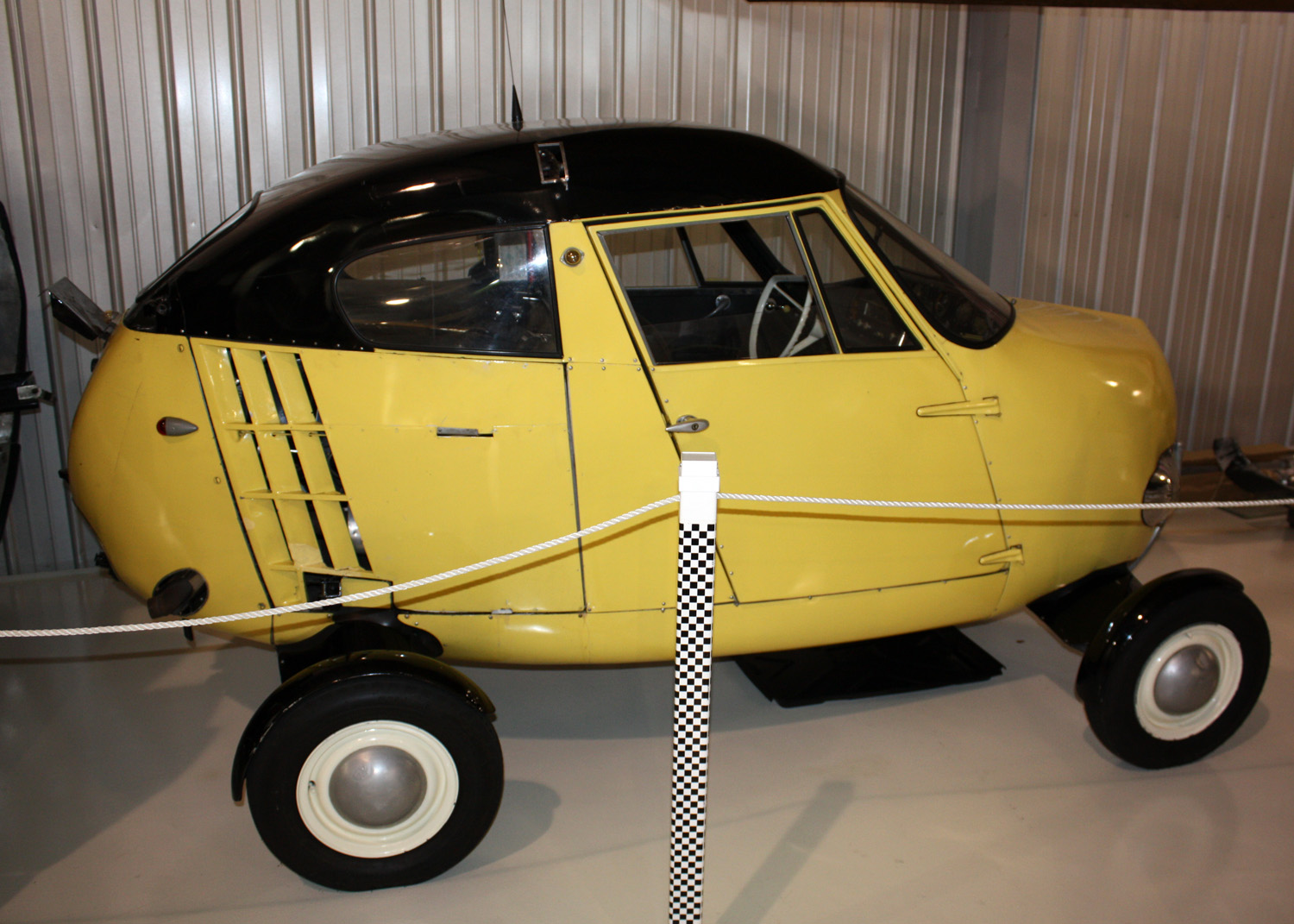
1954 Taylor Aerocar Serial Number 3 registered as N101D

N101D (1954) is owned by Greg Herrick's Yellowstone Aviation Inc. It is maintained in flying condition and is on display at the Golden Wings Flying Museum located on the south west side of the Anoka County-Blaine Airport in Minneapolis. This aircraft is featured flying overhead on the cover on the book "A Drive In the Clouds" by Jake Schultz. In December 2011, N101D was being offered for sale at an asking price of USD 1.25 million.

=== N102D ===
N102D (1960) is yellow and green. The last Aerocar built and the only one still flying, it is owned by Ed Sweeney and is on display at the Kissimmee Air Museum located at the Kissimmee Gateway Airport in Kissimmee, Florida. N102D was the only Aerocar built with the larger O-360 Lycoming powerplant giving it much better performance. It is the only road legal and driven Aerocar left. It is currently flown by the owner's son Sean Sweeney. It was previously owned by actor Bob Cummings, who used it in his TV sitcom The New Bob Cummings Show. It also appeared on the TV show James May's Big Ideas on BBC2, aired in September 2008. Inspired by this vehicle, Ed Sweeney began development of the Aerocar 2000.

=== N103D ===
N103D (1956) has been repainted to red/black with red wings. It has been owned by Carl Felling and Marilyn Stine of Grand Junction, Colorado since 1981. It once flew Fidel Castro's brother, Raúl Castro, in Cuba. The aircraft was damaged after landing on a rural road when a startled horse ran in front of the wing. A temporary fix was made using a flattened five-gallon can, and the aircraft made it to Boston without incident, for more comprehensive repairs

From 1961 to 1963 the Aerocar was operated under contract between Star Stations (Don Burden) and Wik's Air Service, Inc. It was used as a traffic-watch (AIRWATCH) aircraft for KISN (910AM) radio station in Portland, Oregon where it was flown by "Scotty Wright" (Scotty Wright was the alias used by the acting pilot of the Aerocar during traffic-watch transmissions). Several pilots provided the AIRWATCH service beginning with World War II veteran pilot Guilford Wikander, President of Wik's Air Service, Inc. Guilford was followed in order by his sister Ruth Wikander, W. John Jacob, Wayne Nutsch and Alan Maris. Scotty Wright reports Nutsch having 350 flying hours in N103D performing AIRWATCH duty. Traffic reporting was from 7:00 AM–8:30 AM and 4:30 PM–6:00 PM. During the Aerocar's AIRWATCH missions, it was painted white with red hearts and had the letters KISN on the top and bottom of the wings.

The aircraft was equipped with an emergency police/fire receiver for use in reporting emergency events on KISN radio stations broadcast. When flown for KISN it was based at Wik's Air Service, Hillsboro Airport (HIO), Hillsboro Oregon. On one of its more eventful flights for KISN it survived the Columbus Day Storm of 1962 without damage after its evening traffic reporting flight. W. John Jacob was piloting the aircraft at that particular time and should be credited with the successful landing during extreme wind conditions (perhaps more than 100 mph), but Ruth Wikander, who was in the aircraft to assist him, received the acclaim. Ruth Wikander was an active member of the 99's, the International Organization of Women Pilots. In 1962 Ruth Wikander drove the Aerocar as an automobile while trailering the wings in the annual Portland Rose Festival parade. The Aerocar was an integral part of KISN Radio along with photos of famous rock musicians and KISN DJs of the times.

Last flown in 1977, the aircraft is no longer airworthy and has been in storage ever since. It is currently listed for sale for the price of US$2.2 million.

=== N107D (Aerocar II) ===
N107D (1966) is an Aerocar Aero-Plane, or Aerocar II. It is not a roadable aircraft but is based on the original Aerocar design. It uses the wing and tail section from the Aerocar. It seats four and is powered by a 150 hp IO-320 Lycoming engine. Only a single example was built. As of 2006, it was located in Colorado Springs, Colorado owned by Ed Sweeney, the owner of N102D.

=== N4345F (Aerocar III) ===
The sixth Aerocar (N4345F), Moulton Taylor's final flying car effort, is red with silver wings. It began as one of the original Aerocars, which Taylor bought back from a customer when it was damaged in an accident on the ground in the 1960s. Taylor rebuilt it as the Aerocar III, replacing the original cabin with a sleeker, more streamlined front-wheel drive version (although it still "fell far short" of the sporty lines Taylor wanted to give it). The automotive unit weighs 1,100 lbs and is powered by a 140 hp Lycoming O-320. The trailer wheels for the wings in towed configuration are deployable from a compartment on the outside of each wing's leading edge. The propeller driveshaft contains fine ball bearings that swing outward with centrifugal force, creating stiffness and damping. The four retractable wheels are extended for takeoff and landing, partly retracted for road travel, and fully retracted in flight. Taylor attracted some interest from Ford in the Aerocar III, but no production resulted. The single prototype is displayed at Seattle's Museum of Flight with the registration N100D.

== Specifications (Aerocar I) ==
Data from Jane's All The World's Aircraft 1961–62

General characteristics

- Crew: one
- Capacity: 1 passenger
- Length: 21 ft 6 in (6.55 m)
- Wingspan: 34 ft 0 in (10.36 m)
- Height: 7 ft 6 in (2.29 m)
- Wing area: 190 sq ft (18 m^{2})
- Empty weight: 1,500 lb (680 kg)
- Gross weight: 2,100 lb (953 kg)
- Fuel capacity: 23.5 gallons
- Powerplant: 1 × Lycoming O-320 air-cooled flat-four, 143 hp (107 kW)
- Propellers: 2-bladed Hartzell HA12 UF, 6 ft 4 in (1.93 m) diameter

Performance

- Maximum speed: 117 mph (188 km/h, 102 kn)
- Cruise speed: 97 mph (156 km/h, 84 kn)
- Stall speed: 50 mph (80 km/h, 43 kn)
- Range: 300 mi (480 km, 260 nmi)
- Service ceiling: 12,000 ft (3,700 m)
- Rate of climb: 610 ft/min (3.1 m/s)
