= Otto Phantom 3500 =

Planned light twin-engine business jet

Phantom 3500

General information
- Type: Business Jet
- National origin: United States
- Manufacturer: Otto Aerospace

History
- Introduction date: planned 2030
- First flight: planned early 2027

The Otto Phantom 3500 is a light business jet developed by American startup Otto Aerospace.

== History ==
In 2024, initial wind tunnel testing validated the full laminar flow, cutting drag by 35% over rivals. By May 2025, engines, avionics, complex forgings and castings were ordered towards a 2026 final assembly, before a maiden flight in early 2027. The all-composite fuselage will be built by Leonardo S.p.A. in Grottaglie in southern Italy, Mecaer Aviation will provide the landing gear, and the fuel system will be designed and manufactured by Secondo Mona S.p.A., but the wing supplier was not selected by then. The preliminary design review should be concluded in October 2025.

Half of the billion dollar program is needed for aircraft development, the remainder to set up a final assembly line. A Series B funding round seeking hundreds of millions of dollars should be completed by the end of 2025. Four production-conforming aircraft will be used for three years of flight testing towards a US Federal Aviation Administration certification.

On September 29, 2025 the company announced a contract with Flexjet to buy 300 aircraft in a deal that would be worth approximately $5.85 billion based on market pricing.

== Design ==
Powered by a pair of 3,600 lbf (16 kN) Williams FJ44s, the Phantom 3500 should stay below the FAR Part 23 19,000 lb (8,618 kg) MTOW limit. Its passenger capacity is similar to super-midsize business jets like the Bombardier Challenger 3500 and Embraer Praetor 500 powered by 6,500–7,300 lbf (29–32 kN) Honeywell HTF7000s. Unlike other aircraft in the segment with constant-diameter fuselages, however, the Phantom's fuselage diameter is continuously variable from nose to tail. This creates a continuous arc along the cabin ceiling and provides a maximum interior height of six feet, five inches, exceeding that of large-cabin, ultra-long-range Gulfstream and Bombardier types.

The Phantom 3500 is expected have a range of 3,700 nmi (6,850 km) while burning 50% less fuel than rivals due to its lightweight design at almost one-half the MTOW, and low-drag, eschewing passenger windows to maintain laminar flow.

Its 50,000 ft cruise altitude would reduce drag and would be above the contrail formation zone. An intercontinental range of 4,300 nmi (8,000 km) could be reached through a higher weight as some requirements from the more-stringent Part 25 are included. Otto's laminar flow technology would be applicable to a 75 seats regional jet.

The plane is windowless, and instead lined with digital panes that display a virtual view of the outdoors. The virtual windows are powered by high-resolution cameras on the outside of the aircraft, and the lack of windows make the aircraft more aerodynamic.

== Specifications ==
Data from Flight

General characteristics

- Powerplant: 2 × Williams FJ44 turbofan, 3,600 lbf (16 kN) thrust each

Performance

- Maximum speed: Mach <0.8
- Range: 3,700 nmi (4,300 mi, 6,900 km)
- Service ceiling: 50,000 ft (15,000 m)

== See also ==
Aircraft of comparable role, configuration, and era

- Otto Celera 500L
- Bombardier Challenger 3500
- Embraer Praetor 500
