= RED A03 =

Aircraft diesel engine

A03
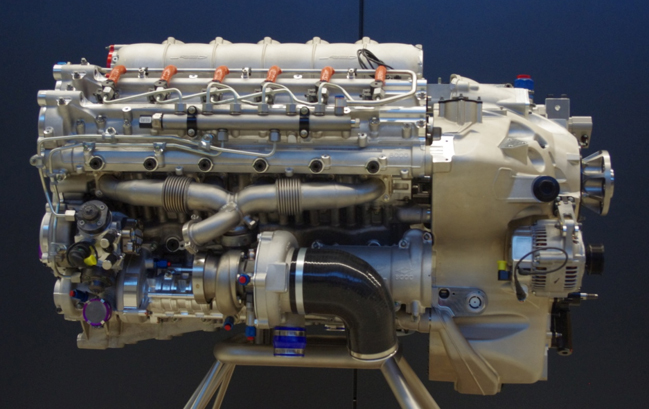
- RED A03 V-12 engine
- Type: Aircraft diesel engine
- National origin: Germany
- Manufacturer: RED Aircraft GmbH
- First run: 2009

The RED A03 is a V12 four-stroke aircraft diesel engine designed and built by RED Aircraft GmbH of Adenau, Germany.

== Development ==
In 2012, its unit cost was US$170,000. The engine received type approval from the European Union Aviation Safety Agency in December 2014 for use in any CS-23 aircraft in both normal and utility categories. It powered the Yakovlev Yak-152 trainer on its 29 September 2016 first flight. The RED A03 is presented by the ILA Berlin Air Show in 2020 as an application in the aerobatic sector and for defence and security.

The engine is proposed for the Hybrid Air Vehicles Airlander 10, a British hybrid airship design, powered by four engines and can be operated with two. In November 2021, an Air Tractor AT-301 made a first flight retrofitted with a RED A03 engine. The same month, a prototype Otto Celera 500L powered by a RED A03 engine was flown using Sustainable Aviation Fuel. On 18 November 2022, Ampaire flew its Eco-Caravan maiden flight: the hybrid electric aircraft uses a RED A03 engine to reduce fuel consumption by 70% on shorter trips to 50% on longer ones. Useful load decreased by 800 lb (360 kg), while range improved from 1,070 nmi (1,980 km) to 1,100 nmi (2,000 km); supplemental type certificate (STC) is targeted for 2024.

As of March 2023, there were reliable reports of flight testing on a DHC-2 Beaver.

== Design ==
It has twin double overhead camshafts. A marine version was planned for 522 kW/700 hp at 3,900 rpm. The cylinder banks' angle is 80 degrees. The RED A03-200 series is a derivative developed for very high-altitude operation up to 15 km (49,000 ft), with a maximum rating of 460 hp (340 kW) at FL250.

== Certifications ==
The engine has EASA certification from 2014, FAA certification from 2016 and Russian Federal Air Transport Agency (FATA) from 2021

== Applications ==
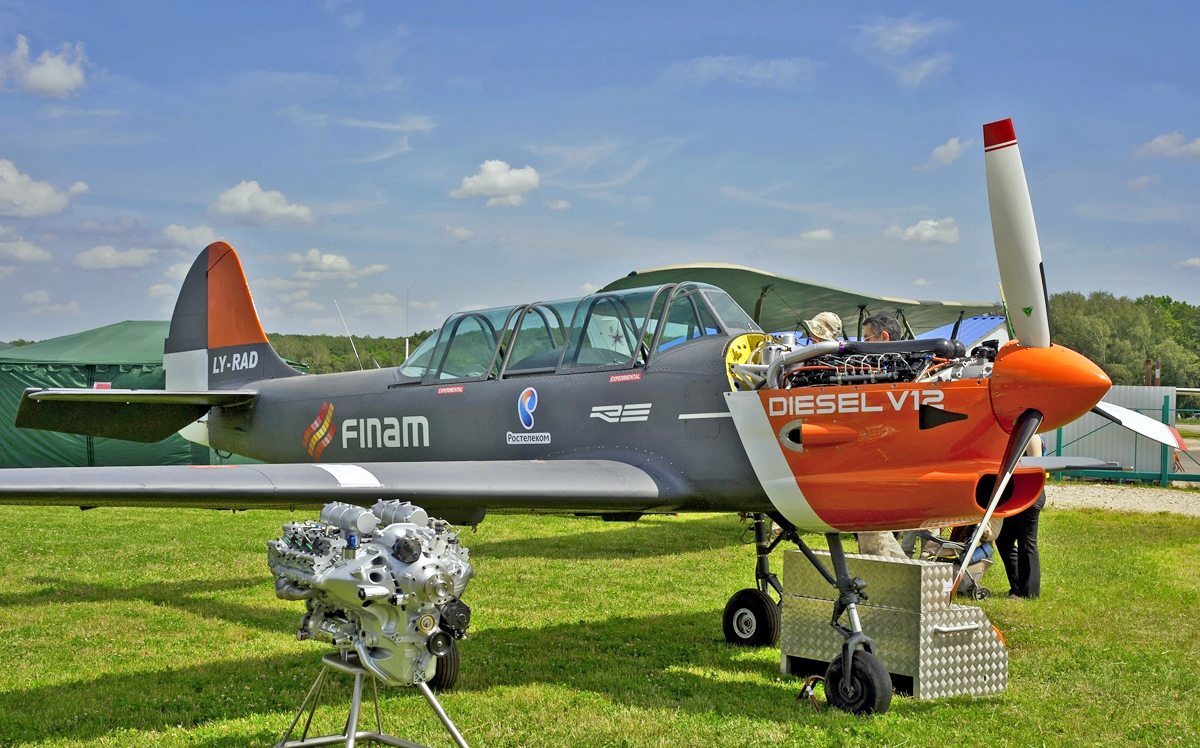
RED A03 installed in a Yakovlev Yak-52

Agricultural aircraft

- Air Tractor AT-301 (STC planned)
- Fletcher FU-24

Airship

- Hybrid Air Vehicles Airlander 10 (proposed)

Utility aircraft

- Ampaire Eco-Caravan (STC targeted for 2024).
- De Havilland Canada DHC-2 Beaver (STC planned)
- Junkers Ju 52NG
- In-development twin-engine utility aircraft for 9-14 passengers or cargo from Russian Pro-Avia

Business aircraft

- Otto Celera 500L (experimental)

Trainer aircraft

- Yakovlev Yak-18
- Yakovlev Yak-52 and Yakovlev Yak-152 trainers

UAV

- Russian unmanned combat aerial vehicle Sokol Altius prototype. Blocked by the sanctions on the Russian Federation.

== Specifications ==
Data from EASA Type-Certificate Data Sheet

=== General characteristics ===
- Type: 80° V-12 four-stroke compression-ignition piston engine
- Bore: 86 mm (3.39 in)
- Stroke: 88 mm (3.46 in)
- Displacement: 374.3 cu in (6,134 cc)
- Length: 1,114 mm (44 in)
- Width: 850 mm (33 in)
- Height: 750 mm (30 in)
- Dry weight: 363 kg (800 lb) (RED A03-003/005), 357 kg (787 lb)(RED A03-102) dry

=== Components ===
- Valvetrain: Gear-driven DOHC
- Turbocharger: 2 intercooled
- Fuel system: Common rail
- Fuel type: jet-fuel, kerosene-type/diesel, SAF (certification in progress)
- Oil system: Dry-sump, dual-circuit
- Cooling system: Liquid, dual circuit
- Reduction gear: 1:1.88
- single lever FADEC/EECS

=== Performance ===
- Power output: A03-003: 368 kW (493 hp) take-off at 2,127 propeller rpm; 338 kW (453 hp) maximum continuous at 1,995 propeller rpm, A03-005: 405 kW (543 hp)
- Specific fuel consumption: 210 g/kWh (0.35 lb/(hp⋅h)) at 300 kW (400 hp), 1,862 propeller rpm, sea level

== RED A05 300hp V6 ==
The RED A05 is a 2017 preliminary design of a V6 engine with 3,550 cc (217 cu in) displacement, outputting 300 hp (220 kW) at takeoff at 2127 propeller RPM and 280 hp (210 kW) continuously at 1995 propeller RPM, with a 210 g/kWh (0.35 lb/(hp⋅h)) best brake specific fuel consumption.

== See also ==
- Lycoming IO-580
- Lycoming IO-720
- Continental IO-550
