= Hybrid plane =

Hybrid plane may refer to:

- Hybrid electric aircraft, battery and fossil fuel aircraft
- London plane, a tree
