= Camarillo Airport =

Public airport in Camarillo, California, US

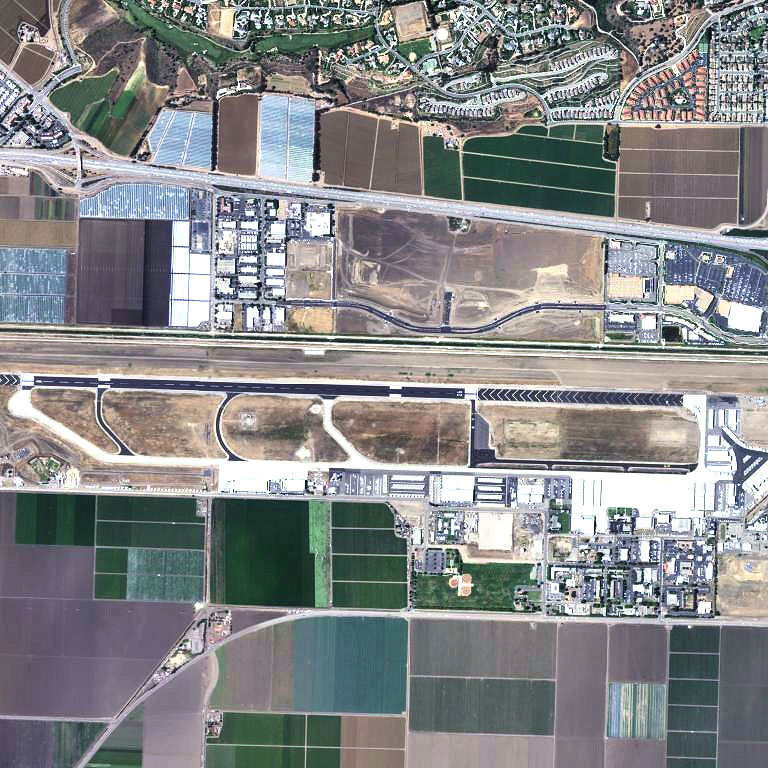
- 2006 USGS photo
- IATA: none; ICAO: KCMA; FAA LID: CMA

Summary
- Airport type: Public
- Owner: County of Ventura
- Location: Camarillo, California, US
- Elevation AMSL: 77 ft (23 m)
- Coordinates: 34°12′50″N 119°05′40″W
- Website: vcairports.org
- Interactive map of Camarillo Airport

Runways
Direction	Length		Surface
Direction	ft	m	Surface
8/26	6,013	1,833	Asphalt/concrete

Helipads
Number	Length		Surface
Number	ft	m	Surface
H1	50	15	Asphalt
H2	50	15	Asphalt

Statistics (2020)
- Aircraft operations: 108,566
- Based aircraft: 383
- Source: US Federal Aviation Administration

Camarillo Airport (ICAO: KCMA, FAA LID: CMA) is a public airport located three miles (5 km) west of the central business district of Camarillo, a city in Ventura County, California, United States. The airport has one runway and serves privately operated general aviation and executive aircraft with no scheduled commercial service. A separate, uncontrolled runway in the southwest quadrant of the airport is for exclusive use of light-sport aircraft and ultralights, and is not connected to the larger airport. The airport is the site for an annual air show "Wings Over Camarillo", organized by the Southern California Wing of the Commemorative Air Force.

According to the US Federal Aviation Administration's National Plan of Integrated Airport Systems for 2011–2015, it is categorized as a reliever airport.

== History ==
Camarillo Airport was established in 1942 when the U.S. Public Roads Administration acquired 100 acres (40 ha) of farmland to develop a landing strip for light planes. California State Highway Department constructed an auxiliary landing field with a 5,000 ft (1,500 m) runway, which was later extended to 8,000 ft (2,400 m) in 1951 to accommodate what by then had developed into Oxnard Air Force Base. The Aerospace Defense Command, via the 414th Fighter Group at Oxnard AFB, directed the 354th, 437th, and 460th Fighter-Interceptor Squadrons successively.

In the years following the closure of Oxnard AFB in January 1970, the Ventura County government actively pursued the acquisition of the former military base property from the Department of Defense for commercial airport use. This initiative ran into public opposition, opposed primarily by local residents concerned about the noise of growing commercial traffic. In 1976, the transfer of the airport was finally approved, provided the runway length was shortened to 6,000 feet (1,800 m) by displacing the runway threshold each end, substantially at the eastern end. The agreement also did not allow cargo and large commercial passenger flights. By 1985, the airport was entirely managed by the Ventura County Department of Airports.

From 1995 to 2012, one of the last Lockheed EC-121 Warning Stars underwent a major restoration and dominated the tarmac. After completion of work, it was flown out to the Yanks Air Museum in Chino, California. The Ventura County Department of Airports began work in 2022 on a layout plan dealing with maintenance and other near-term projects for the airport.

On October 8, 2020 the Ampaire Electric EEL completed the longest flight to date for an airplane employing electric propulsion after launching from the airport. The hybrid electric aircraft, developed by U.S. startup Ampaire, will be used in a series of demonstration flights with Mokulele Airlines on its short-haul routes. The plane had just undergone four weeks of flight testing over the Oxnard Plain.

== Facilities and operations ==
Camarillo Airport covers an area of 650 acres (260 ha) and contains one runway (8/26) which measures 6,013 x 150 ft (1,833 x 46 m). It has two helipads, both measuring 50 by 50 ft (15 x 15 m).

For the 12-month period ending December 31, 2020 the airport had 108,566 aircraft operations, an average of 297 per day: 94% general aviation, 2% air taxi and 3% military. There were 383 aircraft based at this airport: 301 single engine, 35 multi-engine, 24 jet aircraft, 22 helicopters, and 1 glider.

The airport is an FAA-towered facility, with a number of Fixed-Base Operators headquartered at the airfield, including vintage aviation organizations, flight schools, charter airlines, aircraft maintenance providers, and aircraft dealers.

The Camarillo Composite Squadron 61 of the California Wing of the Civil Air Patrol is based at this airfield, located near Sky Blue Air, at the east end of the airport.

The Ventura County Fire Department and Sheriff's Office each support large, separate facilities at opposite ends of the field to support new recruit and recurring refreshment training.

A "Viewport" opened in 2014, providing a child-friendly area to view the airport activities which had become difficult with increased security concerns.

The Chapter 723 of the Experimental Aircraft Association and its facilities are located to the west of CAF museum in two hangars.

== CAF Southern California Wing and Air Museum ==
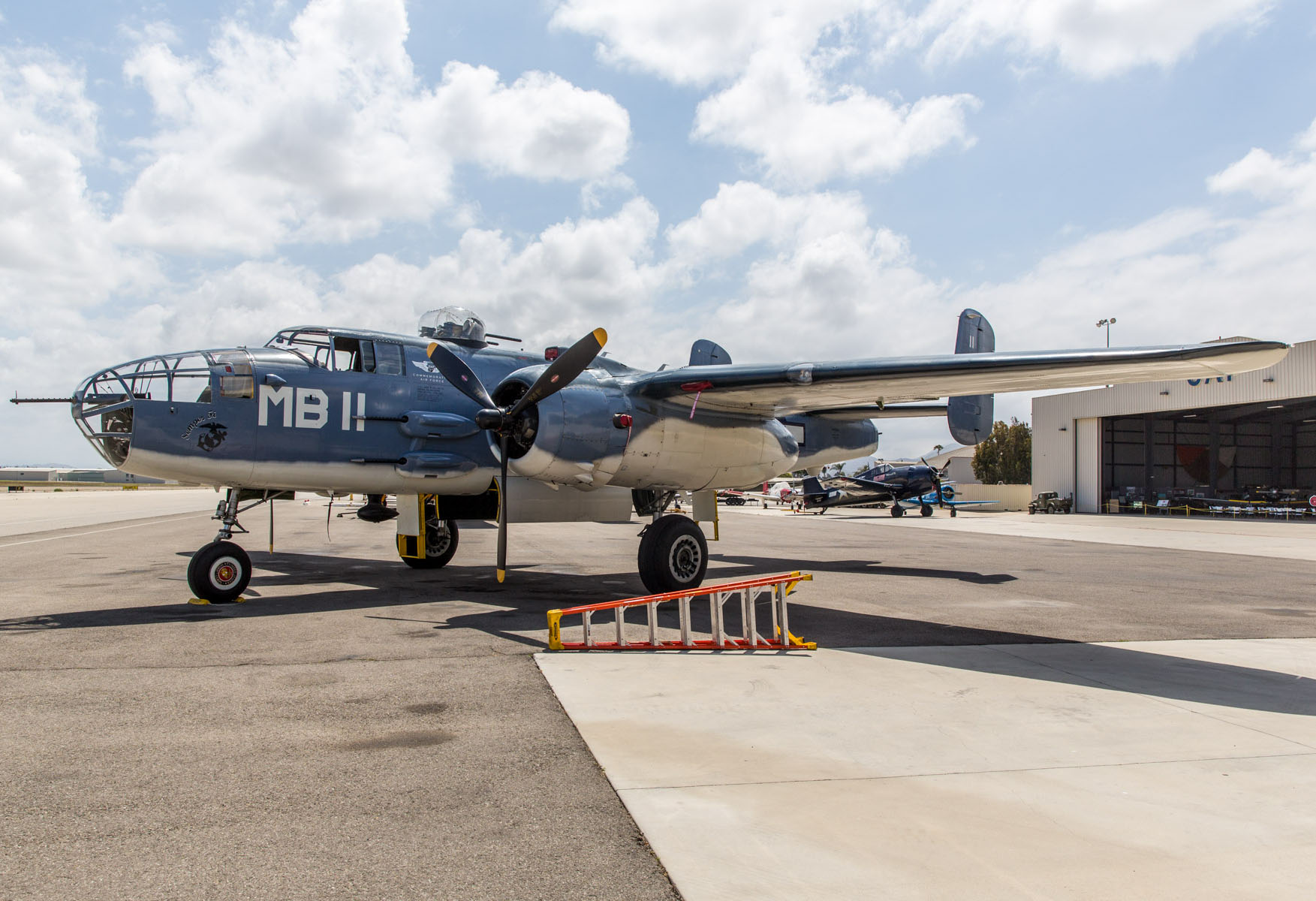
PBJ-1J Semper Fi on the CAF ramp

The Southern California Wing of the Commemorative Air Force and its museum are located to the west of the Waypoint Cafe in three large hangars. It is home to a variety of flyable historic aircraft — maintained and operated entirely by volunteers — as well as static aircraft, displays, models, and historical artifacts. The collection of flyable aircraft includes a PBJ-1J Mitchell (the only surviving example), A6M3 mod. 22 Zero, F6F-5 Hellcat, Bf 108 D-1, and Spitfire FR Mk. XIVe, along with privately owned aircraft (such as a MiG-17F) on public display. The unit features a Cadet Program which introduces kids and young adults to the aviation and aerospace sectors, and provides them scholarship opportunities for flight training.

== Accidents and incidents ==
- On July 20, 2007, a North-American P-51 Mustang, carrying a single pilot flipped during landing and resulted in the death of the pilot onboard. The pilot had been practicing with an instructor earlier that day, and the crash occurred during the pilot's first solo landing.
- On November 9, 2018, Todd McNamee, the Ventura County Director of Airports drove his personal vehicle at high-rates-of-speed down Camarillo Airport's runway around 7:00am, before crashing into a ditch off the western edge of the airport. McNamee was found by Ventura County Fire Department fire crews after the vehicle caught fire, and the investigation conducted by the Ventura County Sheriff's Office determined the act to be an intentional suicide.
- On August 7, 2019, a private aircraft from Wheeler Express crashed 1,000 feet (300 m) from the runway of the airport. Both people on board were killed.
- On October 8, 2019, a single engine, home-built aircraft crashed into a field southwest of Camarillo Airport shortly after takeoff. The aircraft, a Bede BD-5, was destroyed in a post-crash fire, which also claimed the life of the 82 year old solo-pilot onboard.
- On January 26, 2020, a helicopter en route to Camarillo Airport crashed into a hillside in Calabasas, California, under heavy fog, killing all nine people on board, including basketball player Kobe Bryant. The cause of the crash was pilot error and spatial disorientation.
- On June 10, 2022, a small piston aircraft carrying a single pilot impacted the terrain west of the airport shortly after takeoff, resulting in the death of the pilot and the total destruction of the aircraft. The aircraft, a Mooney M20K, enroute from Camarillo Airport to Phoenix Deer Valley Airport, was being operated by a single-pilot at the time of the crash. Reports of the accident came from witnesses traveling on US Route 101, who reported a low-flying aircraft impacting a building, crashing into a field and subsequently starting a fire. The initial investigation deemed IMC (Instrument Meteorological Conditions) to be the leading cause for the eventual CFIT (Controlled Flight-Into-Terrain), despite the pilot holding an Instrument Rating.
- On August 18, 2022, an ultra-light aircraft operated by a single-pilot crashed upside-down onto the hangars located at Camarillo Airport's Ultralight Park. The pilot, the only person onboard the aircraft during the time of the accident, sustained critical injuries and was airlifted to the Ventura County Medical Center.
- On January 30, 2024, a light-experimental aircraft carrying two passengers en route from Santa Monica Municipal Airport to Camarillo Airport was forced to make an emergency landing in a field approximately 4.5 miles southeast of Camarillo Airport. Both passengers were able to evacuate the aircraft before fire crews arrived, with one passenger being in critical condition. The aircraft, a Raptor Junior 540, suffered an electrical and engine failure, and was forced to make an emergency landing after repeated attempts by the pilot to restart the aircraft.
- On July 25, 2024, a small bi-plane carrying a single pilot overturned on the runway at Camarillo Airport, the pilot was able to walk away unharmed, and authorities quickly responded to the incident.

== "Wings Over Camarillo" Air Show ==
Camarillo Airport continues to host the "Wings Over Camarillo" Air Show every year around the month of August. The airshow traces it roots back to the 1980s and will be celebrating its 45th Annual "Wings Over Camarillo" Air Show in August 2026. During the Air Show, the Ventura County Department of Airports puts a high regard on safety, and hasn't seen a single accident in over 40 years.
