= AVE Mizar =

Flying car by Advanced Vehicle Engineers

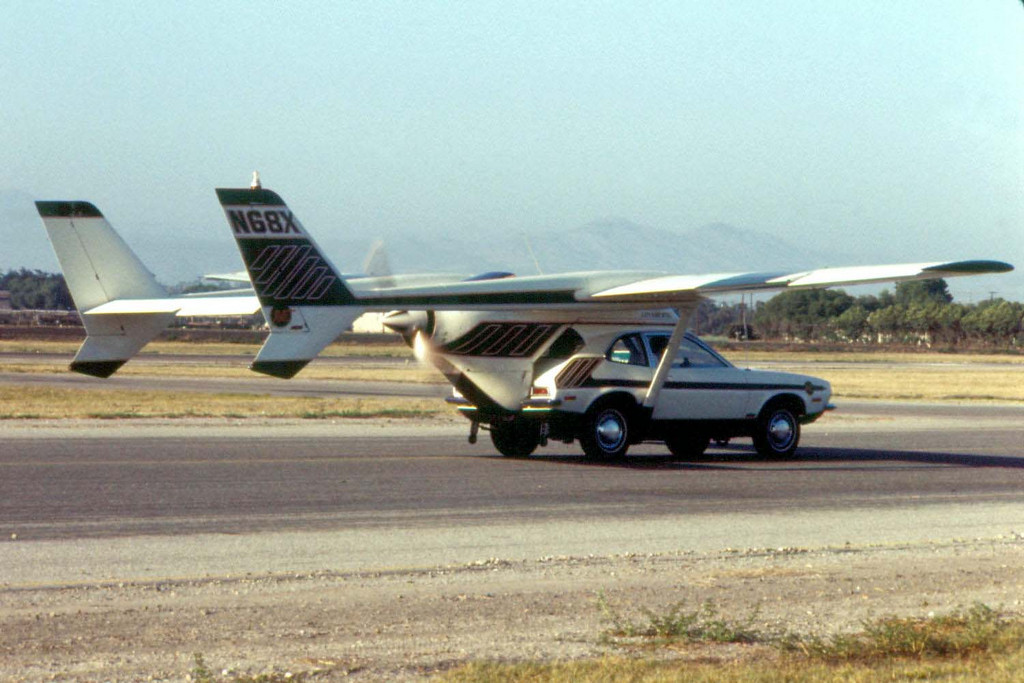
- A Mizar at Oxnard Airport, Oxnard, California, August 1973

General information
- Type: Roadable aircraft
- National origin: United States
- Manufacturer: Advanced Vehicle Engineers
- Designer: Henry Smolinski
- Number built: 2

History
- Introduction date: 1973
- Developed from: Ford Pinto, Cessna Skymaster

The AVE Mizar (named after the star Mizar) was a roadable aircraft built between 1971 and 1973 by Advanced Vehicle Engineers (AVE) of Van Nuys, Los Angeles, California. The company was started by Henry Smolinski and Harold Blake, both graduates of Northrop Institute of Technology's aeronautical engineering school.

== Development ==
=== Prototypes ===
The prototypes of the Mizar were made by mating the rear portion of a Cessna Skymaster to a Ford Pinto. The pod-and-twin-boom configuration of the Skymaster was a convenient starting point for a hybrid automobile/airplane. The passenger space and front engine of the Skymaster were removed, leaving an airframe ready to attach to a small car. AVE planned to have its own airframe purpose-built by a subcontractor for production models, rather than depending on Cessna for airframes.

By mid-1973, two prototypes had been built and three more were under construction. One prototype was slated for static display at a Van Nuys Ford dealership, owned by AVE partner Bert Boeckmann. The other prototype, fitted with a Teledyne Continental Motors 210 horsepower (160 kW) engine, was unveiled to the press on May 8, 1973. Both vehicles were photographed by Petersen Publishing photographer Mike Brenner for Hot Rod magazine in late April. It then began a series of taxi tests at Van Nuys Airport. AVE made special arrangements to do flight testing at the U.S. Navy's test facilities at Naval Air Station Point Mugu, California. AVE stated that Federal Aviation Administration certification flights were underway in mid-1973.

The Mizar was intended to use both the aircraft engine and the car engine for takeoff. This would considerably shorten the takeoff roll. Once in the air, the car engine would be turned off. Upon landing, the four-wheel braking would stop the craft in 525 ft (160 m) or less. On the ground, telescoping wing supports would be extended and the airframe would be tied down like any other aircraft. The Pinto could be quickly unbolted from the airframe and driven away.

Production was scheduled to begin in 1974. AVE had stated that prices would range from US$18,300 to $29,000.

=== Test flights ===
On a test flight from Camarillo Airport in California on August 26, 1973, according to test pilot Charles "Red" Janisse, the right wing strut base mounting attachment failed soon after takeoff. Because turning the aircraft would put too much stress on the unsupported wing, Janisse put the aircraft down in a bean field. After the roadway was closed to traffic, Janisse drove the otherwise undamaged aircraft back to the airport.

On September 11, 1973, during a test flight at Camarillo, the right wing strut again detached from the Pinto. With Janisse not available for this test flight, Mizar creator Smolinski was at the controls. Although some reports say the Pinto separated from the airframe, air traffic controller Reed Weske, who was watching through binoculars, said the aircraft disintegrated after taking off and making a right turn. According to Janisse, the wing folded because the pilot tried to turn the aircraft when the wing strut support failed. Smolinski and the Vice President of AVE, Harold Blake, were killed in the resulting crash.

=== Analysis ===
Even though the Pinto was a light car, the total aircraft without passengers or fuel was already slightly over the certified gross weight of a Skymaster. However, in addition to poor aircraft design and loose parts, the National Transportation Safety Board reported that bad welds were partly responsible for the crash, with the right wing strut attachment failing at a body panel of the Pinto.

== Specifications ==
Data from Special Use Vehicles: An Illustrated History of Unconventional Cars and Trucks Worldwide and Peterson's Complete Ford Book

General characteristics

- Crew: one, pilot
- Capacity: three passengers
- Length: 28 ft 0 in (8.5 m)
- Wingspan: 38 ft 0 in (11.58 m)
- Height: 8 ft 6 in (2.59 m)
- Wing area: 201 sq ft (18.7 m^{2})
- Powerplant: 1 × Continental IO-360-C , 210 hp (157 kW)

Performance

- Service ceiling: 12,000 ft (3,657.6 m)

== See also ==
- List of inventors killed by their own inventions

Related development

- Cessna Skymaster
- Ford Pinto

Aircraft of comparable role, configuration, and era

- Aerocar
- Aerauto PL.5C
