= Bill Otto =

Bill or William Otto may refer to:

- Bill Otto (entrepreneur), founder of Otto Laboratories and Otto Aviation Group
- Bill Otto (Kansas politician), Republican member of the Kansas House of Representatives from 2005 to 2012
- Bill Otto (Missouri politician) (born 1956), Democratic member of the Missouri House of Representatives from 2013 to 2017
- William Tod Otto (1816–1905), American judge and reporter of decisions of the United States Supreme Court
