= Hybrid aircraft =

Hybrid aircraft may refer to:

- Hybrid airship, a powered aircraft combining lighter-than-air lift and aerodynamic lift
- Hybrid electric aircraft, an aircraft with a hybrid electric powertrain
