= Airbus E-Fan X =

Type of aircraft

E-Fan X
- The E-Fan X is a BAe 146 with its starboard inboard turbofan replaced by an electric motor

General information
- Type: Hybrid electric aircraft testbed
- National origin: Multi-national
- Manufacturer: Airbus/Rolls-Royce plc/Siemens
- Status: Cancelled

History
- Developed from: British Aerospace 146

The Airbus/Rolls-Royce/Siemens E-Fan X was a hybrid electric aircraft demonstrator being developed by a partnership of Airbus, Rolls-Royce plc and Siemens. Announced on 28 November 2017, it followed previous electric flight demonstrators towards sustainable transport for the European Commission’s Flightpath 2050 Vision. A BAe 146 flying testbed was to have one of its four Lycoming ALF502 turbofans replaced by a Siemens 2 MW (2,700 hp) electric motor, adapted by Rolls-Royce and powered by its AE2100 turboshaft, controlled and integrated by Airbus with a 2 t (4,400 lb) battery. In April 2020, the programme was cancelled during the COVID-19 pandemic.

== Development ==
Announced on 28 November 2017 at the Royal Aeronautical Society in London, the E-Fan X was initially planned to fly in 2020. It follows previous electric flight demonstrators: Cri-cri, e-Genius, E-Star and the E-Fan 1.2. It will anticipate a safe, efficient, and cost-effective hybrid single-aisle airliner. Airbus and Siemens have collaborated since April 2016 on the E-Aircraft Systems House for electric propulsion components, including ground tests. It will help establish certification requirements for electric aircraft. Existing technologies cannot achieve European Commission’s Flightpath 2050 Vision for Aviation goals towards sustainable transports: a reduction of CO_{2} by 75%, NO_{x} by 90% and noise by 65%; new technologies are needed including electrification.

At the 2018 Farnborough Airshow, Greg Clark, Business and Energy Secretary, announced the UK Department for BEIS will commit a part of the £255 million invested to develop greener flight technologies. At the June 2019 Paris Air Show, Rolls-Royce announced its acquisition of Siemens' electric propulsion branch, to be completed in late 2019, employing 180 in Germany and Hungary. On 19 August 2019, the compact 2.5 MW (3,400 hp) generator was run for the first time in Trondheim, Norway, before integration with an AE2100 turboprop from a Saab 2000 feeding the battery pack and a Siemens SP260D electric motor (with a 10 kW/kg power-to-weight ratio) replacing one Honeywell LF507 engine with a Rolls-Royce AE 3007 fan, through a 3,000 volts AC/DC distribution. By November 2019, the airframe (G-WEFX) had arrived at Cranfield to be modified; first flight was then planned for 2021.

In April 2020, the programme was cancelled amid the COVID-19 pandemic.

== Design ==
A BAe 146 flying testbed was to have one of its four turbofans replaced by a 2 MW (2,700 hp) electric motor, with provisions to replace a second turbofan. Airbus will build the control architecture and integrate the systems, Rolls-Royce will adapt the Siemens motor and the fan to the existing nacelle, bring the turboshaft, generator and power electronics and Siemens the electric motor and its power electronic control unit, the inverter, DC/DC converter and power distribution. High-power propulsion systems are challenged by thermal effects, electric thrust management, altitude and dynamic effects on electric systems and electromagnetic compatibility issues.

An inboard 7,000 lbf (31 kN) Lycoming ALF502 was to be replaced with a Citation X/ERJ-145 AE3007 nacelle, but with its core replaced with the electric motor and inverter and the C-130J's AE2100 turboshaft in the rear fuselage with its air inlet behind the wing – both using the V-22 Osprey tilt-rotor's Liberty T406 core. While Rolls-Royce is experienced in industrial and naval applications, the 2.5 MW (3,400 hp) generator feeding a 3,000 V DC distribution through its AC/DC converter are firsts in aviation. Airbus supplies a 2 t (4,400 lb), 2 MW (2,700 hp) battery in the cargo holds, a 30 times step up from the E-Fan. The Siemens motor Power/Mass ratio will be higher than the 5.2 kW/kg (3.2 hp/lb) of the 2017 Paris Air Show Extra 330 demonstrator. The motor and generator are not cryogenically cooled and not superconducting for more than 15% of losses but ultimate efficiency is not a prime target.

The Rolls generator is oil-cooled with supercritical carbon dioxide as the intermediary cooling fluid, building on Rolls-Royce LibertyWorks’ power system for the Aurora XV-24A LightningStrike: a high-speed VTOL aircraft scheduled to fly in 2018 with electric distributed propulsion using Rolls’ AE1107 turboshaft (with the same AE2100 core) driving three 1 MW (1,300 hp) Honeywell generators. The nacelle outer mold line will be kept to maintain the BAe 146 airworthiness approval.

A Siemens DC/AC converter power electronics was to feed the 2 MW (2,700 hp) SP2000 liquid cooled motor, eight times more powerful than the Extra 330E's Siemens SP260D, the most powerful motor flying now with 260 kW (350 hp) for 50 kg (110 lb). The electric machines was expected to attain a 10-times-higher power-to-weight ratio. Pressurization, insulation and separation was to avoid the corona effect: high altitude, high voltage arcing. Hybrid electric can offer improvements with present Battery Technologies : using them to boost power for takeoff and climb and electric-only descent would lower fuel burn per sector by double digits, and would reduce noise and local atmospheric emissions.

== See also ==
- Airbus E-Fan
