= Spectrum SA-550 =

Twin-boom single engined aircraft

Basler Turbo 37 Spectrum SA-550
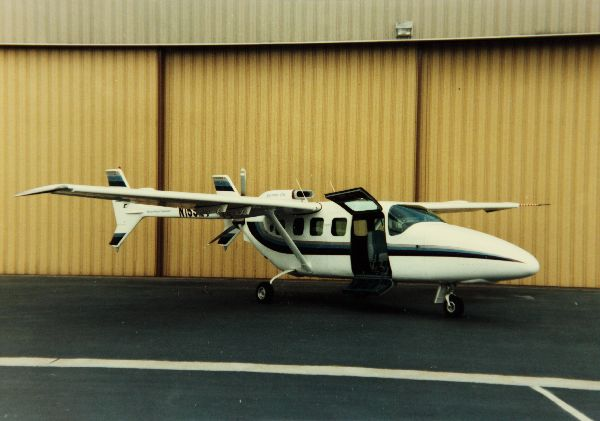

General information
- Type: STOL conversion
- National origin: United States
- Manufacturer: Basler Turbo Conversions; Spectrum Aircraft Corporation
- Status: production completed
- Number built: At least two

History
- Introduction date: 1983
- First flight: 1 February 1983
- Developed from: Cessna Skymaster

The Basler Turbo 37/Spectrum SA-550 is a twin-boom single engined aircraft converted from a Reims/Cessna FTB337G Skymaster by Basler Turbo Conversions and Spectrum Aircraft Corporation. The aircraft first flew on 1 February 1983.

== Design and development ==
The Skymaster rear engine was replaced with a flat-rated 550 hp (410 kW) Pratt & Whitney Canada PT6 and front engine was removed and the cockpit was stretched forward. The aircraft is capable of taking off in less than 450 ft (137 m) fully loaded. Basler had a deal with the government of Thailand to convert their O-2 Skymaster to SA-550 and to convert civilian Skymaster in Thailand as well. These plans appear to have never happened.

The aircraft is currently owned by Basler Turbo Conversions of Oshkosh, Wisconsin.

== Specifications (SA-550) ==
Data from Flight International

General characteristics

- Crew: one
- Capacity: ten
- Length: 36 ft 10 in (11.23 m)
- Wingspan: 38 ft 2 in (11.63 m)
- Height: 9 ft 2 in (2.79 m)
- Empty weight: 2,600 lb (1,179 kg)
- Max takeoff weight: 4,800 lb (2,177 kg)
- Fuel capacity: 125 US gallons (474 litres)
- Powerplant: 1 × Pratt & Whitney PT6A-27 , 550 shp (410 kW)

Performance

- Maximum speed: 250 mph (400 km/h, 220 kn) at 15,000 ft (4575 m)
- Cruise speed: 250 mph (400 km/h, 220 kn)
- Stall speed: 66 mph (106 km/h, 57 kn) flaps down, power off
- Range: 900 mi (1,400 km, 780 nmi) with standard fuel
- Rate of climb: 1,600 ft/min (8.1 m/s)
