= Otto Aerospace =

American aircraft manufacturer

Otto Aerospace LLC is an emerging aerospace technology company based in Fort Worth, Texas.

On September 29, 2025 Otto Aerospace announced that Flexjet is its launch customer with a firm fleet order of 300 aircraft plus options. The Wall Street Journal estimated the value at approximately $5B - although Otto and Flexjet did not release commercial terms. Deliveries are expected to begin in 2030.

At the 2025 Paris Airshow Otto CEO Paul Touw and Florida Governor Ron DeSantis announced a $515M incentive plan with Otto moving its corporate headquarters and manufacturing center to Cecil Field in Jacksonville.

The company was established as Otto Aviation in 2008 by William "Bill" Otto to develop the Celera 500L. Otto had been a research scientist at Los Alamos National Laboratory, systems engineer then chief scientist at North American Aviation. Otto Aviation has been privately funded since 2008 and is seeking a Series B fundraising round: 200 million dollars are needed for FAR Part 23 certification in three years. Construction of the airplane commenced in 2015.

In 2025 the company changed focus from the Celera 500L and is developing a midsize business jet called the Phantom 3500. This uses super-laminar flow technology, which was initially tested on the Celera.

The company is working with DARPA on a laminar flow UAV.

== See also ==
- Zunum Aero
- Eviation Alice
- Otto Celera 500L
- Otto Phantom 3500
