= Ampaire Electric EEL =

Hybrid electric aircraft

Electric EEL
- The Electric EEL is a Cessna 337 Skymaster with an electric forward motor and a battery in its belly pod

General information
- Type: hybrid electric aircraft
- National origin: United States
- Manufacturer: Ampaire
- Status: Under development

History
- Introduction date: planned for 2021
- First flight: 6 June 2019 (modified 337)
- Developed from: Cessna 337 Skymaster

The Ampaire Electric EEL is a hybrid electric aircraft developed by U.S. startup Ampaire, established in Hawthorne, California. The forward piston engine of a Cessna 337 Skymaster (a push-pull aircraft) is replaced by an electric motor powered by a battery, in a parallel hybrid configuration. The demonstrator first flew on 6 June 2019.

== Design ==
Ampaire is replacing the Cessna 337 Skymaster (a push-pull aircraft) forward piston engine with an electric motor. The forward Continental IO-360 piston engine is replaced with an electric motor powered by a battery in a parallel hybrid configuration, optimising power output to reduce operating costs and pollution. The centerline thrust makes the 337 a useful testbed, allowing thrust differences with no yawing unlike a conventional twin-engine aircraft.

Ampaire is marketing the EEL to government departments and private owners while undisclosed commercial operators already placed orders. Manufactured between 1965 and 1982, there is in-service fleet of 2,500 of the six-seat aircraft. EEL refers to the original 337 designation, with the characters reversed. Ampaire wants to offer multiple single and twin-engined aircraft, powered by its proprietary electric-propulsion system.

== Development ==
By January 2019, Ampaire planned to fly the prototype on Hawaiian Mokulele Airlines commuter routes operated with Cessna Caravans. Seven other airlines are interested by Caravan or Twin Otter conversions: Seattle's Kenmore Air, Tropic Air of Belize, Puerto Rico-based Vieques Air Link, Southern Airways Express of Memphis, Tennessee, Guernsey's Aurigny and Star Marianas Air, based in the Northern Mariana Islands, as well as Norway. Test flights will take place on a 28 miles (45 km) route over 15 minutes between Kahului Airport in Central Maui and Hana Airport on the East side. The hybrid prototype held its first public test flight on June 6, 2019, before scheduled service planned for 2021.

Later that month, Personal Airline Exchange (PAX) became the launch customer for the electric EEL modified six-seat Skymaster, to be certified in 2021, with an order for 50 plus 50 options. US start-up PAX is an on-demand per-seat charter offering point-to-point service competing with driving, is connecting small airports to bypass hubs and congested roads. PAX will acquire two Cessna 337s, sourced and refurbished by Ampaire, to start commercial operations in early 2020 in southern California before a nationwide introduction, with their original engines.

A second prototype was first flown in September 2020. With this second prototype, Hawaiian regional carrier Mokulele Airlines will experiment connecting Maui airports. It will be limited to a pilot and two non-paying passengers, below its six-seat capacity, and Mokulele will provide hangar space, parts, pilots and maintenance. A similar pilot project is supported by Vieques Air Link, a regional airline in Puerto Rico. The certification and service entry of the EEL is planned for 2021. The prototype was originally configured with the electric motor replacing the aft engine, but by October 2019 the configuration was swapped with the piston engine in the back and the electric system forward. This redesign also moved the batteries outside the cabin into a belly pod.

In 2020, Scottish regional carrier Loganair trialled the Electric EEL with 70% fuel savings for short hops and 50% for longer flights of 50-250 miles (80-400km). In August 2021, tests were conducted in the Orkney islands, including the aircraft's first flight across open water between Kirkwall and Wick. Further demonstration flights are then expected to occur between Exeter and Newquay in south west England. On 10 December 2023, Ampaire flew the Electric EEL for 12h, covering 1,195nm (2,213km) from Camarillo Airport in California, limited by remaining daylight hours and landing with 2h left of fuel and battery reserve.

== See also ==
- Eviation Alice
- VoltAero Cassio
- Wright Electric
- Zunum Aero
