= CAF Southern California Wing Museum =

American aircraft museum

- Established: 1981
- Location: Camarillo, California, United States
- Coordinates: 34.2099447°N 119.0817523°W
- Type: Air museum
- Website: cafsocal.com

The CAF Southern California Wing Museum (commonly shortened to CAF SoCal) is an air museum at Camarillo Airport in Camarillo, California. It is a unit of the Commemorative Air Force. It is home to several airworthy historic aircraft, as well as static aircraft, displays, models, and artifacts primarily related to military aviation in World War II. The unit includes a Cadet Program focused on introducing children and young adults to the aviation and aerospace sectors, and provides them scholarship opportunities for flight training.

== Collection ==
The museum's collection of foreign aircraft is the largest of any Commemorative Air Force wing. Warbird rides are sold on the PBJ Mitchell, SNJ Texans, and PT-19. As of November 2024, it is home to the following aircraft:

Aircraft type	Photo	Notes	Reg. or S/N (Note: Aircraft registration or serial number/construction number if aircraft lacks current registration.)	Airworthy
Alon A-2 Aircoupe			N5694F	Yes
Fairchild PT-19B			N50426	Yes
Fairchild F-24R-46			N77696	Yes
Grumman F6F-5 Hellcat		Named Minsi III and marked as David McCampbell's F6F Hellcat.	N1078Z	Yes
Messerschmitt Bf 108 D-1 Taifun		Only airworthy example outside of Europe with an original Argus engine.	N2231	Yes
Mitsubishi A6M3 Mod. 22 Zero			N712Z	Yes
North American PBJ-1J Mitchell		Named Semper Fi. Only surviving original PBJ-1, BuNo. 35857.	N5865V	Yes
North American SNJ-4 Texan			N6411D	Yes
North American SNJ-5 Texan			N89014	Yes
North American Navion			N91644	Yes
Supermarine Spitfire FR Mk. XIVe			N749DP	Yes
Curtiss C-46 Commando		Named China Doll. Static display.	N53594	No
Fieseler Fi 156 D Storch		In restoration to airworthiness.	N40FS	No
Grumman F8F-2 Bearcat		In restoration to airworthiness.	N7825C	No
Mikoyan-Gurevich MiG-21MF		Cockpit section only.	c/n 965306	No
North American YAT-28E Trojan		In restoration to static display.	s/n 51-3788	No
Yakovlev Yak-50		Static display.	N950DK	No

Though not part of the CAF's fleet, the hangars are also home to the following aircraft:

Aircraft type	Photo	Notes	Reg. or S/N	Airworthy
Privately owned
Aero L-39C Albatros		Named The Pink Jet, painted pink in support for breast cancer patients and awareness.	N368LA	Yes
Beechcraft T-34B Mentor			N134RR	Yes
Boeing-Stearman Model 75		Restored as a PT-13.	N68837	Yes
Bell UH-1H Iroquois			s/n 67-17792	No
High Alpha Airshows
Antonov An-2R		Named Big Panda II.	N50670	Yes
Mikoyan-Gurevich MiG-17F			N117BR	Yes

== See also ==
- List of aviation museums
