= Cessna Skymaster =

1961 utility aircraft family by Cessna

Cessna 336 Skymaster 337 Super Skymaster
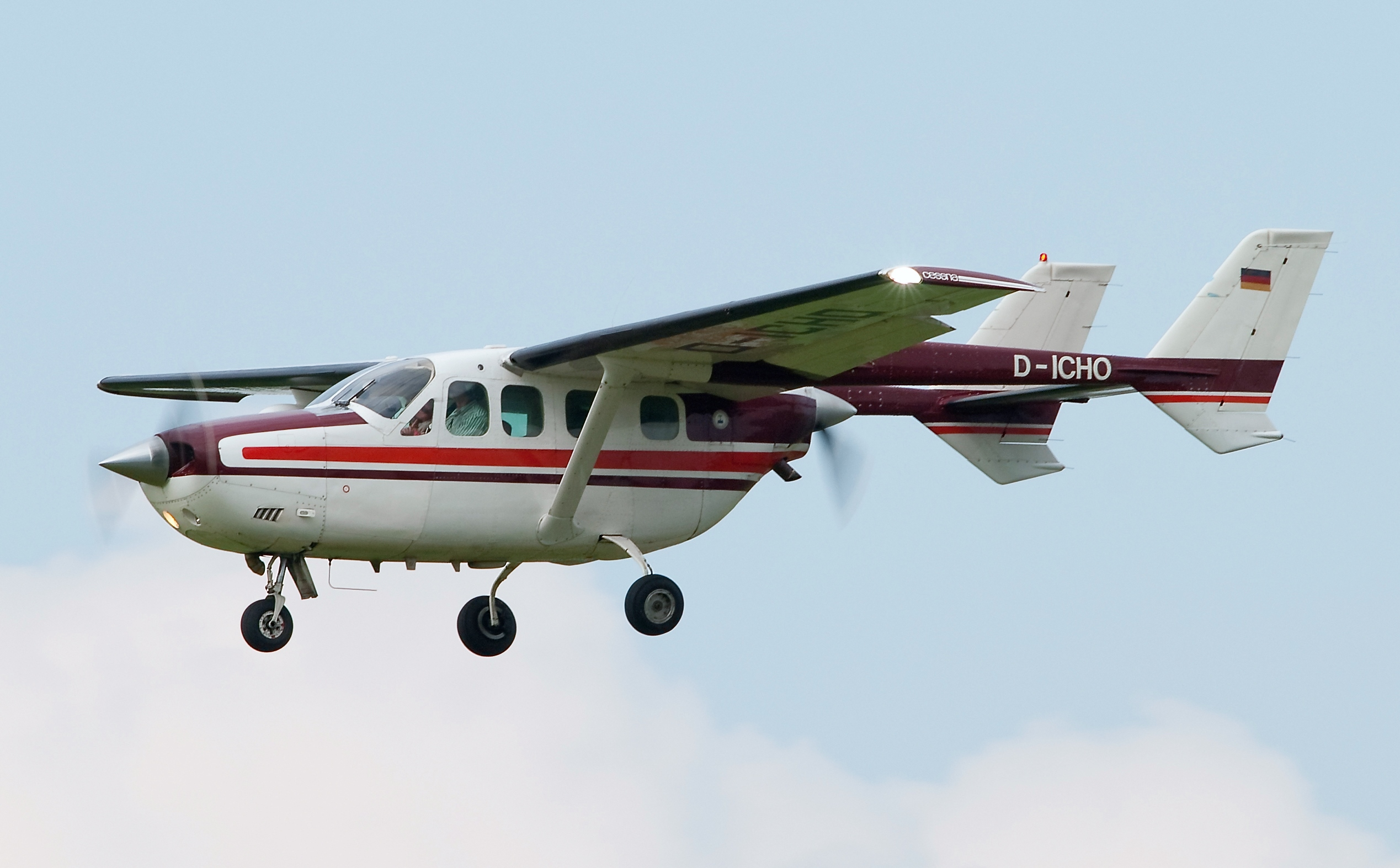
- Cessna P337G Pressurized Skymaster

General information
- Type: Personal use and air taxi aircraft
- National origin: United States
- Manufacturer: Cessna; Reims Aviation
- Number built: 2,993

History
- Manufactured: 1963–1982
- Introduction date: 1962
- First flight: February 28, 1961
- Variants: Cessna O-2 Skymaster; Conroy Stolifter; Spectrum SA-550

The Cessna Skymaster is an American twin-engine civil utility aircraft built in a push-pull configuration. Its engines are mounted in the nose and rear of its pod-style fuselage. Twin booms extend aft of the wings to the vertical stabilizers, with the rear engine between them. The horizontal stabilizer is aft of the pusher propeller, mounted between and connecting the two booms. The combined tractor and pusher engines produce centerline thrust and a unique sound. The Cessna O-2 Skymaster is a military version of the Cessna Model 337 Super Skymaster.

== Development ==
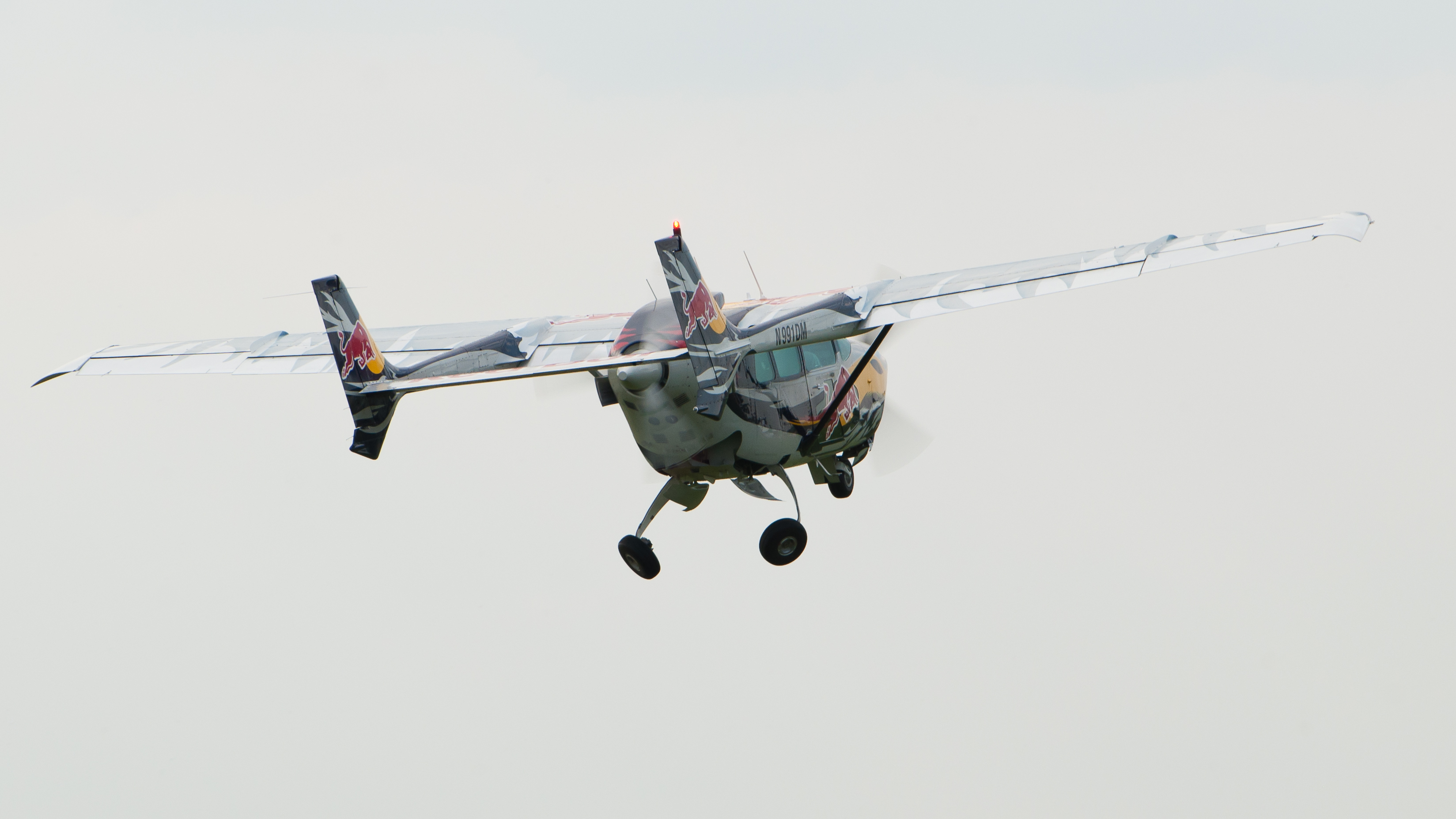
Retracting landing gear

The first Skymaster, Model 336 Skymaster, had fixed landing gear and initially flew on February 28, 1961. It went into production in May 1963 with 195 being produced through mid-1964.

In February 1965, Cessna introduced the Model 337 Super Skymaster. The model was larger, and had more powerful engines, retractable landing gear, and a dorsal air scoop for the rear engine. (The "Super" prefix was subsequently dropped from the name.) In 1966, the turbocharged T337 was introduced, and in 1973, the pressurized P337G entered production.

Cessna built 2993 Skymasters of all variants, including 513 military O-2 versions. Production in America ended in 1982, but was continued by Reims in France, with the FTB337 STOL and the military FTMA Milirole.

== Design ==
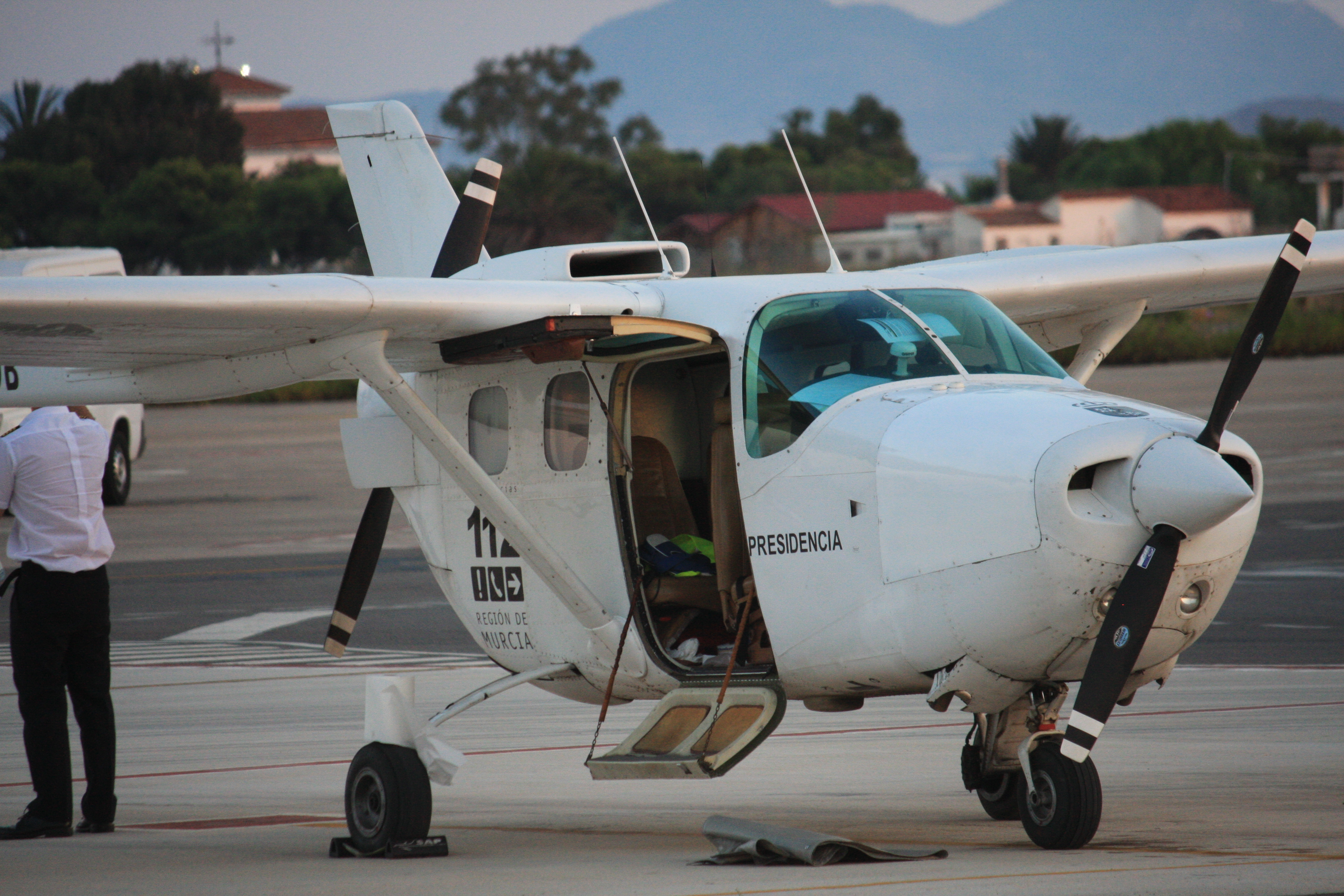
Fuselage close-up with door open

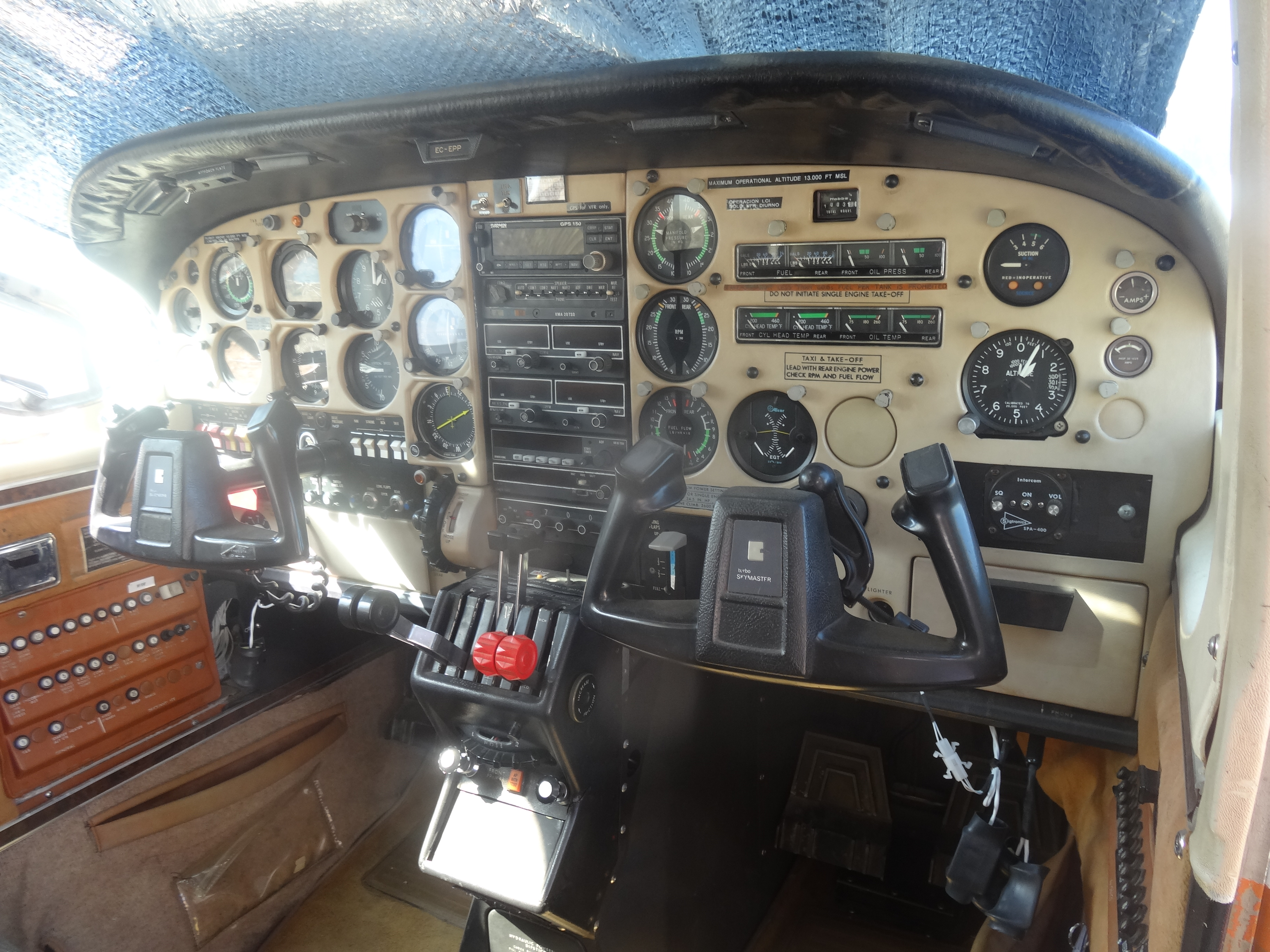
Flight deck

The Skymaster handles differently from a conventional twin-engine aircraft, primarily in that if an engine fails, the plane will not yaw toward that engine. Without the issue of differential thrust inherent to conventional (engine-on-wing) twins, engine failure on takeoff will not produce yaw from the runway heading. With no one-engine-out minimum controllable speed (Vmc), in-flight control at any flying speed with an engine inoperative is not as critical as it is with engines on the wing with the associated leverage; however, performance in speed and, particularly, rate of climb are affected. Flying a Skymaster requires a pilot to hold a multiengine rating, although many countries issue a special "centerline thrust rating" for the Skymaster and other similarly configured aircraft.

Ground handling requires certain attention and procedures. The rear engine tends to overheat and can quit while taxiing on very hot days. Accidents have occurred when the runway is shorter than the single-engine take-off roll and pilots, unaware of a rear engine shutdown, have attempted take-off on the nose engine alone. Federal Aviation Administration Airworthiness Directive 77-08-05 prohibits single-engine take-offs and requires the installation of a placard marked "Do not initiate single engine takeoff".

The Skymaster's unique sound is made by its rear pusher propeller slicing through turbulent air from the front propeller and over the airframe while its front tractor propeller addresses undisturbed air.

== Operational history ==
From 1976 until the middle 1990s, the California Department of Forestry and Fire Protection used O-2 variants of the 337 Skymaster as tactical aircraft during firefighting operations. These were replaced with North American OV-10 Broncos, starting in 1993.

During the Rhodesian Bush War, the Reims-Cessna FTB 337G 'Lynx' was the main light attack aircraft used by Rhodesian Security Forces during Fire Force counterinsurgency air assault missions, which began in 1974. The Lynxes were armed with twin Browning .303 machine guns mounted above the wing and 37mm SNEB rockets, locally made Mini "Alpha" Bombs (cluster bombs), Mini "Golf" Bombs (450 lb (200 kg) blast and shrapnel bomb) and Frantan (a napalm variant carried in frangible drop tanks) bombs.

=== Brothers to the Rescue ===
From 1991 until 2001 the Cuban exile group Hermanos al Rescate (Brothers to the Rescue) used Skymasters, among other aircraft, to fly search and rescue missions over the Florida Straits looking for rafters attempting to cross the straits to defect from Cuba, and when they found them, dropped life-saving supplies to them. Rescues were coordinated with the US Coast Guard, which worked closely with the group. They chose Skymasters because their high wing offered better visibility of the waters below, they were reliable and easy to fly for long-duration missions (averaging 7 hours), and they added a margin of safety with twin-engine centerline thrust. In 1996, two of the Brothers to the Rescue Skymasters were shot down by the Cuban Air Force over international waters. Both aircraft were downed by a MiG-29, while a second jet fighter, a MiG-23, orbited nearby.

== Variants ==
Cessna has historically used model years similar to U.S. auto manufacturers, with sales of new models typically starting a few months prior to the actual calendar year.

336 Skymaster
Original variant first flown in 1961 and introduced for the 1963 and 1964 model years. The 336 had a six-seat cabin and was powered by two 195 hp (145 kW) Continental IO-360-A engines. Production aircraft differed from the prototypes in that they had a roomier cabin and a redesigned rear engine cowling to improve engine cooling and reduce cabin noise. Gross weight was 3,900 lb (1,800 kg). A total of 197 built; 2 prototypes and 195 production aircraft (102 in 1963 and 93 in 1964).

337 Super Skymaster
The 1965 model year brought major changes to the Skymaster, which led to a new model number, 337, being assigned. The most significant change was the addition of retractable undercarriage similar to that of the Cessna 210 Centurion, which sat four inches lower than the 336 for ease of entry/exit. Other changes included a redesigned nose cowling and new rear engine intake, greater wing angle of incidence, shortened ventral tail fins, increased elevator chord, and an increased gross weight of 4,200 lb (1,900 kg). The 337 was powered by two 210 hp (160 kW) Continental IO-360-C or IO-360-D engines. 239 total built; 1 prototype and 238 production aircraft.

337A Super Skymaster
1966 model year with canted engine instruments and rotary-type door latches. 284 built. 31 were later modified to MC337A standard with loudspeakers and leaflet dispensers for use by the United States Air Force as the O-2B Skymaster.

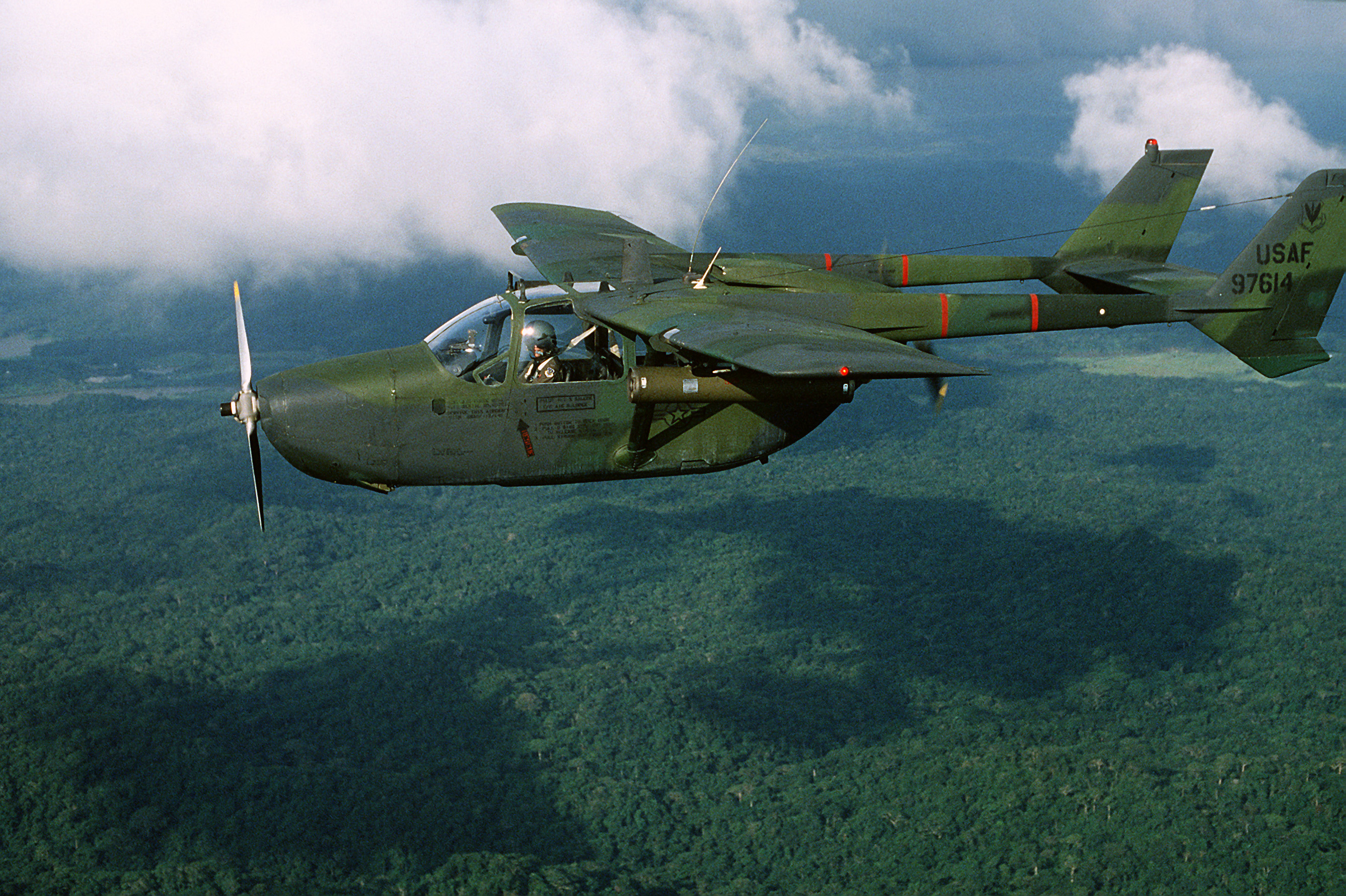
USAF O-2A (M337B) over Panama

337B/T337B Super Skymaster
1967 model year with improved brakes, 38A alternators, a redesigned cabin heating system, a split-bus electrical system, and an increased gross weight of 4,300 lb (2,000 kg). A version powered by turbocharged 210 hp (160 kW) Continental TSIO-360-A engines was also offered as the T337B. 231 built, plus 479 M337B military variants as the O-2A Skymaster.

337C/T337C Super Skymaster
1968 model year with a new instrument panel, improved seat belts, and an increased gross weight of 4,400 lb (2,000 kg) (4,500 lb (2,000 kg) for the T337C). 223 built.

337D/T337D Super Skymaster
1969 model year with reduced elevator chord and increased elevator up travel, electroluminescent instrument panel lighting, and new cowl flap controls. Also offered as the turbocharged T337D. 215 built.

337E/T337E Super Skymaster
1970 model year with conical cambered wingtips, a new fuel quantity system, and an increased gross weight of 4,440 lb (2,010 kg) (4,630 lb (2,100 kg) for the T337E). 123 built, plus 24 in France by Reims Aviation for the European market as the F337E.

FTA337E
One aircraft converted from the 20th production F337E.

337F/T337F Super Skymaster
Introduced for the 1971 model year with an increased gross weight of 4,630 lb (2,100 kg) (same as the T337F) a refined instrument panel, a padded glareshield, a front engine access panel, and other minor changes. The 1972 model year introduced nose-mounted landing/taxi lights and minor interior changes. The turbocharged T337F was only offered for the 1971 model year. 147 total built; 83 (1971) and 64 (1972). Reims also built a total of 31 as the F337F; 21 (1971) and 10 (1972).

337G Super Skymaster
Introduced for the 1973 model year with a recontoured nose cap, flush wingtip lights, low-drag front exhaust stack and wing strut fairings, a flush-mounted pitot port on the left wing strut, a split airstair door replacing the cabin and baggage doors, aileron gap seals, and a hydraulic powerpack replacing the engine-driven pump. Power was provided by two 210 hp (160 kW) Continental IO-360-G engines. The 1974 model year introduced recessed parking brake control, a hydraulic gear accumulator, and improved subpanel rocker switches. 1975 introduced an optional 148 US gal (560 L) auxiliary fuel system and the Skymaster II with a preferred options package. 1976 introduced a "Camber-Lift" wing, a redesigned instrument panel, and a reworked fuel system with tail boom fuel sump tanks removed. 1977 introduced a new front propeller airfoil and an auxiliary master power switch. A turbocharged version of the unpressurized 337G was not offered. 354 total built; 88 (1973), 56 (1974), 65 (1975), 77 (1976), and 68 (1977). Reims also built a total of 29 as the F337G; 8 (1973), 8 (1974), 5 (1975), 3 (1976), and 5 (1977).

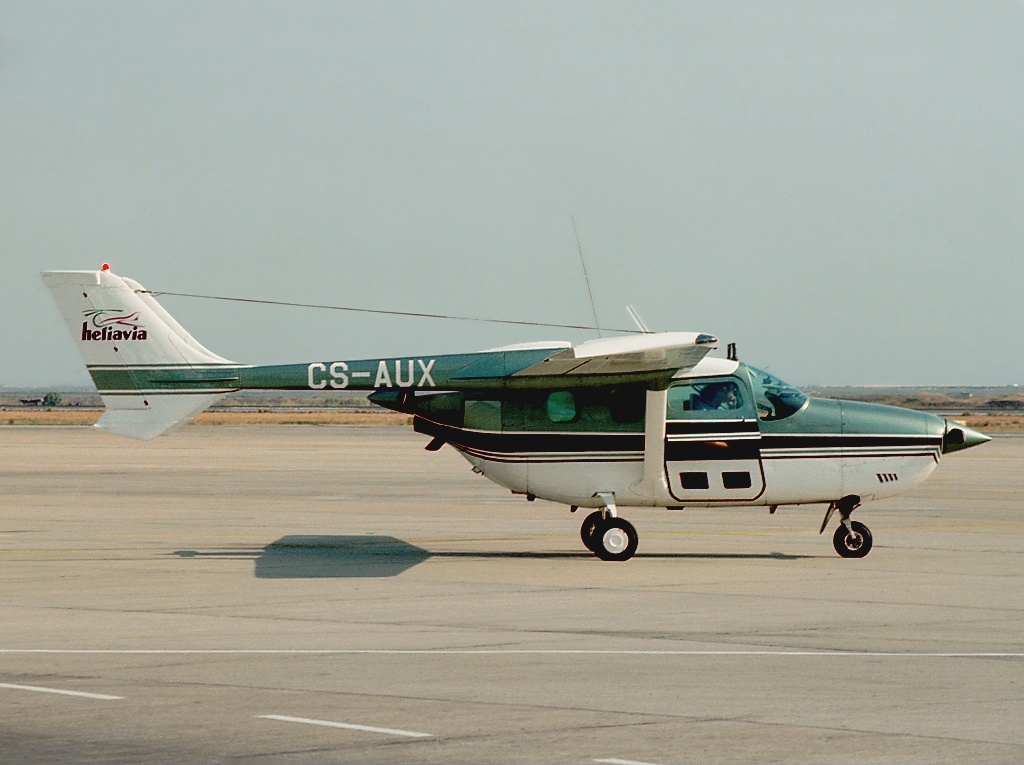
Reims FT337GP Pressurized Skymaster

P337G Pressurized Skymaster
Also known as the T337G, (Note: These aircraft were referred to as "T337G" on the Federal Aviation Administration type certificate, but were given "P337" construction numbers by Cessna.) introduced for the 1973 model year as a turbocharged, pressurized version of the 337G. The P337G was powered by two 225 hp (168 kW) TSIO-360-C engines. Like the 337G, the Skymaster II option was also available for the P337G. 292 total built; 1 (1971 prototype), 148 (1973), 45 (1974), 31 (1975), 32 (1976), and 35 (1977). Reims also built a total of 22 as the FT337GP; 8 (1973), 5 (1974), 2 (1975), 2 (1976), and 5 (1977).

FTB337G
Military variant of the F337G with Sierra Industries Robertson STOL modifications and underwing hardpoints. Known as the Lynx in Rhodesian Air Force service. 61 built.

337H/T337H Skymaster
Introduced for the 1978 model year with redesigned control wheels and minor interior refinements. The turbocharged version was also offered after a six year absence as the T337H, which was powered by two 210 hp (160 kW) Continental TSIO-360-H engines. The T337H-SP was introduced for the 1980 model year and was powered by TSIO-360-JB engines. The 1980 model year replaced the engines of the 337H and T337H with the TSIO-360-GB and TSIO-360-HB, respectively. 140 total built; 58 (1978), 47 (1979 337H/T337H), 1 (1979 T337H-SP prototype), 24 (1980 337H/T337H), and 10 (1980 T337H-SP). Reims also built 2 aircraft in 1978 as the F337H.

P337H Pressurized Skymaster
Introduced for the 1978 model year as a turbocharged, pressurized version of the 337H powered by two 225 hp (168 kW) TSIO-360-C engines, which were replaced by the TSIO-360-C for the 1980 model year. 64 total built; 26 (1978), 24 (1979), and 15 (1980). Reims also built 1 aircraft in 1978 as the FT337HP.

348
Based on the M337B but with two 317 shp (236 kW) Allison 250-B15 turboprop engines, a longer span wing, and improved high lift devices. Designated O-2T, only a single prototype was built.

351
Also known as the O-2TT, a proposed variant of the O-2T with a tandem two-seat cockpit for the pilot and observer. Only a mockup was built.

377/327 Baby Skymaster
Reduced-scale four-seat version of the 337 first proposed in 1965 as the Model 377 with cantilever wings replacing the 336/337 strut-braced configuration. The 377 was later redesignated as the Model 327 in 1967 and was first flown in December of that year. One prototype was built before the project was canceled in 1968 due to lack of commercial interest in the design. The prototype was delivered to NASA to serve as a full-scale model for wind tunnel testing. It was used in a joint Langley Research Center and Cessna project on noise reduction and the use of ducted versus free propellers.

B.TCh.1
(Thai: บ.ตช.๑) Royal Thai Armed Forces designation for the P337G and T337H-SP.

=== Conversions/modifications ===
Ampaire Electric EEL
Hybrid electric aircraft with the forward piston engine replaced by an electric motor powered by a battery, in a parallel hybrid configuration. The demonstrator first flew on 6 June 2019, before Hawaiian regional carrier Mokulele Airlines experiment connecting Maui airports with the aircraft.
AVE Mizar
Flying car, created by Advanced Vehicle Engineers, was an attachment of Skymaster wings, tail, and rear engine to a Ford Pinto outfitted with aircraft controls and instruments.
Conroy Stolifter
An extensive single-turboprop engine STOL cargo plane conversion of the Skymaster. Front engine was replaced with a Garrett AiResearch TPE-331 turboprop; rear engine was removed, and its space filled with an extended cargo pod.
Groen RevCon 6-X
Test conversion of a Cessna 337 Skymaster airplane. This aircraft conversion tested the theory of using fixed-wing airplanes as the basic airframes for gyroplanes to reduce cost and shorten development time.
Spectrum SA-550
Built by Spectrum Aircraft Corporation of Van Nuys, California, it was an extensive single-turboprop engine conversion of a Reims FTB337G constructed in the mid 1980s. They removed the nose engine, lengthened the nose, and replaced the rear engine with a turboprop.
Summit Sentry O2-337
Summit Aviation of Middletown, Delaware re-manufactured existing used 337 airframes into the militarized O2-337 which includes four wing-mounted NATO standard pylons capable of carrying 350 lb (159 kg) each for 7.62 mm and 12.7 mm gun pods, rocket launchers, bombs, markers and flares. The aircraft was marketed for the target identification and marking, reconnaissance, helicopter escort and aerial photography roles. Examples were sold to the Haitian Air Force, Honduras, Nicaragua, Senegal and the Thai Navy. The variant was still in production in 1987.
VoltAero hybrid electric conversion
VoltAero is a startup company formed in September 2017 by the CTO and test pilot of the 2014 Airbus E-Fan 1.0. The company has been established in Royan, with support from the French Nouvelle-Aquitaine region. It is developing a hybrid electric aircraft testbed based on the Skymaster, which is intended to fly in late February 2019. It will be followed up by the VoltAero Cassio prototype in 2020, a clean-sheet, all-composite design.

== Military operators ==
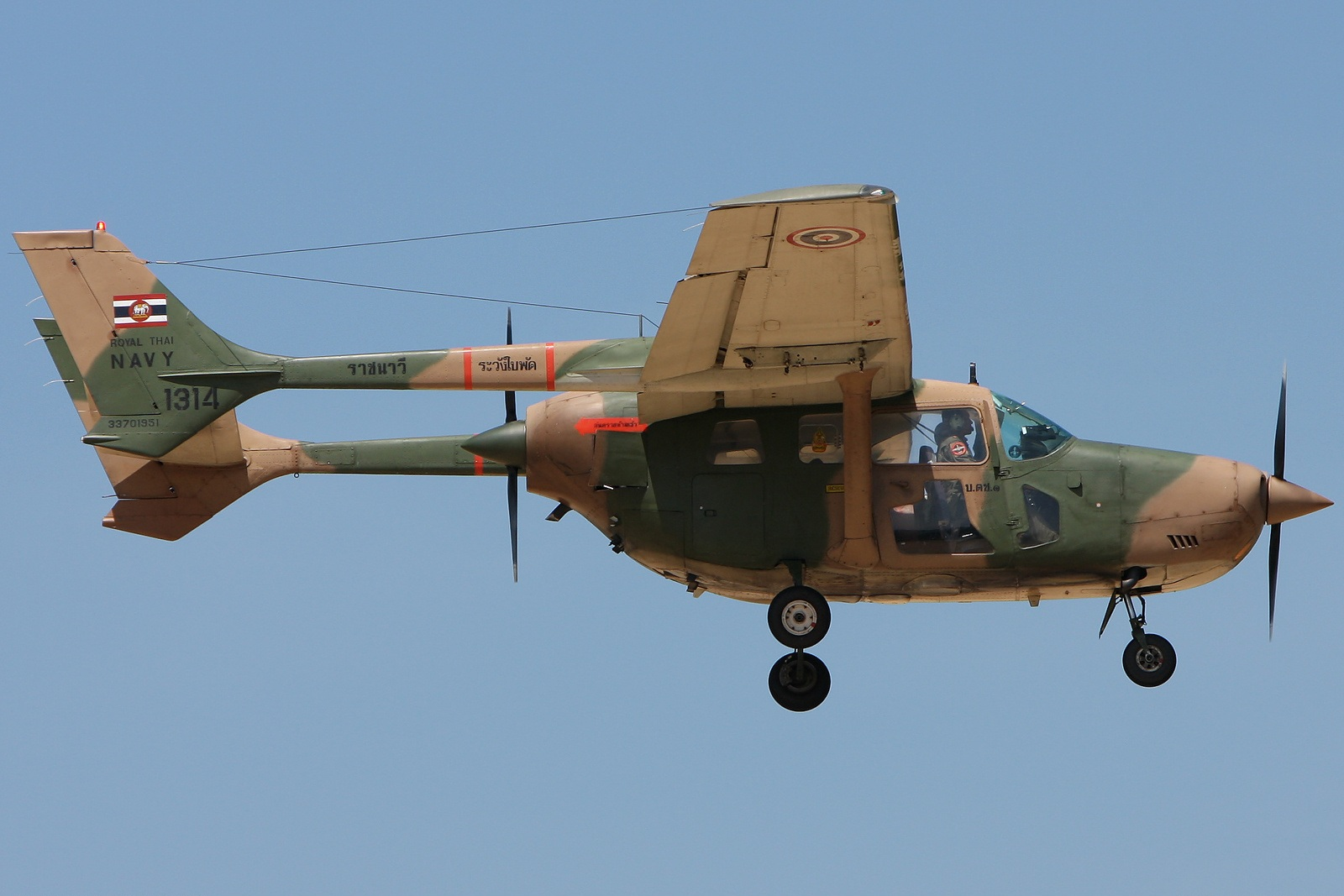
Thai Navy T337H-SP

Angola
FAPA/DAA
Burkina Faso
Force Aérienne du Burkina Faso
Colombia
Colombian Air Force
Mozambique
Força Aérea de Moçambique (3 x FTB-337G) - ex-Portuguese Air Force FTB-337G refurbished and offered by the Government of Portugal to Mozambique in 2011 and 2012.
Namibia
Namibian Air Force
Nicaragua
Nicaraguan Air Force
Thailand
Thai Navy
Togo
Togo Air Force
Zimbabwe
Air Force of Zimbabwe

=== Former military operators ===
Argentina
Gendarmeria Nacional Argentina Two examples, 1965-1986
Bangladesh
Bangladesh Air Force
Chile
Chilean Army Three examples, between the end of 1970s and mid-1990s, sold to civilian interests.
Chad
Chadian Air Force
Ecuador
Ecuadorian Air Force
El Salvador
Salvadoran Air Force
Equatorial Guinea
Armed Forces of Equatorial Guinea
Guinea-Bissau
Força Aérea de Guine-Bissau
Haiti
Haitian Air Force
Jamaica
Jamaica Defense Force
Niger
Military of Niger
Mexico
Mexican Air Force
Portugal
Portuguese Air Force (32 × FTB-337G): Purchased in 1973 to replace the force's aging Dornier Do 27 fleet, which had been used intensively in the Portuguese Colonial War. The first 337 deliveries did not arrive until December 1974—after the end of the war. The last Skymaster in service with the Portuguese Air Force was retired on July 25, 2007.
Rhodesia
Rhodesian Air Force
Senegal
Senegalese Air Force
Sri Lanka
Sri Lanka Air Force

== Specifications (337D) ==
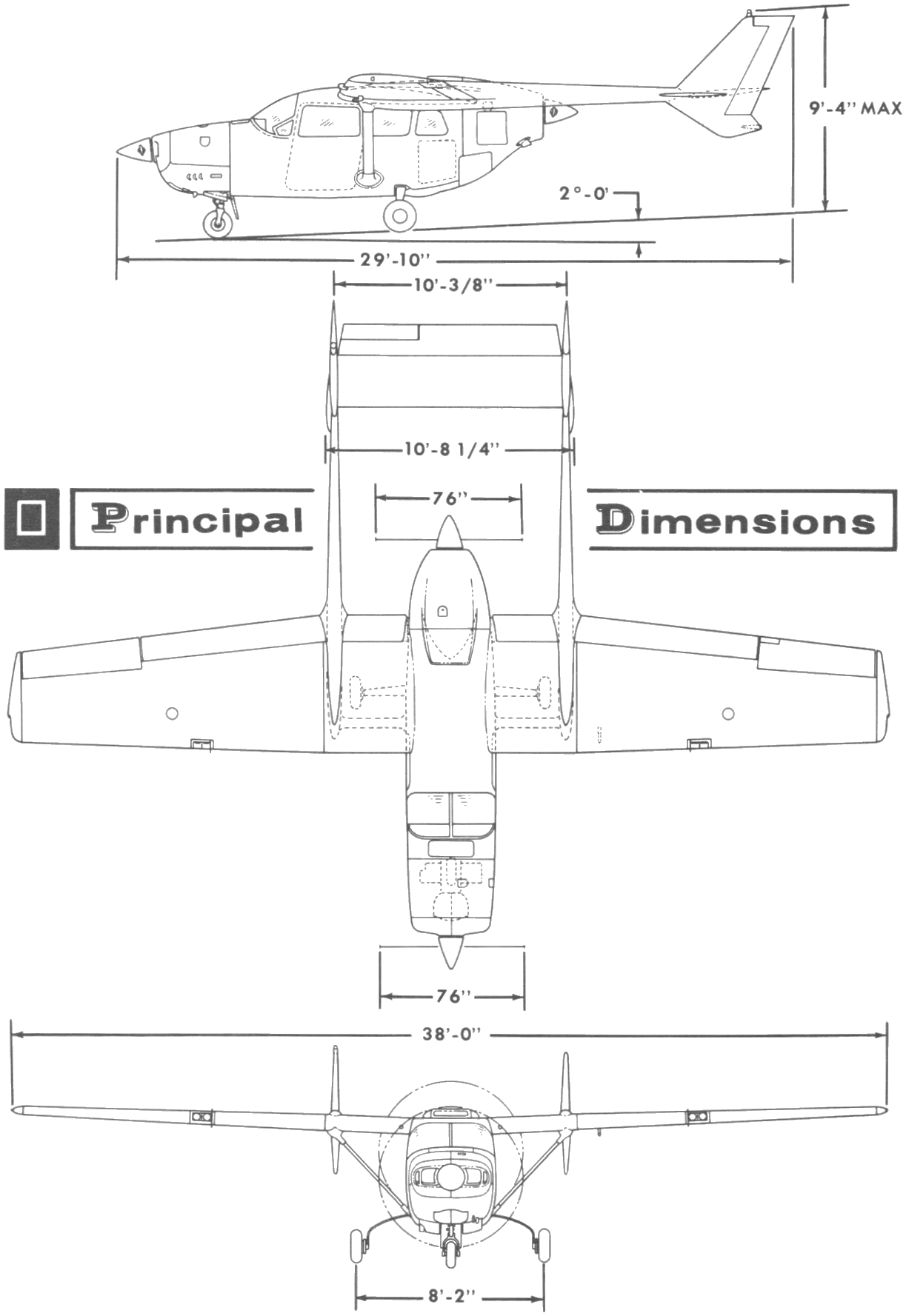
3-view line drawing of the Cessna T337C Turbo System Super Skymaster

Data from Jane's All The World's Aircraft 1969–70

General characteristics

- Crew: 1
- Capacity: 5 passengers
- Length: 29 ft 9 in (9.07 m)
- Wingspan: 38 ft 09 in (11.81 m)
- Height: 9 ft 4 in (2.84 m)
- Wing area: 201 sq ft (18.7 m^{2})
- Aspect ratio: 7.18:1
- Airfoil: NACA 2412 at root, NACA 2409 at tip
- Empty weight: 2,655 lb (1,204 kg)
- Max takeoff weight: 4,400 lb (1,996 kg)
- Fuel capacity: 92 US gal (77 imp gal; 350 L) normal, 128 US gal (107 imp gal; 480 L) with auxiliary tanks
- Powerplant: 2 × Continental IO-360-C air-cooled flat-six piston engine, 210 hp (160 kW) each
- Propellers: 2-bladed McCauley fully-feathering, constant-speed propeller, 6 ft 4 in (1.93 m) diameter

Performance

- Maximum speed: 199 mph (320 km/h, 173 kn) at sea level
- Cruise speed: 144 mph (232 km/h, 125 kn) at 10,000 ft (3,000 m) (econ cruise)
- Stall speed: 69 mph (111 km/h, 60 kn) (flaps and undercarriage down)
- Range: 965 mi (1,553 km, 839 nmi) (econ cruise, normal fuel)
- Service ceiling: 19,500 ft (5,900 m)
- Rate of climb: 1,200 ft/min (6.1 m/s)
- Takeoff distance to 50 ft (15m): 1,545 ft (471 m)
- Landing distance from 50 ft (15m): 1,650 ft (500 m)

== See also ==
Related development

- AVE Mizar
- O-2 Skymaster

Aircraft of comparable role, configuration, and era

- Adam A500
