= Ampaire =

Electric aircraft developer

- Industry: Aerospace manufacturer
- Founded: 2017
- Headquarters: Hawthorne, California, United States
- Key people: Kevin Noertker (co-founder and chief executive)
- Products: Electric aircraft
- Website: www.ampaire.com

Ampaire is an American aircraft manufacturer startup based in Hawthorne, California.

== History ==
The company developed the Electric EEL, based on a Cessna 337 Skymaster (a push-pull aircraft) with a piston engine replaced by an electric motor powered by a battery, in a parallel hybrid configuration. The demonstrator first flew on 6 June 2019.

In 2020, Scottish regional carrier Loganair trialled the Electric EEL with 70% fuel savings for short hops and 50% for longer flights of 50-250 miles (80-400 km). In February 2021, online booking platform Surf Air Mobility attempted to acquire Ampaire, but this was abandoned by April 2022. By then, ground tests of its Eco Caravan, a hybrid-electric Grand Caravan, were under way, towards a first flight in the second half of 2022 and service entry in 2024, as a retrofit with a STC.

The parallel hybrid architecture does not require recharging after each flight, to avoid being dependent on charging infrastructure. Ampaire is considering for 2025 or 2026 a 19-passenger Eco Otter SX based on the De Havilland Canada DHC-6 Twin Otter with four motors instead of two turboprops. Ampaire next step would be a Dash 8 or ATR type, and ultimately a clean-sheet Tailwind with a propulsive ducted fan for boundary-layer ingestion.

On 18 November 2022, Ampaire flew its Eco-Caravan maiden flight: the hybrid electric aircraft uses a RED A03 diesel engine to reduce fuel consumption by 70% on shorter trips to 50% on longer ones, retaining the Grand Caravan payload capabilities with range improved to 1,100 nmi (2,000 km); supplemental type certificate (STC) is targeted for 2024.

The smaller 270 kW (360 hp) AMP-H270 powertrain uses a DeltaHawk DH180 diesel engine, providing a 45% cruise efficiency gain over a conventional combustion engine and double the efficiency of comparable gas turbines.
