= VoltAir =

Subsidiary of Airbus

VoltAir is a wholly owned subsidiary of Airbus which is developing a proposed electrically powered airliner that was publicly announced in 2011. The preliminary concept drawings released at that time showed a low unswept wing on a conventional small-diameter fuselage. A large duct at the fuselage's rear contains two counter-rotating propellers, which would be driven by two large electric motors. Power would be supplied by a lithium-air battery pack mounted in a detachable pod on the lower fuselage nose, where it could be removed and replaced as part of the normal airport turnaround process in passenger-carriage service.

Lithium-air batteries rely on oxidation of lithium to produce their current flow. The technology holds the potential of providing much greater energy density than lithium-ion batteries.

As part of the development process, a smaller prototype called the Airbus E-Fan was built and flown in 2014. The first flight was from the company's facility in Bordeaux, France. The E-Fan is a composite, tandem two-seat low-wing aircraft. Two ducted fans are mounted on either side of its aft fuselage; each fan is driven by an electric motor of 30 kW maximum output. The batteries are lithium-ion type, sized to provide about 30 minutes of flight time.
