= Otto Celera 500L =

American experimental technology demonstrator

Celera 500L
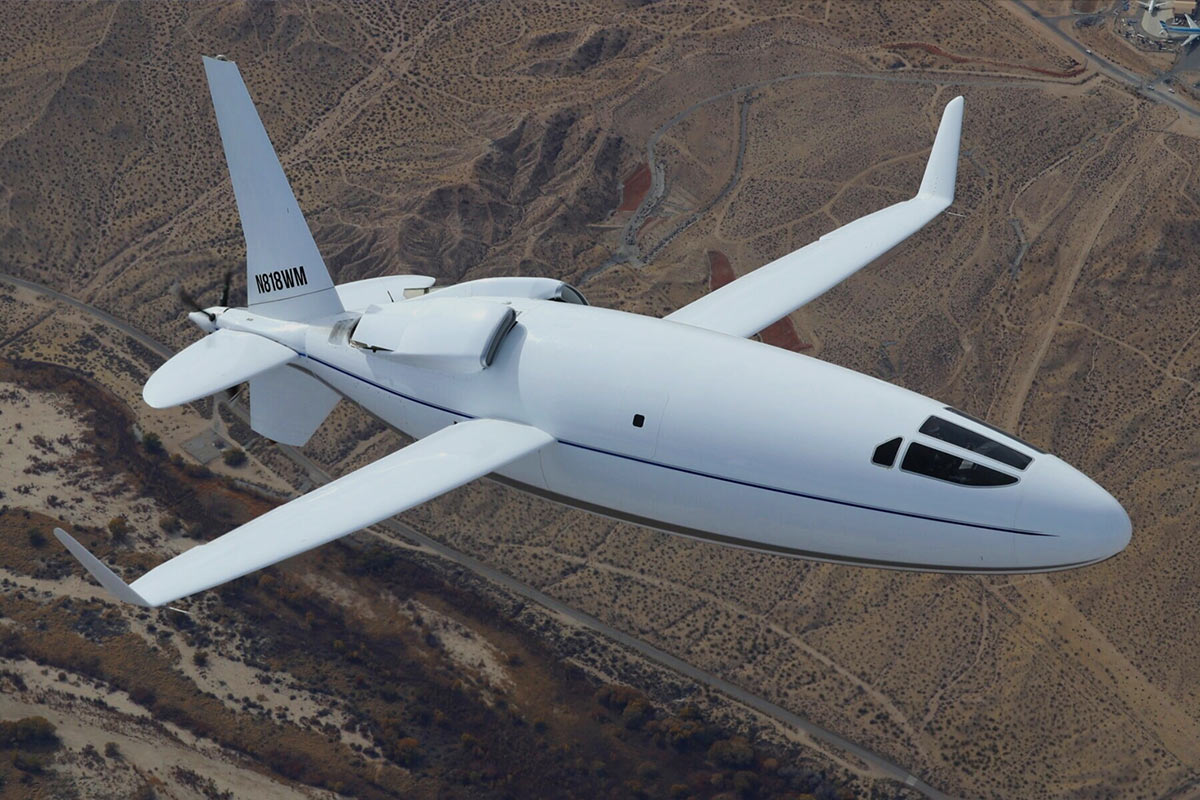
- Aircraft illustration for Otto's U.S. patent 9,669,939; the prototype has a similar configuration, with air intake scoops on the upper rear fuselage and canted winglets, but without cabin windows.

General information
- Other name: Celera 500
- Type: Experimental technology demonstrator
- National origin: United States
- Manufacturer: Otto Aerospace
- Status: Retired
- Number built: 1
- Registration: N818WM
- Flights: More than 50
- Total hours: More than 100

History
- First flight: January 2018

The Otto Celera 500L, later referred to as the Celera 500, is an American experimental technology demonstrator developed by Otto Aerospace, formerly Otto Aviation. Powered by a single RED A03 diesel piston engine in a pusher configuration, it was developed to demonstrate extensive laminar flow and accumulated more than 100 flight hours before being retired. The aircraft was originally proposed as a six-passenger business and utility aircraft. Its name is derived from the Latin adjective celer, meaning "swift" or "quick".

== History ==
Otto Aviation Group, LLC was incorporated in 2008 by William "Bill" Otto to develop the Celera 500L. The company was renamed Otto Aerospace in 2025. Otto had previously worked as a research scientist at Los Alamos National Laboratory and later at North American Aviation, where he worked on missile-guidance, aircraft-navigation and torpedo projects.

The project was initially self-funded and had been privately funded since 2008. In 2020, Otto Aviation began seeking Series B financing and estimated that it would require approximately $200 million to obtain FAR Part 23 certification, which it expected to take three years. Construction of the prototype began in 2015.

The aerodynamic prototype made its maiden flight in January 2018 and began performance testing in September 2019. Otto publicly announced the aircraft and its development program in August 2020 and noted that 31 test flights had been flown to date. By then, a weight-optimized, production-conforming prototype with cabin windows and longer landing gear was expected to fly within 18 months. At the time, the company targeted FAA certification and initial deliveries during 2023–2025. By March 2021, the prototype had accumulated more than 35 flight hours. Testing had been interrupted by the COVID-19 pandemic, and Otto expected it to resume in the third quarter of 2021. The company also planned four additional certification articles: two flight-test aircraft, one structural-test article and one systems-integration article.

By October 2021, the company had raised more than $50 million. Otto projected that the prototype would achieve a cruise fuel economy of 30 mpg_{‑US} (7.8 L/100 km) and planned to replace its external radiator nacelles with integrated heat exchangers. The company also planned to add a second turbocharger for operation up to 38,000 ft (12,000 m) and a three-stage turbocharging system for operation up to 50,000 ft (15,000 m).

In June 2022, Otto and ZeroAvia announced a collaboration to integrate ZeroAvia's ZA600 hydrogen-electric powertrain into the Celera design, potentially offering it on planned production aircraft. The Celera demonstrator was later retired, and in 2025 Otto described the Phantom 3500 as its production-ready, jet-powered successor.

== Design ==
The 500L is a mid-wing monoplane with a single five-bladed propeller in a pusher configuration. The aircraft was designed to maintain extensive laminar flow over its wings, fuselage and empennage.

Otto Aviation intended the proposed production aircraft to compete with light business aircraft such as the Cessna Citation CJ3+ and Beechcraft King Air 350. The company projected an operating cost of $328 per flight hour. The proposed cabin was to accommodate six passengers in club seating, have a height of about 6 ft 2 in (1.88 m), and include a lavatory. Otto expected the aircraft to sell for $4.5–$5 million, roughly comparable to the Honda HA-420 HondaJet, while claiming an operating cost about one-third as high.

In 2020, Aviation Week reported that the proposed production aircraft would use two-stage turbocharging to cruise at 40,000–50,000 ft (12,000–15,000 m), where full laminar flow could be achieved for an estimated 59% lower drag than competing aircraft. In 2021, Air & Space reported that adding a second turbocharger would permit flight at up to 38,000 ft (12,000 m), while three-stage turbocharging would be required to reach 50,000 ft (15,000 m). Otto projected a cruise speed of more than 400 kn (740 km/h). Because contamination could disrupt laminar flow, the company planned to certify the aircraft's performance under fully turbulent flow conditions, thereby guaranteeing a range of less than 4,500 nmi (8,300 km). The proposed production aircraft was to use a 550 hp (410 kW) RED A03-005 twin-turbocharged, liquid-cooled V12 diesel piston engine. Its two six-cylinder banks were designed to operate independently to provide redundancy. Otto targeted a 3,500–4,000 ft (1,100–1,200 m) balanced field takeoff distance and fuel economy of 16–22 nmi/US gal of Jet A. The flight controls were mechanically linked. The proposed production aircraft was to be equipped with instrument flight rules avionics for single-pilot operations.

=== Independent analysis ===
Aviation writer Peter Garrison analyzed an earlier claim that the aircraft could cruise at 400 kn (740 km/h) at 65,000 ft (20,000 m). With a fuselage 35 ft (11 m) long and a wingspan of 55 ft (17 m), he calculated that the claimed 22-to-1 glide ratio would correspond to a 3.5 sq ft (0.33 m^{2}) equivalent flat-plate area drag. Using 500 hp (370 kW), Garrison estimated theoretical top speeds of 300 kn (560 km/h) at 30,000 ft (9,100 m) and 430 kn (800 km/h) true airspeed at 65,000 ft (20,000 m), but noted that the RED A03 critical altitude was 25,000 ft (7,600 m). He also noted that the propeller tips would experience transonic wave drag and operate in a disturbed wake, limiting propeller efficiency, and that laminar flow would be difficult to maintain over much of the fuselage because of its windows and panel seams.

The Royal Aeronautical Society compared the configuration to the 1948 Planet Satellite and the 2011 EADS VoltAir electric aircraft concept. Its analysis stated that the claimed 59% drag reduction "would be quite a hard task to achieve", while lift-induced drag would not be reduced by laminar flow. It considered a 22:1 glide ratio like those of current airliners achievable through the aircraft's high wing aspect ratio, without a sensational drag reduction — better than other general aviation designs, but lower than most gliders. It also considered the 460 mph (400 kn; 740 km/h) maximum speed achievable, but stated that the cruise speed would have to be lower to reach the 4,500 nmi (8,300 km) range. The analysis found the fuel efficiency difficult to compare because no payload, cruise speed or altitude was specified. It also noted that pushing laminar flow to the limit could hinder handling qualities or structural efficiency, and that laminar flow tends to be unreliable in service because it is highly susceptible to degradation from surface irregularities.

== Specifications (proposed production aircraft) ==
The following specifications were projected by Otto Aviation for the proposed production aircraft.

Data from Otto Aviation

General characteristics

- Capacity: 6 passengers
- Cabin height: 6 ft 2 in (1.88 m)
- Cabin volume: 448 ft^{3} (12.7 m^{3})
- Powerplant: 1 × RED A03-005 twin-turbocharged liquid-cooled V12 diesel piston engine, 550 hp (410 kW) projected takeoff power
- Propellers: 5-bladed

Performance

- Cruise speed: 400 kn (460 mph, 740 km/h) projected
- Range: 4,500 nmi (5,200 mi, 8,300 km) projected
- Service ceiling: 50,000 ft (15,000 m) projected
- Maximum glide ratio: 22:1
- Fuel economy: 18–25 mpg_{‑US} (13.1–9.4 L/100 km)

== See also ==
Aircraft of comparable role, configuration, and era

- AASI Jetcruzer
- Beechcraft Starship
- Grob GF 200
- LearAvia Lear Fan
- OMAC Laser 300
- Piaggio P.180 Avanti
