= Airbus E-Fan =

Type of electric aircraft

E-Fan
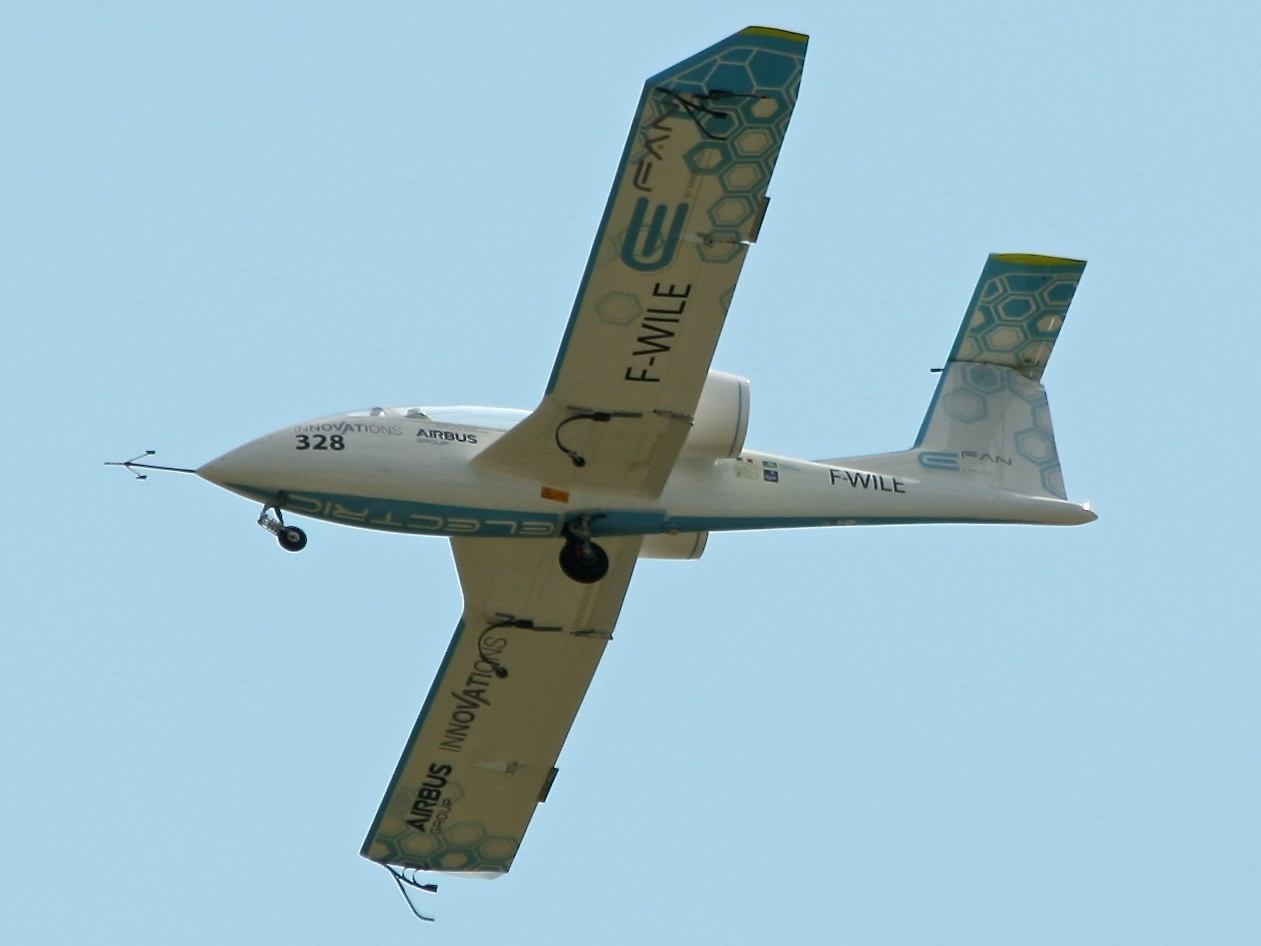
- Airbus E-Fan in flight at 2014 Berlin Air Show

General information
- Type: Electric aircraft
- Manufacturer: Airbus Innovations
- Designer: Didier Esteyne
- Status: Production cancelled (April 2017)
- Number built: 1

History
- Introduction date: 2017
- First flight: 11 March 2014

The Airbus E-Fan is a prototype two-seater electric aircraft that was under development by Airbus. It was flown in front of the world press at the Farnborough Airshow in the United Kingdom in July 2014. The target market was intended to be pilot training, but production of the aircraft was cancelled in April 2017.

== Design and development ==
Airbus Group developed this electric aircraft with Aero Composites Saintonge. The aircraft uses on-board lithium-ion batteries to power the two electric motors and can carry one pilot and one passenger. A test flight was conducted in April 2014 at Bordeaux–Mérignac Airport, France, landing in front of a large audience, the French Minister of Industry Arnaud Montebourg being one of them. At the 2014 Farnborough Airshow, Airbus announced that the E-Fan 2.0 would go into production by 2017 with a side-by-side seating layout. Airbus stated at that time that there are plans for development of a commercial regional aircraft in the near future.

The E-Fan is an all-electric two-seat twin-motor low-wing monoplane of composite material structure. It has a T-tail and a retractable tandem landing gear with outrigger wheels. The two motors are mounted on either side of the rear fuselage.

Two production variants were initially planned, a two-seater E-Fan 2.0 for use as a trainer, and the E-Fan 4.0 four-seat touring aircraft. The E-Fan 4.0 appears identical to the E-Fan apart from a fuselage stretch. To increase flight duration the planned E-Fan 4.0 would have had a hybrid-electric system that will have a small engine to charge the battery (like a range extender), which would have increased its duration from 2 hours to 3.5 hours. The first flight of the E-Fan 2.0 was originally planned for 2017 and the E-Fan 4.0 for 2019.

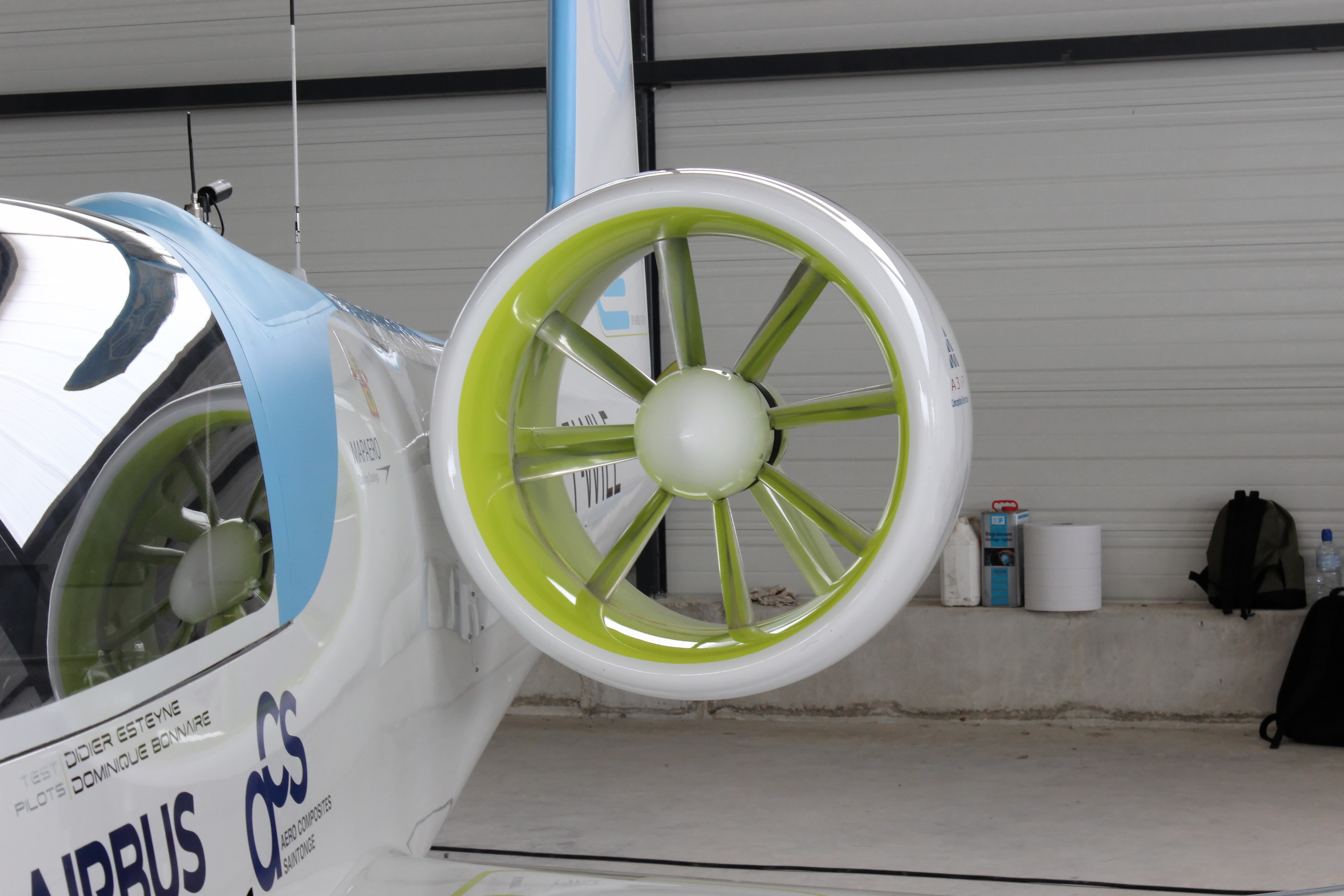
A ducted fan on the E-Fan

The E-fan is of all-composite construction and is propelled by two ducted, variable-pitch fans spun by two electric motors totaling 60 kW of power. Ducting increases thrust while reducing noise, and having the fans mounted centrally provides better control. The motors moving the fans are powered by a series of 250-volt lithium polymer battery packs made by South Korean company Kokam. The batteries are mounted in the inboard section of the wings. They have enough power for one hour and take one hour to recharge. An onboard backup battery is available to make an emergency landing if power runs out while airborne. The E-fan's landing gear consists of a retractable fore and aft wheel, and a fixed wheel under the wings. Unusually for an aircraft, the main wheel is powered by a 6 kW electric motor, which allows the plane to be taxied without the main motors, and is able to accelerate it to 60 km/h (37 mph; 32 kn) for takeoffs. Having the takeoff run performed by the undercarriage relieves some of the burden on the flight motors.

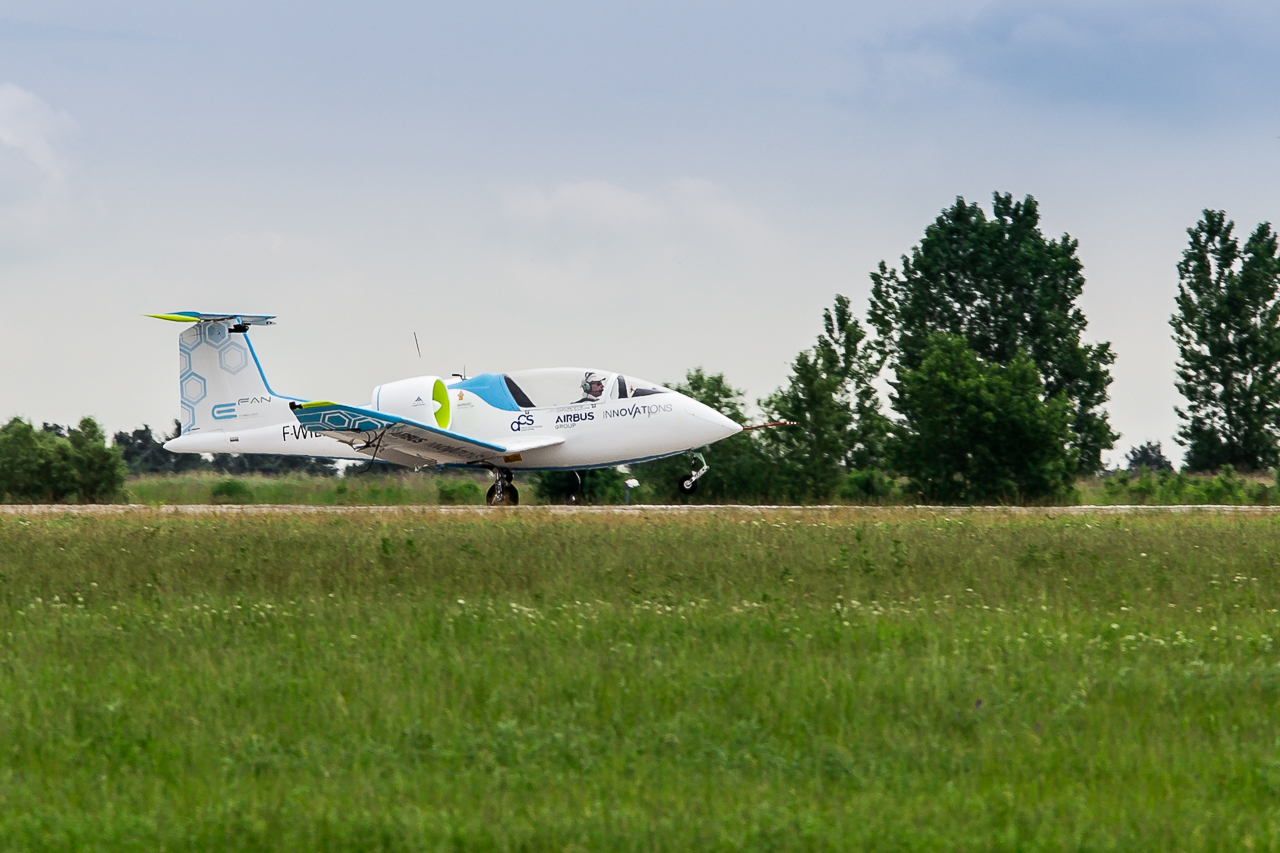

In December 2014 Airbus announced that DAHER-SOCATA would complete the design work on the aircraft and certify it. VoltAir, an Airbus subsidiary, developed the initial prototype and worked with Daher-Socata during the testing phase as the project manager. At this point the aircraft became the VoltAir E-Fan.

On 30 April 2015 the company announced that the aircraft would be produced at Pau Pyrénées Airport, south-west France, at a new facility, that would be near the DAHER-SOCATA plant at Tarbes. First deliveries were at that time expected at the end of 2017 or early 2018.

In April 2017 Airbus cancelled production of the E-Fan, preferring to concentrate on a proposed hybrid-electric, regional jet-sized aircraft, with an initial service date of 2030.

== Operational history ==
On 9 July 2015, the E-Fan crossed the English Channel from Lydd Airport to Calais–Dunkerque Airport. It was flown by Didier Esteyne, the chief engineer of the E-Fan. Initially this was claimed as the first electric aircraft to cross the English Channel, but it has since been pointed out that there were previous such flights, including MacCready Solar Challenger as long ago as 1981, and Airbus now say it was the "first all-electric two-engine aircraft" to make the crossing. Siemens has sponsored electric equipment on the E-fan, but not motors.

== Variants ==
E-Fan
Two-seat concept aircraft and technology demonstrator, first flown March 2014.
E-Fan 2.0
Proposed all-electric two-seat production variant, initially forecast to fly in 2017.
E-Fan 4.0
Proposed hybrid-electric four-seat variant, to fly 2019; a kerosene fuelled generator would have extended endurance from 2 h to 3 h 30 min.
E-Thrust
Proposed 90-seat regional jet based on the principles of the E-Fan.

== Specifications ==
Data from Jane's All the World's Aircraft 2014/15 and Airbus

General characteristics

- Crew: one
- Capacity: one passenger
- Length: 6.67 m (21 ft 11 in)
- Wingspan: 9.50 m (31 ft 2 in)
- Max takeoff weight: 550 kg (1,213 lb)
- Powerplant: 2 × Electric motor , 30 kW (40 hp) each via eight-blade ducted fans,each producing thrust of 0.75 kN (266 lb st), Battery: Lithium-ion 18650, with 207 Wh/kg per cell, total of 29 kWh at a battery weight of 167 kg

Performance

- Maximum speed: 220 km/h (140 mph, 120 kn) all performance figures estimated
- Cruise speed: 160 km/h (99 mph, 86 kn)
- Endurance: 60 min
- Lift-to-drag: 16:1

== See also ==
- Airbus E-Fan X
