= Hybrid electric aircraft =

Aircraft with combined electric and combustion propulsion

A hybrid electric aircraft is an aircraft with a hybrid electric powertrain. As the energy density of lithium-ion batteries is much lower than aviation fuel, a hybrid electric powertrain may effectively increase flight range compared to pure electric aircraft. By May 2018, there were over 30 hybrid electric aircraft projects, and short-haul hybrid-electric airliners were envisioned from 2032. Sometimes flight is all electric with fuel for backup.

== History ==
The Boeing Truss-Braced Wing subsonic concept was planned with hybrid electric propulsion. The Diamond DA36 E-Star first flew on 8 June 2011, the first flight of a series hybrid powertrain, reducing fuel consumption and emissions by up to 25%, a technology scalable to a 100-seater airliner. A small and 100 kg (220 lb) lighter Austro Engine 40 hp (30 kW) Wankel engine generates the electricity, supplemented by EADS batteries for silent take off, feeding a Siemens 70 kW (94 hp) electric motor turning the propeller. The AgustaWestland Project Zero was intended to be hybrid-electric.

=== 2011 ===
NASA sponsored a centennial challenge to encourage the development of the world's most fuel-efficient airplane. The contest was co-sponsored by Google and conducted in California. Amongst the entrants was the world's first parallel gas-electric hybrid aircraft called the EcoEagle, built by students of Embry-Riddle Aeronautical University, two electric airplanes - the Pipistrel Taurus G4 and the eGenius.

=== 2014 ===
Faradair Aerospace launches a Triple Box-wing hybrid electric aircraft concept Called the BEHA (Bio Electric Hybrid Aircraft) as one of the world's first regional aircraft specifically designed for hybrid electric regional flight. The UK start-up has continued development from the initial concept to the latest BEHA M1H variant, with future opportunity for unmanned and all electric variants. The E-STOL BEHA has gained support from key members of the UK Government and the airframe development has been conducted at Swansea University.

=== 2017 ===
Zunum Aero, backed by Boeing and JetBlue, is working since 2014 on a family of 10- to 50-seat hybrid electric regional aircraft. On 5 October 2017, Zunum launched the development of a six-to-twelve-seat aircraft. Aiming to fly in 2020 and be delivered in 2022, it should lower operating costs by 40–80% to reach available seat miles (ASM) costs of a 78-seat Dash 8-Q400.

On 28 November 2017, Airbus announced a partnership with Rolls-Royce plc and Siemens to develop the E-Fan X hybrid-electric airliner demonstrator, to fly in 2020.

=== 2018 ===
The 1,300-shp GE Catalyst could be used in hybrid-electric propulsion: in late 2016, General Electric modified a GE F110 fighter turbofan to extract 250 kW from its HP turbine and 750 kW from its LP turbine, supported by the USAF Research Laboratory and NASA, developed and tested a 1-megawatt electric motor/generator with GE Global Research, and tested a liquid-cooled inverter converting 2,400-volt DC to three-phase AC with silicon carbide-based switches and 1.7-kW MOSFET power modules.

Industry experts expects a 50+ seat hybrid-electric airliner to debut in commercial operation by 2032 for routes like London-Paris.

By November of 2018, Zunum Aero offices have been closed and all 70 staff members laid off as the programme comes to an end.

The EU funded the Hypstair program with €6.55 million over three years till 2016 for a TRL of 4: a Pipistrel Panthera mockup received a serial hybrid-electric powertrain, ground testing a 200-kW motor driven by batteries only, by a 100-kW generator-only and by both combined. It is followed by Mahepa project from 2017, EU-funded over four years with €9 million under the Horizon 2020 research program to reduce aviation carbon emissions by 70% in 2050, till TRL 6 before entering product development.

The Panthera drivetrain will be divided in modules: electric motor thrust generator and internal combustion power generator in the nose, human-machine interface and computing, fuel and batteries in the wing. Ground testing is planned for 2019 before flight tests in 2020.

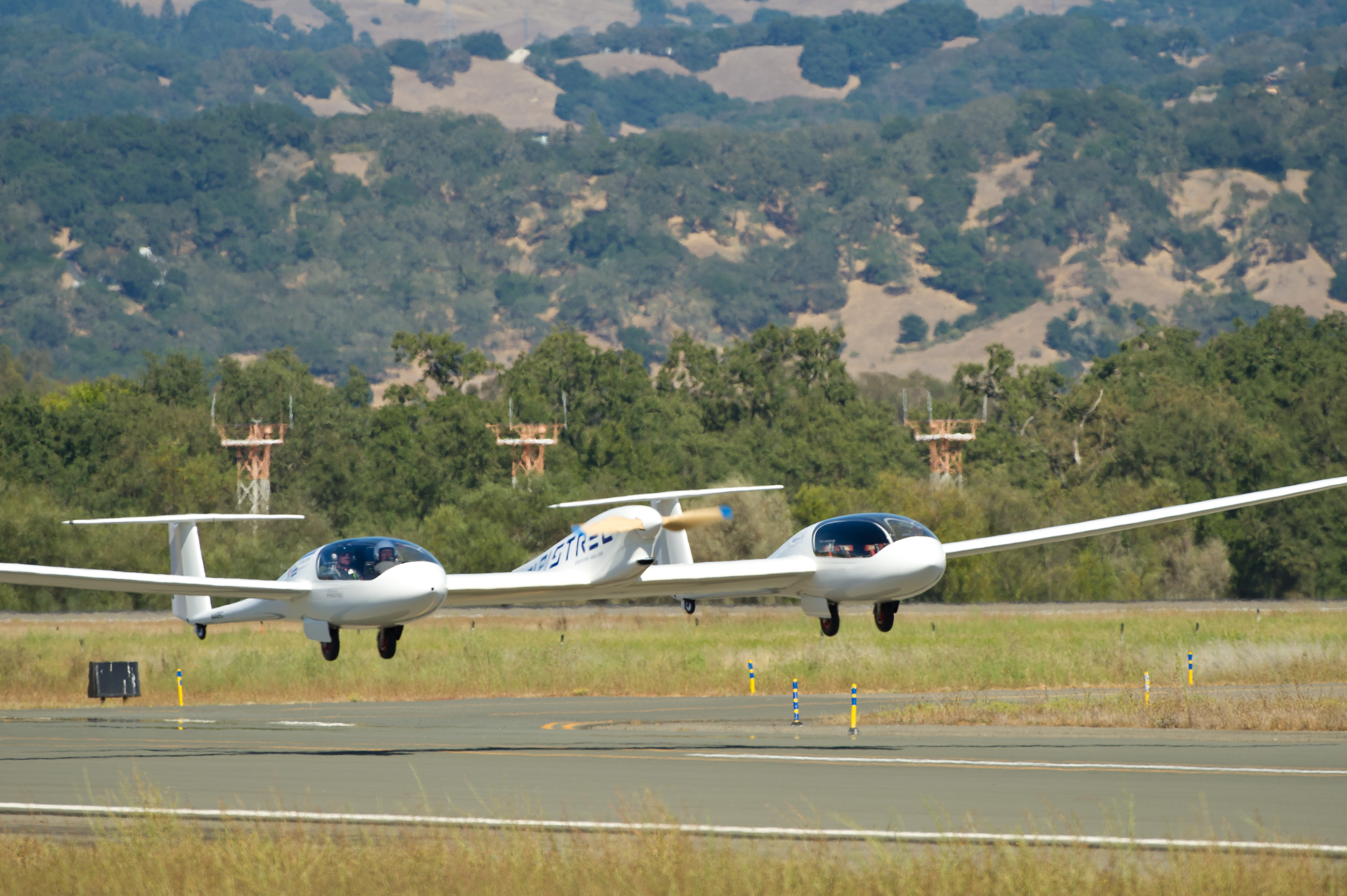
The Pipistrel Taurus G4 taking off from the Sonoma County Airport in California

The dual-fuselage, four-seat, battery-powered Pipistrel Taurus G4 received a DLR hydrogen fuel cell powertrain to fly as the HY4 in September 2016, with hydrogen tanks and batteries in the fuselages, fuel cells and motor in the central nacelle. Partners are German motor and inverter developer Compact Dynamics, Ulm University, TU Delft, Politecnico di Milano and University of Maribor.

Ground and flight tests should follow those of the Panthera a couple of months later.

Along their ground handling, scaling to 19- and 70-seat airliners will be studied in two configurations: more of the same size modules for electric distributed propulsion, or larger sized modules extrapolating the flight-test results, powering twin propellers. Flights will test system behavior, measure performance and reliability, and evaluate failure modes. A failure rate of one per 10 million hours is targeted, as low as in airliners, with very reliable components or with redundancy.

Austrian company ScaleWings, developer of a P-51 Mustang scale replica, has developed a hybrid and redundant piston/electric engine, based on independent modules: a 1.15 L (70 cu in) four-stroke V-twin producing 80 and 120 hp (60 and 89 kW) when turbocharged, and electric motors, producing 170 to 350 hp (130 to 260 kW) combined.

VoltAero is a startup company formed in September 2017 by the CTO and test pilot of the 2014 Airbus E-Fan 1.0, located in Royan and established with the support of the French Nouvelle-Aquitaine region. The company is developing a hybrid testbed based on the Cessna 337 Skymaster, which it intends to fly in late February 2019. The clean-sheet, all-composite VoltAero Cassio prototype should follow in 2020, before deliveries in late 2021 or early 2022. It will be powered by two 60 kW (80 hp) electric motors driving tractor propellers on the wing and a 170 kW (230 hp) piston engine and 150 kW (200 hp) motor driving a pusher propeller in the aft fuselage. The combination of fuel and batteries will give it a 1,200 km (650 nmi) range with nine people aboard.

On 31 October 2018, Diamond Aircraft flew the HEMEP, funded by Germany’s economics ministry and the Austrian Research Promotion Agency, reaching 130 kn (240 km/h) and 3,000 ft (910 m) within 20 minutes. It is a modified DA40 with its single piston engine replaced by two Siemens 75 kW (101 hp) electric motors in the nose powered by a 110 kW (150 hp) Austro Engine AE 300 diesel or two 12 kWh (43 MJ) batteries, for a 5 h. endurance or 30 min. on batteries only.

=== 2019 ===
By January 2019, U.S. startup Ampaire was replacing the Cessna 337 Skymaster (a push-pull aircraft) aft piston engine with an electric motor, to fly the prototype on Hawaiian Mokulele Airlines commuter routes operated with Cessna Caravans. Seven other airlines are interested by Caravan or Twin Otter conversions: Seattle’s Kenmore Air, Tropic Air of Belize, Puerto Rico–based Vieques Air Link, Southern Airways Express of Memphis, Tennessee, Guernsey’s Aurigny and Star Marianas Air, based in the Northern Mariana Islands, as well as Norway. Test flights will take place on a 28 miles (45 km) route over 15 minutes between Kahului Airport in Central Maui and Hana Airport on the East side. The hybrid prototype held its first public test flight on June 6, 2019, before scheduled service planned for 2021. Personal Airline Exchange (PAX) became the launch customer for the Ampaire Electric EEL modified six-seat Skymaster, to be certified in 2021, with an order for 50 plus 50 options.

By March 2019, UTC was converting a 39-seat Bombardier Dash 8 Q100 into a hybrid-electric for demonstration flights from 2022 within its Project 804. The 2 MW (2,700 hp) design is similar to the Airbus E-Fan X program, but aims for certification and production for a subsequent commercial offer. One 2,150 hp (1,600 kW) PW121 turboprop will be replaced by a 1 MW (1,300 hp) gas turbine joined with an electric motor of the same rating, powered by off-the-shelf lithium-ion batteries for takeoff and climb. The turbine is used alone in cruise and drives the motor-generator to recharge the batteries in descent. The downsized engine operates at its optimum for 30% fuel savings over 200–250 nmi (370–460 km). Range is reduced from 1,000 to 600 nmi (1,900 to 1,100 km) due to the higher empty weight and 50% lower fuel capacity.

Faradair Aerospace launched its 18 seat BEHA M1H during Revolution.aero in March, London, with turboprop hybrid propulsion and 'quick change' passenger/cargo capability, targeting the CS23/Part23 commuter category regulations. The E-STOL aircraft capable of operation on runways of less than 300m with 5 tonne payload from its unique Triple box-wing configuration and quiet ducted fan pusher configuration.

At the June 2019 Paris Air Show, Daher, Airbus and Safran teamed up to develop the TBM-based EcoPulse demonstrator, with half of the €22 million ($25 million) demonstration funded by the DGAC. The maiden flight is scheduled for the summer of 2022 before a hypothetical 2025–2030 certification. The aircraft’s existing engine will be supplemented by six 45 kW (60 hp) safran electric motor on the wing fed by a 100 kW (130 hp) APU or batteries. Similar to the NASA X-57 Maxwell, the distributed propulsion reduces wingtip vortices and add low speed lift by blowing the wing, enabling a smaller, lower drag wing.

A mid-May 2019 survey for UBS shows 38% of Americans and Germans said they would be likely to fly in a hybrid-electric airplane, rising to more than 50% for 18–44-year-olds. UBS thinks hybrid aircraft for up to nine passengers over short routes below 250 nmi (460 km) could be available from 2022, and 2028 for regional airliners up to 1 h routes. UBS forecast a market for 16,000 hybrid-electric airplanes and $178–192 billion over 2028–2040, mostly in general aviation, light business jets and regional aircraft with 20% lower operating costs than present 50–70 seaters.

Led by Cranfield Aerospace Solutions (CAeS), Project Fresson started on 1 October 2019, to fly an electric Britten-Norman BN-2 Islander within 30 months before an EASA STC within another 6–12 months. It targets a 60 min endurance plus 30 min reserves and with energy five times cheaper than Avgas and reduced maintenance, the conversion cost could be recovered in three years and it would have a range-extender combustion engine. Half of the £18 million ($22 million) funding come from the partners and the other half from the UK government. Of 800 Islanders in service, around 600 are used for short flights. Loganair should use it for short interisland hops off northern Scotland.

Electric EEL developer Ampaire and aircraft modification specialist Ikhana Aircraft Services study a 19 seat, diesel-electric hybrid de Havilland Canada DHC-6 Twin Otter. It could use Ikhana's STC for an increased MTOW from 5,443 to 6,350 kg (12,000 to 14,000 lb), the study is expected to be completed by the end of 2019.

=== 2020 ===
Supported by Bavarian funding, the German DLR is modifying one of its two Do 228 into a hybrid-electric demonstrator. The first fully electric flight is planned for 2020 and the first hybrid-electric flight for 2021, apparently from Cochstedt Airport. Partners include MTU Aero Engines and Siemens, of which Rolls-Royce plc is acquiring the electric propulsion unit.

In April of 2020, the E-FanX programme supported by Rolls-Royce plc, Airbus and Siemens is cancelled.

By July 2020, Faradair Aerospace announces relocation to Duxford Airfield, Cambridgeshire, UK in partnership with the Imperial War Museum Duxford and Gonville and Caius College, Cambridge, to develop the BEHA M1H prototype hybrid electric regional aircraft from a new bespoke prototyping facility as part of the new Duxford Avtech aerospace research and development campus. First flight is targeted for late 2023/early 2024.

In November 2020, Embraer had a new design for a regional airliner avoiding an hybrid-electric drivetrain, as operating costs would increase by 15% for 5% of the required power compared to conventional turboprop.

=== 2021 ===
The Berlin-Brandenburg Aerospace Alliance is a business cluster that includes Rolls-Royce Dahlewitz, MTU Aero Engines, aeronautical engineering specialist APUS and Stemme. It plans the IBEFA-i6 project, a 19-seat distributed electric propulsion demonstrator to fly in 2021 with turbodiesel, gas turbine and fuel-cell generators.

Separate from this i-6, the APUS i-5 will be a twin-boom testbed with tandem seating for a 4 t (8,800 lb) gross-weight. A Rolls-Royce 250 turboshaft will drive four electric propellers through a battery, generators, convertors, and power controls. Supported by the German state of Brandenburg and the Brandenburg University of Technology, flights should begin after 2021.

=== 2022 ===
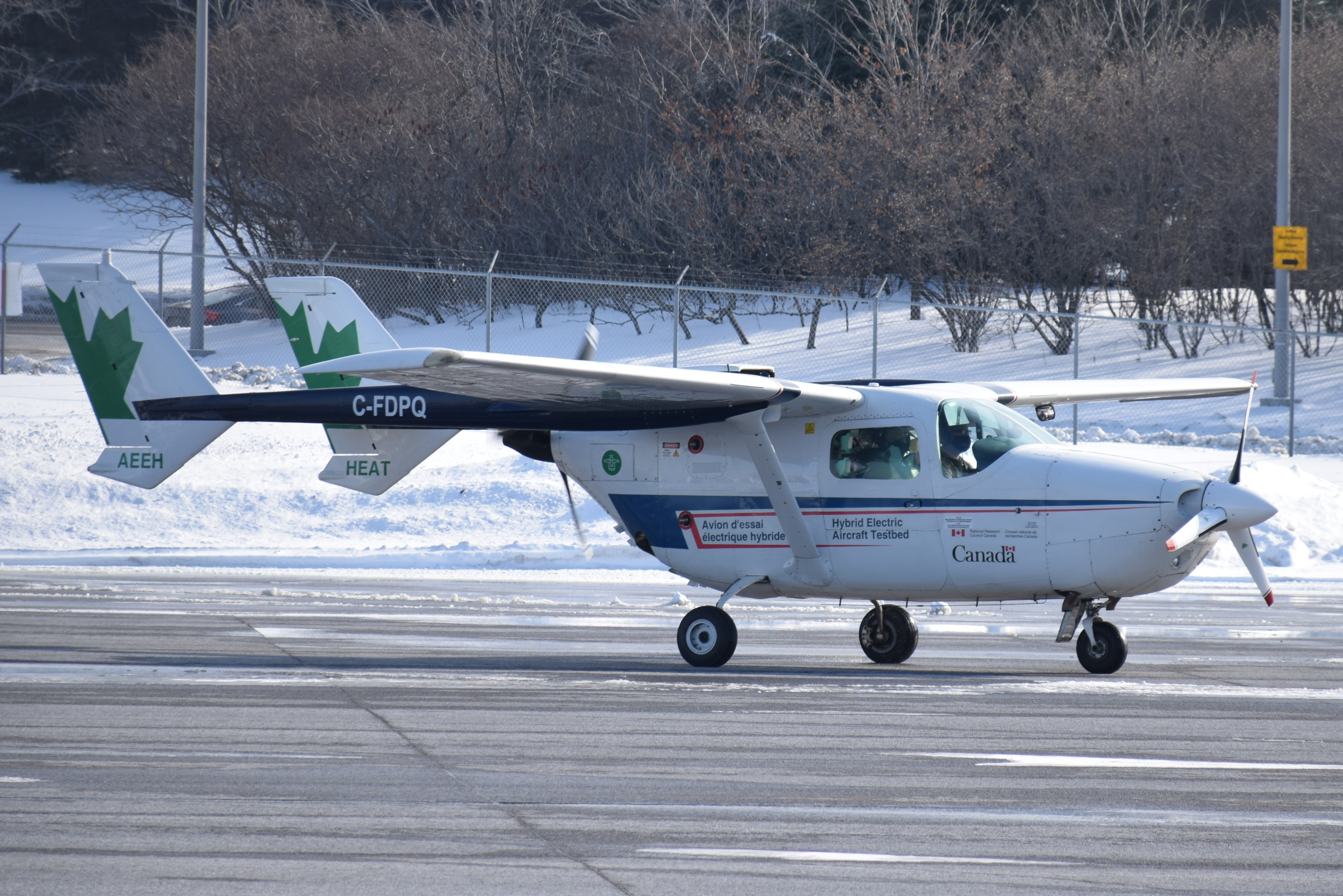
The Hybrid Electric Aircraft Testbed of National Research Council Canada, a converted Cessna Skymaster

In 2019, the National Research Council Canada started to convert a Cessna Skymaster, a push-pull configuration, the Hybrid Electric Aircraft Testbed. It first flew on 7 February 2022.

=== 2023 ===
On 19 January 2023, ZeroAvia flew its Dornier 228 testbed with one turboprop replaced by a prototype hydrogen-electric powertrain in the cabin, consisting of two fuel cells and a lithium-ion battery for peak power. The aim is to have a certifiable system by 2025 to power airframes carrying up to 19 passengers over 300 nmi (560 km).

=== 2024 ===
On July-August 2024, DARPA and Northrop Grumman announced the Northrop Grumman XRQ-73 SHEPARD (Series Hybrid Electric Propulsion Aircraft Demonstration).

== See also ==
- Environmental effects of aviation
