= List of Iraqi submissions for the Academy Award for Best International Feature Film =

Best International Feature Film submissions from Iraq

Highlights
- Debut: 2005
- Submissions: 15
- Nominations: none
- Oscar winners: none

Iraq has submitted films for the Academy Award for Best International Feature Film (Note: The category was previously named the Academy Award for Best Foreign Language Film, but this was changed to the Academy Award for Best International Feature Film in April 2019, after the Academy deemed the word "Foreign" to be outdated.) since 2005. The award is handed out annually by the United States Academy of Motion Picture Arts and Sciences to a feature-length motion picture produced outside the United States that contains primarily non-English dialogue. It was not created until the 1956 Academy Awards, in which a competitive Academy Award of Merit, known as the Best Foreign Language Film Award, was created for non-English speaking films, and has been given annually since.

As of 2026, Iraq has submitted fifteen films, but none of them were nominated.

== Submissions ==
The Academy of Motion Picture Arts and Sciences has invited the film industries of various countries to submit their best film for the Academy Award for Best International Feature Film since 1956. The International Feature Film Committee oversees the process and reviews all the submitted films. Following this, they vote via secret ballot to determine the five nominees for the award.

The President's Cake (2025) advanced to the December shortlists, but it was not nominated.

All the films submitted are primary in Arabic or Kurdish. Below is a list of the films that have been submitted by Iraq for review by the academy for the award by year and the respective Academy Awards ceremony.

Year (Ceremony)	Film title used in nomination	Original title	Language	Director	Result
2005 (78th)	Requiem of Snow	شیوەنی بەفر	Kurdish	Jamil Rostami	Not nominated
2006 (79th)	Dreams	أحلام	Arabic	Mohamed Al-Daradji	Not nominated
2007 (80th)	Jani Gal	ژانی گەل	Kurdish	Jamil Rostami	Not nominated
2010 (83rd)	Son of Babylon	ابن بابل	Arabic	Mohamed Al-Daradji	Not nominated
2014 (87th)	Mardan		Kurdish	Batin Ghobadi	Not nominated
2015 (88th)	Memories on Stone	بیرەوەرییەکانی سەر بەرد	Kurdish	Shawkat Amin Korki	Not nominated
2016 (89th)	El clásico	ئێل کلاسیکۆ	Kurdish	Halkawt Mustafa	Not nominated
2017 (90th)	Reseba: The Dark Wind	العاصفة السوداء	Arabic, Kurdish	Hussein Hassan	Not nominated
2018 (91st)	The Journey	الرحلة	Arabic	Mohamed Al-Daradji	Not nominated
2021 (94th)	Europa	أوروبا	Arabic, Bulgarian, English	Haider Rashid	Not nominated
2022 (95th)	The Exam	ئەزموون	Kurdish	Shawkat Amin Korki	Not nominated
2023 (96th)	Hanging Gardens	جنائن معلقة	Arabic	Ahmed Yassin Al Daradji	Not nominated
2024 (97th)	Baghdad Messi	ميسي بغداد	Arabic, Kurdish	Sahim Omar Kalifa	Not nominated
2025 (98th)	The President's Cake	مملكة القصب	Arabic	Hasan Hadi	Made shortlist
2026 (99th)	No Paradise If You Are Killed by a Woman	بەهەشت نابینیت ئەگەر ژن بتکوژێت	Kurdish, Norwegian, Arabic, English	Halkawt Mustafa	Pending

== See also ==
- List of Academy Award winners and nominees for Best International Feature Film
- List of Academy Award-winning foreign language films
- Cinema of Iraq
