= Dagmar Bruckmayerová =

Slovak actress (born 1969)

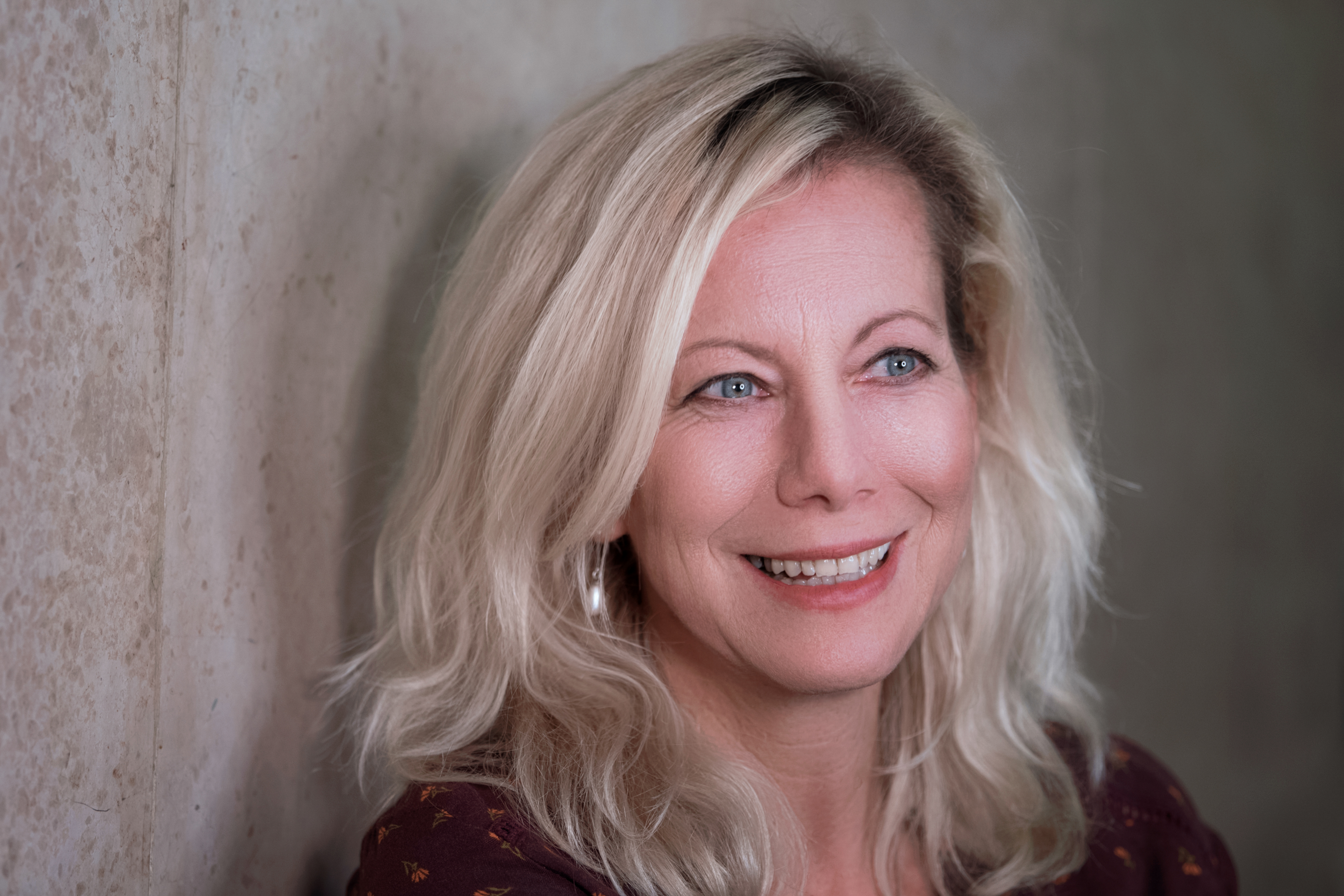
- Bruckmayerová in 2018
- Born: Dagmar Bajnoková; 20 May 1969 (age 56); Bratislava, Czechoslovakia
- Occupations: Actress; voice actress
- Years active: 1985–present
- Spouse(s): Peter Rúfus (1992–2005); Tibor Bruckmayer (2007–present)
- Children: Tereza (1993)

Dagmar Bruckmayerová (née Bajnoková; 20 May 1969) is a Slovak actress. She was born in Bratislava. She is of partially Hungarian origin on her father's side.

== Biography ==
=== Early life and education ===
After graduating from middle school in 1983, Bruckmayerová applied to a gymnasium in Krasňany. At the same time, she started attending the Ludus theatre, which was at that time still an amateur theatre targeted towards younger audiences, with performances of both national and foreign classics. Bruckmayerová got her first major role in 1985 in the play Fairytale by Ján Buzássy. Some of her fellow actors and colleagues would later become well-known actors, including Vladimír Hajdu, Roman Luknár, Andrej Kraus, Michal Gučík, Peter Sklár, Elena Podzámska, Oľga Belešová, and others.

Bruckmayerová first began studying acting at the Academy of Performing Arts in Bratislava (VŠMU) in 1987 and graduated from the faculty of theatre in 1991. Some of her better-known classmates include Roman Pomajbo, Peter Mankovecký, Roman Matisko, Zuzana Mauréry, and Henrieta Mičkovicová.

During her academic years, the young actress performed in various theatre plays. She worked at the Slovak National Theatre (SND), the Pavol Országh Hviezdoslav theatre (DPOH), the Malá scéna theatre, and Astorka Korzo '90 theatre. In 1988, she played the small role of Xenia, the daughter of Godunov, in a play inspired by Russian history – Dmitry Samozvanets, by classic Slovak author Ján Palárik. She got a bigger role in the historical drama Herodes and Herodias, written by P. O. Hviezdoslav, and directed by Miloš Pietor. She also took on the role of Oscar Wilde's Salome, garnering positive reviews: "The convincing Dagmar Bajnoková performed in the premiere, achieving all that could be expected from a debuting student of acting."

The two most important moments in her early career, were roles in the plays Mein Kampf and The Bald Soprano. In Main Kampf, directed by Roman Polák, she performed nude for several minutes:

"…the only thing I was wearing was a hat Mr. Labuda gave me. My parents were in visible despair, they didn’t even want to attend the premiere at first. After the play, my brother told me that it was a damn good thing I at least had the hat."

Another positive review of her performance reads: "The Grete of Dagmar Bajnoková is a sinful, yet innocent child. She lets herself get caressed by Schlomo, while, with the same amount of enthusiasm and ignorance, whispering vulgar insults about the "International Jewery" into Hitler´s ear. However, at the end of the play, she drastically learns that her game ends in tragedy."

=== Career ===
After graduating from the academy, Bruckmayerová started working at the Korzo '90 theatre (now Astorka Korzo '90), but after director Juraj Vaculík was removed from the post of artist in chief, she left the theatre alongside her coworker Rastislav Rogel. She then worked at Studio S theatre (now Studio L+S), where she performed in the comedy play Jacques and His Master, alongside Július Satinský and Milan Lasica.

Bruckmayerová also showed her talent in front of cameras by acting as an antagonist in various fairy tales for young children, until she was approached by director Ivan Petrovický with the role of a beautiful princess in the fable Princezná v ježovej koži (1994). With reference to the role, she has said: "I was fairly surprised when I heard I was going to play a princess… I just couldn't imagine myself as a melancholic beauty. When I was first applying to VŠMU, my brothers made fun of me, saying: 'Are you sure they will accept you? They only accept good-looking girls, you know...'" In the end, the fairy tale was well received in part due to Bruckmayerová's performance. One of her co-stars was Ján Kroner, in the role of the groomer Ján. Another point of interest is the fact that the actress performed the role of the young princess not too long after giving birth to her daughter Tereza. She was forced to step down from public life due to familial responsibilities, which meant her voice could only be heard in dubbed television programs and movies in cinemas. She has said: "I don't pick the characters, but I love doing voiceovers for the ones which have an emotionally rich life. They bear their burden and have something they want to say. The psychology behind such characters is completely different. Trying to get into the role and feel just as the actress on screen does is very important to me and sometimes doing voiceovers for these characters even brings me to tears."

At the turn of the millennium, Bruckmayerová overcame martial and divorce-related issues, and this era also marked her return to performing. She worked for several years at the Ján Palárik theatre in Trnava and performed in various television series. Her most famous role from this period is that of Nina Hodáková, a morally corrupt entrepreneur from the television series Klan. Speaking about the role, she said, "I enjoy the ability to be annoying and rude for once. In real life, I constantly pay attention to my language and try not to offend anyone, even with a mere word."

In Trnava, she starred in many plays, including Poet and Woman, Mother Died Twice, Couples at stake, Roses from the Heart, and Handvaerkerne. On the stage of Theatre West, she acted in the comedies Non Bébé (renamed to Scam in the reopened premiere at the Wünstenrot Theatre) and C'est jamais facile. The latter was directed by Ľubomír Roman, who also played one of the characters. A review of Scam read, "...actors Marek Majeský, Andrea Kvašňovská, Marián Labuda Jr., Dagmar Bruckmayerová and Dorota Letenajová were given a big opportunity under director and songwriter Nikita Slovák, to show their talent for comedy, their movement technique, and even their ability to spontaneously start singing on stage, which isn't a skill every actor possesses."

In both the movies Tango s komármi (2009) and Viditeľný svet (2011), the actress played a similar role of a lonely woman. In the former, she portrayed Tereza, who tries to seduce plumber Bohdan (Eugen Libezňuk) with various remarks, while he is working. In the second movie, she plays Veronika, who is determined to get a man by any means necessary, with little regard for the annoying stalking of the protagonist Oliver (Ivan Trojan). Neither of these cases work out: in Viditeľný svet, Verokina even admits that: "I enjoy my job so much, it feels like there isn’t much time for anything else… Sometimes I think that happiness doesn't even exist anymore”.

== Selected filmography ==
=== Television ===
List of television appearances, with title, production type, country, year, director, and role shown
Title	Production type	Country	Year	Director	Role	Note
Jablonka	Television movie	CSSR	1989	Ján Chlebík	Verona	
O troch sestrách	Television movie	CSFR	1990	Miloš Volný	Žofka	
Poslední	Television movie	CSFR	1990	Ivan Petrovický	Ľuba Kolomijcev	
Spoveď	Television movie (in two parts)	Slovakia	1994	Miloslav Luther	Young Parisian Bohemian woman	
Princezná v ježovej koži	Television movie	Slovakia	1994	Ivan Petrovický	Princess	
Čajová šálka lásky	Television movie	Slovakia	2000	Pavel Gejdoš Jr.	Anna Hummel	
Mesto tieňov	Television series	Slovakia	2008		Helena Bronanskád	1 episode

=== Film ===
List of film appearances, with title, country, year, director, and role shown
Title	Country	Year	Director	Role
Tango s komármi	Slovakia / Czech Republic	2009	Miloslav Luther	Tereza
Viditeľný svet	Slovakia / Czech Republic	2011	Peter Krištúfek	Veronika

=== Theatre ===
List of theatre appearances, with author, title, premiere, director, theatre, and role shown
Author	Title	Premiere	Director	Theatre	Role
Ján Palárik	Dmitry Samozvanets	10 December 1988	Pavol Haspra	Slovak National Theater	Xenia, daughter of Godunov
Alexander Griboyedov	Woe from Wit	17 June 1989	Miloš Pietor	Slovak National Theater	Daughter of Count Tugouchov
Pavol Országh Hviezdoslav	Herodes and Herodias	20 April 1990	Miloš Pietor	Slovak National Theater	Salome
Franz Kafka	The Trial	17 November 1990	Roman Polák	Astorka Korzo '90 Theatre	Girl
George Tabori	Mein Kampf	16 January 1991	Roman Polák	Slovak National Theatre	Grétka
Eugène Ionesco	The Bald Soprano	16 March 1991	Juraj Vaculík	Astorka Korzo '90 Theatre	Mrs. Smith
Colin Higgins	Harold and Maude	26 October 1991	Juraj Vaculík	Astorka Korzo '90 Theatre	Sunshine Doré
Milan Kundera	Jacques and His Master	12 May 1993	Martin Porubjak	Studio S / Studio L+S	Agáta, Daughter, Justina
Coline Serreau	Lapin lapin	7 April 1995	Pavol Haspra	Slovak National Theatre	Lucie
Miro Gavran	All About Women	17 October 2003	Michal Babiak	Ján Palárik theatre, Trnava	Agnes, Anita, Biba, Dubravka, Maria
Jozef Gregor-Tajovský	Statky-zmätky	5 March 2004	Břetislav Rychlík	Ján Palárik theatre, Trnava	Beta
Ján Smrek	Poet and Woman	16 April 2004	Michal Babiak	Ján Palárik theatre, Trnava	Woman 2
Vinko Möderndorfer	Mother Died Twice	19 November 2004	Michal Babiak	Ján Palárik theatre, Trnava	Marijana Dreksler
Molière	The Learned Ladies	26 February 2005	Michal Babiak	Ján Palárik theatre, Trnava	Armanda
Vladimír Hurban Vladimírov	Screeching Stamp	15 May 2005	Štefan Korenči	A.ha theatre, Bratislava	Liana
Matjaž Zupančič	Couples at Stake	27 January 2006	Michal Babiak	Ján Palárik theatre, Trnava	Soňa
Maurice Hennequin	Non Bébé	18 November 2006	Nikita Slovák	Theatre West, Bratislava	Meggie Scott
Milan Richter	Kafka's Second Life	28 February 2007	Michal Babiak	Ján Palárik theatre, Trnava	
Michal Babiak	Roses from the Heart	17 March 2007	Michal Babiak	Ján Palárik theatre, Trnava	Mata Hari
Jean-Claude Islert	C'est jamais facile	27 April 2007	Ľubo Roman	Theatre West, Bratislava	Maria
Mirjana Bobić Mojsilović	Imitation of Life	5 February 2009	Michal Babiak	Theatre Apollo, Bratislava	Olga Krunić, alias Sisi
Eugène Marin Labiche; Marc – Michel	La Station Champbaudet	9 April 2011	Ľubomír Vajdička	Ján Palárik theatre, Trnava	Widow Champbaudet
Maurice Hennequin	Scam	18 November 2011	Nikita Slovák	Theatre West, Bratislava	Maggie Scott
Line Knutzon	Handvaerkerne	4 May 2013	Viktor Kollár	Ján Palárik theatre, Trnava	Elizabeth
Peter Quilter	Respecting Your Peers	21 May 2017	Soňa Ferancová	Arena Theatre, Bratislava	Pam
