= Zuzana Mauréry =

Slovak actress and singer (born 1968)

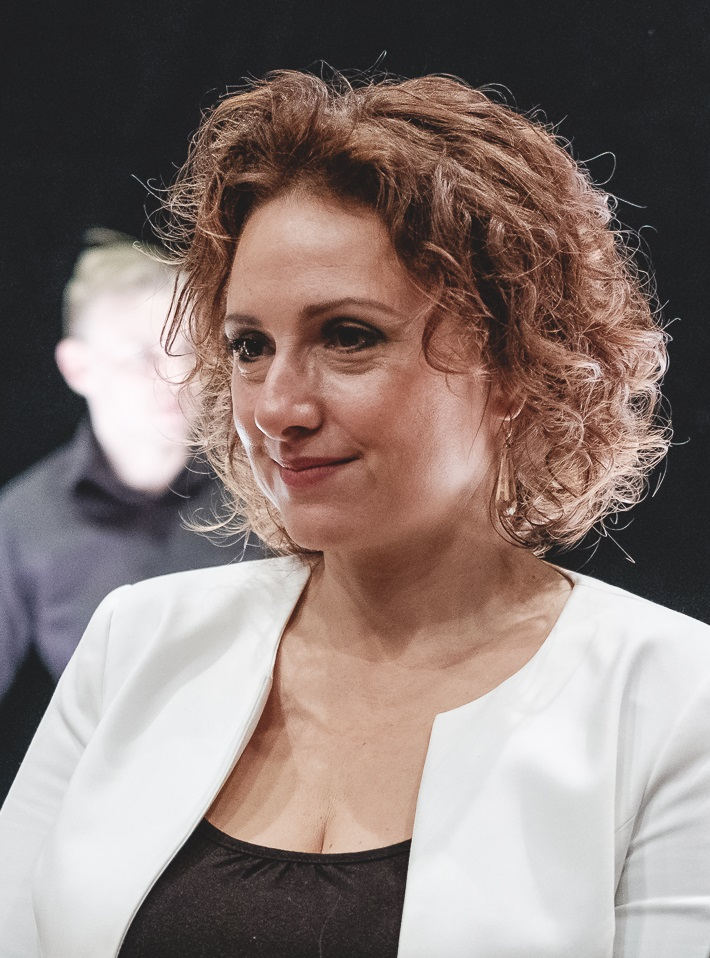
- Mauréry in 2017
- Born: Zuzana Mauréryová; 23 September 1968 (age 57); Bratislava, Czechoslovakia
- Education: Academy of performing Arts in Bratislava (VŠMU) (1987–1991)
- Occupations: Actress; singer
- Years active: 1985–present
- Website: zuzanamaurery.sk

Signature
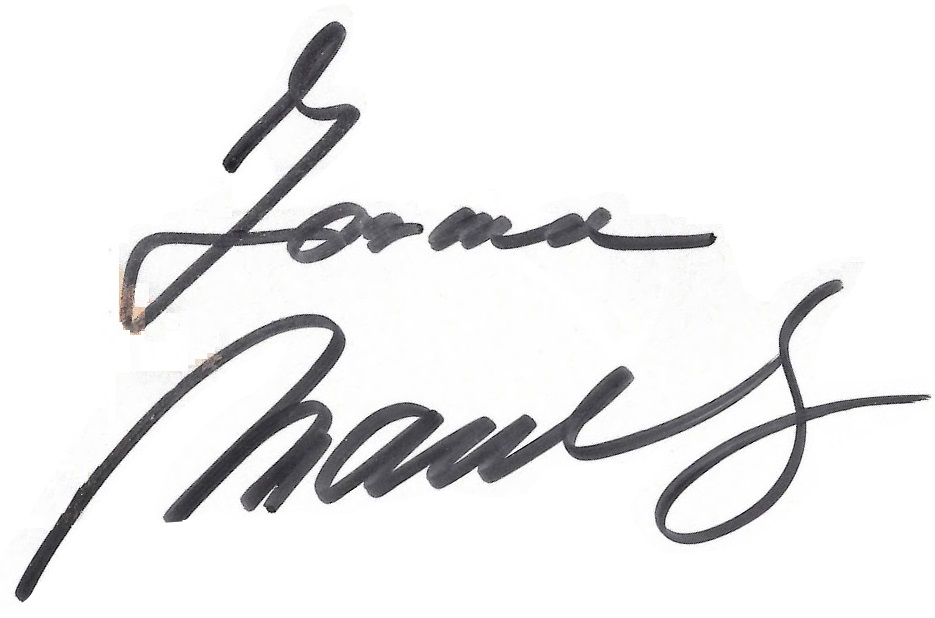

Zuzana Mauréry (born 23 September 1968) is a Slovak actress working in film, television, and on stage, as well as a musical singer. A six-time nominee for national movie awards and a two-time winner of the Sun in a Net Awards, she lives in her hometown of Bratislava. She is also a member of the Slovak movie and television academy.

== Early life and education ==
Mauréry comes from a family of musicians. Her father, Pavol Mauréry, was an opera soloist in the Slovak National Theatre for many years, while her mother, Darina Markovičová, was a choir soprano at the New Scene / Nová scéna theatre. She was born as their only child, during the period of normalization, shortly after the military intervention of the Warsaw pact in Czechoslovakia.

Thanks to her parents' profession, Mauréry grew up being financially secure. In her own words: "They frequently went to the West, which meant my clothes were quite western. I was the first in my school to wear so-called zipper pants". While attending a middle school for German speakers, she also took dance and piano lessons. Musicals fascinated her by their unusual form, though the singing itself did not. About her studies, Mauréry has said: "I spent my childhood locked up in my room, while my parents had their practice session – which was basically non-stop. I wanted to become a stewardess and study languages, which is why I started learning English alongside German". However, her parents persuaded her to study informatics at the nearby Juraj Hronec Grammar school in Bratislava instead, which was mainly focused on mathematical physics. Despite her focus on natural sciences, Mauréry successfully finished her studies in acting at the Academy of Performing Arts (VŠMU). She studied alongside such well-known actors as Roman Pomajbo, Peter Mankovecký, Dagmar Bruckmayerová, Zuzana Vačková, and Silvia Vargová.

== Career ==
Mauréry's filmography consists of a number of films, both short and feature-length, and various television productions. She has acted in various theatrical productions as well. Her first performance on a theatre stage was in 1985 at Reduta (until 1993 the theatrical studio of the Academy of Performing Arts in Bratislava). She performed alongside her father in the opera Iolanta by Pyotr Ilyich Tchaikovsky. She has also performed in several musical plays and has made vocal contributions to recordings of other performers.

She is the co-author of the movie Jsem větší a lepší (2007), which combines animated and live-action scenes, together with Martin Duda. The film got a positive reception at various movie festivals, including an international nomination from the American Academy of Motion Picture Arts and Sciences for the best student film of foreign origin. A different short movie, Almost There (2014), was made by Nonchalant, an alias of Mauréry. It won the prize for the best ensemble cast at the 13th Annual International Film Festival 24-hour Film Race, held in Brooklyn. Almost There featured such names as Gregor Hološka, Peter Kadlečík, Michal Jánoš, Anna Rakovská, Juraj Šimko, Mária Breiner-Mačáková, and Viera Frajtová.

=== Awards and recognition ===
Mauréry has been nominated four times for a Slovak film and television academy (SFTA) award – twice for a main role and twice for a minor one. She has also been a three-time laureate for the Igric Awards, organized by the Slovak Film Union (SFZ), the Union of Creators for Slovak Television (ÚSTT), and the Literary Fund (LF).

She was nominated for a Sun in a Net award for her role in the feature film Return of the Storks (2007), directed by Martin Repka, though she didn't win. She received the national movie award in 2014, when she was nominated by the SFTA twice at the same time. She managed to convince the expert jury with her performance in the bilingual drama Ďakujem, dobre (2012) by Mátyas Prikler. At the same time, she was nominated by the Czech Movie and Television Academy (ČFTA) for the Czech Lion award, for her role in the movie Colette (2013) by Milan Cieslar. She didn't win either award, but she received the Igric national creativity award for Best Female Performance. The actress earned a second Igric award for her performance in the Radio and Television of Slovakia (RTVS) series Tajné životy (2014), directed by Ján Sebechlebský.

Mauréry's performance in the competitive dance show Showdance (2010) on TV JOJ earned her the title "Queen of Dance", accompanied by a symbolic crown.

=== Charity and activism ===
Since the end of the first decade of the 21st century, the actress has been active in the spheres of social responsibility and charity. While she focuses mostly on her home city when it comes to protecting the environment, she tends to focus mostly on children and the elderly when it comes to charity and social help.

In January 2010, Mauréry played a key role in a written appeal regarding the preservation of the local Park kultúry a oddychu to the leaders of cultural and scientific development. Other key members included ecologist Mikuláš Huba, actress Zuzana Kronerová, and the member of parliament for the Old Town city district in Bratislava, Ivan Bútora. A year later, she became one of six diplomats of the environmental project of the capital, called Hanging Gardens of Bratislava. She promoted this project in March 2011 by giving an interview to TV Bratislava.

In 2009, 2010, and 2012, she repeatedly supported the nonprofit organization Foundation of the Children of Slovakia, through their public charity Hour for kids, without receiving royalties. She took part in a similar campaign in September 2010, Konto bariéry, which was focused on helping children and disabled youths. It was founded by a nongovernmental organization, The Children's Fund of Slovakia. Mauréry started working with the SOCIA (Foundation for the Support of Social Change) fund shortly afterwards. She worked on the marketing campaign for the calendar Age Affects Us (2011). The actress lent her likeness to the campaign Helping Ladybird, which is focused on helping elderly people. During the Concert of All Generations, which was organized by the same group two years later, she performed together with her father.

The actress has appeared in a similar capacity at various other concerts. She made an appearance at the seventh charitable concert of the Humanitarian council of Slovakia – Benificium (2008). Two years later, she appeared at the concert Flame of Hope, taking place a day before Christmas and sponsored by the fund Headquarters of Hope. In 2010, she symbolically supported the cause of homelessness by baptizing the book of Július, a former street vendor of the NotaBene magazine.

== Selected filmography ==
=== Film ===
List of film appearances, with year, title, and role shown
Title	Country	Year	Director	Role
Burning in the Wind	Italy / Switzerland	2001	Silvio Soldini	Katy
Quartétto	Czech Republic / Slovakia	2002	Laura Siváková	Viera
Return of the Storks	Slovakia	2007	Martin Repka	Gita
Ďakujem, dobre	Slovakia / Hungary	2012	Mátyás Prikler	Zuza
Colette	Czech Republic / Slovakia / the Netherlands	2013	Milan Cieslar	Broderova
Almost There (short)	Slovakia	2014	Zuzana Marianková	Mother
The Teacher	Czech Republic / Slovakia	2016	Jan Hřebejk	Mária Drazdechová

=== Television ===
List of television appearances, with year, title, and role shown
Title	Country	Year	Director	Role	Notes
Reverend	CSSR	1989	Miloš Pietor	Ms. Želka	TV miniseries
Výlety v pamäti	Slovakia	1993	Juraj Nvota	Apolónia Chalupcová	TV movie
Diagnóza: Vajíčko	Slovakia	1994	Ľuba Velecká	Róza	TV movie
Čierna ovca	Slovakia	1996	Juraj Nvota	Jana	TV movie
Svetlo	Slovakia	1998	Igor Kováč	Masseuse	TV movie
Čarovala ryba, aby bola chyba...	Slovakia	2000	Yvonne Vavrová	Mother of Veronica	TV series
Za mestskými múrmi: Čierna pani	Slovakia	2002	Ľuba Vančíková	Zuzana	TV movie
Luisa Sanfelice	Italy / France / Spain	2003	Paolo and Vittorio Taviani	Supervisor	TV miniseries
Osobná chyba	Slovakia	2005	Juraj Štepka	Mother	TV movie
Skrývačky	Czech Republic	2008	Martin Repka	Vilma	TV movie
Mesto tieňov	Slovakia	2008	Various	Elena Rašinská	TV series, season 1
Odsúdené	Slovakia / Czech Republic	2009–2010	Peter Bebjak	Eva Kollárová	TV series
Panelák	Slovakia	2009–2014	Various	Júlia Chutná / Júlia Féderová	TV series, seasons 3–14
Nesmrteľní	Slovakia	2010	Katarína Ďurovičová	Eva Krtová	TV series
Zlomok sekundy	Slovakia	2011	Ľuba Vančíková	Ivana Jevanová	TV series
Tajné životy	Slovakia	2014–2017	Ján Sebechlebský	Eva Lustigová	TV series
Karolovo posolstvo	Slovakia	2016	Martin Kandra	Mother	TV movie
Dovidenia, stará mama	Slovakia	2016	Viktor Csudai / Andrej Kraus	Guzel Pišingerová	TV series
Mária Terézia	Austria / Czech Republic / Hungary / Slovakia	2017	Robert Dornhelm	Mademoiselle de Chartres	TV miniseries
Za sklom	Slovakia	2018–2019	Peter Bebjak / Róbert Šveda / Zuzana Marianková / Michal Blaško	Jana "Kosatka" Balogová	TV series, seasons 2–3

== Theatre ==
Author	Title	Year	Director	Theatre	Role
Carlo Goldoni	The Vacation	1988	Ľubomír Vajdička	Slovak National Theater	Girl
Alexander Griboyedov	Woe from Wit	1989	Miloš Pietor	Slovak National Theater	Daughter of Count Tugouchov
Stanislav Štepka	Peace for This House	1990	Juraj Vaculík	Simple theatre of Radošina	Chúková / Lady Di
Stanislav Štepka	Women Department	1990	Juraj Nvota	Simple theatre of Radošina	Karolína
Stanislav Štepka	Boat World	1990	Juraj Nvota	Simple theatre of Radošina	Pola Negri / Nataša
Ondrej Šoth / Michal Novinski	Franz Kafka: The Light in the Darkness	1992	Ondrej Šoth	Slovak National Theater	Jesenská
Stanislav Štepka	Caress	1992	Juraj Nvota	Simple theatre of Radošina	Zuzana Lásková
Stanislav Štepka	Cannoneers on the Moon	1992	Juraj Nvota	Simple theatre of Radošina	Eva Gunarsonová
Stanislav Štepka	Tavern Grand	1993	Juraj Nvota	Simple theatre of Radošina	Tina
Ivan Bukovčan	Until the Cock Crows	1994	Pavol Haspra	Slovak National Theater	Marika Mondoková
Joe Masteroff / John Kander / Fred Ebb	Cabaret (musical)	1994	Juraj Nvota	Astorka Korzo '90 Theatre	Sally Bowles / Fräulein Kost / Kit Kat Girl
Coline Serreau	Lapin Lapin	1995	Pavol Haspra	Slovak National Theater	Marie
Stanislav Štepka	Birthmark	1995	Juraj Nvota	Simple theatre of Radošina	Otilka
Stanislav Štepka	Cinema Rise	1995	Ondrej Spišák	Simple theatre of Radošina	Narrator
Stanislav Štepka	Papa	1996	Ondrej Spišák	Simple theatre of Radošina	Eva
Stanislav Štepka	Final Station	1997	Juraj Nvota	Simple theatre of Radošina	Vitalošová, cleaner
Paul Abraham	Ball im Savoy	1998	Peter Oravec	New Scene theatre	La Tangolita
Stanislav Štepka	How I Returned to Myself	1998	Ondrej Spišák	Simple theatre of Radošina	Heart, Tear, Memory, Blood cell
Dan Goggin	Nunsense (musical)	1999	Karol Spišák	Teatro Wüstenrot	Sister Roberta
William Shakespeare / Román Polák / Miloš Ruppeldt Jr.	Sockspeare	1999	Roman Polák	New Scene theatre	Regan
Stanislav Štepka	Been in the Winter	1999	Milan Lasica	Simple theatre of Radošina	Francka, Angela, singer, woman from the film
Stanislav Štepka	Sharks Statement	2000	Juraj Nvota	Simple theatre of Radošina	Anna
Jim Jacobs / Warren Casey	Grease (musical)	2000	Jindřich Šimek	Park kultúry a oddychu, Bratislava	Rizzo
Jule Styne / Peter Stone / Bob Merrill	Sugar (musical)	2000	Milan Lasica	New Scene theatre	Sweet Sue
Franz Wittenbrink	The Secretaries	2002	Martin Porubjak	Slovak National Theater	Painter
William Shakespeare	Hamlet	2003	Anton Šulík Jr.	Arena Theatre, Bratislava	Gertruda
Robert Thomas	Eight Women	2003	Roman Polák	New Scene theatre	Pierette
Galt MacDermot / Gerome Ragni / James Rado	Hair (musical)	2003	Dodo Gombár	New Scene theatre	Ronny
Terrence McNally / David Yazbek	The Full Monty (musical)	2004	Jozef Bednárik	New Scene theatre	Vicky
Galt MacDermot / Gerome Ragni / James Rado	Hair (musical)	2004	Dodo Gombár	Brno City Theatre, Czech Republic	Victoria
Joe Masteroff / John Kander / Fredd Ebb	Cabaret (musical)	2004	Jozef Bednárik	Andrej Bagar Theatre, Nitra	Sally Bowles
William Shakespeare / Gérard Presgurvic	Romeo and Juliet	2005; 2006	Redha Benteifour	Raimund Theater, Vienna	Lady Montague / The Nurse
John Dempsey / Dana P. Rowe	The Witches of Eastwick (musical)	2007	Stanislav Moša	Brno City Theatre, Czech Republic	Felicie
Christian Kolonovits / Michaela Ronzoni	Die Habsburgischen (musical)	2007	Stefan Huber	Museumsquartier, Vienna	Maria Theresia
Andrew Lloyd Webber / Tim Rice	Jesus Christ Superstar (musical)	2008	Petr Gazdík	Brno City Theatre, Czech Republic	Herodes / Soulgirl
Ján Uličiansky	Kocúr na kolieskových korčuliach	2008	Ján Uličiansky	Slovak National Theater	Barbara Baranová
Victor Hugo / Alain Boublik / Claude-Michel Schönberg	Les Misérables (musical)	2009	Stanislav Moša	Brno City Theatre, Czech Republic	Madame Thénardier
Daniel Fikejz / Ivan Huvar / Rin Brezina / Petr Gazdík	Balada o lásce (Singoalla) (musical)	2009	Petr Gazdík	Brno City Theatre, Czech Republic	Shaman
Viliam Klimáček	In Da House	2010	Karol Vosátko	GUnaGU Theatre, Bratislava	Petra
Julian Fellowes / Richard M. Sherman / Robert Sherman / George Stiles / Anthony Drewe	Mary Poppins (musical)	2010	Petr Gazdík	Brno City Theatre, Czech Republic	Mrs. Andrews
Viliam Klimáček	A Big Killing on the Bill Gates Square	2011	Viliam Klimáček	GUnaGU Theatre, Bratislava	Eva
Paloma Pedrero	Noches de amor efímero	2011	Jana Janíková	Theatre in Řeznická Street, Prague	Carmen / Vanesa
Charles Dickens / Kryštof Marek / Ondřej Sokol	A Christmas Carol (musical)	2012	Ondřej Sokol	Studio DVA, Prague	Ghost of Christmas Past
Arnold Wesker	Ženy přežijí!	2012	Darina Abrahámová	Studio DVA, Prague	Minerva
Zděnek Merta / Stanislav Moša	Purgatory / Očistec	2013	Stanislav Moša	Brno City Theatre, Czech Republic	Marie, mother
Viliam Klimáček	Nízkotučný život	2013	Viliam Klimáček	GUnaGU Theatre, Bratislava	Anita
Eva Borušovičová	69 Things Better Than Sex	2013	Eva Borušovičová	Studio L+S, Bratislava	Boss
Hans Christian Andersen / Kryštof Marek / Šimon Caban	The Little Match Girl – A Christmas Story (musical)	2013	Šimon Caban	Studio DVA, Prague	Fortune
Jakub Nvota	I Remember Paris	2014	Jakub Nvota	Studio L+S, Bratislava	Karolína
Ephraim Kishon / (Hoffmann Ferenc)	Ach, Júlia! Och, Rómeo!	2015	Peter Oravec	Park kultúry a oddychu, Bratislava	Júlia
Matthieu Delaporte / Alexandre De La Patellière	Le Prénom	2016	Jakub Nvota	Studio L+S, Bratislava	Elisabeth
Petr Zelenka	Job Interviews	2016	Valeria Schulczová	City Theatre Pavol Országh Hviezdoslav, Bratislava	Viera

== Awards and nominations ==
Year	Work	Awards	Category	Result
Film
2006–2007	Return of the Storks	Sun in a Net Awards	• Best supporting actress	Nominated
2012–2013	Ďakujem, dobre	Sun in a Net Awards	• Best actress	Won
2013	Ďakujem, dobre	Igric Awards	• Best actress on television or in a movie	Won
2013	Colette	Igric Awards	• Best actress on television or in a movie	Won
2012–2013	Colette	Sun in a Net Awards	• Best supporting actress	Nominated
2013	Colette	Czech Lion Awards	• Best supporting actress	Nominated
2014	Almost There	24-hour Film Race	• Best acting ensemble ^{(collective award)}	Won
2016	The Teacher	Crystal Wing Awards	• Theatrical and audiovisual art	Won
2016	The Teacher	Crystal Globe	• Best actress	Won
2016	The Teacher	Czech Film Critics᾽ Awards	• Best actress	Nominated
2016	The Teacher	Czech Lion Awards	• Best actress	Nominated
2016	The Teacher	Sun in a Net Awards	• Best actress	Won
2016	The Teacher	Igric Awards	• Best actress on television or in a movie	Won
Television
2010	Showdance	Title "Queen of Dance"		Won
2012	Zlomok sekundy	Literary Fund Bonus		
2014	Tajné životy	Igric Awards	• Best actress on television or in a movie	Won
2016	Dovidenia, stará mama and The Teacher	OTO Awards	• Actress	Nominated
Stage
2004	Hair	Literary Fund Award	• Annual award for acting	Won
