= Zahraa Ghandour =

Iraqi actress and Film director (born 1991)

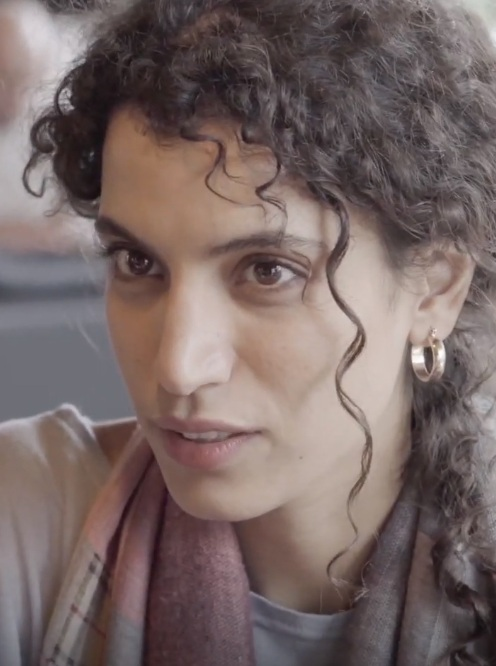
- Zahraa Ghandour, 2020 International Women’s Day, Baghdad
- Born: Baghdad, Iraq
- Occupations: actress and film director

Zahraa Ghandour is an Iraqi actress and film director.

Ghandour was born and raised in Baghdad to an Iraqi-Lebanese father and an Iraqi mother. In 2004, she left Iraq to live in Syria, then to Beirut, Lebanon. A few years later she returned to Iraq. Living in these three countries allowed her to master several Arabic dialects: Iraqi, Lebanese, Syrian and Palestinian. She is also fluent in English.

== Early career ==
Ghandour started her work in media at the age of 17. By the time she was 22, she had her own TV show (‘52 minutes’), a weekly documentary show focusing on social issues in Iraq.

She started as a writer and presenter and began also directing the show with the second season. Ghandour has held a variety of media jobs in online media, radio and television, where she presents the long-running technology show “Dot.IQ” on Sumaria TV.

== Acting ==
Alongside her work as a documentary filmmaker, Ghandour started an acting career that soon made her one of the most prominent figures of Iraq’s fledgling but dynamic film industry. Her work includes roles both in Arabic and English.

A chance encounter with Mohammed Al-Daradji, a well-established Iraq-based filmmaker, led to her getting the leading role in the acclaimed film “The Journey”, which premiered at TIFF in 2017 and represented Iraq in nominations in the foreign feature category at the 2019 Academy Awards. After working on her part for three years, her performance as Sara, a female suicide bomber, drew much attention and earned her widespread critical acclaim, as well as a number of awards. The film was released in France under the title "Baghdad Station" on 20 February 2019.

She was then called up by Baghdad-born Swiss filmmaker Samir for the main female role in his latest feature film, Baghdad in My Shadow, which is to be released in 2019.

In parallel, she is working on a number of acting projects for television, including for the Channel 4 series "Baghdad Central".

== Awards ==
- Won the Best actress award at the Muscat International Film Festival 2018.
- Nominated for best actress award by the Arab Film Center 2018.
- Won the best Best Actress award at the 4th Annual Asian Film Festival (US)
- She won the Best actress award at the 2018 Malmo Arab Fim Festival
- She won the Best actress award at the Festival des Cinémas Arabes 2018 organised by the Paris-based Arab World Institute(IMA)

== Filmography ==
Film
Year	Title	Role	Notes
2017	The Journey	Sara	An Iraqi drama film directed by Mohamed Al-Daradji
2019	Baghdad in My Shadow	Amal	By Swiss director ‘Samir’
2023	Baghdad Messi	Salwa	Directed by Sahim Omar Kalifa
