= The Journey (2017 film) =

2017 film

- Film poster
- Directed by: Mohamed Jabarah Al-Daradji
- Written by: Isabelle Stead Mohamed Jabarah Al-Daradji
- Produced by: Isabelle Stead; Mohamed Jabarah Al-Daradji; Helene Cases
- Starring: Zahraa Ghandour; Ameer Jabarah
- Cinematography: Duraid Munajim
- Edited by: Mohamed Jabarah Al-Daradji; Pascale Chavance; Hervé de Luze
- Music by: Mike Kourtzer; Fabien Kourtzer
- Production companies: Human Film; Iraqi Independent Film Center; Lionceau Film
- Release dates: 7 September 2017 (TIFF); 1 March 2018 (Iraq)
- Running time: 82 minutes
- Countries: Iraq; United Kingdom; France; Netherlands; Qatar
- Language: Arabic

The Journey (Arabic: الرحلة) is a 2017 Iraqi drama film written and directed by Mohamed Jabarah Al-Daradji. It was screened in the Contemporary World Cinema section at the 2017 Toronto International Film Festival. Upon premiering on 1 March 2018 in Iraq, the film became the first Iraqi film in 27 years to be released in the theaters of Iraq. It was selected as the Iraqi entry for the Best Foreign Language Film at the 91st Academy Awards, but it was not nominated.

== Plot summary ==
The Journey (Arabic: الرحلة) is a 2017 Iraqi drama film directed by Mohamed Jabarah Al-Daradji. The film is set in Baghdad on 30 December 2006, and follows the story of Sara, a young woman with sinister intentions. She enters Baghdad’s central train station with a plan to commit an unthinkable act – a suicide bombing during the station's reopening ceremony.

Sara's plan is disrupted when she encounters Salam, a confident and flirtatious salesman. This unforeseen encounter complicates her mission, leading to an intense psychological duel between the two characters. Salam becomes a hostage in Sara's confused plan, trying desperately to understand her motives and dissuade her from carrying out the attack.

Throughout the film, Salam's interactions with Sara force her to confront the potential consequences of her actions. He appeals to her humanity, leading to moments of reflection that challenge her resolve. The film delves deep into the psychological dichotomy of a potential suicide bomber, exploring themes of redemption, the impact of violence, and the possibility of change.

The film’s narrative is driven by the tension between Sara's intentions and Salam's efforts to prevent a catastrophe, providing a gripping and emotional exploration of their characters' inner struggles and the chaotic world around them.

== Cast ==
- Zahraa Ghandour as Sara
- Ameer Ali Jabarah as Salam

== See also ==
- List of submissions to the 91st Academy Awards for Best Foreign Language Film
- List of Iraqi submissions for the Academy Award for Best Foreign Language Film
