= Silk Screen Asian American Film Festival =

Annual film festival in Pittsburgh, Pennsylvania, U.S. (2005-2018)

- Founded: 2005
- Disestablished: 2018

The Silk Screen Asian American Film Festival was a 10-day film festival held annually in Pittsburgh, Pennsylvania to show the most recent films and music by artists with Asian ethnic origins, such as from Japan, China, Taiwan, India, Pakistan, Indonesia, Korea, Turkey, the Philippines, and The Middle East. It also included films whose topical matter is about Asians or Asian Americans.

Year-round programming included a Classic Asian Film Series. In Partnership with Pittsburgh Filmmakers, Silk Screen presented a classic Asian film each month, which was screened each Sunday of the month at Regent Square (Pittsburgh) Theater. New programming included an interview series, "Behind the Silk Screen", through which Silk Screen interviewed board members, artists, and community members about how they shape both Silk Screen and the culture around it. Silk Screen also held a children's event to celebrate the Chinese New Year.

The festival showed feature-length films and short films.

== Founder ==
In 2005, Harish Saluja founded Silk Screen Asian Arts & Culture Organization, which celebrates diversity and multiculturalism. Saluja is a filmmaker and artist residing in Pittsburgh, United States. He graduated with a degree from IIT, Kharagpur and spent the following four years working as an engineer in a mining company, before moving to the United States in 1971. He was hired at a publishing company – of which he eventually became co-owner. He then began working in film as a filmmaker.

In 2005, Saluja created Silk Screen, an Asian arts and culture non-profit, with a mission to promote diversity and cross-cultural understanding through immersion in the arts. Silk Screen hosted a variety of cultural events throughout the year including dance performances, film screenings and concerts.

== 2014 Film Festival ==
The ninth annual Silk Screen Asian American Film Festival began Friday, April 25, 2014 with a gala party, and ran for 10 days. The festival showcased 25 feature films and two short films during 47 screening events taking place at Regent Square Theater, Carnegie Museum of Natural History, The Andy Warhol Museum and Waterworks Cinemas. Films and filmmakers from the 2014 hail from India, Japan, China, Taiwan, Indonesia, the Philippines, Iran and more.

== 2015 Film Festival ==
The 2015 Festival took place July 10–19, 2015. It was the most successful to date, boasting record attendance numbers. Theeb, a collaborative effort from the UAE, Jordan and Qatar, opened the festival. The Centerpiece Presentation was Dukhtar, an affecting drama about a mother's love, which pulled in record single-screening audience record for the festival. Closing out the Festival was the crowd-pleasing Miss India America, directed by Ravi Kapoor, who flew in from Los Angeles to speak with the audience following the film.

== 2016 Film Festival ==
The 2016 festival began on September 16, 2016 and concluded 10 days later on the September 25, 2016. The festival showcased a total of 31 of the newest and most acclaimed feature-length, as well as sevenshort films. This year, the festival expanded to reach a total of 7 different venues including Frick Fine Arts, CMU McConomy Auditorium, Carnegie Museum of Art, and Cranberry Cinemas. The festival opened with the Kurdish film El Clasico, which was awarded Best Fiction Feature at the Dubai International Film Festival. Nawara, an Egyptian film set against the backdrop of the 2011 Revolution, highlighted this year's Centerpiece Presentation on Thursday, September 22 at Regent Square Theater. The festival concluded on Sunday, September 25 at Melwood Screening Room in Oakland. The Closing Night Film was the Indian film, Parched, which took home the Grand Jury Prize at the Indian Film Festival of Los Angeles and the Impact Award at the Stockholm Film Festival. During the festival, the film Psycho Raman made its US premiere just months after making its world premiere at Cannes.

== 2017 Film Festival ==
The 2017 festival took place September 15–24, 2017. The festival showcased a total of 32 feature-length films, as well as 10 short films. The films screened at six venues including Carnegie Museum of Art, Cranberry Cinemas, Frick Fine Arts, Harris Theater, Melwood Screening Room, and Waterworks Cinema. Fourteen countries were represented this year, from cultural powerhouses India and Japan to nations with smaller film industries, like Nepal and Malaysia. The Festival opened with the Indian Film, A Death in the Gunj, which is the feature debut for award-winning actress, Konkona Sen Sharma, as both writer and director of this Indian dramatic thriller. The Closing Night Film was the Indian film, Hotel Salvation, which took home India's National Film Award - Special Jury Award/Special Mention (Feature Film) in 2017. Of the 2017 Gala, held on September 17, founder Harish Saluja said, “This is by far our best gala yet". The 2017 Silk Screen Gala was also named “Best Event on the Rise” by the Pittsburgh Post-Gazette.

== 2018 Film Festival ==
The 2018 festival was held between September 21, 2018 and September 30, 2018. The 2018 Gala was held on September 21, 2018. This was the final festival before the organization shut down.

== Silk Sound ==
Silk Screen's reach extends to the music industry as well. The non-profit produced an Asian fusion jazz ensemble called Silk Sound in 2014. The band's distinct sound combines traditional Asian classical music with modern American jazz to create gorgeous, unique harmonies. The group's debut album, Sun Gate, was released in January 2015. Among other live performances, Silk Sound was the featured musical act at Pittsburgh Mayor Bill Peduto's inauguration celebration.
