= In My Mother's Arms =

- Directed by: Atia Al Daradji; Mohamed Al-Daradji
- Written by: Atia Al Daradji; Mohamed Al-Daradji
- Produced by: Isabelle Stead Atia Al Daradji Mohamed Al-Daradji
- Starring: Husham Al Thabe Saif Slaam Mohamed Wael
- Edited by: Mohamed Jabara Ian Watson
- Music by: Glenn Freemantle
- Release date: September 13, 2011
- Running time: 85 minutes
- Countries: Iraq; Netherlands; UK
- Language: Arabic

In My Mother's Arms (Fi Ahdan Ummi) is a 2011 Iraqi film. The film is written and directed by Atia Al Daradji and Mohamed Al-Daradji, who are also the co-producers with Isabelle Stead. It stars Husham Al Thabe, Saif Slaam and Mohamed Wael. The film was screened at the Toronto International Film Festival in 2011.

== Plot ==
Stead and Draadji filmed Husham Al Thabe Theas as he undertook a nine-month journey to support 32 orphans, and portrays the day-to-day life that these orphans lead in the small house that Husham rents and runs with donations from volunteers who share his intent. It shows the children laughing and playing, and it shows their times of despair. It portrays the troubles that Husham goes through in order to run his orphanage while supporting his own family. His troubles multiply when the house-owner asks Husham to leave the house. “In My Mother’s Arms” is the theme song of the film and is sung by the children to distract themselves from their misery.

== Cast ==
- Husham Al Thabe as Husham Al Thabe
- Saif Slaam as Saif Slaam
- Mohamed Wael as Mohamed Wael

=== Political Context ===
After the fall of the Saddam regime and the American invasion of Iraq, hundreds of thousands of orphans had nowhere to go. Husham took it upon himself to support some of them. Living in the dangerous Sadr district of Baghdad, Husham's experience is portrayed through this film.

== The filmmakers ==
Atia Al Daradji and Mohamed Al-Daradji were born in Baghdad and both have degrees from the Netherlands. They have made several films including Ahlaam (2006), Son of Babylon (2010) and Iraq: War, Love, God, Madness (2010). For the film Son of Babylon, Mohamed Al-Daradji was named Middle East Filmmaker of the Year in 2010.

== See also ==
- Mohamed Al-Daradji
- Son of Babylon
- Humanitarian Crises of the Iraq War
- Cinema of Iraq
