= List of submissions to the 80th Academy Awards for Best Foreign Language Film =

2007 Best Foreign Language Film submissions
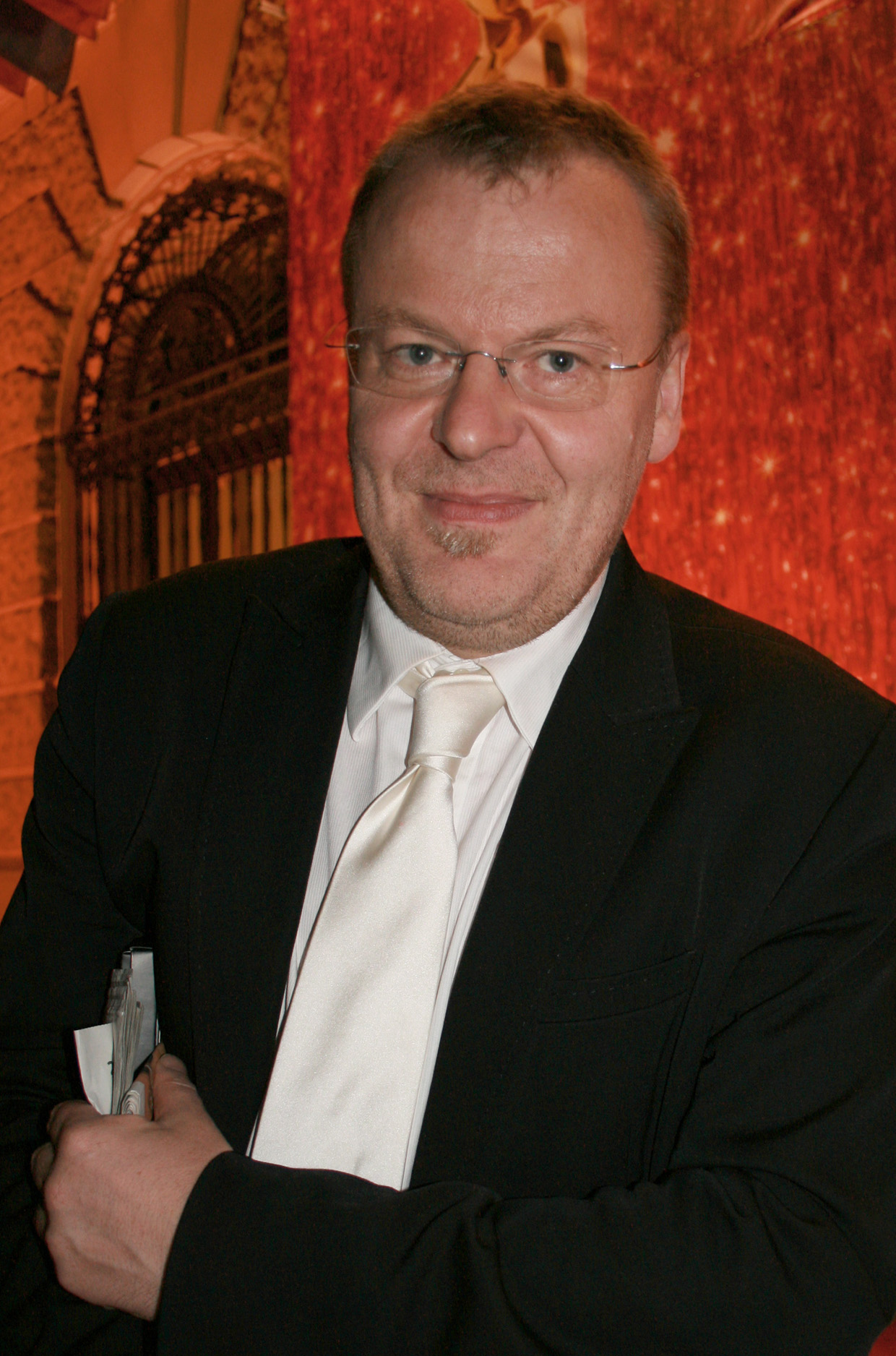
- Stefan Ruzowitzky directed The Counterfeiters, which won the year's award.

Highlights
- Oscar winner: (Austria) The Counterfeiters
- Submissions: 64
- Debuts: 2
- Total eligible: 63

This is a list of submissions to the 80th Academy Awards for the Best Foreign Language Film. The Academy of Motion Picture Arts and Sciences (AMPAS) has invited the film industries of various countries to submit their best film for the Academy Award for Best Foreign Language Film every year since the award was created in 1956. The award is presented annually by the Academy to a feature-length motion picture produced outside the United States that contains primarily non-English dialogue. The Foreign Language Film Award Committee oversees the process and reviews all the submitted films.

For the 80th Academy Awards, the submitted motion pictures must have first been released theatrically in their respective countries between 1 October 2006 and 30 September 2007. The deadline for submissions to the Academy was 1 October 2007. 64 countries submitted films, and 63 were found to be eligible by AMPAS and screened for voters. Azerbaijan and Ireland submitted films for the first time. After the 9-film shortlist was announced on 15 January 2008, the five nominees were announced on 22 January 2008.

Austria won the award for the first time with The Counterfeiters by Stefan Ruzowitzky.

== Submissions ==
Submitting country	Film title used in nomination	Original title	Language(s)	Director(s)	Result
Argentina	XXY		Spanish	Lucía Puenzo	Not nominated
Australia	The Home Song Stories	意	Cantonese, English, Mandarin	Tony Ayres	Not nominated
Austria	The Counterfeiters	Die Fälscher	German, Russian, English, Hebrew	Stefan Ruzowitzky	Won Academy Award
Azerbaijan	Caucasia	Qafqaz	Azerbaijani, Russian	Farid Gumbatov	Not nominated
Bangladesh	On the Wings of Dreams	স্বপ্নডانায়	North Central Bengali	Golam Rabbany Biplob	Not nominated
Belgium	Ben X		Flemish, Dutch	Nic Balthazar	Not nominated
Bolivia	The Andes Don't Believe In God	Los Andes no creen en Dios	Spanish	Antonio Eguino	Disqualified
Bosnia and Herzegovina	It's Hard to be Nice	Teško je biti fin	Bosnian, Japanese	Srđan Vuletić	Not nominated
Brazil	The Year My Parents Went on Vacation	O Ano em que Meus Pais Saíram de Férias	Brazilian Portuguese, Yiddish, Hebrew	Cao Hamburger	Made shortlist
Bulgaria	Warden of the Dead	Пазачът на мъртвите	Bulgarian	Iliyan Simeonov	Not nominated
Canada	Days of Darkness	L'âge des ténèbres	French	Denys Arcand	Made shortlist
Chile	Padre nuestro		Spanish	Rodrigo Sepúlveda	Not nominated
China	The Knot	云水谣	Mandarin, Taiwanese Hokkien	Yin Li	Not nominated
Colombia	Satanás		Spanish	Andi Baiz	Not nominated
Croatia	Armin		Bosnian, Croatian, German, English	Ognjen Sviličić	Not nominated
Cuba	The Silly Age	La edad de la peseta	Spanish	Pavel Giroud	Not nominated
Czech Republic	I Served the King of England	Obsluhoval jsem anglického krále	Czech, German, French, English, Slovak, Hungarian, Italian, Spanish, Russian, Korean	Jiri Menzel	Not nominated
Denmark	The Art of Crying	Kunsten at græde i kor	South Jutlandic	Peter Schønau Fog	Not nominated
Egypt	In the Heliopolis Flat	في شقة مصر الجديدة	Arabic	Mohamed Khan	Not nominated
Estonia	The Class	Klass	Estonian	Ilmar Raag	Not nominated
Finland	A Man's Job	Miehen työ	Finnish	Aleksi Salmenperä	Not nominated
France	Persepolis		French, English, Persian, German	Vincent Paronnaud and Marjane Satrapi	Not nominated
Georgia	The Russian Triangle	რუსული სამკუთხედი / Русский треугольник	Russian	Aleko Tsabadze	Not nominated
Germany	The Edge of Heaven	Auf der anderen Seite	German, Turkish, English	Fatih Akin	Not nominated
Greece	Eduart	Έντουαρτ	Albanian, Greek, German, English	Angeliki Antoniou	Not nominated
Hong Kong	Exiled	放逐	Cantonese, Mandarin	Johnnie To	Not nominated
Hungary	Taxidermia		Hungarian, English, Russian	György Pálfi	Not nominated
Iceland	Jar City	Mýrin	Icelandic	Baltasar Kormakur	Not nominated
India	Eklavya: The Royal Guard	एकलव्य	Hindi	Vidhu Vinod Chopra	Not nominated
Indonesia	Denias, Singing on the Cloud	Denias Senandung Di Atas Awan	Indonesian, Papuan Malay	John de Rantau	Not nominated
Iran	M for Mother	میم مثل مادر	Persian, Armenian	Rasul Mollagholipour	Not nominated
Iraq	Jani Gal	ژانی گەل	Central Kurdish	Jamil Rostami	Not nominated
Ireland	Kings		Irish, English	Tommy Collins	Not nominated
Israel	Beaufort	בופור	Hebrew	Joseph Cedar	Nominated
Italy	The Unknown Woman	La sconosciuta	Italian, Ukrainian	Giuseppe Tornatore	Made shortlist
Japan	I Just Didn't Do It	それでもボクはやってない	Japanese	Masayuki Suo	Not nominated
Kazakhstan	Mongol	Монгол	Mongolian, Mandarin	Sergei Bodrov	Nominated
Lebanon	Caramel	سكر بنات	Arabic, French	Nadine Labaki	Not nominated
Luxembourg	Little Secrets	Perl oder Pica	Luxembourgish	Pol Cruchten	Not nominated
(North Macedonia) Macedonia	Shadows	Сенки	Macedonian	Milčo Mančevski	Not nominated
Mexico	Silent Light	Stellet Licht	Plautdietsch	Carlos Reygadas	Not nominated
Netherlands	Duska	Душка	Dutch, Russian	Jos Stelling	Not nominated
Norway	Gone with the Woman	Tatt av kvinnen	Norwegian, English, French	Petter Naess	Not nominated
Peru	Crossing a Shadow	Una sombra al frente	Spanish	Augusto Tamayo San Román	Not nominated
Philippines	Donsol		Central Bikol, Filipino	Adolfo Alix, Jr.	Not nominated
Poland	Katyń		Polish, Russian, German	Andrzej Wajda	Nominated
Portugal	Belle toujours		French	Manoel de Oliveira	Not nominated
Puerto Rico	Lovesickness	Maldeamores	Spanish	Mariem Pérez and Carlitos Ruiz	Not nominated
Romania	4 Months, 3 Weeks and 2 Days	4 luni, 3 săptămâni şi 2 zile	Romanian	Cristian Mungiu	Not nominated
Russia	12		Russian, Chechen	Nikita Mikhalkov	Nominated
Serbia	The Trap	Клопка	Serbian	Srdan Golubović	Made shortlist
Singapore	881		Mandarin, Singaporean Hokkien, English, Cantonese	Royston Tan	Not nominated
Slovakia	Return of the Storks	Návrat bocianov	German, Slovak, Carpathian Romani, Russian	Martin Repka	Not nominated
Slovenia	Short Circuits	Kratki stiki	Slovene	Janez Lapajne	Not nominated
South Korea	Secret Sunshine	밀양	Korean	Lee Chang-dong	Not nominated
Spain	The Orphanage	El orfanato	Spanish	J. A. Bayona	Not nominated
Sweden	You, the Living	Du levande	Swedish	Roy Andersson	Not nominated
Switzerland	Late Bloomers	Die Herbstzeitlosen	Swiss German	Bettina Oberli	Not nominated
Taiwan	Island Etude	練習曲	Mandarin, Taiwanese Hokkien, English, Lithuanian	Chen Hwai-en	Not nominated
Thailand	King of Fire	ตำนานสมเด็จพระนเรศวรมหาราช	Thai, Mon, Burmese	Chatrichalerm Yukol	Not nominated
Turkey	A Man's Fear of God	Takva	Turkish	Özer Kızıltan	Not nominated
Uruguay	The Pope's Toilet	El baño del Papa	Spanish, Uruguayan Portuguese	Cesar Charlone and Enrique Fernandez	Not nominated
Venezuela	Postcards from Leningrad	Postales de Leningrado	Spanish	Mariana Rondon	Not nominated
Vietnam	The White Silk Dress	Áo lụa Hà Đông	Vietnamese, French, Cantonese	Lưu Huỳnh	Not nominated

== Notes ==
- Bolivia submitted The Andes Don't Believe In God by Antonio Eguino for review by the Academy, but it did not appear on the list of official submissions.
- India's selection was highly controversial, as Eklavya: The Royal Guard by Vidhu Vinod Chopra was the target of a lawsuit alleging that the selection committee was tied to the production staff of Eklavya; however, India retained the film as its submission.
- Israel originally submitted The Band's Visit by Eran Kolirin, but the Academy determined that Israel's first submission contained too much English dialogue for the film to meet Academy requirements, and Israel submitted Beaufort by Joseph Cedar as a replacement.
- Taiwan originally submitted Lust, Caution by Ang Lee, but the Academy determined that Taiwan's initial submission had insufficient Taiwanese participation to be considered a valid entry under Academy rules, and Taiwan submitted Island Etude by Chen Hwai-en as a replacement.
- (United Kingdom) The British Academy of Film and Television Arts was subject to criticism for not submitting the Scottish Gaelic-language Seachd: The Inaccessible Pinnacle by Simon David Miller or Welsh-language Calon Gaeth by Ashley Way.
- The Academy engendered controversy with its selections, notably the omission of France's Persepolis by Vincent Paronnaud and Marjane Satrapi, the winner of the Jury Prize at the 2007 Cannes Film Festival, and Romania's 4 Months, 3 Weeks and 2 Days by Cristian Mungiu, which had won the Palme d'Or at the same Cannes Film Festival.
