= Anna Javorková =

Slovak actress

- Born: 8 October 1952 (age 73); Ružomberok, Czechoslovakia (now Slovakia)
- Occupation: Actress
- Years active: 1974–present

Anna Javorková (born 8 October 1952) is a Slovak actress. Javorková studied at the Academy of Performing Arts in Bratislava (VŠMU), joining the Slovak National Theatre in 1974. At the 2013 DOSKY Awards she won in the category of Best Actress, for her performances as Clytemnestra in the play Oresteia at the Slovak National Theatre in Bratislava.

== Selected filmography ==
- One Silver Piece (1976)
- Mesto tieňov (television, 2008)
- Odsúdené (television, 2009)
- Rex (television, 2017)
