= Odsúdené =

Czech-Slovak television series

- Genre: Drama
- Written by: Zdeněk Zapletal
- Directed by: Peter Bebjak
- Starring: Zuzana Mauréry; Hana Vagnerová; Vica Kerekes; Elena Podzámska; Anna Javorková; Pavel Kříž; Pavol Višňovský
- Opening theme: "Welcome to Heartbreak"
- Countries of origin: Czech Republic; Slovakia
- Original languages: Czech; Slovak
- No. of seasons: 3
- No. of episodes: 86

Production
- Running time: 50 mins
- Production companies: TV JOJ; TV Barrandov

Original release
- Release: 1 September 2009 – 16 December 2010

Odsúdené (The Sentenced) is a Slovak-Czech drama television series which aired between 2009 and 2010 on the Slovak station TV JOJ and the Czech station TV Barrandov. It ran for three seasons, with a total of 86 episodes. Each episode was approximately 50 minutes long.

== Background ==
The show, co-produced by TV JOJ and TV Barrandov, premiered on 1 September 2009 and ended on 16 December 2010.

== Synopsis ==
The show is set in a women's prison. The main character is Eva Kollárová (Zuzana Maurery), who, fleeing her husband, kills another driver while under the influence of alcohol, and almost causes the death of her own son, who ends up in a coma. She is sentenced to three years in a medium-security prison. Eva adapts to her new environment while trying not to lose her dignity.

First season

The first season reveals that the person Eva killed in the accident was actually hired by her husband to kill her in order to receive a life insurance settlement. Eva's lawyer tries to obtain a retrial for her. Meanwhile, Eva is accused and eventually convicted of killing a fellow inmate, who died of a drug overdose. This increases the length of her overall sentence.

Second season

In the second season, Eva gradually adapts to her new living condition. The inmate who caused the drug overdose she was previously convicted of comes clean, Eva is exonerated, and gets a chance at parole. She is allowed a one-day release from prison and becomes pregnant with her lawyer, with whom she has become close.

Third season

Eva's pregnancy is the major theme of the third and last season of Odsúdené. She tries to keep her condition a secret for as long as possible. However, during a fight in the showers, the truth is revealed and an investigation begins to reveal the child's father, as the prison guards fall under suspicion. Eva tries to protect her lawyer, who is at risk of losing his bar license. The prison warden eventually finds out the truth, however, and Eva's lawyer is disbarred. Eva gives birth to a healthy daughter and her sentence is suspended for twelve months. Her probation officer eventually proposes a complete pardon, which is granted in the end.

== Cast and characters ==
- Zuzana Mauréry as Eva Kollárová
- Gabriela Dzuríková as Edita "Magorka" Beňová, fellow prison inmate
- Hana Vagnerová as "Barbie", fellow prison inmate
- Vica Kerekes as "Maďarka", fellow prison inmate
- Elena Podzámska as "Grófka", fellow prison inmate
- Anna Javorková as "Anjel", fellow prison inmate
- Pavel Kříž as Aleš Bílek, prison director
- Pavol Višňovský as Dávid Typolt, Eva's lawyer
