= Short Circuits (film) =

2006 Slovene film

Short Circuits (Slovene: Kratki stiki) is a 2006 Slovene film directed by Janez Lapajne. It was Slovenia's submission to the 80th Academy Awards for the Academy Award for Best Foreign Language Film, but was not accepted as a nominee.

== See also ==
- List of submissions to the 80th Academy Awards for Best Foreign Language Film
