= Hanging Gardens (2022 film) =

- Promotional release poster
- Directed by: Ahmed Yassin Al Daradji
- Screenplay by: Ahmed Yassin Al Daradji; Margaret Glover
- Produced by: Huda al Kadhimi; Margaret Glover; May Odeh; Maytham Jbara
- Starring: Jawad Al Shakarji; Akram Mazen Ali; Wissam Diyaa; Hussain Muhammad Jalil
- Cinematography: Duraid Munajim
- Edited by: Kamal El Mallakh
- Music by: Suad Bushnaq
- Production companies: Odeh Films; Purattu Films
- Release date: September 9, 2022 (Italy)
- Running time: 117 minutes
- Countries: Iraq; Palestine; Saudi Arabia; Egypt; United Kingdom
- Language: Arabic

Hanging Gardens (Arabic: جنائن معلقة, romanized: Janain mualaqa) is a 2022 drama film directed by Ahmed Yassin Al Daradji who co-wrote the screenplay with Margaret Glover. It is a co-production between Iraq, Palestine, Saudi Arabia, Egypt and the United Kingdom.

The film premiered in the Horizons section at the 79th Venice International Film Festival, and was the first Iraqi film ever to be selected by the Venice Festival. It was later awarded best film at the 2022 Red Sea International Film Festival. It was selected as the Iraqi entry for the Best International Feature Film at the 96th Academy Awards.

== Premise ==
In Baghdad’s city dump (ironically nicknamed The Hanging Gardens) As’ad, a 12-year old boy, finds a sex doll, left by the American soldiers during the Invasion of Iraq.

== Cast ==
- Wissam Diyaa
- Jawad Al Shakarji
- Hussain Muhammad Jalil as As’ad
- Akram Mazen Ali

== See also ==
- List of submissions to the 96th Academy Awards for Best International Feature Film
- List of Iraqi submissions for the Academy Award for Best International Feature Film
