= Caucasia (film) =

Caucasia (Azerbaijani: Qafqaz) is a 2007 Azerbaijani film directed by Farid Gumbatov. It was Azerbaijan's submission to the 80th Academy Awards for the Academy Award for Best Foreign Language Film, but was not accepted as a nominee.

== See also ==
- Cinema of Azerbaijan
- List of submissions to the 80th Academy Awards for Best Foreign Language Film
