= Snake Fang =

1990 film

Snake Fang دندان مار
- DVD cover
- Directed by: Masoud Kimiai
- Written by: Masoud Kimiai
- Produced by: Majid Modaresi& Mohammad Mehdi Dadgoo
- Cinematography: Iraj Sadeghpour
- Edited by: Mehdi Rajaeian
- Music by: Fariborz Lachini
- Release date: 1990
- Running time: 110 minutes
- Country: Iran
- Language: Persian
- Budget: Kadr Film

Snake Fang (Persian: دندان مار, romanized: Dandān-e Mār) is a 1990 Iranian war film directed by Masoud Kimiai. It was entered into the 41st Berlin International Film Festival where it won an Honourable Mention.

It was also nominated for the best feature film at the 1991 Chicago International Film Festival.

== Cast ==
- Golchehre Sajadieh as Siwar
- Ahmad Najafi as Ahmad
- Faramarz Sedighi as Reza
- Hassan Rafi'i
- Fariba Kowsari as Fatemeh
- Jalal Moghadam
- Nosratallah Karimi
- Saeid Pirdoost
- Nersi Gorgia
- Mohammad Abdollahi
- Abbas Ghajar
- Reza Khandan
- Mohammad Vali Ahmadloo
- Shahed Ahmadloo
- Hossein Memarzadeh

== Awards ==
- Honourable Mention 41st Berlin International Film Festival 1991
- Special Jury Prize Montreal World Film Festival 1992
