= Baghdad Messi =

- Promotional release poster
- Directed by: Sahim Omar Kalifa
- Screenplay by: Kobe Van Steenberghe
- Story by: Kobe Van Steenberghe; Ruth Mallaerts
- Based on: Baghdad Messi by Sahim Omar Kalifa; Kobe Van Steenberghe
- Produced by: Hendrik Verthé; Kobe Van Steenberghe
- Starring: Ahmed Mohammed Abdullah
- Cinematography: Anton Mertens
- Edited by: Dorith Vinken
- Music by: Frédéric Vercheval
- Production companies: A Team Productions; 10.80 Films; Column Film; Mitos Film
- Distributed by: The Searchers
- Release dates: January 28, 2023 (Filmfestival Oostende); April 12, 2023 (Belgium); August 3, 2023 (The Netherlands)
- Running time: 88 minutes
- Countries: Belgium; Netherlands; Germany; Iraq
- Languages: Arabic; Kurdish
- Box office: $40,528

Baghdad Messi (Arabic: ميسي بغداد) is a 2023 drama film directed by Sahim Omar Kalifa, with a screenplay by Kobe Van Steenberghe from a story by Kobe Van Steenberghe and Ruth Mallaerts. It is about an Iraqi boy who, after losing his leg in a terrorist attack, fights to continue pursuing his passion for soccer. It is based on the 2012 short film of the same name by the same director. It is a co-production between Belgium, the Netherlands, Germany and Iraq.

It was selected as the Iraqi entry for the Best International Feature Film at the 97th Academy Awards, but was not nominated.

== Synopsis ==
Hamoudi is an 11-year-old boy who loves soccer and dreams of reaching the level of his idol, Lionel Messi. One day he is the victim of an attempted suicide attack in Iraq, which causes him to lose a leg. While his parents do everything they can to protect the family, Hamoudi is determined to fight to make his shattered dream come true.

== Cast ==
- Ahmed Mohammed Abdullah as Hamoudi
- Christian Renson as John
- Zahraa Ghandour as Salwa
- Atheer Adel
- Errol Trotman-Harewood as Duncan
- Atheer Adel
- Safa Najem
- Adil Abdulrahman
- Hussein Hassan as Bahoz
- Ravand Zaid as Soldier 1
- Saman Mustefa as Soldier 2
- Bangen Ali as Check Point Soldier

== Production ==
Principal photography took place in 2021 in the Kurdistan Region, Iraq, the same location where the short film was filmed.

== Release ==
=== Festivals ===
It had its world premiere on January 28, 2023, at the Ostend Film Festival, and was later screened on March 5, 2023, at the Luxembourg City Film Festival, on June 10, 2023, at the 25th Shanghai International Film Festival, and on April 25, 2024, at the Malmo Arab Film Festival.

=== Theatrical ===
It was commercially released on April 12, 2023, in Belgian theaters, and on August 3, 2023, in Dutch theaters.

== Accolades ==
| Year | Award / Festival | Category | Recipient | Result | Ref. |
|---|---|---|---|---|---|
| 2023 | Ostend Film Festival | Look Prize for Best Film | Baghdad Messi | Nominated | |
| 2023 | Ostend Film Festival | Ensor - Best Director | Sahim Omar Kalifa | Nominated | |
| 2023 | Ostend Film Festival | Ensor - Best Cinematography | Anton Mertens | Nominated | |
| 2023 | 25th Shanghai International Film Festival | Audience Choice Award for Film | Baghdad Messi | Nominated | |
| 2023 | 25th Shanghai International Film Festival | Media Choice Award for Film | Baghdad Messi | Nominated | |
| 2023 | SCHLiNGEL - International Film Festival for Children and Young Audience | Award of the Junior Jury | Baghdad Messi | Won | |
| 2023 | 26th Arpa International Film Festival | Best Feature Narrative Film | Baghdad Messi | Won | |
| 2023 | 26th Arpa International Film Festival | Best Director | Sahim Omar Kalifa | Won | |
| 2023 | 26th Arpa International Film Festival | Best Screenplay | Kobe Van Steenberghe | Won | |

== See also ==
- List of submissions to the 97th Academy Awards for Best International Feature Film
- List of Iraqi submissions for the Academy Award for Best International Feature Film
