= AeroMobil s.r.o. AeroMobil =

Slovak roadable aircraft

AeroMobil
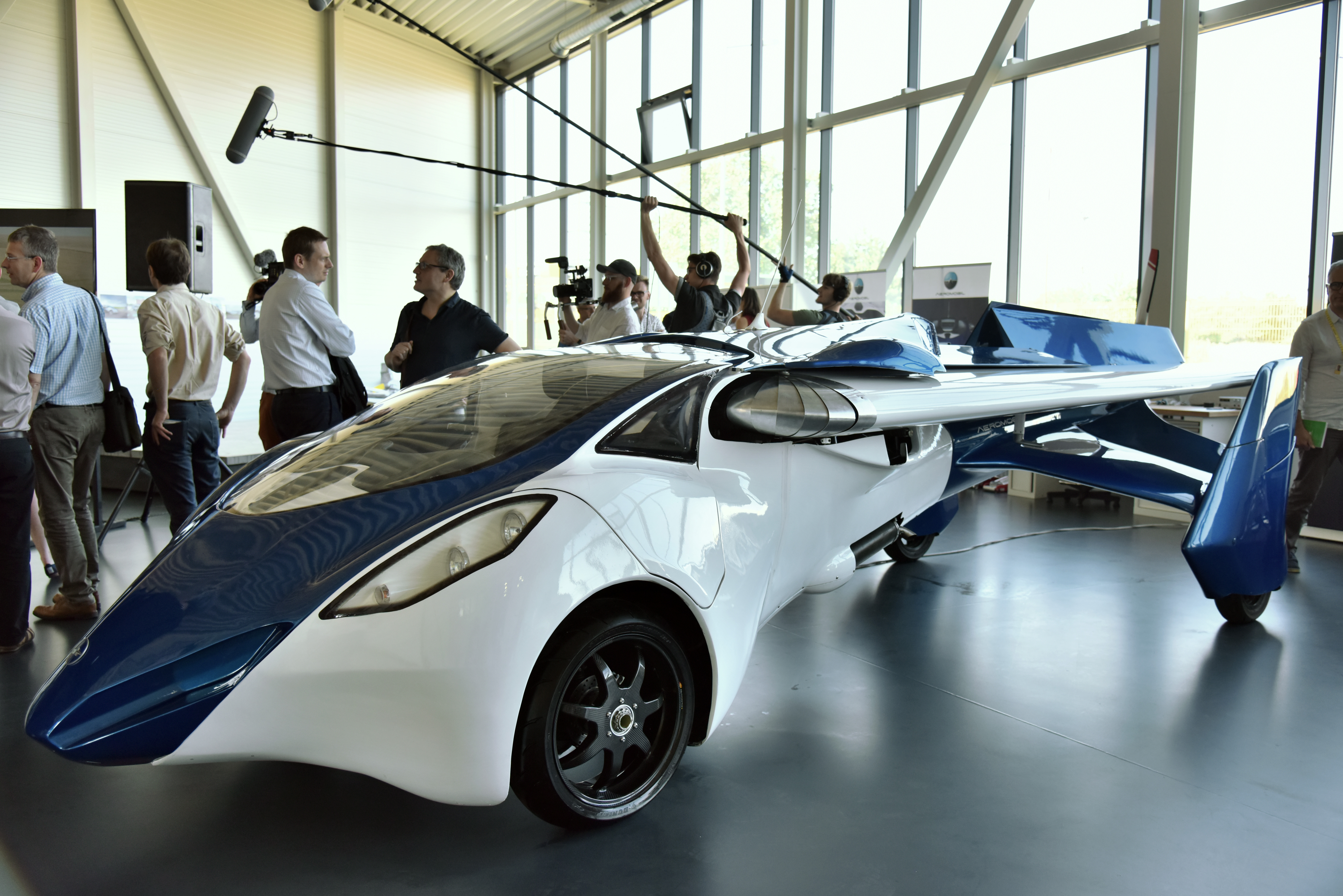
- AeroMobil 3.0 on display on 2 July 2016.

General information
- Type: Roadable aircraft
- National origin: Slovakia
- Manufacturer: AeroMobil s.r.o.
- Status: In development

History
- Manufactured: 1990–Present
- First flight: October 2014

The AeroMobil s.r.o. AeroMobil is a prototype roadable aircraft, designed by Štefan Klein and first flown in 2013. The aircraft was going be produced by Slovak company AeroMobil s.r.o.

AeroMobil s.r.o. company co-founder and CEO Juraj Vaculík indicated in March 2015 that the vehicle is intended for "wealthy supercar buyers and flight enthusiasts". Aeromobil unveiled the production version of the vehicle in April 2017 and announced that it would be available for preorder before the end of 2017.

As of February 20, 2023, AeroMobil failed to acquire new financing and closed down. Total investments amounted to about €25 million.

== Design and development ==
The prototype was conceived as a vehicle that can be converted from an automobile to an aircraft. The version 2.5 proof-of-concept took 20 years to develop, and first flew in 2013. The prototype was constructed by the AeroMobil Team based in Bratislava and led by co-founders Štefan Klein and Juraj Vaculík, advised by inventor Dean Kamen.

As of 2013, there have been four developmental versions of the Aeromobil, 1.0, 2.0, 2.5 and 3.0, with earlier versions lacking folding wings, while later versions have folding wings and fins around the wheels. Version 2.5 was first exhibited in Montreal at the SAE AeroTech Congress and Exhibition. Version 3.0 was introduced at the Pioneers Festival 2014 in Vienna, Austria, and flew in October 2014. The designers intend to include a ballistic parachute.

In 2014 the company said there is no date for a finished product, but in 2015, after the crash of the prototype, they hoped for deliveries by 2018.

On 6 April 2016, the company raised €3 million ($3.2 million US) to help fund the production and demonstration of a new vehicle. This round of funding comes from individual investor Patrick Hessel, a founder of c2i. The company, c2i, is a maker of aerospace and automotive parts constructed from composite material.

On 20 April 2017, AeroMobil s.r.o. unveiled the production model of the vehicle at Top Marques Monaco in Monte Carlo, Monaco, and announced that it would begin to take preorders for a "limited first edition" of it before the end of 2017. The first edition was to consist of no more than 500 vehicles, and the first 25 ordered were planned as a "Founders Edition" with "series-specific product content along with an expanded benefits package" with "details to be announced separately."

== Variants ==
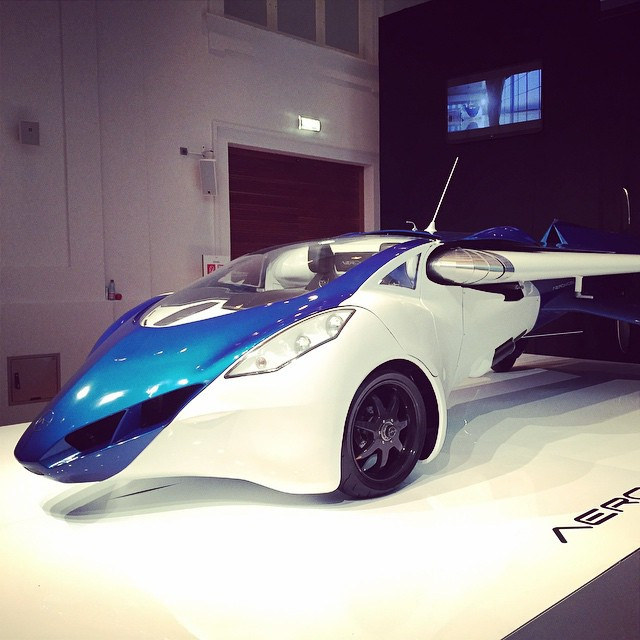
AeroMobil 3.0 in 2014

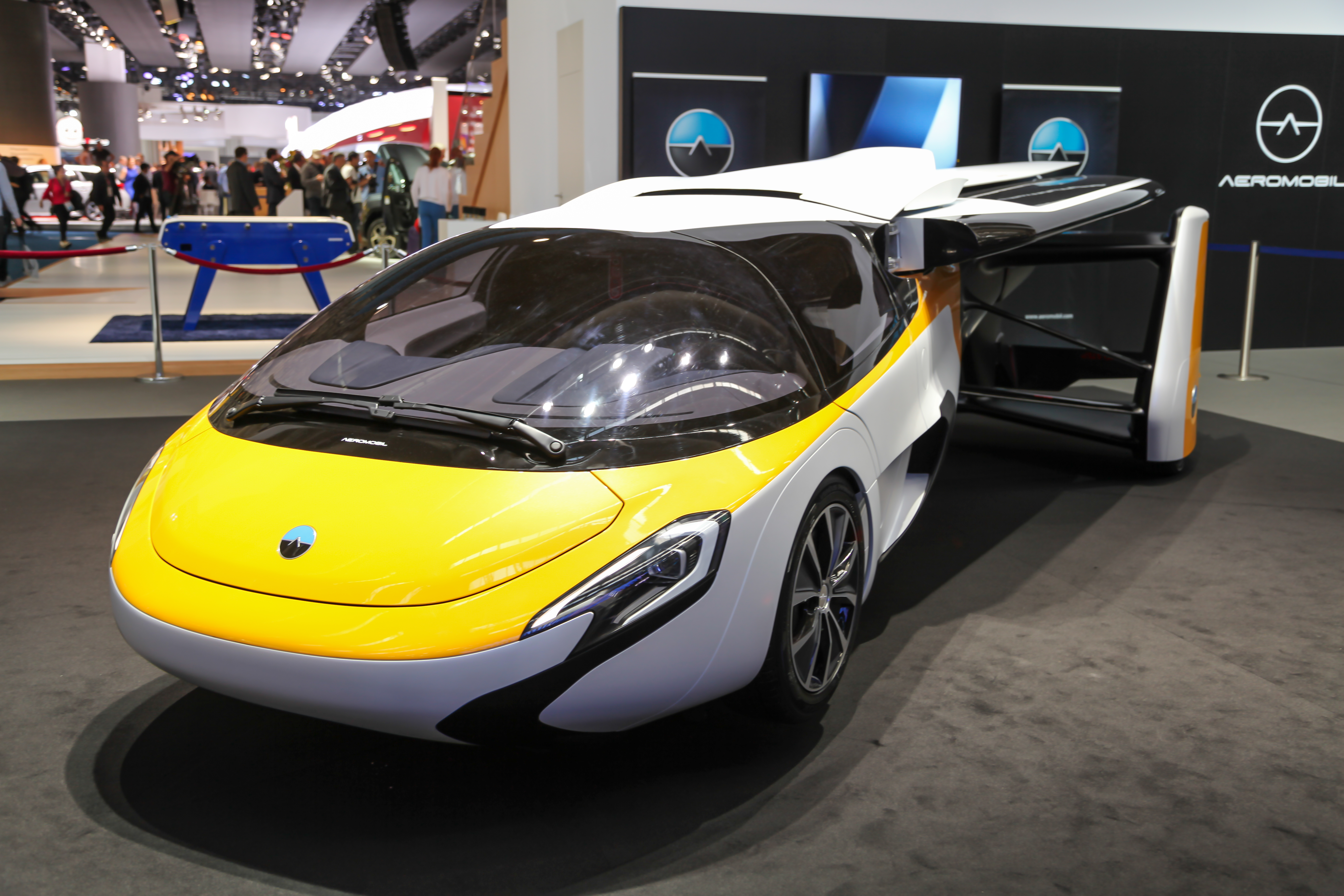
AeroMobil 4.0 in 2017

AeroMobil 1.0 (1990–94)
Initial concept vehicle
AeroMobil 2.0 (1995-2010)
Concept development
AeroMobil 2.5 (2010-2013)
The pre-prototype of the Aeromobil concept
AeroMobil 3.0 (2014-2017)
Further development of the concept. First publicly shown in October 2014 and crashed on 8 May 2015. Powered by a Rotax 912S engine, it was constructed with a steel frame covered in carbon fibre.
Aeromobil 4.0 (2017-)
Hybrid power based on a Subaru boxer engine. 300 hp gasoline or 110 hp electric.

== Accidents ==
On 8 May 2015 the AeroMobil 3.0 prototype crashed at Nitra Airport near Janíkovce, during a test flight. It entered a spin and the ballistic parachute was deployed. The aircraft crashed on descending and suffered major damage. The pilot, Stefan Klein, received only minor injuries and was able to walk away from the aircraft. In June, 2015, the company indicated that a new prototype was being developed.

== Specifications (AeroMobil 3.0) ==
Data from Manufacturer

General characteristics

- Crew: two
- Capacity: two passengers
- Length: 6 m (19 ft 8 in)
- Wingspan: 8.32 m (27 ft 4 in) wings extended
- Width: 2.24 m (7 ft 4 in) wings folded
- Empty weight: 600 kg (1,323 lb)
- Powerplant: 1 × Rotax 912 four cylinder horizontally-opposed liquid and air-cooled piston aircraft engine, 75 kW (100 hp)

Performance

- Maximum speed: 200 km/h (120 mph, 110 kn) maximum road speed: 160 km/h (99 mph)
- Stall speed: 60 km/h (37 mph, 32 kn)
- Range: 700 km (430 mi, 380 nmi) Road range: 875 km (544 mi)
- Driving fuel consumption: 8 L/100 km (29.4 mpg_{‑US}; 35.3 mpg_{‑imp})
- Flight fuel consumption: 15 L (4.0 US gal; 3.3 imp gal) /hour

== See also ==
Aircraft of comparable role, configuration, and era

- Klein Vision AirCar sports coupe with folding wings, also developed by Klein.
- PAL-V roadable autogyro
- Terrafugia Transition sports coupe with folding wings.
