= War, Love, God, & Madness =

- Directed by: Mohamed Al-Daradji
- Release date: 2008
- Running time: 83 minutes
- Language: Arabic

War, Love, God & Madness is a documentary film directed by Mohamed Al-Daradji in 2008. It runs for 83 minutes and is based on the Iraq War. It documents the efforts of the making of the film Ahlaam in Iraq, during that war.

The documentary was originally in Arabic, although English subtitles are available.

== Reception ==
Mark Kermode of the BBC called it "an amazing and uplifting documentary, which shows precisely how dangerous shooting in Iraq can be."

Jay Weissberg, writing for Variety, said, "Visuals are often blurred, but given the dangers of filming, it’s miraculous they have so much."
