= Golchehreh Sajadiye =

Iranian actress (born 1954)

Golchehreh Sajadiye (Persian: گلچهره سجادیه, born 1954 in Arak, Iran) is an Iranian actress. She graduated in theatre from FFATU (1977), started film acting with The Crow (1977, Bahram Bayzai). In her subtle performances, she has appeared as an independent and stubborn woman. She won the prize of Best Actress for Land of the Sun (1996, A. Darvish) from the Fajr Film Festival. In 2024, Sajadieh earned a Hafez Award nomination for her performance in Homeland (2024).

== Some of her plays ==
- The Wave of the Tempest, 1981
- The Station, 1987
- Snake Fang, 1990
- The Sergeant, 1990
- The Wolf’s Trail, 1992
- The Fall, 1993
