= Krasňany =

Village and municipality in Slovakia

- Municipality
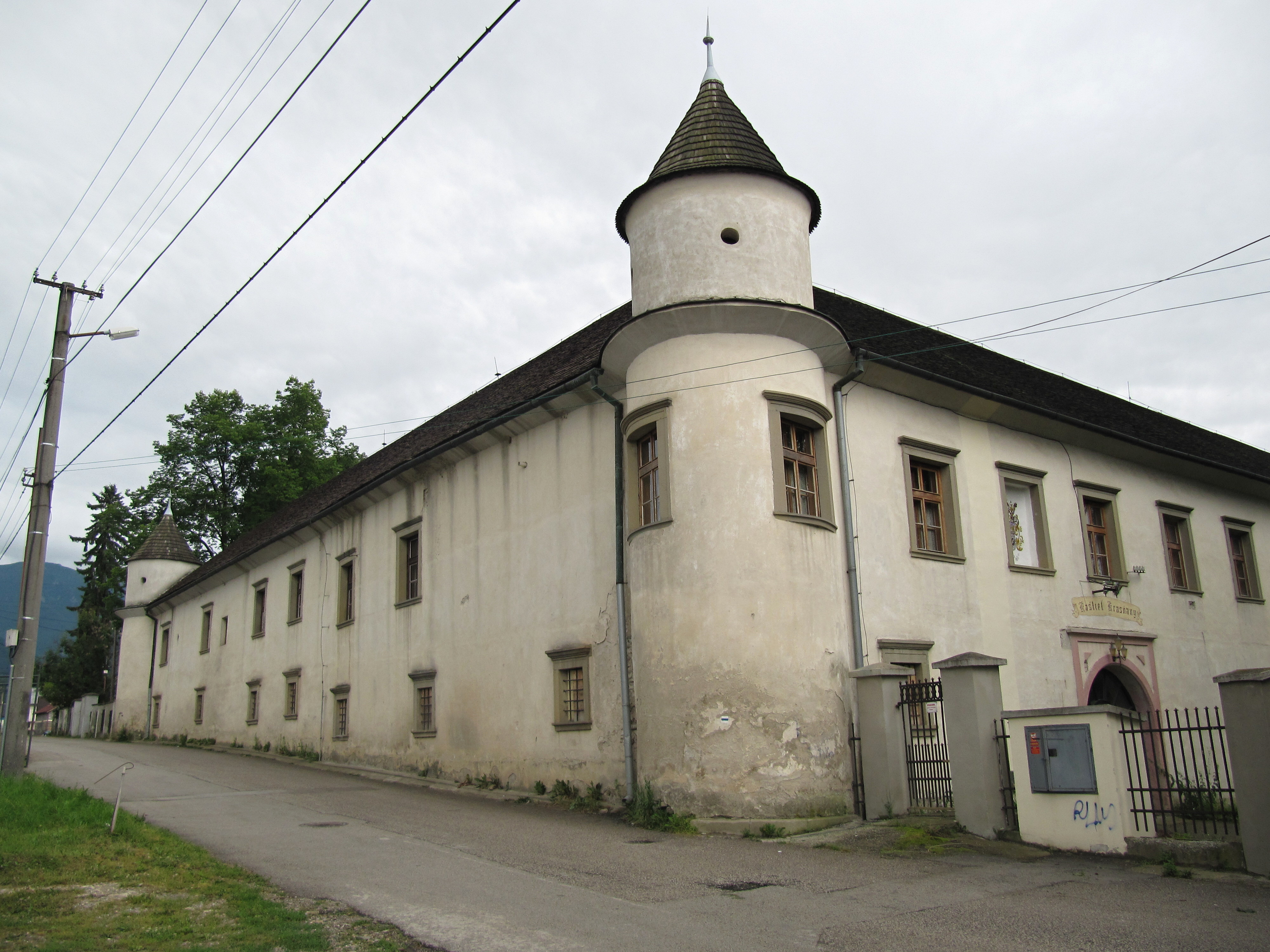

- Flag

- Location of Krasňany in the Žilina Region Location of Krasňany in Slovakia
- Coordinates: 49.22°N 18.90°E
- Country: Slovakia
- Region: Žilina Region
- District: Žilina District
- First mentioned: 1354

Area
  - Total: 15.17 km^{2} (5.86 sq mi)
- Elevation: 383 m (1,257 ft)

Population (2025)
  - Total: 1,702
- Time zone: UTC+1 (CET)
  - Summer (DST): UTC+2 (CEST)
- Postal code: 130 3
- Area code: +421 41
- Vehicle registration plate (until 2022): ZA
- Website: www.obeckrasnany.sk

Krasňany (Hungarian: Karasznyán) is a village and municipality in Žilina District in the Žilina Region of northern Slovakia.

== Etymology ==
Krasňany (Slovak) is a place in Slovakia.

== History ==
In historical records the village was first mentioned in 1354 (Karzna).

== Geography ==
The municipality lies at an altitude of 383 metres (1,257 ft) and covers an area of 15.17 km^{2} (5.86 sq mi) (2025).

== Population ==
Population statistic (10 years)
Year	1995	2005	2015	2025
Count	1122	1222	1492	1702
Difference		+8.91%	+22.09%	+14.07%

Population statistic
Year	2024	2025
Count	1669	1702
Difference		+1.97%

It has a population of 1702 people (31 December 2025).

=== Ethnicity ===
Census 2021 (1+ %)
Ethnicity	Number	Fraction
Slovak	1514	93.8%
Not found out	59	3.65%
Korean	36	2.23%
Total	1614	

In year 2021 was 1614 people by ethnicity 1514 as Slovak, 59 as Not found out, 36 as Korean, 16 as Czech, 9 as Other, 3 as Ukrainian, 3 as Russian, 3 as Hungarian, 2 as Rusyn, 2 as Polish, 1 as Jewish, 1 as Romani, 1 as Romanian, 1 as German, 1 as Iranian and 1 as English.

Note on population: The difference values of population numbers in the table "Population statistic" and in the sections "Ethnicity" & "Religion" is caused by the use of various statistical methods.

=== Religion ===
Census 2021 (1+ %)
Religion	Number	Fraction
Roman Catholic Church	1309	81.1%
None	184	11.4%
Not found out	49	3.04%
Evangelical Church	17	1.05%
Total	1614	

In year 2021 was 1614 people by religion 1309 from Roman Catholic Church, 184 from None, 49 from Not found out, 17 from Evangelical Church, 16 from Christian Congregations in Slovakia, 10 from Other and not ascertained christian church, 9 from Greek Catholic Church, 6 from Eastern Orthodox Church, 4 from Old Catholic Church, 3 from Other, 3 from Buddhism, 3 from Ad hoc movements and 1 from Paganism and natural spirituality.
