= Vladimír Černý =

Personal information
- Born: 27 April 1926 Bratislava, Czechoslovakia
- Died: 30 October 2016 (aged 90)

Sport
- Sport: Modern pentathlon

Vladimír Černý (27 April 1926 – 30 October 2016) was a Slovak modern pentathlete. He competed for Czechoslovakia at the 1956 Summer Olympics.
