= El clásico (film) =

2015 film

- Film poster
- Directed by: Halkawt Mustafa
- Written by: Halkawt Mustafa
- Starring: Wrya Ahmed; Dana Ahmes
- Release dates: 9 December 2015 (Dubai IFF); 26 February 2016 (Norway)
- Running time: 95 minutes
- Countries: Kurdistan; Norway
- Language: Kurdish
- Box office: $51,540

El clásico (Sorani Kurdish: ئێل کلاسیکۆ) is a 2015 Kurdish-Norwegian drama film written and directed by Halkawt Mustafa. It was selected as the kurdish entry for the Best Foreign Language Film at the 89th Academy Awards but was not nominated.

== Cast ==
- Wrya Ahmed as Alan
- Dana Ahmed as Shirwan
- Kamaran Raoof as Jalal
- Rozhin Sharifi as Gona

== See also ==
- List of submissions to the 89th Academy Awards for Best Foreign Language Film
- List of Iraqi submissions for the Academy Award for Best Foreign Language Film
- Kurdish cinema
