= Isabelle Stead =

Film director, producer, activist

Isabelle Stead (born 8 October in Leeds, United Kingdom) is a British film director, producer and activist.

In 2008, Stead became a Sundance fellow and alumni.

In 2010 Stead was selected by the British Council as the UK Producer on the Move for Cannes International Film Festival. Stead produced Son of Babylon; the film screened at Sundance and Berlin Film Festivals and received the Amnesty and Peace Prize, followed by a British Independent Film Award. The film was selected as Iraq's official entry for the Best Foreign Language Film at the 83rd Academy Awards.

In 2011 Stead produced a documentary In My Mother's Arms; it premièred at the Toronto International Film Festival. The film went on to win the Asia Pacific Academy Award for Best Documentary.

In 2012 Stead became a member of the Asia Pacific Motion Picture Academy of the Arts.

== Humanitarian work ==
In 2010 Stead set up the 'Iraq's missing' campaign and began lobbying for the DNA testing of mass graves in Iraq.

== Filmography ==
- 2013 - In the Sands of Babylon
- 2011 - In My Mother's Arms
- 2010 - Kosher
- 2009 - Son of Babylon
- 2005 - Ahlaam

== Awards ==
- 2010 British Independent Film Award – The Raindance Maverick Award for In the Sands of Babylon
- 2010 Amnesty International Film Award at the Berlin International Film Festival for In the Sands of Babylon
- 2010 Peace Prize at the Berlin International Film Festival for In the Sands of Babylon
- 2012 Asia Pacific Screen Award for In My Mother’s Arms
- 2013 Best Film from Arab World for In the Sands of Babylon - Abu Dhabi Film Festival
