= Astorka Korzo '90 Theatre =

Theatre in Bratislava, Slovakia

- Slovak: Divadlo Astorka Korzo '90
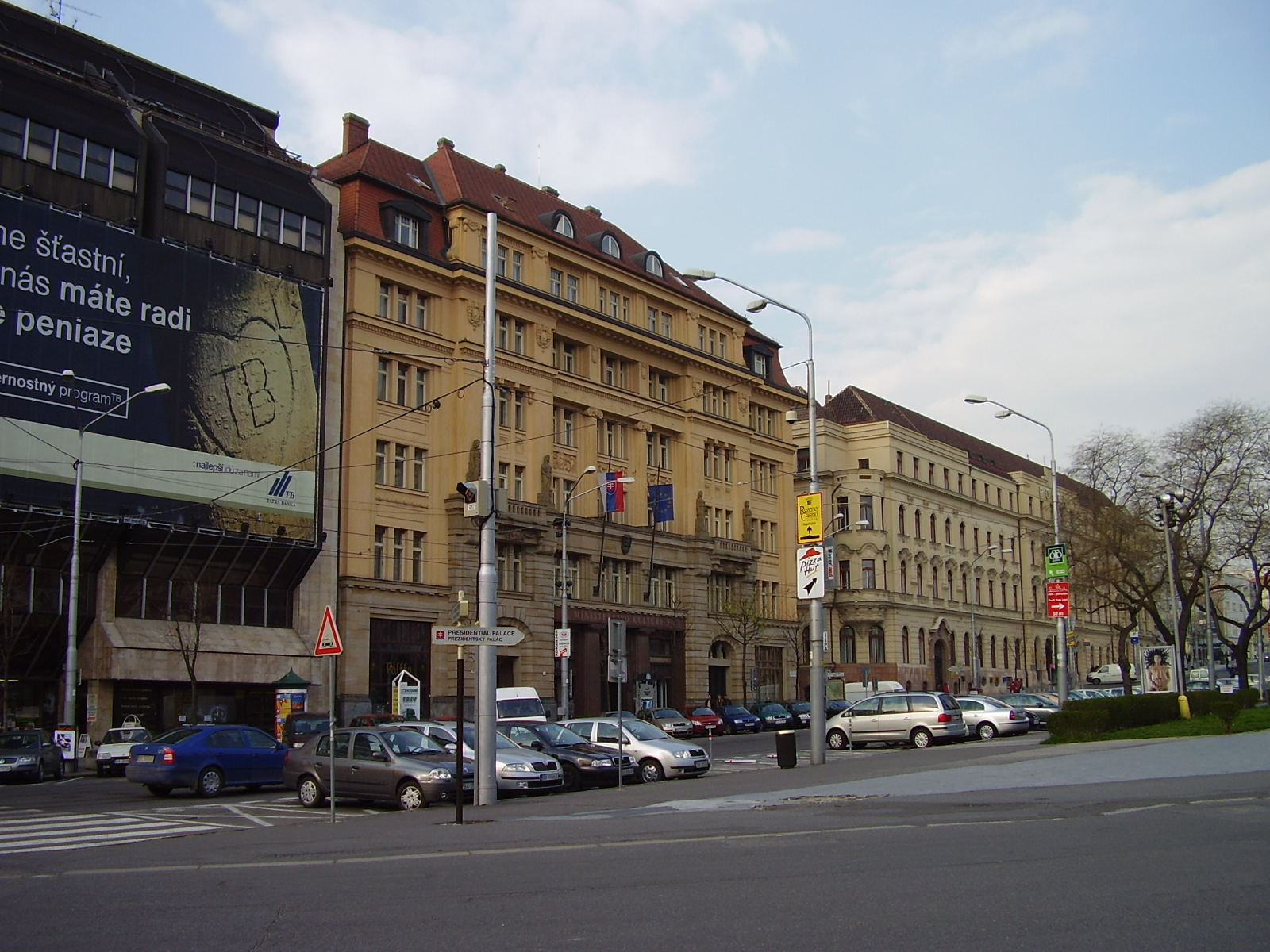
- Astorka Korzo '90 Theatre in downtown Bratislava
- Interactive map of Astorka Korzo '90 Theatre
- Address: Námestie SNP 489/33; Bratislava; Slovakia
- Coordinates: 48°8′39″N 17°6′42″E
- Type: Theatre

Construction
- Opened: 1 April 1991
- Years active: 1991–present

Website
- astorka.sk

Astorka Korzo '90 Theatre (Slovak: Divadlo Astorka Korzo '90) is a theatre in the Slovak capital of Bratislava, founded on 1 April 1991.

== History ==
The theatre was founded on 1 April 1991 under the name Korzo '90 Theatre (Divadlo Korzo '90) by actors Ľubomír Gregor and Zita Furková. Named and styled after the short-lived Divadlo na korze (1968–71), which was shuttered after Normalization, Korzo '90 launched its first theatrical season in September 1991, which included the first staging of a play by former Czechoslovak president and playwright Václav Havel after the Velvet Revolution, The Memorandum, directed by Vladimír Strnisko. In 1992, Juraj Nvota became the theatre's staff director. In 1993, the establishment's name was changed to Astorka Korzo '90 Theatre, in honour of the former Astória café, which had been located in the theatre's original location on Suchý mýto 17 from 1817 to 1945, and was one of the centres of cultural life in Bratislava at the beginning of the 20th century. In 1995, Gregor left the theatre, and Vladimír Černý became director.

Since the venue went under renovation in 2002, Astorka has been located in the former Pohraničník cinema at the Ministry of Culture building, at Slovak National Uprising Square.
