= Fariborz Lachini =

Iranian film score composer (born 1949)

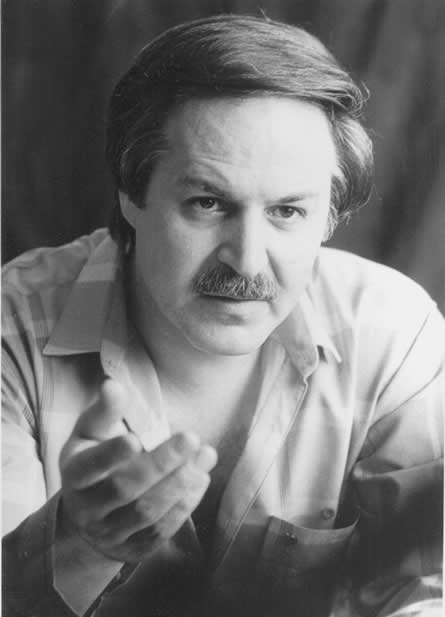

Background information
- Born: August 25, 1949 (age 77)
- Origin: Tehran, Iran
- Genre: Film scores
- Occupations: Composer, music producer
- Instruments: Piano, guitar, oboe, keyboards
- Years active: 1968–present
- Label: Lachini Media
- Website: www.lachini.com

Fariborz Lachini (Persian: فریبرز لاچینی; born August 25, 1949) is an Iranian film score composer.

== Career ==
He started his career in Iran writing music for children, creating "Avaz Faslha va Rangha" at the age of 18 which caught the attention of the royal family of the time. The title of national Iranian TV's children programming for more than two decades was one of his earlier works. Before Iran's Islamic Revolution, he also created music for some of Iran's pop icons.

After the Islamic Revolution he moved to Europe to study Musicology in the Universite de Paris – Sorbonne. It was then that his music became influenced by European styles. He returned home and created one of the most popular contemporary solo piano albums in Iran with a combination of Persian and European Romantic styles called "Paeez Talaee", also known as Golden Autumn, which has been the number-one seller for years in Iran and has attracted fans from all around the world.

He started composing for motion pictures using the skills and techniques acquired in Europe and soon earned himself recognition as a pioneer of computer technology in music in Cinema of Iran. Since 1988, he has scored for more than a hundred feature films, some of which have been showcased internationally in North America, Europe, and Asia.

== Discography ==
- 1976: Avaz Faslha Va Rangha
- 1977: Avazhaye Digar
- 1978: Afsoon
- 1989: Childish
- 1990: Pomegranate and Cane
- 1990: Snake Fang
- 1989: Golden Autumn 1
- 1991: In a Cold Winter Night
- 1991: Golden Autumn 2
- 1992: Wolf's Trail Soundtrack
- 1978: Flying
- 1994: Songs of the Sun Land
- 1998: The Tribe of Love
- 2000: For Your Birthday
- 2000: Waves of Memories 1
- 2001: Pandemonium of Fire and Water
- 2002: A Letter
- 2003: Waves of Memories 2
- 2005: Last Word of Nowadays
- 2005: Sepidar
- 2006: Best Soundtracks of Fariborz Lachini - Vol.1
- 2006: Golden Autumn 3
- 2008: Scent of Yesterday 1
- 2008: Scent of Yesterday 2
- 2008: Aida - Film Score
- 2008: Golden Autumn 4
- 2008: Requiem 1
- 2008: Golden Memories 1
- 2008: Scent of Yesterday 3
- 2009: Scent of Yesterday 4
- 2009: Scent of Yesterday 5
- 2009: Salam - Film Score
- 2009: Piano Adagios
- 2009: Christmas Piano
- 2010: Requiem 2
- 2010: Gol Afshan 1
- 2010: Gol Afshan 2
- 2010: Diar 1
- 2010: Scent of Yesterday 6
- 2010: Diar 2
- 2010: Golden Memories 2
- 2010: Scent of Yesterday 7
- 2010: La Chambre Noire - Film Score
- 2010: Diar 3
- 2010: Scent of Yesterday 8
- 2010: Scent of Yesterday 9
- 2011: Scent of Yesterday 10
- 2011: Scent of Yesterday 11
- 2011: Requiem 3

== Filmography (as composer) ==
- 1978: Baba Khaldar (Iran)
- 1979: Maryam and Mani (Iran)
- 1989: Pomegranate and Cane (Nar-o-Ney) (Iran)
- 1990: Sun's Blade (Iran)
- 1990: The Singing Cat (Iran)
- 1990: Snake Fang (Iran)
- 1991: Life's Luck (Iran)
- 1992: The Man in the Mirror (Iran)
- 1993: Once and For All (Iran)
- 1994: The Wolf's Trail (Iran)
- 1994: Jewel Mountain (Iran)
- 1994: Bluff (Iran)
- 1994: Lost Paradise (Iran)
- 1995: Utterly Cold Blooded (Iran)
- 1995: Trap (Iran)
- 1995: Born Loser (Iran)
- 1996: Javanmard (Iran)
- 1996: Unforgiven (Iran)
- 1997: Wounded (Iran)
- 1997: Claws in Dust (Iran)
- 1998: Tootia (Iran)
- 1998: Stranger (Iran)
- 1999: Youth (Iran)
- 2000: Friends (Iran)
- 2002: Disturbant (Iran)
- 2003: Poison of Honey (Iran)
- 2003: Donya (Iran)
- 2003: Black Eyes (Iran)
- 2003: Boutique (Iran)
- 2004: Non Stop to Tokyo (Iran)
- 2004: Salam (Iran/Afghanistan)
- 2005: Top of Tower (Iran)
- 2005: Redemption at 8:20 (Iran)
- 2005: Aida, I Saw Your Father Last Night (Iran/USA)
- 2005: Requiem of Snow (Iran/Iraq)
- 2005: 365 Boots on Ground (USA)
- 2006: Left Handed (Iran)
- 2006: Wedding Dinner (Iran)
- 2007: My Pink Shirt (Canada)
