= Requiem of Snow =

2005 film

- Requiem of Snow film poster
- Written by: Sholeh Shariati
- Produced by: Seyed Ahmad Miralaie
- Starring: Abdollah Ahmadi, Delnia Farajpour, Shadi Varyani, Masoud Yousefi,
- Music by: Fariborz Lachini
- Release date: 2005
- Running time: 90 min
- Language: Kurdish

Requiem of Snow is a 2005 film written by Iranian screenwriter Sholeh Shariati and directed by the Kurdish-Iranian director Jamil Rostami. It is a joint production of Iran and Iraq and the first film to represent Iraq in the Best Foreign Language Film category at the Oscars.

== Plot ==
In a village stricken by drought, as people pray for rain, a Kurdish girl trying to escape from an arranged marriage runs into a stranger.

== Awards ==
1. Best Director Award, 8th Olympia International Film Festival for Children and Young People, 2005, Greece.
2. Crystal Simorgh Award, Best Director, Fajr Film Festival, 2005, Iran.
