= Elena Podzámska =

Slovak actress (born 1972)

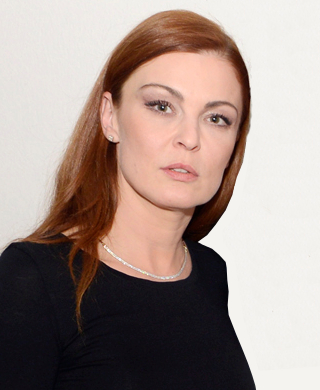
- Podzámska in 2015
- Born: 7 January 1972 (age 53); Bratislava, Czechoslovakia
- Occupation: Actress
- Years active: 1983–present

Elena Podzámska (born 7 January 1972) is a Slovak actress and dubbing actress born in Bratislava.

== Biography ==
After graduating from high school, Podzámska decided to study medicine, but after a month, she transferred to the Academy of Performing Arts (VŠMU), Department of Acting. Following her studies, she held engagements at the Slovak National Theatre and the Andrej Bagar Theatre in Nitra.

Podzámska moved to the United States after marrying her first husband, who was of American origin. They later returned to Europe and settled in Belgium, where she devoted herself to modelling and promotional work. After getting divorced, Podzámska moved back to Slovakia to pursue acting.

In 2010, she took part in season four of the Slovak television series Let's Dance.

== Selected filmography ==
=== Film ===
List of film appearances, with year, title, and role shown
Year	Title	Role	Notes
2013	Colette	Nurse	

=== Television ===
List of television appearances, with year, title, and role shown
Year	Title	Role	Notes
2008	Mesto tieňov		1 episode
2008–2009	Panelák	Nina	96 episodes
2009–2010	Odsúdené	Barbora "Grófka" Wagnerová	34 episodes
