= Jamil Rostami =

Iranian film director of Kurdish origin (born 1971)

- جمیل رستمی
- Born: Sanandaj, Kurdistan province, Iran

Jamil Rostami (born 1971) is an Iranian film director.

In 2002 he made his first short film titled The Trouble of Being a Boy in Kurdish, which was screened in 24 domestic and international festivals and was received several awards.

He made his first feature-length film, Requiem of Snow, in 2005. Iranian film music composer Fariborz Lachini composed the music for the film and Morteza Poursamadi handled the photography. The movie was awarded the prestigious Crystal Simorgh for the best director in Asia and Middle East Films section of the International Fajr Film Festival. A joint production of Iran and Iraq, Requiem of Snow was the first film to represent Iraq in the Best Foreign Language Film category at the Oscars.

His latest film, Jani Gal, is a Kurdish language drama, about Kurdish separatists in the 1940s and 1950 trying to create a Kurdish state from parts of Iran and Iraq. This film was also selected to represent Iraq in the Best Foreign Language Film category at the Oscars.
