= Jani Gal =

- Sorani Kurdish: ژانی گەل
- Directed by: Jamil Rostami
- Screenplay by: Khosro Sina; Jamil Rostami
- Based on: Jani Gal by Ibrahim Ahmad
- Produced by: Jamil Rostami
- Starring: Nzar Salami; Renas Wrya
- Cinematography: Nader Masumi
- Edited by: Morteza Moeeni
- Music by: Karen Homayounfar
- Production company: Suli Film
- Release date: July 22, 2007
- Running time: 100 minutes
- Country: Iraq
- Language: Kurdish

Jani Gal (Sorani Kurdish: ژانی گەل, romanized: Janî Gel, lit. 'The Agony of a People') is a 2007 Kurdish-language Kurdish drama film directed by Jamil Rostami, who co-wrote the screenplay with Khosro Sina and also served as the producer. The film is based on Ibrahim Ahmad's 1972 novel of the same name. The film stars Nzar Salami, Renas Wrya, and Abdul Hamajwan. The story, set in the Kurdistan of the 1940s and 1950s, chronicles Jwamer after his release from prison and his search for his wife and son. It was Iraq's submission to the 80th Academy Awards for the Academy Award for Best Foreign Language Film, but was not accepted as a nominee.

== Plot ==
The story is set in 1950s Iraq and illustrates the plight of Juamer in a flashback structure. When Juamer's wife goes into labor, he runs to get the midwife but is caught in the midst of a clash between Kurdish protestors and Iraqi police. He is mistakenly arrested, tortured and sentenced to ten years imprisonment. After his release, Juamer sets out to find his loved ones but he discovers that his wife died, without medical help, on the same day that he was arrested.

== Production ==
the Make up artists of the film were Radmehr Aalipour and Ali Hamedi.

== Accolades ==
Year	Award	Category	Nominee	Result	Ref(s)
2008	Boston Film Festival	Best International Filmmaker Award	Jamil Rostami	Won	
2008	Moondance International Film Festival	Columbine Award	Jani Gal	Won	

== See also ==
- Cinema of Iraq
- List of submissions to the 80th Academy Awards for Best Foreign Language Film
