= Return of the Storks =

2007 Slovak film by Martin Repka

Return of the Storks (Slovak: Návrat bocianov) is a 2007 Slovak film directed by Martin Repka. It was Slovakia's submission to the 80th Academy Awards for the Academy Award for Best Foreign Language Film, but was not accepted as a nominee.

== See also ==
- Cinema of Slovakia
- List of submissions to the 80th Academy Awards for Best Foreign Language Film
