= Son of Babylon =

- Film poster
- Directed by: Mohamed Al-Daradji
- Written by: Mohamed Al-Daradji; Mithal Ghazi; Jennifer Norridge
- Produced by: Isabelle Stead; Atia Al-Daradji; Mohamed Al-Daradji
- Starring: Shazada Hussein; Yasser Talib
- Cinematography: Mohamed Al-Daradji
- Edited by: Mohamed Al-Daradji & Pascale Chavance
- Music by: Kad Achouri
- Release date: January 2010
- Running time: 90 minutes
- Country: Iraq
- Languages: Arabic(Iraqi) & Kurdish
- Budget: $2 million

Son of Babylon (Arabic: ابن بابل) is a 2010 Iraqi drama film directed, co-produced and co-written by Mohamed Al-Daradji, Variety's Middle Eastern Filmmaker of the year 2010.

The film was developed through The Sundance Institute and was selected as Iraq's official entry for the Best Foreign Language Film at the 83rd Academy Awards, but it didn't make the final shortlist.

== Plot ==
The film is set initially in Northern Iraq, 2003, two weeks after the fall of Saddam Hussein. Ahmed, a 12-year-old boy begrudgingly follows in the shadow of his grandmother. On hearing news that prisoners of war have been found alive in the South, she is determined to discover the fate of her missing son, Ahmed's father, who never returned from the Gulf war in 1991. From the mountains of Kurdistan to the sands of Babylon, they hitch rides from strangers and cross paths with fellow pilgrims, on all too similar journeys. Struggling to understand his grandmother's search, Ahmed follows in the forgotten footsteps of a father he never knew.

== Cast ==
- Shazada Hussein
- Yasser Talib

== Awards ==
- 60th Berlin International Film Festival, 2010 winner of the Amnesty Film Award & Peace Prize
- Karlovy Vary International Film Festival, 2010 winner of the NETPAC Award
- Raindance Film Festival, 2010, winner Best International Feature Film
- Hawaii International Film Festival, 2010, Grand Jury Prize Best Feature Film
- Edinburgh International Film Festival, 2010, Special Mention
- Cinema City IFF, Serbia 2010, Special Mention
- Zadar Film Forum, 2010, Best European Co-production

== See also ==
- List of submissions to the 83rd Academy Awards for Best Foreign Language Film
- List of Iraqi submissions for the Academy Award for Best Foreign Language Film
