= Dreams (2006 film) =

Dreams (Arabic: أحلام (Ahlaam) ) is a 2006 Iraqi film directed by Mohamed Al-Daradji. It was Iraq's submission to the 79th Academy Awards for the Academy Award for Best Foreign Language Film, but was not accepted as a nominee.

== About ==
Mohamed Al-Daradji returned to Iraq shortly after the American invasion of Baghdad. There he found psychiatric patients wandering the streets as the hospitals were being destroyed by the bombings. The experience served as the seed for what would be Mohamed's first feature film, Ahlaam, and the second Iraqi feature produced since the fall of Saddam Hussein. It was filmed on location in Baghdad in 2004. "I would like to bring the subject very close to the audience with an artistic point of view" he said.

During the time when Ahlaam was filmed was when the insurgency was most dangerous in Iraq. Al-Daradji and his crew took many risks while filming Ahlaam: Al-Daradji was captured twice and tortured by rival insurgents while his cast and crew came under fire from both militias and US troops. Al-Daradji commented "As Iraqi filmmakers, we must stay in our own country and make our films, even with all the dangers...We must show the Iraqi point of view. You don't know how important it is for us to tell our stories." Two years after Ahlaam's international premiere, it was shown in Mohammed's home country of Iraq at the Baghdad National Theatre. Despite 200 people being killed that day following a surge of attacks across Baghdad, 1,000 people made their way to the screening.

== Synopsis ==
The film begins with a shot of Baghdad in 2003, two days before the fall of Saddam's regime. It is nighttime, and the city is ablaze with fire and smoke. Two of the main characters call out the names of their loved ones from within the psychiatric ward of a Baghdad hospital, against a backdrop of explosions and gunfire. The film then cuts to five years prior in Baghdad, 1998. The three main characters, Mehdi Ali Al-Lam, Ali Hussein Araheif, and Ahlaam Mohamed Al-Saadi, are in the midst of every-day life. Ahlaam is attending university, Mehdi is getting ready to take his exam for medical school, and Ali is working as a soldier in the Iraqi military. As the movie progresses each character is faced with a turning point in their lives. For Ali, his turning point is Operation Desert Fox. He is stationed with his best friend Hasan when they are hit by the American and British bombing of Iraq in December, 1998. Hasan sustains fatal injuries, and Ali attempts to carry him to a hospital. Ali crosses a border while carrying his friend and is picked up by a van and sent to the army jail. In the army jail, he is charged as a deserter and sentenced to have his ear cut off and to incarceration in a mental asylum. For Ahlaam, the turning point is her wedding day. She is getting ready to marry her betrothed, Ahmed, when he is arrested by Saddam's men. The next time she appears in the movie, she is a patient in the same mental asylum as Ali, calling out Ahmed's name and being treated with shock therapy. For Mehdi, the turning point is when he discovers he will have to join the military rather than become a doctor as planned because his father was a communist, and thus Mehdi does not have the proper connections to achieve his goal and avoid military service. After explaining how the three main characters all arrive to the psychiatric institution, the movie cuts back to Baghdad in 2003, back to the opening scene. After serving in the military for one year, Mehdi became a doctor. In 2003, he happens to be the new doctor at the mental asylum holding Ali and Ahlaam. Presently, the mental asylum is hit by a bomb. Many of the patients, including Ahlaam, escape into Baghdad. Dr. Mehdi enlists the help of Ali to round up the patients and bring them back. The film follows Ali, Ahlaam, and Mehdi as they wander around an empty Baghdad. Ali works to recover lost patients and help bring them to safety, while Ahlaam wanders confused and lost; she is taken advantage of by a man who she thinks is Ahmed. Ali is fatally shot as he is trying to help return patients. Ahlaam runs away into an abandoned building; as Mehdi and her family try to enter to find and bring her back to safety, they are blocked by American forces who don't understand the situation and answer with force. The final shot of the film shows her standing on top of the building, looking at Baghdad.

== Cast ==
- Aseel Adel - Ahlaam
- Bashir Al-Majid - Ali
- Mohamed Hashim - Mehdi

== See also ==
- Cinema of Iraq
- List of submissions to the 79th Academy Awards for Best Foreign Language Film
