= Mohamed Al-Daradji =

Iraqi film director

- محمد الدراجي
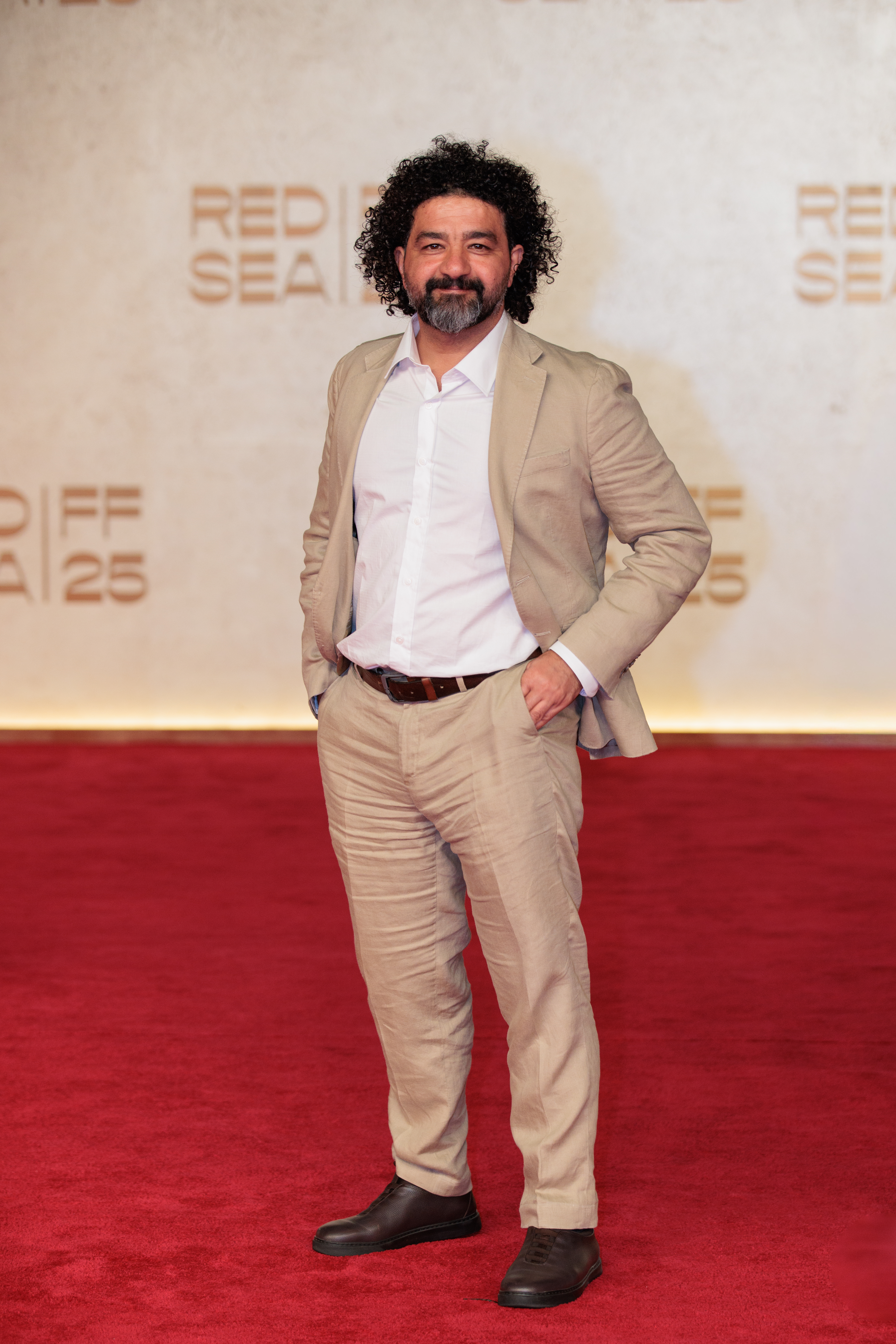
- Mohamed Al-Daradji
- Born: 6 August 1978 (age 48); Baghdad, Iraq
- Citizenship: Iraq
- Education: Leeds Beckett University
- Occupations: Filmmaker; screenwriter
- Awards: See below

Mohamed Al-Darraji (Arabic: محمد الدراجي; born 6 August 1978 in Baghdad, Iraq) is an Iraqi film director. He studied theater in Iraq, and cinematography and directing in England. He is known for his drama films, which focus on political affairs in the Middle East and their effects on interpersonal relationships.

== Personal life ==
Al-Daradji was born and raised in Iraq. His aunt had lost a son in the Iran–Iraq War, and he cites her grief as a motivation for his films, which address both the terrible suffering and the hopefulness for the future felt by many Iraqis. In 1995, he fled to the Netherlands: “And now I am proud. [...] I am a refugee who came to Holland fifteen years ago, with one pair of trousers, dirty clothes, and one pair of shoes. I will tell myself this [...] and I will tell that to my family. I am proud of Holland that gave me this great energy and this great opportunity to find myself - that is really important for me.”

As of May 2008, Al-Daradji is unmarried and does not have children.

== Education and career ==
His first job in the Netherlands was as a cameraman. Later he studied at Leeds Beckett University's Northern Film School in Leeds, UK where he obtained master's degrees in Cinematography and Directing. During his graduate studies, he created many short films and commercials, which earned him the prestigious Kodak Student Commercial Award for Cinematography.

In 2003, he returned to Baghdad, Iraq to begin work on his first feature film Ahlaam which he filmed over in a four-month period during the war. Filming was difficult as electricity would often cut out from time to time. Towards the end of filming, he and three members of his crew were kidnapped but managed to escape being killed by insurgents, who accused them of making a propaganda film in support of the U.S.-backed Iraqi government. The captors were preparing to shoot them before they fled from the sound of police sirens. On the same day, they were said to have been abducted again from a Baghdad hospital by another group of gunmen who beat them up and then turned them over to the U.S. military, who held them in harsh conditions for six days on the suspicion that they were filming insurgent attacks for Al Qaida. Ahlaam screened at more than 125 international film festivals and received more than 22 awards, as well as Academy Award and Golden Globe consideration.

In 2008, Al-Daradji became a Sundance fellow.

Al-Daradji again came into prominence upon release of his 2009 drama Son of Babylon, which premiered at the Middle East International Film Festival (now known as the Abu Dhabi Film Festival) and was the first feature film to be financially supported by the festival. It was developed through the Sundance Institute. The film made its world premiere at the film festival Berlinale2010 (Berlin International Film Festival), and earned him Variety magazine's Middle East Filmmaker of the Year award, Berlin's Amnesty Award and Peace Prize, the NETPAC Award at Karlovy Vary International Film Festival, and a special mention at Edinburgh International Film Festival. The film was selected as the Iraqi entry for the 2011 Academy Award for Best Foreign Language film nominations, however it did not make the final shortlist. Tim Gray, editor of Variety, said the following upon naming Al-Daradji the Middle East Filmmaker of the Year: "We wanted to honour Mohamed Al Daradji, not because he is a great Middle Eastern filmmaker, but because he is simply a great filmmaker."

== Filmography ==
- 2025 – Hijra (Producer)
- 2017 - The Journey
- 2013 - In the Sands of Babylon
- 2011 - In my Mother's Arms
- 2009 - Son of Babylon
- 2008 - War, Love, God, & Madness
- 2005 - Ahlaam (Dreams)
- 2003 - No. 438
- 2003 - The War

== Awards ==
- 2006: Brooklyn International Film Festival Spirit Award for Ahlaam
- 2010 Variety's Middle Eastern Filmmaker of the Year 2010
- 2010 Seattle International Film Festival, Emerging Master
- 2010 Amnesty International Film Award at the Berlin Film Festival
- 2010 Raindance Award at the British Independent Film
