= Sahim Omar Kalifa =

Belgian-Kurdish filmmaker, born 1980

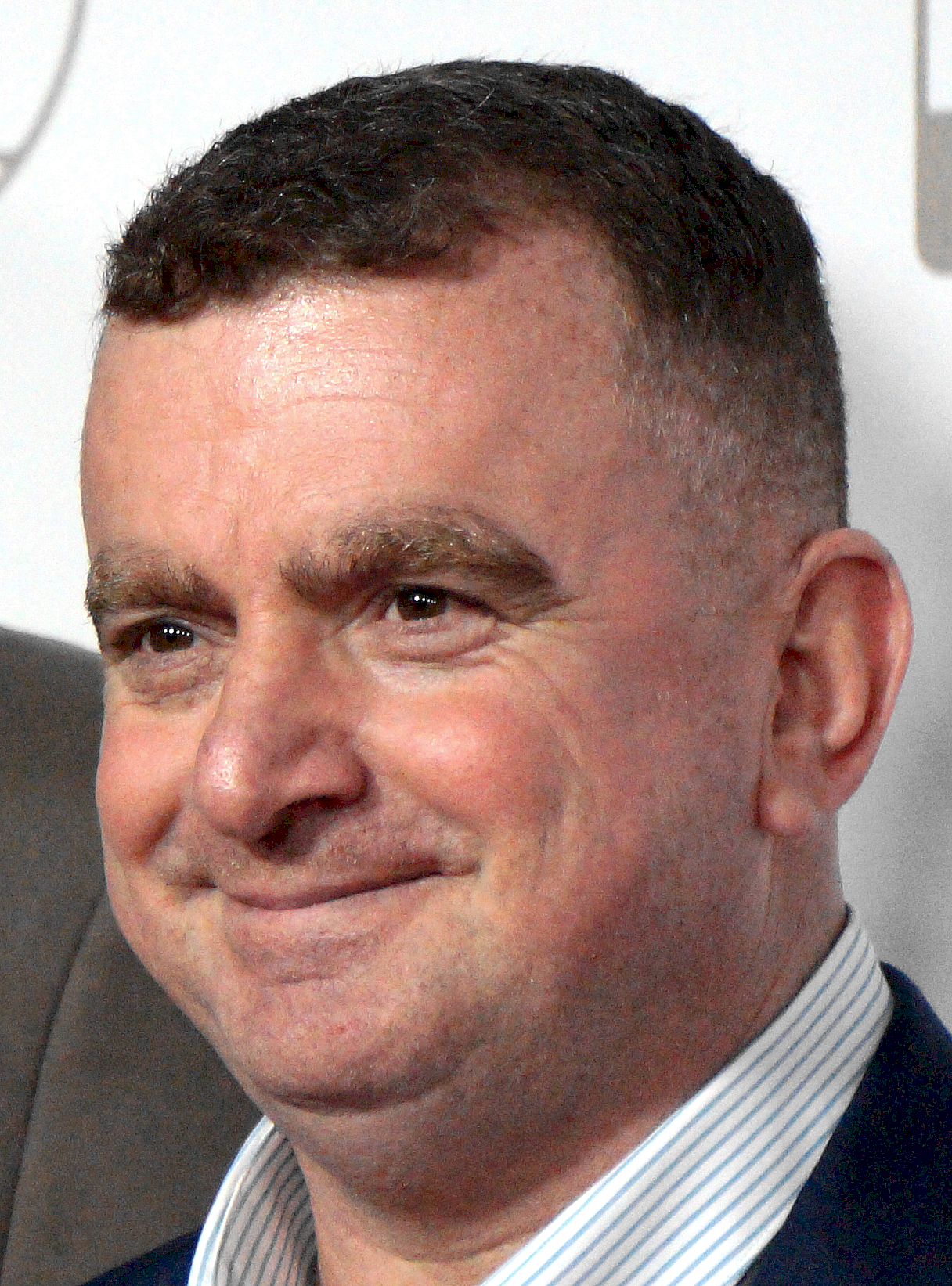
Sahim Omar Kalifa in 2024

Sahim Omar Kalifa (born 1980 in Zakho, Iraqi Kurdistan) is a Belgian-Kurdish filmmaker based in Belgium.

== Life and career ==
In 2001, he came to Belgium, and in 2008 he got his Master's degree in filmmaking at Sint-Lukas Film School, Brussels. With his short film Nan (2008), Kalifa won the Best Flemish Student Film at the Leuven International Short Film Festival. Later on, Kalifa has gone on to win 96 international awards for his short films Land of the Heroes, Baghdad Messi, and Bad Hunter.

Some of his notable achievements include:

- Jury Prize as Best Short film for Land of the Heroes at the 61st Berlin International Film Festival.
- Baghdad Messi was shortlisted for the 87th Academy Awards, better known as The Oscars. It was one of the 10 finalists.
- Bad Hunter was shortlisted for the 88th Academy Awards. Bad Hunter also won several international awards at some important film festivals, like the Jury Award at the 59th Valladolid, the 38th Montreal World, the Dubai IFF, the Flickerfest International Film Festival, and the Jury Prize in the Muhr Short Film Competition at the 2014 Dubai International Film Festival.
- Winner of The Grand Prix For Best Film at 44th Ghent Film Festival.
- Best Director and Audience Award for Best Film at 18th Arras Film Festival, France.
- Audience Award for Best Film at 35th Annonay Film Festival, France.
- 47th Rotterdam International Film Festival – official selection.
- 72nd Edinburgh Film Festival – official selection.
- 35th Munich Film Festival – official selection.
- 42nd Montreal World Film Festival, Canada.

In 2014, Sahim was chosen in Istanbul as Best Kurdish film director. In 2016, Sahim was invited to be one of the more than 6,000 voting members of the Academy Awards. In May 2016, Sahim started filming his first feature film Zagros, supported by Vlaams Audiovisueel Fonds (VAF), Dutch Film Fund, and Eurimages. In 2017, his documentary film Cornered in Molenbeek won the Best Belgian Documentary TV Series at the Docville Documentary Film Festival; it was also selected for the Hot Docs Documentary Film Festival.

His documentary film Iraq's Invisible Beauty (2022) tells the story of the late Iraqi photographer Latif al-Ani and his photographic documentation of Iraq between the 1950s and 1970s.

In 2021, Sahim began filming the feature film Baghdad Messi based on his 2012 short film. It had its world premiere on January 28, 2023, at the Ostend Film Festival. In August 2024, his film was selected as the Iraqi entry for the Best International Feature Film at the 97th Academy Awards.

== Filmography ==
=== Short films ===
- Nan (2008)
- Land of the Heroes (2011)
- Baghdad Messi (2012)
- Bad Hunter (2013)

=== Feature films ===
- Zagros (2017)
- Cornered in Molenbeek (2018)
- Iraq's Invisible Beauty (2022)
- Baghdad Messi (2023)
