= Juraj Vaculík =

Juraj Vaculík is a Slovak business executive who co-founded AeroMobil and acted as CEO until its closure in 2023. Juraj had an active role in the Velvet Revolution and currently works within the international media and advertising industries. He also acts as an angel investor with investments in media content, IT, and transportation.

== Velvet Revolution ==
During Velvet Revolution in 1989 which ends communist era in former Czechoslovakia Juraj Vaculík was one of the key persons in Student Movement which has started process of democratization and established new post-revolution government in Slovakia.

== Advertising Industry ==
At the beginning of the 90s he started his career as a creative director for major global advertising agencies which started their operations in Czechia and Slovakia. In 1996 Juraj founded one of the leading independent advertising agencies in the CEE region, extending its reach to over 30 countries.

== Revolution in personal transportation ==
In 2010 Juraj co-founded AeroMobil and managed the company as its CEO until its closure in 2023. In 2013, together with the inventor and co-founder Stefan Klein, he unveiled the pre-prototype of AeroMobil 2.5 at the SAE Conference in Montreal. A year later, an experimental prototype of AeroMobil 3.0 was developed under his lead with the team of 12 people and presented at the Pioneers festival in Vienna. At the beginning of 2015, AeroMobil successfully attracted the attention of visitors and potential customers at the most prestigious supercars show, Top Marques Monaco alongside the prestigious sports vehicles from around the world. Later in June, AeroMobil was presented at the Founders Forum event in the UK, where it caught the attention of many visitors and the Financial Times. In October, the public experienced the prototype at the EXPO in Milan, where it was part of the Slovak exposition. Renowned magazine, Popular Science, presented AeroMobil with Invention of the Year 2015 award and UK edition od Wired magazine ranked the project among the top 10 rule breakers in 2014.
