= Tvoja tvár znie povedome =

Slovak reality television series

- Winners: Lukáš Adamec, Mária Čírová, Peter Braječík, Dárius Koči, Dávid Hartl, Martin Klinčúch, Viktória Ráková
- No. of episodes: 72

Release
- Original network: Markíza
- Original release: March 6, 2016 – present

Tvoja tvár znie povedome is a Slovak reality television series that is aired on Markíza. It is both based on the Endemol format Your Face Sounds Familiar and an adaptation of the Spanish Tu cara me suena. The show was first broadcast on March 6, 2016 and is still aired. The show involves eight celebrities (singers, actors and television personalities) portraying various iconic singers each week to win 1,000 EUR for their chosen charity.

== Format ==
The show challenges celebrities to perform as different iconic music artists every week, which are chosen by the show's "Randomiser". They are then judged by the panel of celebrity judges.

Each celebrity becomes transformed into a different singer each week, and performs an iconic song and dance routine well known by that particular singer. The 'randomiser' can choose any older or younger artist available in the machine, or even a singer of the opposite sex, or a deceased singer. Celebrity is transformed to look like well known singer, use of blackface is not a rarity to this day.

The contestants are awarded points from the judges based on their singing and dance routines. After the jury vote, the contestants have to give a set of points to a fellow contestant of their choice. The total score of each contestant is counted by summing the points from judges and contestant's voting. In case of a tie, the judges will choose the weeks winner. If a contestant shares last place with another contestant, only one came last that week.

Whoever is at the top of the leaderboard at the end of the each show receives a cash prize for a charity of their choice and a further grand prize for the "series champion".

=== Voting ===
The contestants are awarded points from the judges (and each other) based on their singing and dance routines. The points go from 1 to 8, with 8 being the judge's favorite of the night. After that, each contestant gives 5 points to a fellow contestant of their choice (known as "Bonus" points). The judges' score is combined with the "Bonus" points.

== Cast ==
=== Presenter ===
Table of presenter of Tvoja tvár znie povedome:

Presenter	Season 1 2016	Season 2 2016	Season 3 2017	Season 4 2018	Season 5 2019	Season 6 2021	Season 7 2022
Martin Nikodým							
Martin Pyco Rausch							

Presenter Contestant

=== Judges ===
Table of judges of Tvoja tvár znie povedome:

Judge	Season 1 2016	Season 2 2016	Season 3 2017	Season 4 2018	Season 5 2019	Season 6 2021	Season 7 2022
Mário Kuly Kollár							
Zuzana Kubovčíková Šebová							
Marián Čekovský							
Attila Végh							
Lujza Garajová Schrameková							
Daniel Dangl							
Zuzana Fialová							
Andrej Bičan							
Juraj Šoko Tabaček							

Judge Contestant

=== Coaches ===
Table of coaches of Tvoja tvár znie povedome:

Coach	Season 1 2016	Season 2 2016	Season 3 2017	Season 4 2018	Season 5 2019	Season 6 2021	Season 7 2022
Jana Daňová-Bugalová							
Miňo Kereš							
Juraj Kemka							
Peter Brajerčík							
Zuzana Fialová							
Barbora Švidraňová							

Vocal Dance Drama Contestant

== Series ==
Season	Duration dates	No. of stars	No. of weeks	Celebrity honor places			
Season	Duration dates	No. of stars	No. of weeks	Winner	Second place	Third place	Fourth place
1	March 6 – May 1, 2016	8	10	Lukáš Adamec	Barbora Švidraňová	Štefan Skrúcaný	Viktor Vincze
2	September 4 – November 6, 2016	8	10	Mária Čírová	Martin Harich	Svätopluk Malachovský	Lenka Vavrinčíková
3	March 5 – May 8, 2017	8	10	Peter Brajerčík	Tomáš Palonder	Eva Máziková	Lina Mayer
4	September 9 – November 11, 2018	8	10	Dárius Koči	Mária Bartalos	Juraj Loj	Jasmina Alagič
5	September 8 – November 10, 2019	8	10	Dávid Hartl	Nela Pocisková	Noël Czuczor	Alexandra Gachulincová
6	March 7 – May 9, 2021	8	10	Martin Klinčúch	Evelyn	Barbora Piešová	Dušan Cinkota
7	September 4 – November 6, 2022	8	10	Viktória Ráková	Adam Pavlovčin	Liv Bielovič	Karol Tóth

== Season 1 - 2016 ==
This season was announced in the year 2016 and started on March 6, 2016. In this Season, Martin Pyco Rausch was the presenter. The Judges were Daniel Dangl, Zuzana Fialová, Mário Kuly Kollár and a special guest such as Juraj Loj, Adela Banášová, Filip Tůma or Katarína Knechtová. The winner was Lukáš Adamec.

=== Contestants ===
Celebrity	Known for	Episodes won	Status
Michaela Čobejová	Actress	none	Eliminated 1st on April 27, 2016
Andrej Bičan	Presenter	none	Eliminated 2nd on April 27, 2016
Emma Drobná	Singer	once	Eliminated 3rd on April 27, 2016
Helena Krajčiová	Actress	once	Eliminated 4th on April 27, 2016
Viktor Vincze	Presenter	once	Fourth place on May 1, 2016
Štefan Skrúcaný	Actor	twice	Third place on May 1, 2016
Barbora Švidraňová	Actress	three times	Second place on May 1, 2016
Lukáš Adamec	Singer	twice	Winner on May 1, 2016

=== Results chart ===
Tvoja tvár znie povedome (season 1) - Weekly scores
Celebrity	Place	Week 1	Week 2	Week 3	Week 4	Week 5	Week 6	Week 7	Week 8	Week 9	Final
Lukáš Adamec	1st	29	45	17	14	31	17	38	18	42	251
Barbora Švidraňová	2nd	33	18	37	24	25	23	51	22	24	257
Štefan Skrúcaný	3rd	16	40	10	14	27	59	13	45	9	233
Viktor Vincze	4th	31	20	19	10	11	33	31	29	45	229
Helena Krajčiová	5th	27	18	27	36	34	11	13	22	17	
Emma Drobná	6th	25	15	22	40	24	20	15	22	13	
Andrej Bičan	7th	13	22	21	19	20	14	18	16	28	
Michaela Čobejová	8th	10	6	31	27	12	7	5	10	6	

=== Performance chart ===
Contestant	Week 1	Week 2	Week 3	Week 4	Week 5	Week 6	Week 7	Week 8	Week 9	Final	
Lukáš Adamec	Tina Turner	Joe Cocker	Bob Marley	Ibrahim Maiga	Janis Joplin	Rick Astley	Ozzy Osbourne; Black Sabbath	Mário Kollár; Desmod	Susan Boyle	Victor Willis; Village People	James Hetfield; Metallica
Barbora Švidraňová	Adele	Martin Ďurinda; Tublatanka	Lady Gaga	Dolores O'Riordan; The Cranberries	Beyoncé	Christina Aguilera	Jim Carrey	Conchita Wurst	Freddie Mercury; Queen	Felipe Rose; Village People	Jessie J
Štefan Skrúcaný	Karel Gott	Marilyn Monroe	Pavol Habera; Team	Joey Tempest; Europe	Jiří Korn	Lenny Kravitz	Zdena Studenková	Louis Armstrong	Karol Duchoň	David Hodo; Village People	Elvis Presley
Viktor Vincze	Enrique Iglesias	Bruno Mars	Cher	Ricky Martin	Jon Bon Jovi; Bon Jovi	Gloria Gaynor	Elton John	John Travolta	Nicki Minaj	Glenn Hughes; Village People	Joe Cagg; Rednex
Helena Krajčiová	George Michael	Britney Spears	Annie Lennox	Jennifer Lopez	Prince	Miroslav Žbirka	Pink	Fergie	Shania Twain		Fab Morvan; Milli Vanilli
Emma Drobná	Rihanna	Katy Perry	Édith Piaf	Justin Bieber	Sinéad O'Connor	Robert Smith; The Cure	Taylor Swift	Michael Jackson	Miley Cyrus		Rob Pilatus; Milli Vanilli
Andrej Bičan	PSY	Axl Rose; Guns N' Roses	James Brown	Samantha Fox	Coolio	Redfoo; LMFAO	Peter Nagy	Nena	Kabir Bedi		Júlia Hečková
Michaela Čobejová	Madonna	Shakira	Vanilla Ice	Hana Hegerová	Kurt Cobain; Nirvana	Gwen Stefani	Nicole Scherzinger; The Pussycat Dolls	Joan Jett	Boy George; Culture Club		Peter Hečko

Color key:

indicates the contestant came first that week
indicates the contestant came last that week
indicates the contestant did not score

=== Guest performances ===
Episode	Guest	Performing as	Song title
1	Daniel Dangl	Robbie Williams	„Let Me Entertain You“
1	Zuzana Fialová	Amy Winehouse	„Rehab“
1	Mário Kuly Kollár	Luciano Pavarotti	„La Donna e Mobile“
10	Filip Tůma	Andrea Bocelli	„Con te Partiró“
10	Finalists	Village People	„Y.M.C.A.“

== Season 2 - 2016 ==
This season was announced in the year 2016 and started on September 4, 2016. In this Season, Martin Pyco Rausch was the presenter. The Judges were Daniel Dangl, Zuzana Fialová, Mário Kuly Kollár and a special guest such as Zdena Studenková, Lukáš Adamec, Tina or Viktor Vincze. The special episode features the best performances in the program. The winner was Mária Čírová.

=== Contestants ===
Celebrity	Known for	Episodes won	Status
Andrej Bičan	Presenter	none	Eliminated 1st on October 30, 2016
Zuzana Vačková	Actress	once	Eliminated 2nd on October 30, 2016
Miroslava Partlová	Actress	once	Eliminated 3rd on October 30, 2016
Patrik Vyskočil	Actor	twice	Eliminated 4th on October 30, 2016
Lenka Vavrinčíková	Presenter	once	Fourth place on November 6, 2016
Svätopluk Malachovský	Actor	three times	Third place on November 6, 2016
Martin Harich	Singer	none	Second place on November 6, 2016
Mária Čírová	Singer	twice	Winner on November 6, 2016

=== Results chart ===
Tvoja tvár znie povedome (season 2) - Weekly scores
Celebrity	Place	Week 1	Week 2	Week 3	Week 4	Week 5	Week 6	Week 7	Week 8	Week 9	Final
Mária Čírová	1st	20	30	47	9	34	28	18	19	25	230
Martin Harich	2nd	14	30	24	27	19	26	24	33	32	229
Svätopluk Malachovský	3rd	37	11	29	33	23	14	34	10	38	229
Lenka Vavrinčíková	4th	28	39	23	24	10	15	23	21	37	220
Patrik Vyskočil	5th	17	27	18	11	51	19	31	36	9	
Miroslava Partlová	6th	24	24	12	29	24	57	5	31	12	
Zuzana Vačková	7th	22	14	23	21	14	10	36	6	20	
Andrej Bičan	8th	22	9	8	30	9	15	13	28	11	

=== Performance chart ===
Contestant	Week 1	Week 2	Week 3	Week 4	Week 5	Week 6	Week 7	Week 8	Week 9	Final	
Mária Čírová	Pharrell Williams	Alicia Keys	Whoopi Goldberg	Pavol Hammel	Lady Gaga	Rihanna	Michael Jackson; The Jackson 5	Amy Winehouse	Idina Menzel	Victoria Beckham; Spice Girls	Ruslana
Martin Harich	Ed Sheeran	CeeLo Green	Linda Perry; 4 Non Blondes	R. Kelly	Cyndi Lauper	Lauri Ylönen; The Rasmus	Rytmus	Billie Joe Armstrong; Green Day	Israel Kamakawiwo'ole	Geri Halliwell; Spice Girls	Bono; U2
Svätopluk Malachovský	Aretha Franklin	Billy Idol	Peter Dvorský	Barry Gibb; Bee Gees	Will Smith	Eva Máziková	Barry White	Falco	George Michael; Wham!	Emma Bunton; Spice Girls	Richard Müller
Lenka Vavrinčíková	Natalia Oreiro	MC Hammer	Kylie Minogue	Keith Flint; The Prodigy	Tracy Chapman	Madonna	Geri Halliwell	Lou Bega	André 3000; OutKast	Melanie C Spice Girls	Janet Jackson
Patrik Vyskočil	Freddie Mercury; Queen	Shakira	Paul Stanley; Kiss	Adam Levine; Maroon 5	Steven Tyler; Aerosmith	Nina Simone	Till Lindemann; Rammstein	Montserrat Caballé	Elton John		Gerard Butler
Miroslava Partlová	Whitney Houston	Christina Aguilera	Stevie Wonder	Catherine Zeta-Jones	Marika Gombitová	Sia	Alice Cooper	Beyoncé	Katy Perry		Emmy Rossum
Zuzana Vačková	Meghan Trainor	Peter Hrivňák; Horkýže Slíže	Barbra Streisand	Britney Spears	Bruno Mars	Gloria Estefan; Miami Sound Machine	Cher	Dara Rolins	Annie Lennox; Eurythmics		Dieter Bohlen; Modern Talking
Andrej Bičan	King Julien	Shaggy	Lene Nystrøm; Aqua	Scatman John	Miroslav Noga	Bobby Farrell; Boney M.	Barbara Haščáková	Lionel Richie	Petr Janda; Olympic		Thomas Anders; Modern Talking

Color key:

indicates the contestant came first that week
indicates the contestant came last that week
indicates the contestant did not score

=== Guest performances ===
Episode	Guest	Performing as	Song title
1	Lukáš Adamec	Meat Loaf	„I’d Do Anything For Love“
9	Martin Pyco Rausch	Marilyn Manson	„Rock is Death“
10	Finalists; Barbora Švidraňová	Spice Girls	„Wannabe“

== Season 3 - 2017 ==
This season was announced in the year 2017 and started on March 5, 2017. In this Season, Martin Pyco Rausch was the presenter. The Judges were Daniel Dangl, Zuzana Fialová, Mário Kuly Kollár and Juraj Šoko Tabaček. The winner was Peter Brajerčík.

=== Contestants ===
Celebrity	Known for	Episodes won	Status
René Štúr	Actor	once	Eliminated 1st on April 30, 2017
Tomáš Bezdeda	Singer	once	Eliminated 2nd on April 30, 2017
Lucia Siposová	Actress	once	Eliminated 3rd on April 30, 2017
Viktória Valúchová	Actress	once	Eliminated 4th on April 30, 2017
Lina Mayer	Singer	once	Fourth place on May 8, 2017
Eva Máziková	Singer	once	Third place on May 8, 2017
Tomáš Palonder	Singer	twice	Second place on May 8, 2017
Peter Brajerčík	Actor	twice	Winner on May 8, 2017

=== Results chart ===
Tvoja tvár znie povedome (season 3) - Weekly scores
Celebrity	Place	Week 1	Week 2	Week 3	Week 4	Week 5	Week 6	Week 7	Week 8	Week 9	Final
Peter Brajerčík	1st	13	26	21	29	30	22	38	9	28	216
Tomáš Palonder	2nd	27	23	22	23	20	31	29	29	31	235
Eva Máziková	3rd	24	35	24	37	11	27	9	39	16	222
Lina Mayer	4th	34	17	26	22	21	22	16	23	25	206
Viktória Valuchová	5th	18	36	13	8	18	21	38	31	22	
Lucia Siposová	6th	22	14	30	40	9	19	22	25	23	
Tomáš Bezdeda	7th	22	19	17	14	55	31	10	9	20	
René Štúr	8th	24	14	31	11	20	11	22	19	19	

=== Performance chart ===
Contestant	Week 1	Week 2	Week 3	Week 4	Week 5	Week 6	Week 7	Week 8	Week 9	Final	
Peter Brajerčík	Ján Kuric; Vidiek	Bård Ylvisåker; Ylvis	Anita Pointer; The Pointer Sisters	Iggy Pop	Ray Charles	Michael Stipe; R.E.M.	LunchMoney Lewis	Ya Kid K Technotronic	Elton John	Robin Pors; Vengaboys	PSY
Tomáš Palonder	Ella Fitzgerald	Václav Patejdl	Brian Johnson; AC/DC	Loalwa Braz; Kaoma	Tom Jones	Dave Gahan; Depeche Mode	Prince	Keith Flint; The Prodigy	Annie Lennox; Eurythmics	Donny Latupeirissa; Vengaboys	Bruce Dickinson; Iron Maiden
Eva Máziková	Tina Turner	Nicolas Reyes; Gipsy Kings	Liza Minnelli	František Krištof Veselý	Jessica Rabbit	Bonnie Tyler	Daniel Nekonečný	Steven Tyler; Aerosmith	Jennifer Lopez	Kim Sasabone; Vengaboys	Plácido Domingo
Lina Mayer	Adele	Donna Summer	Sia	Ne-Yo	Katarína Knechtová; Peha	Loreen	Tarkan	Jessie J	Beyoncé	Denise Post-Van Rijswijk; Vengaboys	Michael Jackson
Viktória Valuchová	H.P. Baxxter; Scooter	Etta James	Rihanna	Dusty Hill; ZZ Top	Ariana Grande	Axl Rose; Guns N' Roses	Mariah Carey	Montserrat Caballé	Olivia Newton-John		Redfoo; LMFAO
Lucia Siposová	Nicole Kidman	Eminem	Sam Brown	Beth Ditto; Gossip	Ricky Martin	Whitney Houston	Rod Stewart	Madonna	Johnny Rotten; Sex Pistols		Ariana Grande
Tomáš Bezdeda	Lady Gaga	Freddie Mercury; Queen	Robin Thicke	Dr. Alban	Ed Sheeran	Aretha Franklin	Phil Collins; Genesis	Elvis Presley	Carl Douglas		SkyBlu; LMFAO
René Štúr	Antonio Banderas	Christina Aguilera	Michal Dočolomanský	Jay Kay; Jamiroquai	Lenny Kravitz	Justin Timberlake	Romina Power	Bruno Mars	Robo Grigorov		John Legend

Color key:

indicates the contestant came first that week
indicates the contestant came last that week
indicates the contestant did not score

=== Guest performances ===
Episode	Guest	Performing as	Song title
1	Emma Drobná; Viktor Vincze; Lukáš Adamec; Svätopluk Malachovský; Patrik Vyskočil	Backstreet Boys	„Everybody (Backstreet’s Back)“
3	Juraj Šoko Tabaček; Andrej Bičan	Right Said Fred	„I’m Too Sexy“
10	Martin Pyco Rausch	Christopher Walken	„Weapon of Choice“
10	Finalists	Vengaboys	„Boom, Boom, Boom, Boom!!“
10	Matthias Settele	The Beatles	„Come Together“

== Season 4 - 2018 ==
This season was announced in the year 2018 and started on September 9, 2018. In this Season, Martin Pyco Rausch was the presenter. The Judges were Daniel Dangl, Zuzana Fialová, Mário Kuly Kollár and Andrej Bičan. The special guest of this season was Helena Vondráčková. The winner was Dárius Koči.

=== Contestants ===
Celebrity	Known for	Episodes won	Status
Zuzana Haasová	Actress	once	Eliminated 1st on November 4, 2018
Miroslav Šmajda	Singer	once	Eliminated 2nd on November 4, 2018
Ivana Regešová	Singer	once	Eliminated 3rd on November 4, 2018
Martin Nikodým	Presenter	once	Eliminated 4th on November 4, 2018
Jasmina Alagič	Model	once	Fourth place on November 11, 2018
Juraj Loj	Actor	once	Third place on November 11, 2018
Mária Bartalos	Actress	once	Second place on November 11, 2018
Dárius Koči	Actor	three times	Winner on November 11, 2018

=== Results chart ===
Tvoja tvár znie povedome (season 4) - Weekly scores
Celebrity	Place	Week 1	Week 2	Week 3	Week 4	Week 5	Week 6	Week 7	Week 8	Week 9	Final
Dárius Koči	1st	22	22	11	34	35	31	35	16	40	246
Mária Bartalos	2nd	43	16	15	30	8	34	34	13	30	223
Juraj Loj	3rd	29	23	26	26	31	37	13	15	18	218
Jasmina Alagič	4th	21	20	54	10	11	27	22	13	31	209
Martin Nikodým	5th	23	27	20	11	43	9	22	17	35	
Ivana Regešová	6th	19	43	7	18	30	7	25	39	18	
Miroslav Šmajda	7th	17	11	32	46	11	19	22	31	6	
Zuzana Haasová	8th	10	22	19	9	15	20	11	40	6	

=== Performance chart ===
Contestant	Week 1	Week 2	Week 3	Week 4	Week 5	Week 6	Week 7	Week 8	Week 9	Final	
Dárius Koči	Madonna	John Newman	Justin Bieber	Axl Rose; Guns N' Roses	Shirley Bassey	Michael Jackson	Amy Winehouse	Steven Tyler; Aerosmith	Keala Settle	Anni-Frid Lyngstad; ABBA	Cher
Mária Bartalos	Édith Piaf	Marilyn Manson	Meghan Trainor	Ciara	Eminem	Michaela Pašteková	Susan Boyle	Whoopi Goldberg	Jennifer Lopez	Benny Andersson; ABBA	The Weeknd
Juraj Loj	Andrea Bocelli	Robbie Williams	Mick Jones; The Clash	Meryl Streep	Justin Timberlake	Alla Pugacheva	Jean-Pierre Barda; Army of Lovers	Ewan McGregor	David Lee Roth; Van Halen	Agnetha Fältskog; ABBA	Shakira
Jasmina Alagič	Missy Elliott	Camila Cabello	Věra Bílá	Jim Morrison; The Doors	Barbara Haščáková	Alicia Keys	Paddy Kelly; The Kelly Family	Britney Spears	Joey McIntyre; New Kids on the Block	Björn Ulvaeus; ABBA	Rytmus
Martin Nikodým	Rag'n'Bone Man	Liz Mitchell; Boney M.	Ivan Mládek; Banjo Band	H.P. Baxxter; Scooter	James Brown	Amanda Lear	Jason Derulo	Tom Jones	Bill Nighy		Lucie Bílá
Ivana Regešová	Christina Aguilera	Adele	Ozzy Osbourne	Beyoncé	Ilona Csáková	Katy Perry	Lady Gaga	Calton Coffie; Inner Circle	Whitney Houston		Tina Turner
Miroslav Šmajda	Till Lindemann; Rammstein	Seal	Janis Joplin	Chubby Checker	Jimmy Pop; Bloodhound Gang	James Hetfield; Metallica	Stanislav Hložek	Tina Turner	Adam Levine; Maroon 5		Eros Ramazzotti
Zuzana Haasová	Annette Eltice; Ottawan	Beáta Dubasová	Charlie Chaplin	Julia Volkova t.A.t.U.	Cyndi Lauper	Pitbull	Dolly Parton	Björk	Luis Fonsi		Ilona Csáková

Color key:

indicates the contestant came first that week
indicates the contestant came last that week
indicates the contestant did not score

=== Guest performances ===
Episode	Guest	Performing as	Song title
1	Filip Tůma; Ján Koleník; Marek Fašiang; Vladimir Kobielsky	The Beatles	„She Loves You“
2	Daniel Dangl; Mário Kuly Kollár; Andrej Bičan	O-Zone	„Dragostea Din Tei“
3	Barbora Švidraňová; Emma Drobná; Lenka Vavrinčíková; Miroslava Partlová	Christina Aguilera; Lil' Kim; Mya; Pink	„Lady Marmelade“
4	Viktor Vincze; Adela Vinczeová	Elton John; Kiki Dee	„Don’t Go Breaking My Heart“
6	Tereza Mašková	Rihanna	„Diamonds“
7	Evelyn	Diana Ross	„Upside Down“
8	Zuzana Šebová; Daniel Kubovčík; Daniel Heriban	Modus	„Úsmev“
9	Gizka Oňová	Helena Vrtichová	„Diridonda“
10	Martin Pyco Rausch	Nina Hagen	„My Way“
10	Finalists	ABBA	„Waterloo“
10	Peter Brajerčík	Lenny Kravitz	„American Woman“

== Season 5 - 2019 ==
This season was announced in the year 2019 and started on September 8, 2019. In this Season, Martin Nikodým was the presenter. The Judges were Daniel Dangl, Zuzana Fialová, Mário Kuly Kollár and Zuzana Kubovčíková Šebová. The winner was Dávid Hartl.

=== Contestants ===
Celebrity	Known for	Episodes won	Status
Pavol Topoľský	Actor	once	Eliminated 1st on November 3, 2019
Rastislav Sokol	Actor	none	Eliminated 2nd on November 3, 2019
Zuzana Kraváriková	Actress	once	Eliminated 3rd on November 3, 2019
Karin Haydu	Actress	once	Eliminated 4th on November 3, 2019
Alexandra Gachulincová	Model	once	Fourth place on November 10, 2019
Noël Czuczor	Actor	once	Third place on November 10, 2019
Nela Pocisková	Actress	twice	Second place on November 10, 2019
Dávid Hartl	Actor	three times	Winner on November 10, 2019

=== Results chart ===
Tvoja tvár znie povedome (season 5) - Weekly scores
Celebrity	Place	Week 1	Week 2	Week 3	Week 4	Week 5	Week 6	Week 7	Week 8	Week 9	Final
Dávid Hartl	1st	34	21	42	28	13	17	21	20	33	229
Nela Pocisková	2nd	27	40	17	28	20	34	38	20	44	268
Noël Czuczor	3rd	29	40	19	18	23	17	35	20	35	236
Alexandra Gachulincová	4th	27	7	38	28	9	18	20	25	32	204
Karin Haydu	5th	11	9	39	18	31	42	8	27	10	
Zuzana Kraváriková	6th	32	13	10	18	21	18	30	27	14	
Rastislav Sokol	7th	10	34	13	18	25	31	11	22	10	
Pavol Topoľský	8th	14	20	6	28	42	7	21	23	6	

=== Performance chart ===
Contestant	Week 1	Week 2	Week 3	Week 4	Week 5	Week 6	Week 7	Week 8	Week 9	Final	
Dávid Hartl	Aretha Franklin	Justin Timberlake	Tina Turner	John Travolta	Billie Joe Armstrong; Green Day	Ariana Grande	Kylie Minogue	Miroslav Žbirka	Mária Čírová	Stevie Wonder	Freddie Mercury; Queen
Nela Pocisková	Michael Jackson	Jennifer Hudson	Thomas Anders; Modern Talking	Beyoncé	Ed Sheeran	Queen Latifah	Alice Cooper	Peter Hrivňák; Horkýže Slíže	Adele	Cyndi Lauper	Pink
Noël Czuczor	Cher	Jason Derulo	Justin Bieber	Janet Jackson	PikoTaro	Céline Dion	Rag'n'Bone Man	Helena Vondráčková	Stromae	Billy Joel	Missy Elliott
Alexandra Gachulincová	Sabrina	Alan Duffy; King África	Jennifer Lopez	Tupac Shakur	Rita Ora	Nicki Minaj	El Chombo	Jiří Korn	Dua Lipa	Tina Turner	Bob Marley
Karin Haydu	Katy Perry	Madonna	Jon Bon Jovi; Bon Jovi	Lana Del Rey	Marián Kochanský; Lojzo	Fergie	Nelly Furtado	Ben Cristovao	Crazy Frog	Diana Ross	Shawn Mendes
Zuzana Kraváriková	Lady Gaga	Kali	Rihanna	Lou Bega	Christina Aguilera	Bill Kaulitz; Tokio Hotel	Ellie Goulding	Martin Ďurinda; Tublatanka	CeeLo Green; Gnarls Barkley	Michael Jackson	Camila Cabello
Rastislav Sokol	Marilyn Manson	Precious Wilson; Eruption	Lobo Ismail	Barry White	Meghan Trainor	Holly Johnson; Frankie Goes to Hollywood	Grace Jones	Michal David	Irene Cara	Lionel Richie	Dávid Karvay; David Band
Pavol Topoľský	Bobby Farrell; Boney M.	Hana Zagorová	Franky Gee; Captain Jack	Mário Kollár; Desmod	Till Lindemann; Rammstein	Romina Power	Garou	Věra Bílá	Scatman John	Kenny Rogers	Miroslav Karvay; David Band

Color key:

indicates the contestant came first that week
indicates the contestant came last that week
indicates the contestant did not score

=== Guest performances ===
Episode	Guest	Performing as	Song title
1	Peter Brajerčík; Mária Bartalos; Dárius Koči	Las Ketchup	„The Ketchup Song (Aserejé)“
3	Zuzana Šebová; Daniel Dangl	Dara Rolins; Karel Gott	„Zvonky štestí“
4	Juraj Loj; Miroslava Partlová	Bradley Cooper; Lady Gaga	„Shallow“
5	Barbora Švidraňová; Veronika Krúpa Nízlová; Daniela Nízlová	Jessie J Ariana Grande; Nicki Minaj	„Bang Bang“
8	Oteckovia Children	Majka z Gurunu	„Spadla z oblakov“
10	All Contestants	USA for Africa	„We Are The World“
10	Zuzana Šebová; Miňo Kereš	Salt-N-Pepa	„Push It“

== Season 6 - 2021 ==
This season was announced on Spring 2021 and started on March 7, 2021. In this Season, Martin Nikodým was the presenter. The Judges were Mário Kuly Kollár, Zuzana Kubovčíková Šebová, Lujza Garajová Schrameková and a special guest such as Vladimír Kobielsky, Lukáš Latinák, Marián Čekovský or Boris Valábik. The special episode features performances of famous children from Slovak television series. The winner was Martin Klinčúch.

=== Contestants ===
Celebrity	Known for	Episodes won	Status
Fero Joke	Comedian	once	Eliminated 1st on May 2, 2021
Zuzana Belohorcová	Presenter	once	Eliminated 2nd on May 2, 2021
Braňo Mosný	Actor	once	Eliminated 3rd on May 2, 2021
Kristína Madarová	Actress	once	Eliminated 4th on May 2, 2021
Dušan Cinkota	Actor	twice	Fourth place on May 9, 2021
Barbora Piešová	Singer	once	Third place on May 9, 2021
Evelyn	Comedian	once	Second place on May 9, 2021
Martin Klinčúch	Actor	twice	Winner on May 9, 2021

=== Results chart ===
Tvoja tvár znie povedome (season 6) - Weekly scores
Celebrity	Place	Week 1	Week 2	Week 3	Week 4	Week 5	Week 6	Week 7	Week 8	Week 9	Final
Martin Klinčúch	1st	36	8	8	14	39	26	21	20	35	207
Evelyn	2nd	18	34	16	39	15	20	28	27	27	224
Barbora Piešová	3rd	21	32	32	26	12	28	43	29	26	249
Dušan Cinkota	4th	13	45	23	22	15	37	10	30	13	208
Kristína Madarová	5th	25	21	36	9	28	11	26	27	16	
Braňo Mosný	6th	27	15	34	16	27	38	15	13	13	
Zuzana Belohorcová	7th	20	13	15	23	39	9	25	26	16	
Fero Joke	8th	24	16	20	35	9	15	16	12	38	

=== Performance chart ===
Contestant	Week 1	Week 2	Week 3	Week 4	Week 5	Week 6	Week 7	Week 8	Week 9	Final
Martin Klinčúch	Adele	Kristína	Juraj Matyinkó; Maduar	Nicki Minaj	The Weeknd	George Michael	Dara Rolins	Justin Bieber	Netta	Marky Mark
Evelyn	Cardi B	Vojtěch Dyk; Nightwork	Július Satinský	Jennifer Lopez	Billy Ray Cyrus	Liza Minnelli	Hana Zagorová	Marilyn Monroe	Patrick Swayze	Madonna
Barbora Piešová	Chris Martin; Coldplay	Lukáš Adamec	Pink	Lady Gaga	Alice Cooper	Sia	Pavol Drapák; Metalinda	Sam Smith	Christina Aguilera	Whitney Houston
Dušan Cinkota	Jan Nedvěd	Věra Špinarová	Jason Derulo	Hana Hegerová	Václav Patejdl; Elán	Marilyn Manson	Petra Černocká	Michal Tučný	Jana Brejchová	Meryl Streep
Kristína Madarová	Tones and I	Peter Hrivňák; Horkýže Slíže	Shakira	Robert Kodym; Wanastowi Vjecy	Beth Ditto; Gossip	Patricia Kelly; The Kelly Family	Beáta Dubasová	Elvis Presley	Rihanna	Elton John
Braňo Mosný	Dolly Parton	Jožo Ráž; Elán	Tom Walker	Lady Gaga	Anthony Kiedis; Red Hot Chili Peppers	Missy Elliott	Richard Müller	Bono; U2	Anastacia	Nick Cave; Nick Cave and the Bad Seeds
Zuzana Belohorcová	Madonna	Pavol Hammel	Billie Eilish	Miro Jaroš	Britney Spears	Nina Hagen	Karol Duchoň	Pitbull	Dua Lipa	Kylie Minogue
Fero Joke	Jana Kocianová	Martin Višňovský; Chi liki tu-a	Kylie Minogue	Stephan Remmler; Trio	María Mendiola; Baccara	Sisa Sklovská	Michal David	Daniel Nekonečný	Eduard Khil	RuPaul

Color key:

indicates the contestant came first that week
indicates the contestant came last that week
indicates the contestant did not score

=== Guest performances ===
Episode	Guest	Performing as	Song title
1	Mário Kuly Kollár; Lujza Garajová Schrameková; Zuzana Kubovčíková Šebová; Marián Čekovský	Lunetic	„Chtěl bych tě líbat“ „Máma“
2	Rastislav Sokol; Andrej Bičan; Robo Papp	Kortina	„Bzum-Bzum Breke-Keke“
3	Martin Madej; Dávid Hartl; Patrik Vyskočil; Martin Harich; René Štúr	Spice Girls	„Spice Up Your Life“
5	Veronika Strapková; Veronika Krúpa Nízlová; Daniela Nízlová; Ivana Regešová; Mamba Dasha; Alexandra Gachulincová	The Pussycat Dolls	„Buttons“
10	Dávid Hartl	Susan Boyle	„You Raise Me Up“

== Season 7 - 2022 ==
This season was announced in Fall 2022 and started on September 4, 2022. In this Season, Martin Nikodým was the presenter. The Judges were Mário Kuly Kollár, Zuzana Kubovčíková Šebová, Marián Čekovský and Attila Végh. Due to the absence of the judges, guest judges appeared some weeks, such as Fero Joke, Jorge González, Ján Koleník or Marcel Forgáč. The winner was Viktória Ráková.

=== Contestants ===
Celebrity	Known for	Episodes won	Status
Simona Salátová	Comedian	once	Eliminated 1st on October 30, 2022
Matúš Kolárovský	Singer	once	Eliminated 2nd on October 30, 2022
Ondrej Kandráč	Singer	once	Eliminated 3rd on October 30, 2022
Natália Puklušová	Actress	twice	Eliminated 4th on October 30, 2022
Karol Tóth	Actor	once	Fourth place on November 6, 2022
Liv Bielovič	Actress	once	Third place on November 6, 2022
Adam Pavlovčin	Singer	once	Second place on November 6, 2022
Viktória Ráková	Actress	twice	Winner on November 6, 2022

=== Results chart ===
Tvoja tvár znie povedome (season 7) - Weekly scores
Celebrity	Place	Week 1	Week 2	Week 3	Week 4	Week 5	Week 6	Week 7	Week 8	Week 9	Final
Viktória Ráková	1st	22	18	29	30	35	16	36	17	29	232
Adam Pavlovčin	2nd	27	32	21	33	20	17	22	33	16	221
Liv Bielovič	3rd	26	32	27	25	27	18	39	22	25	241
Karol Tóth	4th	21	33	16	32	33	10	23	15	32	215
Natália Puklušová	5th	32	19	20	7	21	37	15	34	12	
Ondrej Kandráč	6th	10	25	12	14	19	32	10	21	45	
Matúš Kolárovský	7th	17	10	46	17	16	17	11	33	14	
Simona Salátová	8th	29	15	13	26	13	37	28	9	11	

=== Performance chart ===
Contestant	Week 1	Week 2	Week 3	Week 4	Week 5	Week 6	Week 7	Week 8	Week 9	Final
Viktória Ráková	Lucie Bílá	Dan Reynolds; Imagine Dragons	Madonna	Demi Lovato	Panjabi MC	Richard Fairbrass; Right Said Fred	Cass Elliot; The Mamas & the Papas	Ava Max	Lucie Vondráčková	Jennifer Lopez
Adam Pavlovčin	Lewis Capaldi	Dua Lipa	Harry Styles	Kate Bush	Elvis Presley	Cher	Petr Hapka	Sam Smith	Vec	Olly Alexander; Years & Years
Liv Bielovič	Lady Gaga	Montserrat Caballé	Prince	Pink	Olivia Newton-John	Michael Jackson	Miley Cyrus	Steven Tyler; Aerosmith	Peter Nagy	Taylor Swift
Karol Tóth	Katy Perry	Mika	Adele	Justin Timberlake	Damiano David; Måneskin	LP	Gusttavo Lima	Amy Winehouse	Marián Kochanský; Lojzo	Leonard Cohen
Natália Puklušová	Inva Mula	Christina Aguilera	Zac Efron	Petr Kotvald	Mabel	Sia	Dexter Holland; The Offspring	Tina Turner	Ego	Lil Jon
Ondrej Kandráč	Victor Willis; Village People	Billie Eilish	Martin Mihalčín; Heľenine oči	Ivan Tásler; IMT Smile	Helena Vondráčková	Chris Norman; Smokie	Marián Čekovský	Michal David	Robo Kazík	Daniel Nekonečný
Matúš Kolárovský	Rihanna	Ibrahim Maiga	Lil Nas X	Nicki Minaj	Pitbull	Jaroslav Bobowski; Premier	Liz Mitchell; Boney M.	MC Hammer	Peter Hrivňák; Horkýže Slíže	Usher
Simona Salátová	Martin Kittner	Gizka Oňová	Liza Minnelli	Martin Madej	Jeffrey Jey; Eiffel 65	Weird Al Yankovic	Eva Máziková	Tom Jones	Ivan Mládek; Banjo Band	Dano

Color key:

indicates the contestant came first that week
indicates the contestant came last that week
indicates the contestant did not score

=== Guest performances ===
Episode	Guest	Performing as	Song title
2	Nela Pocisková; Mamba Dasha	Michael Jackson; Janet Jackson	„Scream“
4	Mária Čírová; Zoe Kachútová	Pink; Willow Sage Hart	„Cover Me In Sunshine“
7	Fero Joke	Yvetta Simonová	„Whisky, to je moje gusto“
10	Fero Joke; All Judges; All Coaches; Gipsy Čáve	Gipsy Čáve	„Ona ľúbi pomaranče“

== Ratings ==
Season	Week 1	Week 2	Week 3	Week 4	Week 5	Week 6	Week 7	Week 8	Week 9	Final
1	628 000 (March 6, 2016)	615 000 (March 13, 2016)	562 000 (March 20, 2016)	670 000 (March 27, 2016)	703 000 (April 3, 2016)	771 000 (April 10, 2016)	714 000 (April 17, 2016)	806 000 (April 24, 2016)	695 000 (April 27, 2016)	841 000 (May 1, 2016)
2	549 000 (September 4, 2016)	536 000 (September 11, 2016)	520 000 (September 18, 2016)	448 000 (September 25, 2016)	520 000 (October 2, 2016)	588 000 (October 9, 2016)	553 000 (October 16, 2016)	480 000 (October 15, 2016)	488 000 (October 30, 2016)	515 000 (November 6, 2016)
3	469 000 (March 5, 2017)	468 000 (March 12, 2017)	448 000 (March 19, 2017)	467 000 (March 26, 2017)	447 000 (April 2, 2017)	395 000 (April 9, 2017)	489 000 (April 16, 2017)	442 000 (April 23, 2017)	433 000 (April 30, 2017)	416 000 (May 8, 2017)
4	458 000 (September 9, 2018)	457 000 (September 16, 2018)	472 000 (September 23, 2018)	472 000 (September 30, 2018)	429 000 (October 7, 2018)	446 000 (October 14, 2018)	474 000 (October 21, 2018)	474 000 (October 28, 2018)	435 000 (November 4, 2018)	536 000 (November 11, 2018)
5	450 000 (September 8, 2019)	412 000 (September 15, 2019)	373 000 (September 22, 2019)	(September 29, 2019)	(October 6, 2019)	(October 13, 2019)	(October 20, 2019)	(October 27, 2019)	(November 3, 2019)	518 000 (November 10, 2019)
6	563 000 (March 7, 2021)	529 000 (March 14, 2021)	582 000 (March 21, 2021)	511 000 (March 28, 2021)	508 000 (April 4, 2021)	526 000 (April 11, 2021)	556 000 (April 18, 2021)	537 000 (April 25, 2021)	513 000 (May 2, 2021)	538 000 (May 9, 2021)
7	318 000 (September 4, 2022)	329 000 (September 11, 2022)	(September 18, 2022)	323 000 (September 25, 2022)	336 000 (October 2, 2022)	320 000 (October 9, 2022)	(October 16, 2022)	280 000 (October 23, 2022)	253 000 (October 30, 2022)	(November 6, 2022)
