= Zuzana Vačková =

Slovak actress (born 1969)

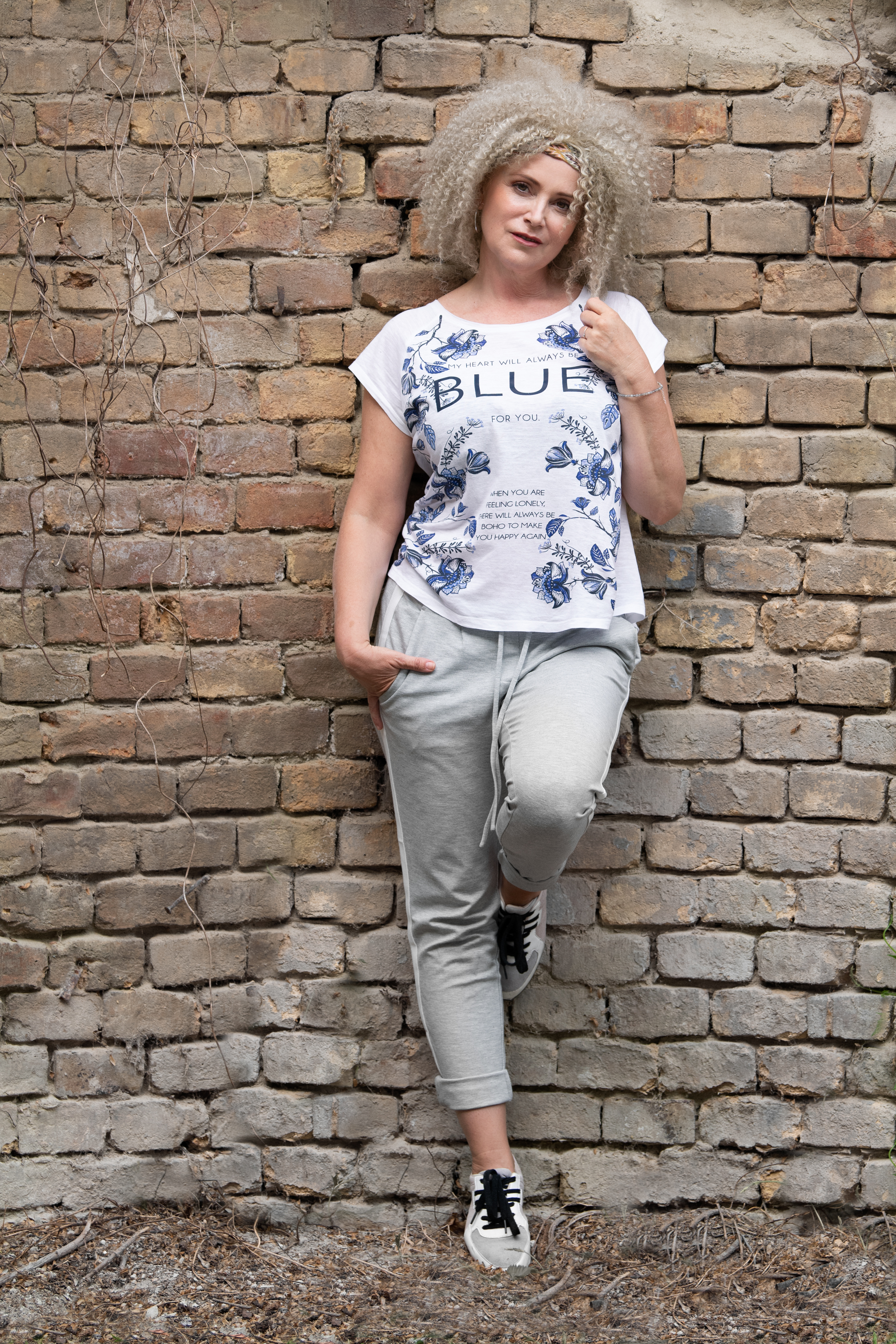
- Vačková in 2019
- Born: Zuzana Vačková; 12 February 1969 (age 56); Nitra, Czechoslovakia
- Occupation: Actress
- Years active: 1981–present
- Known for: Panelák

Zuzana Vačková (born 12 February 1969) is a Slovak actress best known for her role in the television series Panelák.

== Life and career ==
=== Early life ===
Zuzana Vačková was born in Nitra, a historical town in Western Slovakia. Shortly after her birth, her family moved to Prievidza. They later moved once more, this time to Bratislava.

=== Acting and studies ===
Vačková has stated that acting happened to her by accident. Instead of enrolling in a Slovak-language course, as was her plan, she ended up taking drama. Shortly after she started attending the course, it was visited by Štefan Uher, a well-known Slovak director, who was looking for a young actress to play a role in his new movie Kosenie Jastrabej lúky (1981). Vačková won the audition, and thus got her first acting role, in a film associated with the Czechoslovak New Wave. The performance opened many new opportunities for her, both in film and television. A few months later, she starred in her first television movie, Pulzovanie nášho vesmíru, which aired in 1982. This movie also marks the first time she met her future husband, Rastislav Rogel.

While already active in films, Vačková also managed to finish secondary school, and was accepted to the Academy of Performing Arts in Bratislava (VŠMU) in 1987. During this time, she continued to perform, appearing in a number of films, including a Russian production. One of her most notable roles from this period was in the Czech-language film Sedmé nebe (1987), which dealt with many controversial topics such as abortion; corruption; nepotism; generational differences; and lack of intimacy, honesty, and love in familial and human relationships.

In addition to her work in film and television, Vačková also performed in theatre, and she began garnering attention from critics.

At the Academy, her classmates included Zuzana Mauréry, Dagmar Bruckmayerová, Silvia Vargová, and many other actors who went on to become household names.

Vačková graduated from the Academy in 1991, and married her classmate Rastislav Rogel the same year. A year later, she gave birth to her first child, Jakub. The couple parted after six years. During this time, Vačková began doing voice acting on the side, dubbing foreign films into Slovak, and she also took other jobs, such as working in a flower shop and waitressing. Between 2009 and 2014, she had a regular role in the television series Panelák.

In 2016, she participated in the reality television show Tvoja tvár znie povedome (based on Your Face Sounds Familiar), where she won one episode with "The Shoop Shoop Song" by Cher.

=== Other activities ===
Vačková is a member of various charity groups, such as Parasport 24, which supports handicapped athletes in Slovakia. She is also on the board of directors of the Linaje Foundation, which supports autistic and abused women. Members of this foundation have released a book titled Rozprávky z Ôsmeho svetadielu in order to raise funds for a residential facility for children and adults on the autism spectrum, in Borová.

Vačková teaches acting at the Conservatory in Bratislava.

In 2017, she co-wrote the book Po anglicky so Zuzkou Vačkovou (In English with Zuzka Vačková) with actress Karin Haydu.

== Selected filmography ==
=== Film ===
List of film appearances, with year, title, and role shown
Year	Title	Role	Notes
1981	Kosenie Jastrabej lúky	Anička	
1986	Kohút nezaspieva	Fanka	
1986	Šiesta veta	Olga	
1987	Sedmé nebe	Slávka	

=== Television ===
List of television appearances, with year, title, and role shown
Year	Title	Role	Notes
1982	Pulzovanie nášho vesmíru	Zdena	TV movie
1984	Falošný princ	Court lady	TV movie
2007–12	Ordinácia v ružovej záhrade		
2009–10	V mene zákona		
2009–14	Panelák	Alica Rybáriková	956 episodes
2012–13	Dr. Dokonalý		
2016	Tvoja tvár znie povedome	Herself	Reality show
2020	Oteckovia		
2021	Bodka		
