= List of Slovak television series =

The following is a list of television series produced in Slovakia:

== 0-9 ==
- 112

== A ==
- A je to...
- Aféry
- Ako som prežil
- Alžbetin dvor
- Áno, miláčik!

== B ==
- Bambuľkine dobrodružstvá
- Búrlivé víno

== D ==
- Detektív Kripta
- Dr. Ludsky
- Duchovia

== K ==
- Keby bolo keby
- Kriminálka Staré mesto
- Kutyil s.r.o

== M ==
- Mafstory
- Medzi nami
- Mesto tieňov

== N ==
- Naši
- Normálna rodinka
- Nový život

== O ==
- Obchod so šťastím
- Odsúdené
- Ordinácia v ružovej záhrade
- Oteckovia

== P ==
- Panelák
- Priateľky
- Profesionáli
- Prvé oddelenie

== R ==
- Rádio Fresh
- Rodinné tajomstvá

== S ==
- Silvánovci
- Spadla z oblakov (Czechoslovakia 1978, Slovak language)
- Susedia
- Sestričky

== V ==
- V mene zákona
- Veľké srdce

== Z ==
- Záchranári
- Zborovňa

== See also ==
- OTO award for TV series
