= Marián Miezga =

Slovak actor

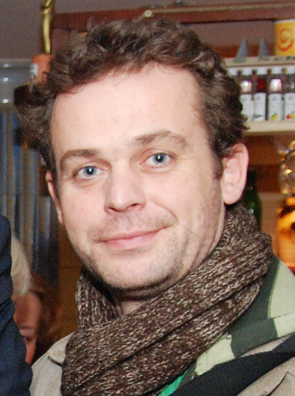
- Miezga in 2010
- Born: 30 October 1974 (age 51); Bratislava, Czechoslovakia
- Occupation: Actor
- Years active: 1999–present

Marián Miezga (born 30 October 1974) is a Slovak actor. He was recognised at the 1998 DOSKY Awards as Discovery of the Year as part of the performance of Na koho to slovo padne. Although mainly known for his television roles on Slovak TV channels RTVS and TV JOJ, he joined the cast of Markíza's Oteckovia in 2018 as Juraj Šípka.

== Selected filmography ==
- S.O.S. (television, 2004)
- Panelák (television, 2008–2014)
- Mesto tieňov (television, 2008)
- Partička (television, 2009)
- Oteckovia (television, 2018)
- Přes prsty (2019)
