= Slávik Awards =

Former Slovak music awards

Slávik
- Awarded for: Popularity in the Slovak music industry
- Country: Slovakia
- First award: 1998
- Final award: 2012

Slávik (English: "nightingale") was a Slovak music poll and award established by the company Forza—which organizes the Miss Slovakia beauty pageant—in 1998, as a successor to Czechoslovakia's Zlatý slavík, which ran from 1962 until 1991. The annual event was broadcast live through the television channels Markíza from 1998 to 2010 and TV JOJ from 2011 until 2012. Forza dissolved the event a year later due to declining interest. In the poll's previous years, victory had been conditional on receiving at least 34,000 votes, which in the final years had dropped to 5,000. Czechia, formerly part of Czechoslovakia, has its own music award, known as Český slavík (English: "Czech nightingale").

== Winners ==
=== Major awards ===
Year	Male Singer			Female Singer			Band			Ref
Year	Gold	Silver	Bronze	Gold	Silver	Bronze	Gold	Silver	Bronze	Ref
1998	Pavol Habera	Robo Kazík	Miro Žbirka	Barbara Haščáková	Marika Gombitová	Marcela Laiferová	Elán	Senzus	Noga & Skrúcaný	
1999	Pavol Habera	Richard Müller	Robo Kazík	Jana Kirschner	Barbara Haščáková	Marika Gombitová	Elán	IMT Smile	Senzus	
2000	Jožo Ráž	Pavol Habera	Richard Müller	Jana Kirschner	Marika Gombitová	Barbara Haščáková	Elán	IMT Smile	Senzus	
2001	Jožo Ráž	Pavol Habera	Richard Müller	Jana Kirschner	Marika Gombitová	Katarína Hasprová	Elán	No Name	Inekafe	
2002	Miro Žbirka	Jožo Ráž	Pavol Habera	Jana Kirschner	Marika Gombitová	Jadranka	Elán	No Name	Senzus	
2003	Richard Müller	Miro Žbirka	Jožo Ráž	Misha	Jana Kirschner	Jadranka	Elán	No Name	Horkýže Slíže	
2004	Miro Žbirka	Jožo Ráž	Richard Müller	Misha	Jana Kirschner	Jadranka	Elán	No Name	Desmod	
2005	Miro Žbirka	Richard Müller	Pavol Habera	Zuzana Smatanová	Marika Gombitová	Jana Kirschner	Elán	No Name	Desmod	
2006	Peter Cmorik	Miro Žbirka	Pavol Habera	Zuzana Smatanová	Katarína Knechtová	Marika Gombitová	Desmod	Peha	Elán	
2007	Peter Cmorik	Miro Žbirka	Mário "Kully" Kollár	Zuzana Smatanová	Katarína Knechtová	Zdenka Predná	Desmod	Elán	Peha	
2008	Peter Cmorik	Mário "Kully" Kollár	Miro Žbirka	Zuzana Smatanová	Katarína Knechtová	Zdenka Predná	Desmod	Elán	No Name	
2009	Peter Cmorik	Miro Žbirka	Richard Müller	Zuzana Smatanová	Jana Kirschner	Katarína Knechtová	Desmod	Elán	Gladiator	
2010	Richard Müller	Peter Cmorik	Miro Žbirka	Zuzana Smatanová	Tina	Jana Kirschner	Desmod	Elán	IMT Smile	
2011	Richard Müller	Peter Cmorik	Miro Žbirka	Tina	Zuzana Smatanová	Katarína Knechtová	Desmod	IMT Smile	Elán	
2012	Peter Cmorik	Miro Žbirka	Richard Müller	Tina	Celeste Buckingham	Zuzana Smatanová	Desmod	IMT Smile	Elán	

==== Leaders ====
With eight awards within the major categories, Elán was the most successful band in the poll's history, followed by Desmod and Zuzana Smatanová, who received a total of seven and six gold trophies, respectively.

Rank	1st	2nd	3rd
Artist	Elán	Desmod	Zuzana Smatanová
Total awards	8	7	6

=== Other categories ===
Year	New Artist	Top Climber	Radio Artist	Song	Video	Website	Top Artist	Year
1998	Not awarded							
1999	Inekafe	Polemic	Elán					
2000	Robo Papp	Inekafe	Elán					
2001	Jadranka	Nocadeň	Gladiator					
2002	Misha	Cinno	Miro Žbirka					
2003	Desmod	Andy Ďurica	IMT Smile					
2004	Emily	Robo Grigorov	G8					
2005	Katka Koščová	Taktici	Desmod, Zuzana Smatanová					
2006	Peter Cmorik	AYA	Desmod					
2007	Komajota	Marcel Palonder	Desmod					
2008	Adam Ďurica	Metropolis	IMT Smile					
2009	Horská chata	Mária Čírová	Jana Kirschner					
2010	Ján Mitaľ	Good Fancy	Kristína				Zuzana Smatanová	
2011	Majk Spirit	Lukáš Adamec	IMT Smile				Desmod	
2012	Celeste Buckingham	Peter Bič Projekt	EGO ft. Robert Burian	"Žijeme len raz" (by EGO ft. Robert Burian)		Zuzana Smatanová	Desmod	
