= Slovak television =

Slovak television may refer to:

- Television in Slovakia, lists of television channels in Slovakia
- Slovenská televízia, a state-owned public television organization in Slovakia, 1991–2011

== See also ==
- List of Slovak television series
- Radio and Television of Slovakia
