= Mária Bartalos =

Slovak actress (born 1994)

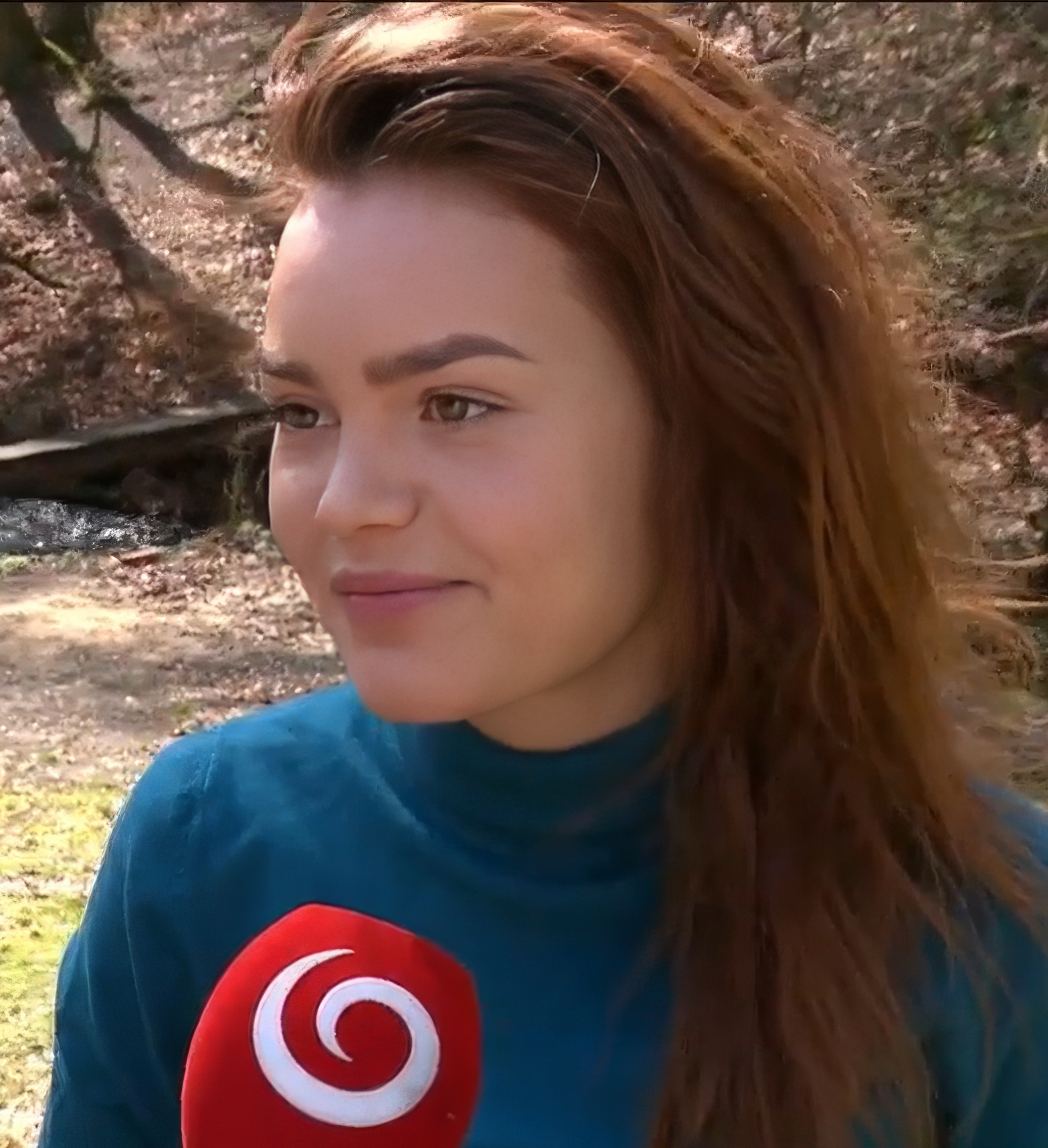
- Mária Bartalos in 2019
- Born: Mária Havranová; 22 June 1994 (age 31); Čajkov, Slovakia
- Occupation: Actress
- Years active: 2008–2022
- Children: 2

Mária Bartalos (née Havranová; born 22 June 1994) is a Slovak former actress. During the 2010s she played many roles on Slovak television series, including Linda Mackova in Markíza comedy-drama Oteckovia. Bartalos has appeared in Slovak and Czech films such as the 2018 dance film Backstage, in which she had a leading role.

== Acting career ==
Havranová appeared in television series including Panelák, Aféry, Kukučka, and Oteckovia in the 2010s. In 2018 she participated in the Slovak reality television show Tvoja tvár znie povedome. She was part of the main cast for Oteckovia, playing schoolteacher Linda Mackova until leaving during its third series as she announced that she was pregnant: the last episode containing her was broadcast in March 2019.

She had a leading role in Andrea Sedláčková's 2018 dance film Backstage. In 2019 Bartalos appeared in the horror film Trhlina, directed by Peter Bebjak. The same year Bartalos was part of the main cast for the Czech tragicomedy film On the Roof. In 2022 Bartalos appeared in Markíza television show Výnimočná Nikol.

=== Stage acting ===
Although she acted on stage during the 2010s, she was not a permanent member of any theatres. Havranová acted at the Slovak National Theatre in Bratislava, alternating for Petra Vajdová as leading lady Grófka Elisa Hrabovská in the Ján Palárik play "Zmierenie alebo Dobrodružstvo pri obžinkoch".

== Personal life ==
Havranová married fitness instructor Adrián Bartalos in 2018, becoming known as Mária Bartalos, Mária Bartalos Havranová, or Mary Bartaloš. She has two sons with her husband.

== Filmography ==
- Panelák (television)
- Aféry (television, 2011)
- Pod povrchom (television, 2012)
- Kukučka (television, 2015)
- Inspektor Max (television, 2018)
- Backstage (2018)
- Oteckovia (television, 2018–2019)
- Trhlina (2019)
- On the Roof (2019)
- Výnimočná Nikol (television, 2022)
