= Dominika Kavaschová =

Slovak actress

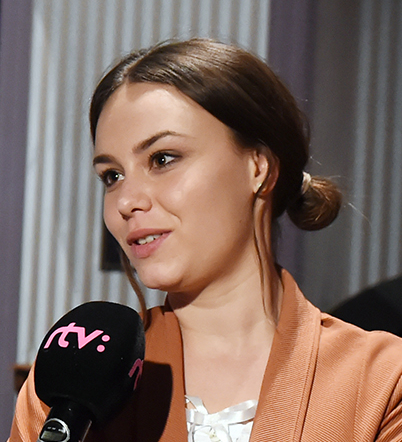
- Kavaschová in 2016
- Born: 19 May 1989 (age 36); Košice, Czechoslovakia (now Slovakia)
- Occupation: Actress
- Years active: 2009–present

Dominika Kavaschová (born 19 May 1989) is a Slovak actress. At the 2013 DOSKY Awards she was awarded the Discovery of the Year title. At the DOSKY Awards in 2015, she won in the category of Best Actress, for her performances in the play Mojmír II. alebo Súmrak ríše, directed by Rastislav Ballek. Kavaschová has German ancestry.

== Selected filmography ==
- Odsúdené (television, 2010)
- Panelák (television, 2010–2013)
- Oteckovia (television, 2018–present)
