= Barbora Piešová =

Slovak singer

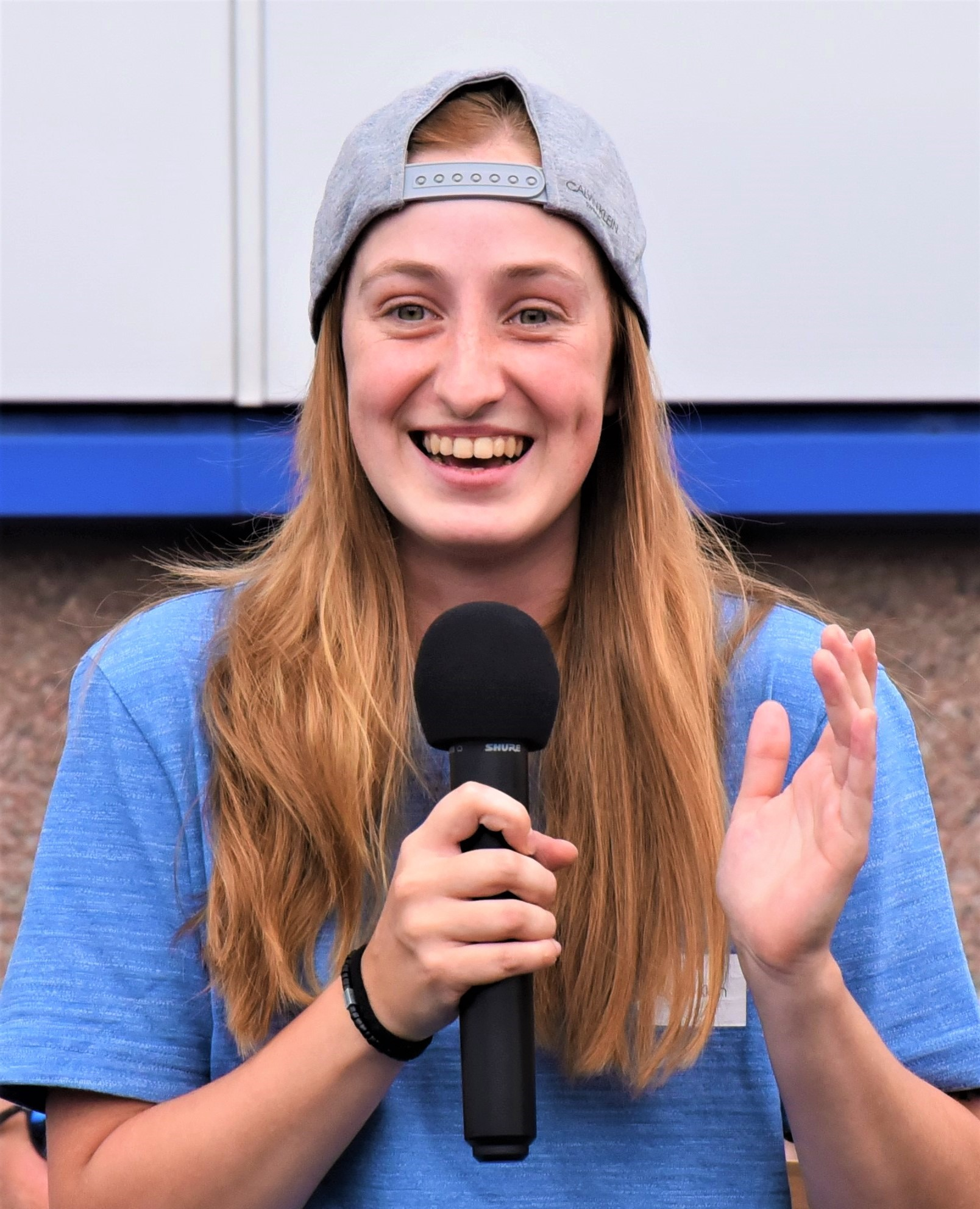

Background information
- Born: 26 June 2000 (age 26); Poruba, Slovakia
- Genres: Pop
- Instruments: Guitar, piano
- Years active: 2019–present
- Label: Warner Music
- Website: barborapiesova.com

Barbora Piešová (born 26 June 2000) is a Slovak singer who won 6th season of the Czech&Slovak SuperStar, a local itineration of the Idol franchise singing competition. She finished third in the 2021 edition of the show Tvoja tvár znie povedome.

== Early career ==
Piešová grew up in the village Poruba, nearby the town of Prievidza. She was the youngest out of four sisters. Her sister, Lenka, is also a singer and competed in the show Česko Slovensko má talent in 2010. Lenka's example served as an inspiration for Barbora to take vocal lessons.

From an early age, Piešová participated in singing competitions in Slovakia and the Czech Republic. In 2019, she graduated from High School and started working in a local window making factory in Prievidza. She also started uploading her songs on YouTube, receiving a large number of views.

== SuperStar and beyond ==
Piešová competed in the sixth season of the SuperStar in 2020, singing "Next to Me" by Imagine Dragons during the initial casting. After advancing through several selection rounds with her performances of "Runaway Baby" by Bruno Mars, Come Together by the Beatles as well as "V slepých uličkách" by Marika Gombitová and Miroslav Žbirka, she advanced to semi-finals with "I will survive" by Gloria Gaynor and final round.

Piešová sang Somebody to Love" by Queen in the first round. In the super-finals on 31 March 2020, she sang "I'm So Excited" by The Pointer Sisters and Richarda Müllera's song "Milovanie v daždi". Piešová performed "Next to Me again" in the final round, winning the competition by receiving 32.5% of the votes.

Warner Music released a compilation of Piešová's songs from the show under the title Barbora Piešová: Superstar in 2020.

In January 2021, Piešová competed in the reality showTvoja tvár znie povedome, finishing third place with "Queen of the Night" by Whitney Houston.
