= List of Oteckovia episodes =

The Slovak television series Oteckovia consists of 5 seasons, plus one special program. Oteckovia started airing on January 1, 2018 on Markíza. The series renowned for Christmas special program dedicated to Christmas. Markíza halted broadcasting the series in mid-2020, in response to COVID-19 pandemic precautions. As a result, the series available for four days, excluding Fridays, on March 13, 2020, and ultimately reduced broadcasting days up to Wednesday, during the first segment of season 3. Oteckovia's seasons composed of two segments. The season 5 was premiered on January 10, 2022.

== Series overview ==
Season	Episodes	Originally aired		Timeslot (CET)	Network
Season	Episodes	First aired	Last aired	Timeslot (CET)	Network
1	110	January 1, 2018	June 7, 2018	Monday 18:10 (pilot part) Monday–Friday 17:55	Markíza
1	69	September 3, 2018	December 7, 2018	Monday – Friday 17:55 Friday 17:55	Markíza
Christmas with Dads		December 24, 2018		Monday 19:00	Markíza
2	110	January 14, 2019	June 14, 2019	Monday – Friday 17:55	Markíza
2	70	September 2, 2019	December 6, 2019	Monday – Friday 17:55	Markíza
Christmas miracle		December 24, 2019		Tuesday 18:45	Markíza
3	53	January 13, 2020	April 1, 2020	Monday – Friday 17:55 (1 –40) Monday – Thursday 17:55 (41–44) Monday – Wednesday 17:55 (45 – 53)	Markíza
3	70	August 31, 2020	December 4, 2020	Monday – Friday 17:55	Markíza
Christmas special		December 18, 2020		Friday 20:30	Markíza
4	110	January 11, 2021	June 11, 2021	Monday – Friday 17:55	Markíza
4	70	August 30, 2021	December 3, 2021	Monday – Friday 17:55	Markíza
Christmas surprise		December 24, 2021		Friday 19:00	Markíza
5	110	January 10, 2022	June 10, 2022	Monday – Friday 17:55	Markíza

== Parts ==
No. overall	No. in season	Title	Directed by	Written by	Original release date	Slovak viewers (millions)	Online viewers
