= Viktória Ráková =

Slovak actress (born 1981)

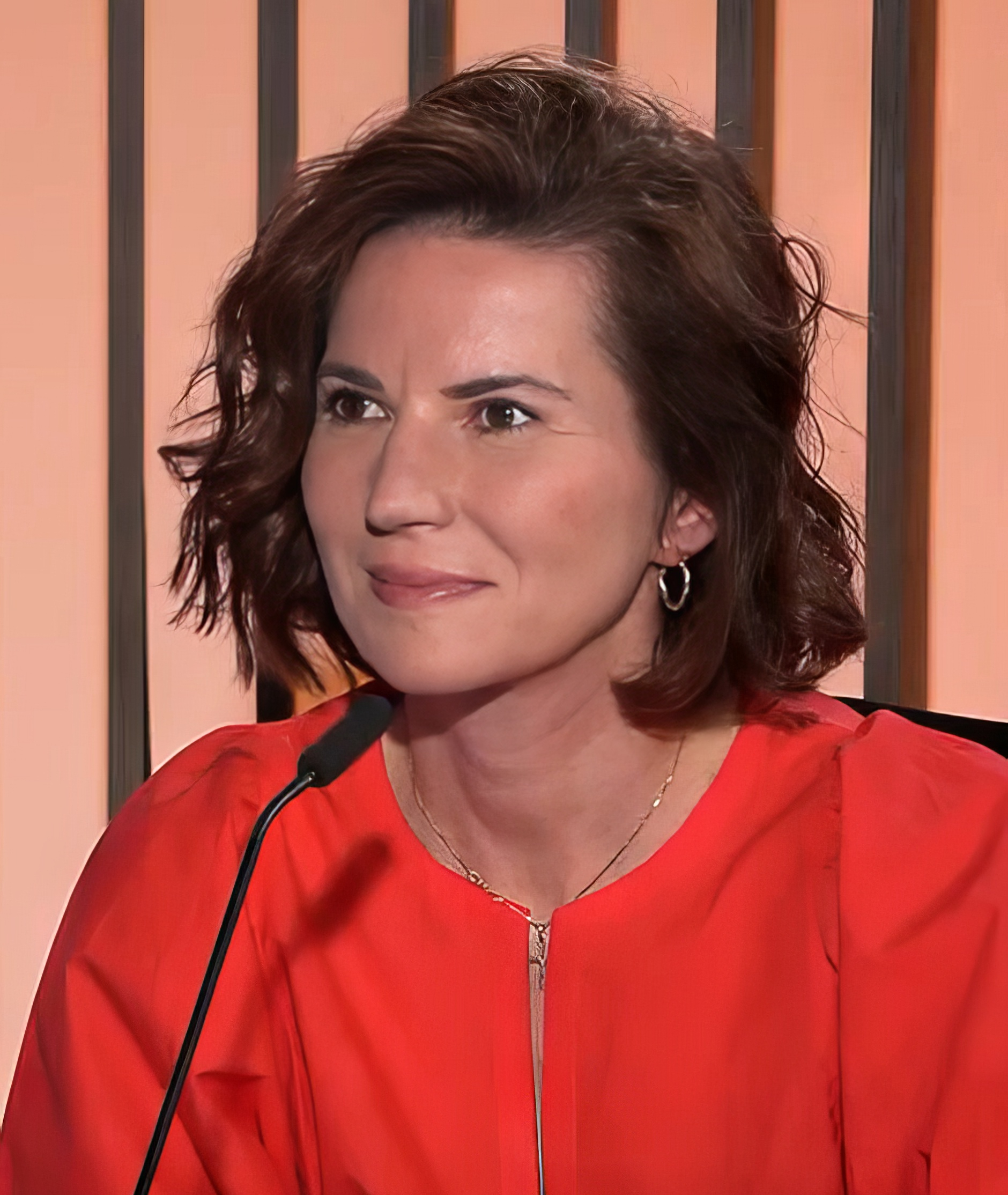
- Viktória Ráková in Ondrej Kandráč's podcast (TV JOJ) in 2023
- Born: 15 March 1981 (age 45); Rimavská Sobota, Czechoslovakia
- Education: Academy of Performing Arts in Bratislava
- Occupation: Actress
- Spouse: Róbert Lakatos
- Children: 2

Viktória Ráková Lakatos (born 15 March 1981) is a Slovak television and theatre actress. She is best known for starring in the TV Shows Panelák and Susedia.

== Biography ==
Viktória Ráková was born on 15 March 1981 in Rimavská Sobota. She is of Hungarian ethnicity. She studied acting at the Academy of Performing Arts in Bratislava, graduating in 2006. Following graduation, Ráková became a member of the Hungarian-language Thália theatre in Košice.

From 2008 to 2022 she was a cast member of the TV Show Susedia, for which she was twice nominated for the OTO Award for TV Female Actor. In addition, she appeared in the shows Panelák and Kutyl s.r.o. In 2022 she became the winner of the reality show Tvoja tvár znie povedome.

Ráková has two sons with her husband, the musician Róbert Lakatos. They reside in the village of Chotín. Her brother Róbert Rák is a former footballer.
