= Zuzana Tlučková =

Slovak actress (born 1962)

- Born: 9 February 1962 (age 64); Košice, Czechoslovakia
- Education: Academy of Performing Arts in Bratislava
- Occupations: Stage and television Actress
- Spouse: Štefan Skrúcaný (m. 1986; div. 2008)
- Children: 2

Zuzana Tlučková (born 9 February 1962) is a Slovak comedian and theatre and television actress.

== Biography ==
Zuzana Tlučková was born on 9 February 1962 in Košice. Since early childhood, she performed in television shows for children. She studied acting at the Academy of Performing Arts in Bratislava, graduating in 1984. Already as a student, she started acting at the New Scene theatre. In the early 1990s, she left the theatre and became an independent actress.

In the 1990s, Tlučková was known mainly known as a comedian. From 1996 to 1999 she was a part of the cast of the popular humorous TV Show Telecvoking. She was also active in dubbing, winning recognition for her dubbing of the main character of the Mexican telenovela Simplemente María.

In the 2000s and 2010s, Tlučková appeared in popular TV shows Neighbors (2006-2007), Panelák (2011-2015) and Neighbors (from 2018). In 2006, 2007 and 2011 she was nominated for the OTO Award for TV Female Actor.

Between 1986 and 2008 she was married to the actor Štefan Skrúcaný. They have two sons together.
