= Zuzana Haasová =

Slovak actress and singer

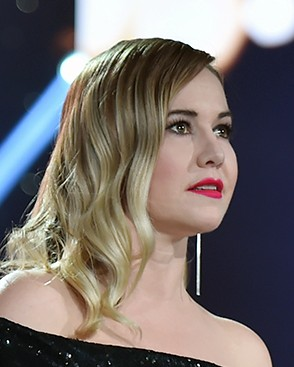
- Haasová in 2017
- Born: 20 March 1981 (age 45); Bratislava, Czechoslovakia (now Slovakia)
- Occupation: Actress
- Years active: 1989–present
- Website: http://www.haasova.sk

Zuzana Haasová (born 20 March 1981) is a Slovak actress and singer. She studied at the Bratislava Conservatory. Haasová played Soňa Jančová in the Slovak soap Panelák between 2008 and 2015. She performs music as part of the Susie Haas Band. Haasová has type 1 diabetes. She is the youngest of three sisters.

== Selected filmography ==
- Najmenší hrdinovia (television, 1989)
- Dvadsaťštyri hodín zo života istej ženy (TV film, 1994)
- Pod vŕbou (TV film, 1994)
- O krásnej strige (TV film, 1994)
- O Zorali a dvoch bratoch (1994)
- Škriatok (1995)
- Silvánovci (1996)
- Duchovia (1997)
- Cruel Joys (2002)
- Ordinácia v ružovej záhrade (television, 2007)
- Panelák (television, 2008–2015)
- Rex (television, 2017)
