= Zuzana Šebová =

Slovak actress

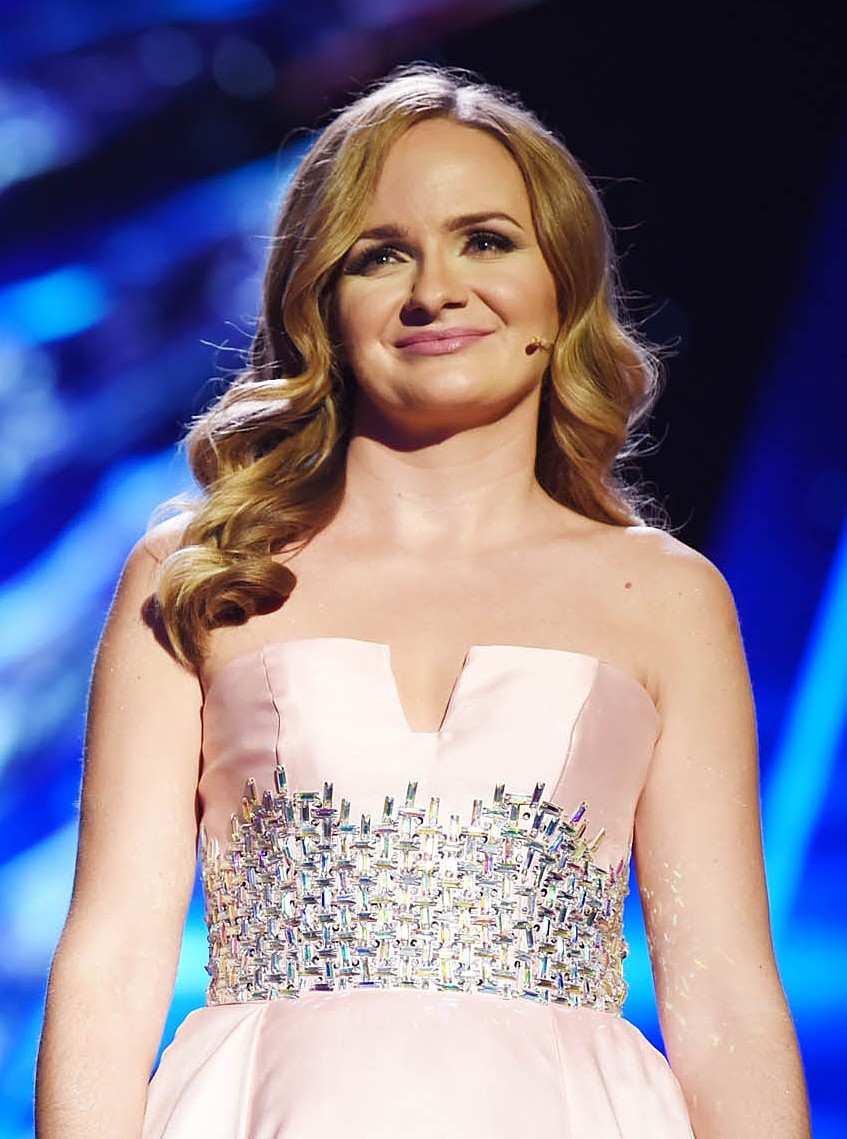
- Šebová in 2016
- Born: 1 April 1982 (age 42); Žiar nad Hronom, Czechoslovakia
- Occupation: Actress
- Years active: 2003-present

Zuzana Šebová (born 1 April 1982) is a Slovak actress. She won the OTO Award for TV Female Actor in 2014 and 2015. She married Michal Kubovcik, a Slovak actor, in 2017.

== Selected filmography ==
- Panelák (television, 2008)
- Odsúdené (television, 2009)
- V mene zákona (television, 2009)
- Aféry (television, 2010)
- Dr. Dokonalý (television, 2012)
- Slovensko 2.0 (2014)
- Horná Dolná (television, 2015)
- Zoo (television, 2015)
