= Lojzo =

Slovak folk band

Lojzo (also LOJZO) is a folk music group from Bratislava, Slovakia. It was formed in 1982 in Czechoslovakia by Marián Kochanský. The name is a backronym for "Ľudový Orchester Jednoduchej Zábavy Obyvateľstva" ("Folk orchestra for simple entertainment of population"). At the same time "Lojzo" is a diminutive form of the name Alojz (i.e., Aloysius, Lewis).

In 1987, the Czechoslovak popularity chart Zlatý Slavík placed the group 22nd (6th among Slovak musicians), and in 1998 the Slovak Slávik Awards placed it 4th.

== Discography ==
- LOJZO (1985) LP
- My nič, my muzikanti (1987) LP
- Ticho po plešine (1989) LP, CD
- LOJZO IV (1991) LP, CD
- Laz Vegaz (1996) LP, CD
- Lojzo 2010 (2010) CD

== See also ==
- The 100 Greatest Slovak Albums of All Time
