= Gabriela Dzuríková =

Slovak actress (born 1973)

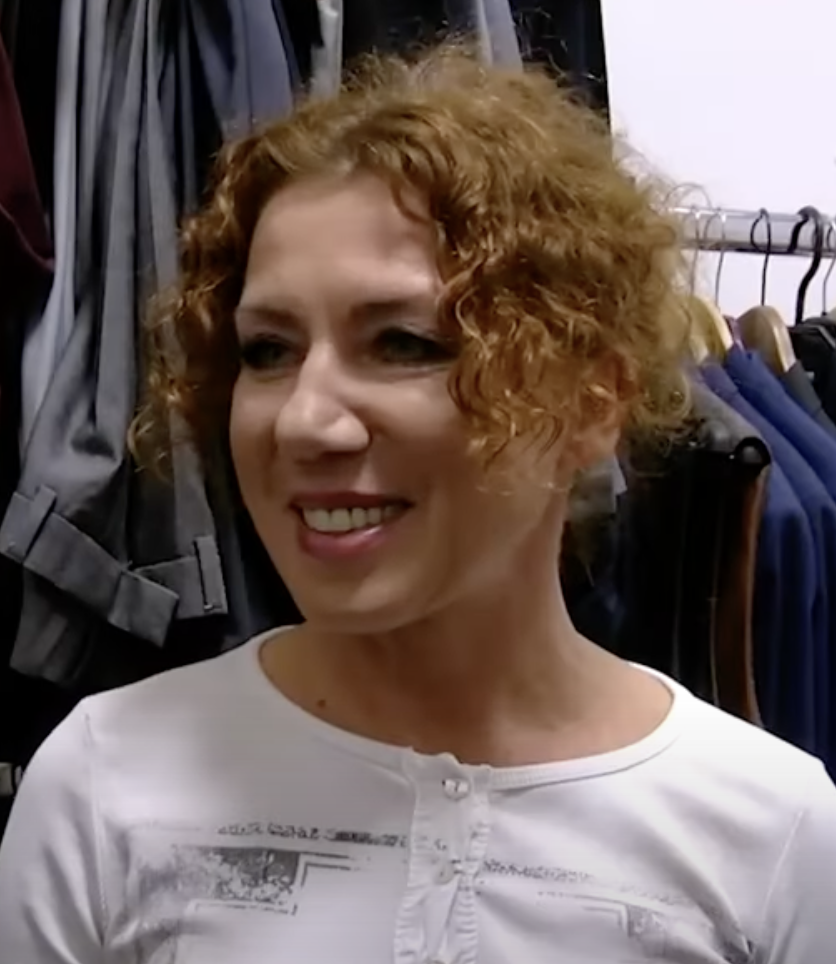
- Gabriela Dzuríková in 2022
- Born: 18 March 1973 (age 53); Košice, Czechoslovakia
- Education: Academy of Performing Arts in Bratislava
- Occupation: Actress

Gabriela Dzuríková (born 18 March 1973) is a Slovak actress.

== Biography ==
Gabriela Dzúriková was born on 18 March 1973 in Košice. She studied acting at the Academy of Performing Arts in Bratislava.

Already as a student, Dzúriková appeared in plays at the Slovak National Theatre. Following graduation, she successfully applied for a permanent role at the theatre following the urging of the actor Martin Huba. As of 2024, she is still a member of the cast at the Slovak National Theatre.

In addition to stage acting she appeared in a large number of television series, including Odsúdené (2009) and Oteckovia (2022). Dzúriková occasionally appeared in feature films. She debuted on the big screen in the first Slovak film depicting LGBT relationships Hannah and Her Brothers (2001). In 2015 she appeared in the drama Eva Nová.
