= Lina Mayer =

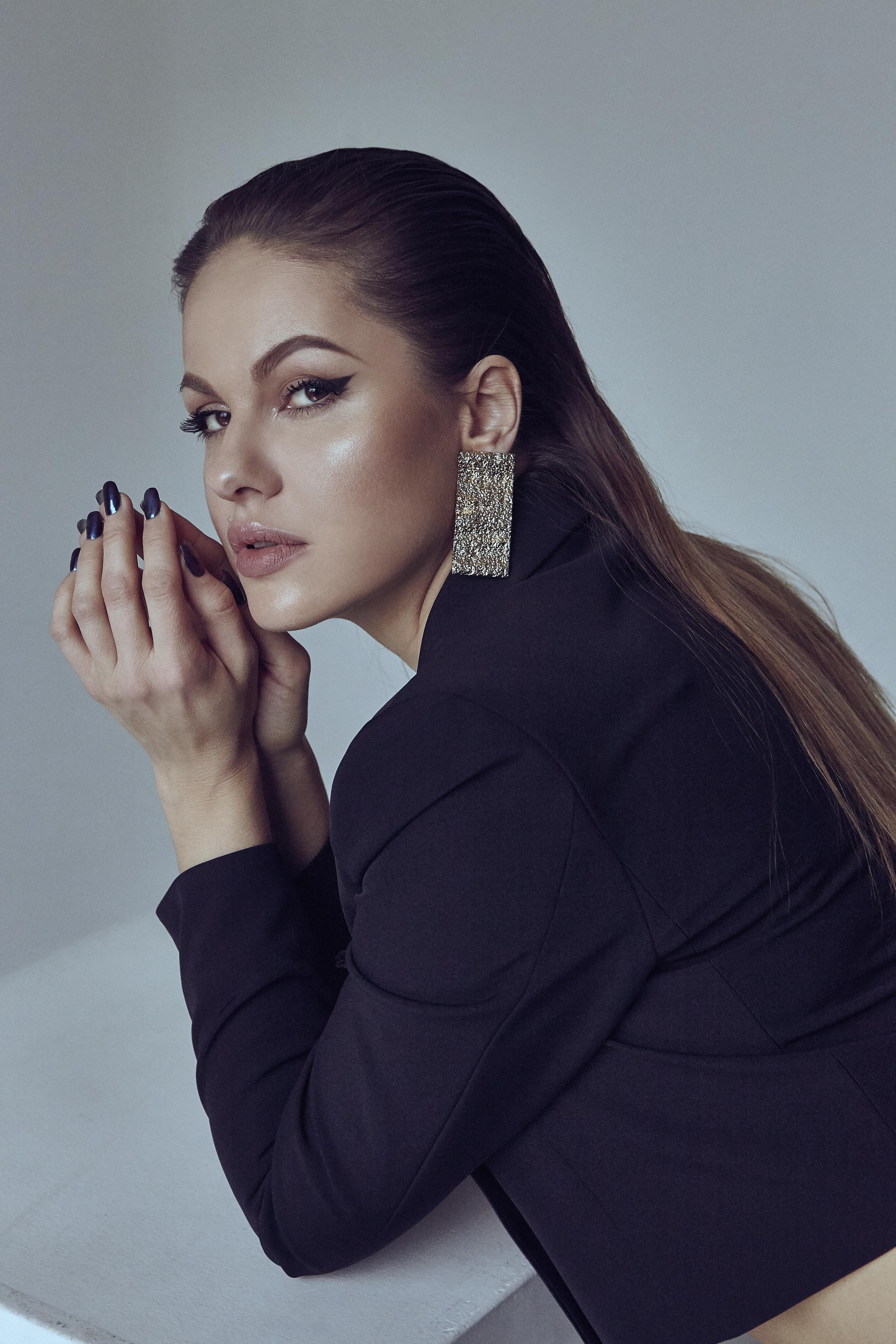

Background information
- Born: Karolína Majerníková; Košice, Czechoslovakia (nowadays Slovakia)
- Genres: Pop
- Occupations: Singer, dancer
- Years active: 2012–present
- Website: Lina Mayer

Karolína Majerníková, known professionally as Lina Mayer, is a Slovak singer and dancer.

== Discography ==
Studio albums (solo)

- 2015: Lina Mayer - EP

=== Singles ===
Title	Year	Peak chart positions	Album
Title	Year	SNS IFPI	Album
"Dream."	2012	-	-
"This Time"	2015	-	Lina Mayer - EP
"Tell Me Why"	2015	-	Lina Mayer - EP
"Personal Sky"	2015	11	Lina Mayer - EP
"Nothing"	2015	TBD	TBA
"Don't leave me now"	2017	TBD	TBA
"Falling"	2018	TBD	TBA
