= Dušan Cinkota =

Slovak voice actor and actor

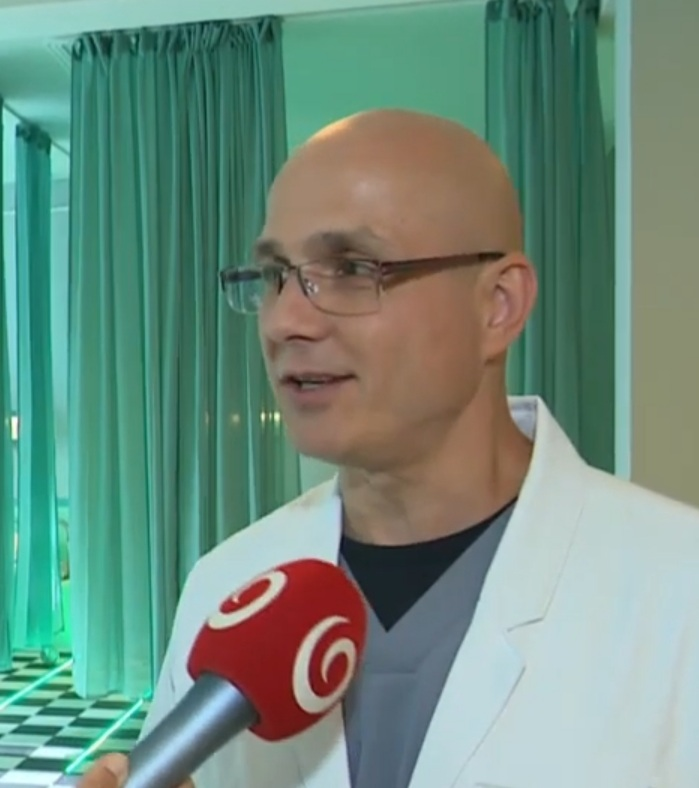
- Dušan Cinkota in 2020
- Born: October 13, 1970 (age 55); Banská Bystrica, Czechoslovakia
- Other name: Cinky
- Education: Academy of Performing Arts in Bratislava
- Occupations: Actor, voice actor
- Years active: 1990—present
- Spouse: Zuzana Cinkotová
- Children: Oleg (* 2018)
- Parent(s): Zdenka Cinkotová, Dušan Cinkota

Dušan Cinkota (born 13 October 1970) is a Slovak theatre and film actor.

After graduating the acting studies at the Academy of Performing Arts in Bratislava (1988—1992) he acted in Radošina Naive Theatre (1991—1994). Since 1994 he was a member of the Drama of the Slovak National Theatre. Directors cast him in both comedic and dramatic roles. In 1995, he won the Litfond Award for the best male actor of the year in the play Allergy. Thanks to his movement and singing dispositions, he was entrusted as a guest with several title characters in musicals at New Scene in Bratislava – Blood Brothers, Gypsies Are Found Near Heaven, Cyrano from the Suburb and Hamlet.

He has created many dubbing characters and in 2000 received the Litfond Award for the best dubbing of Tom Hanks. In 2003—2005 he was a member of the Jozef Gregor Tajovský Theater in Zvolen. In 2006, he presented the reality show Vyvolení 2 on TV JOJ.

== Voice acting ==
Dušan Cinkota has a very soft, characteristic voice, thanks to which he often dubbed. His most famous roles include Chandler Bing (Matthew Perry) from the series Friends. He also dubbed the robot Sonny in the movie I, Robot. He often dubs Adam Sandler and Tom Hanks, whom he dubbed in more than 15 films.

== Drugs possession charge ==
In 2001, he was sentenced for drug possession to two years without parole; he served thirteen months. At the end of May 2007, he was arrested again for drug crimes. Since he had already been punished for the same act, he was threatened with ten to fifteen years in prison.

In March 2012, the first-instance Bratislava IV District Court unconditionally sentenced him to eight years of imprisonment, but Cinkota appealed against the sentence. On 5 December 2012, the Regional Court in Bratislava rejected the appeal and confirmed the judgment of the 1st instance court as administrative and legal.

On 11 July 2018 was released from prison on parole. He served three-quarters of his sentence and, according to the court, showed improvement while in jail. At the same time, the court set a probationary period of 30 months, during which it will monitor whether the parolee leads a normal life.

== Filmography ==
- 1990: Sila lásky (TV film)
- 1990: Tichá bolesť
- 1990: Ujo maliar pozýva (TV seriál)
- 1991: Štúrovci (TV seriál)
- 1992: Klinec (TV film)
- 1992: Veľkonočný sen
- 1993: Výlety v pamäti (TV film)
- 1994: Dlhý, Široký, Bystrozraký (TV film)
- 1995: ...kone na betóne
- 1996: 100 percentne čistá láska (TV film)
- 1998: Za mestskými múrmi (TV seriál)
- 1998: Dožinky (TV film)
- 2000: Čarovala ryba, aby bola chyba (TV film)
- 2001: Hana a jej bratia
- 2001: Vadí, nevadí
- 2001: Kováč Juraj (TV film)
- 2004: Zlatý hlas (TV film)
- 2005: Rodinné tajomstvá (TV series)
- 2007: Ordinácia v ružovej záhrade (TV series)
- 2008: The Professionals (TV series)
- 2008: V poli
- 2009: Odsúdené (TV series)
- 2009: Rádio (TV series)
- 2010: Aféry (TV series)
- 2011: Zita na krku (TV series)
- 2011: Lóve
- 2011: Druhý dych (TV seriál)
- 2011: Delta (študentský film)
- 2012: Spiknutie
- 2020, 2021–present: Červené pásky
- 2021: Slovania (TV series)
- 2021: Delukse (TV series)
- 2022 – present: Šťastní vs Šťastní (TV series)
- 2022: Ultimátum (TV series)
