= Eva Pavlíková =

Slovak actress

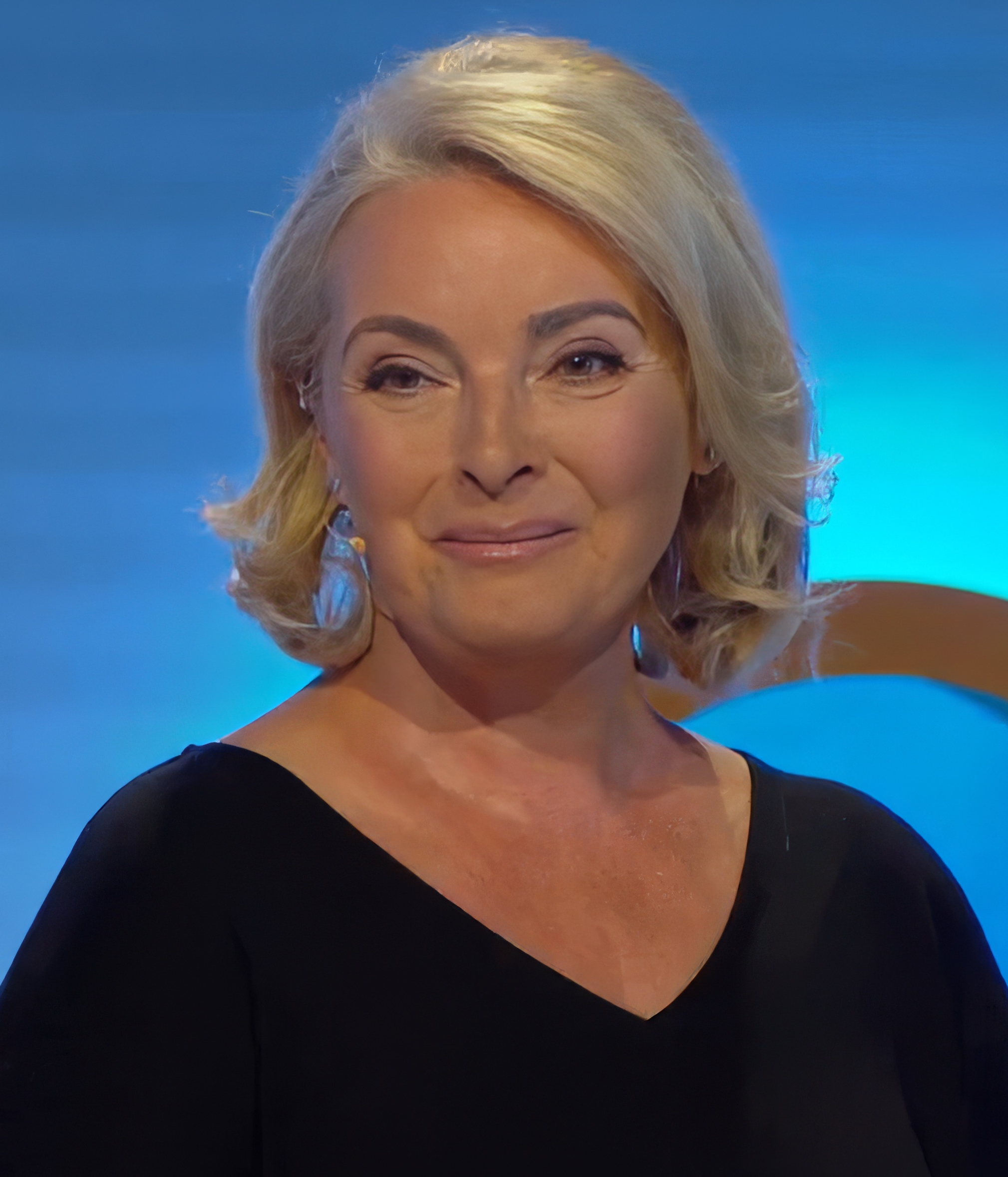
- Eva Pavlíková in 2020
- Born: 17 September 1960 (age 66); Košice, Czechoslovakia
- Occupation: Actress
- Years active: 1981–present

Eva Pavlíková (born 17 September 1960) is a Slovak actress. At the 2004 Crystal Wing Awards she won in the theatre category, for her work at the Andrej Bagar Theatre in Nitra. She has a daughter, Katarína Kubošiová, who is a singer known as Katarzia.

== Selected filmography ==
- Šiesta veta (1986)
- Tábor padlých žien (1997)
- Ordinácia v ružovej záhrade (television, 2007)
- Normálna rodinka (television, 2008)
- Druhý dych (television, 2011)
- Búrlivé víno (television, 2012)
