= Karin Haydu =

Slovak actress (born 1977)

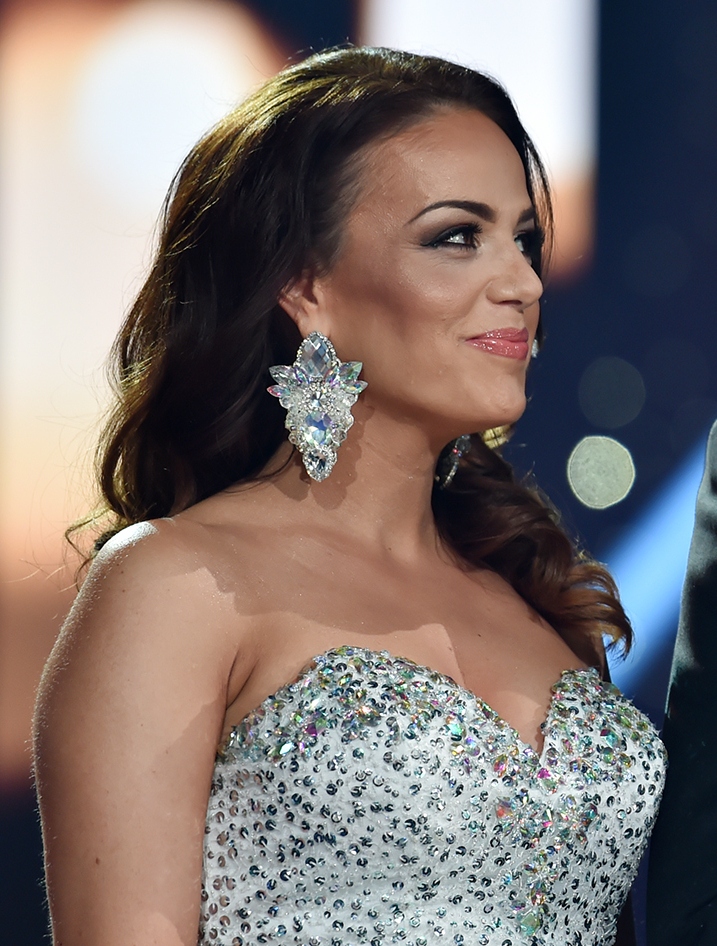
- Karin Haydu in 2017
- Born: 7 April 1977 (age 49); Bratislava, Czechoslovakia
- Education: Academy of Performing Arts in Bratislava
- Occupation: Actress
- Spouse: Peter Antovský (m. 2005; div. 2008)
- Children: 1

Karin Haydu (born 7 April 1977) is a Slovak actress.

== Biography ==
Karin Haydu was born on 7 April 1977 in Bratislava. Since her early childhood, she dreamed of becoming an actress. As a 13 years old she starred in the Juraj Jakubisko movie It's Better to Be Wealthy and Healthy Than Poor and Ill. She studied acting at the Academy of Performing Arts in Bratislava and appeared in plays in the Slovak National Theatre as well as other Bratislava-based theaters, including La Komika and West.

In the 2000s, Haydu starred in popular TV shows, including Ordinácia v ružovej záhrade, Panelák, Hod Svišťom and Búrlivé Víno. She also appeared as a contestant in the 2011 edition of the show Let's Dance, where she was eliminated in the first round and the 2019 edition of the show Tvoja tvár znie povedome.

== Personal life ==
From 2005 to 2008, Karin Haydu was married to Peter Antovský. They had one daughter.
