= Poruba, Prievidza District =

Poruba
- Municipality
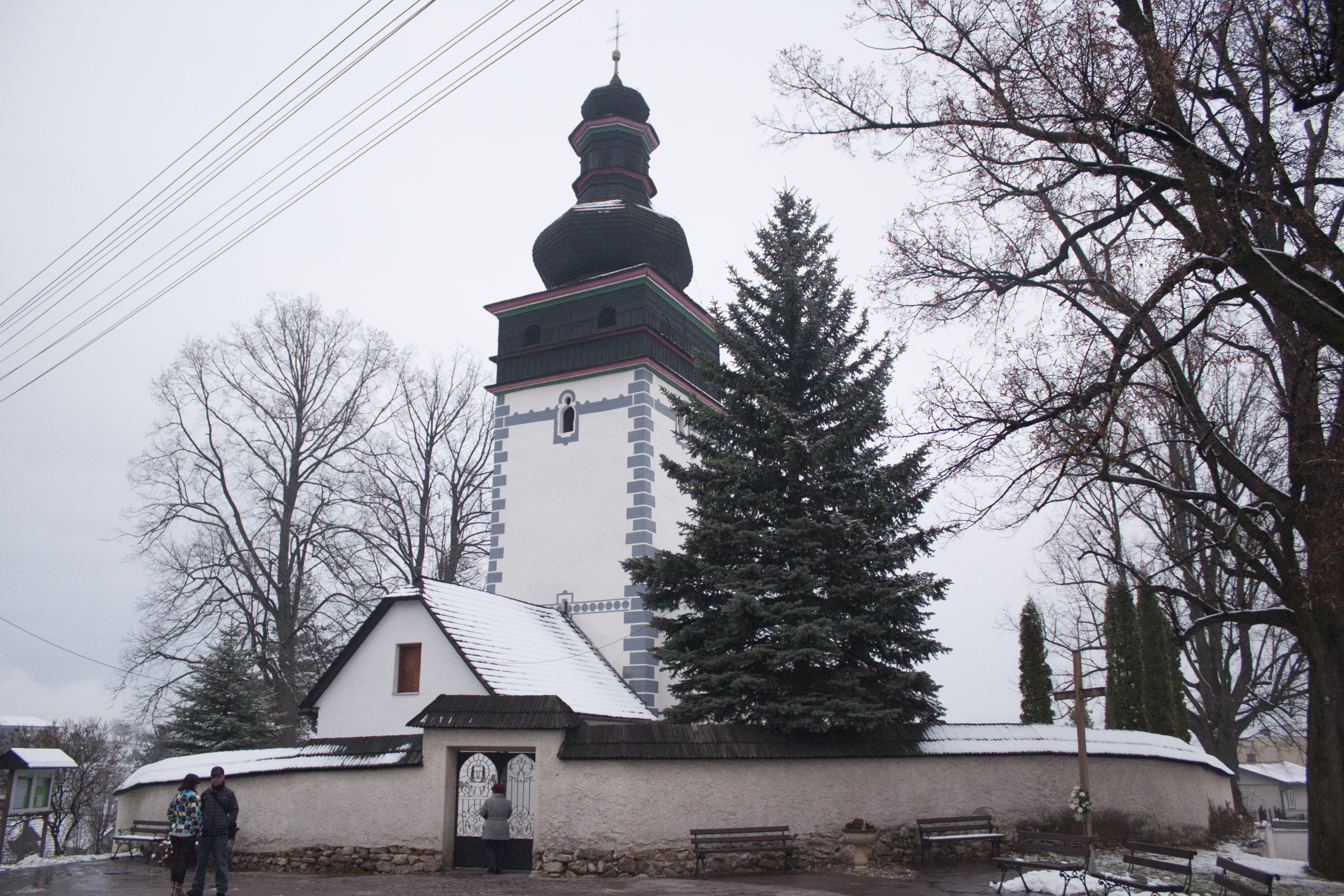

- Flag

- Location of Poruba in the Trenčín Region Location of Poruba in Slovakia
- Coordinates: 48°49′N 18°35′E
- Country: Slovakia
- Region: Trenčín Region
- District: Prievidza District
- First mentioned: 1339

Area
  - Total: 15.14 km^{2} (5.85 sq mi)
- Elevation: 410 m (1,350 ft)

Population (2025)
  - Total: 1,342
- Time zone: UTC+1 (CET)
  - Summer (DST): UTC+2 (CEST)
- Postal code: 972 11
- Area code: +421 46
- Vehicle registration plate (until 2022): PD
- Website: www.poruba.sk

Poruba (Hungarian: Mohos) is a village in central Slovakia.

== History ==
In historical records the village was first mentioned in 1339.

== Geography ==
The municipality lies at an altitude of 410 metres (1,350 ft) and covers an area of 15.14 km^{2} (5.85 sq mi) (2025). Poruba belongs to the Prievidza District of the Trenčín Region.

== Population ==
Population statistic (10 years)
Year	1995	2005	2015	2025
Count	1262	1299	1299	1342
Difference		+2.93%	+0%	+3.31%

Population statistic
Year	2024	2025
Count	1372	1342
Difference		−2.18%

It has a population of 1342 people (31 December 2025).

=== Ethnicity ===
Census 2021 (1+ %)
Ethnicity	Number	Fraction
Slovak	1344	97.67%
Not found out	28	2.03%
Total	1376	

In year 2021 was 1376 people by ethnicity 1344 as Slovak, 28 as Not found out, 8 as Czech, 5 as German, 5 as Hungarian, 5 as Other, 2 as Rusyn, 1 as Ukrainian, 1 as Italian, 1 as Romani and 1 as Moravian.

Note on population: The difference values of population numbers in the table "Population statistic" and in the sections "Ethnicity" & "Religion" is caused by the use of various statistical methods.

=== Religion ===
Census 2021 (1+ %)
Religion	Number	Fraction
Roman Catholic Church	904	65.7%
None	402	29.22%
Not found out	32	2.33%
Total	1376	

In year 2021 was 1376 people by religion 904 from Roman Catholic Church, 402 from None, 32 from Not found out, 10 from Christian Congregations in Slovakia, 10 from Evangelical Church, 4 from Ad hoc movements, 3 from Other, 3 from Greek Catholic Church, 2 from Calvinist Church, 2 from Jehovah's Witnesses, 1 from Eastern Orthodox Church, 1 from New Apostolic Church, 1 from United Methodist Church and 1 from Buddhism.
