= Barbara Haščáková =

Slovak singer of pop music (1979–2023)

Background information
- Born: Barbara Haščáková; 11 December 1979; Košice, Czechoslovakia
- Origin: Slovakia
- Died: 22 November 2023 (aged 43) Sarasota, Florida, U.S.
- Genres: Eurodance, Pop
- Occupation: Singer
- Years active: 1994–2006
- Labels: PolyGram; Universal
- Website: barbarahascakova.com

Barbara Haščáková (11 December 1979 – 22 November 2023) was a Slovak singer of pop music. She won the Best Female Singer prize at the Slávik Awards in 1998.

== Early life ==
Barbara Haščáková was born on 11 December 1979 in Košice. Her father was the illustrator Jozef Haščák.

== Music career ==
Haščáková started her career as a 14-year-old in the band Maduar after the manager of the group Ladislav Matyinko convinced her parents that Maduar would be a successful band and they consented to her becoming a member. Nonetheless, she did not remain a Maduar member for long. After the very successful first album of Maduar—I Feel Good with platinum record status and Song of the Year and Album of the Year prizes—she continued as a part of the duo act MC Erik & Barbara with fellow former Maduar member Erik Aresta.

In the late 1990s, Haščáková reached the height of her popularity. Following her 1998 win at the Slávik Awards, she received nominations also for 1999 and 2000 when the award went to Jana Kirschner. Nonetheless, in 1999 she moved to the United States in order to escape from the pressures of fame. In the US she got married and lived first in the state of Wyoming and later in Florida.

In spite of recording several albums in Slovak and in English, she failed to reach any further commercial success. Her only notable production after emigration is the 2016 duet Nepozerám with Miroslav Jaroš.

== Death ==
Haščáková died from a stroke in Sarasota, Florida, on 22 November 2023, at the age of 43. Following a funeral in Sarasota her body was transported to Slovakia for burial in her native town of Košice.

== Discography ==
=== Studio albums ===
- 1997: Barbara
- 1999: Ver, Že Ja
- 2003: Secrets of Happiness
- 2006: Me & My Music

== Awards and nominations ==
Year	Nominated work	Award	Category	Result	Ref
1998	Herself	Slávik Awards	Best Female Singer	Winner	
1999	Herself	Slávik Awards	Best Female Singer	Nominated	
2000	Herself	Slávik Awards	Best Female Singer	Nominated	
