= Mária Čírová =

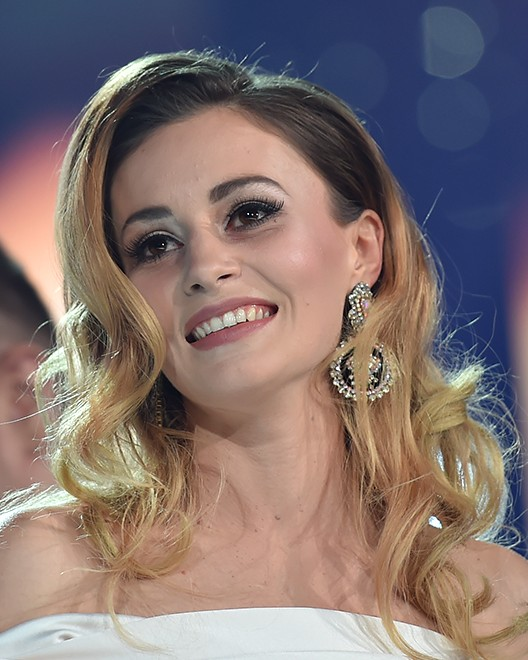
- Čírová in January 2017

Background information
- Born: Mária Čírová; 20 November 1988 (age 37); Trnava, Czechoslovakia
- Origin: Dolné Lovčice, Slovakia
- Genres: Pop
- Occupation: Singer-songwriter
- Instrument: Vocals
- Years active: 2006–present
- Labels: Street Production, Universal Music
- Website: mariacirova.sk

Mária Čírová (born 20 November 1988) is Slovak singer. In 2008, she won the final, eight edition of the Coca-Cola Popstar contest in Slovakia.

== Discography ==
=== Albums ===
Year	Album
2006	Na tisícich miestach with Trinity Group: Label: Trinity Group; Format: CD
2008	Búrka: Label: Street Production; Format: CD
2011	Na dosah: Label: Universal; Format:CD

=== Singles ===
Year	Song	Charts		Album
Year	Song	SK		Album
Year	Song	50	100	Album
Airplay singles
2008	"Búrka"	2	5	Búrka
2009	"Zbierka hriechov"	4	17	Búrka
2009	"Ľadová doba"	13	38	Búrka
2010	"Bez obáv"	7	46	Na dosah
2011	"Labutia"	1	7	Na dosah
2011	"Na dosah"	7	58	Na dosah
2012	"My"	4	41	Na dosah
2013	"Chýbaš"	23	—	non-album song
2014	"Vloupám se" with O5 & Radeček	—	—	non-album song
"—" denotes a single that did not chart or was not released in that region.

== Filmography ==
Year	Title	Role	Notes
Television
2010	L.O.V.E.	co-host	lifestyle magazine by TV Doma

== Awards ==
=== Major awards ===
Year	Nominated work	Award	Category	Result
2006	Na tisícich miestach with Trinity Group	Aurel Awards	Best Gospel Album	Won

=== Music polls ===
Slávik by FORZA, Slovakia

Year	Nomination	Category	Result
2008	Herself	People's Choice – Female Singer	39
2009	Herself	People's Choice – Female Singer	8^{[A]}
2010	Herself	People's Choice – Female Singer	10
2011	Herself	People's Choice – Female Singer	7
2012	Herself	People's Choice – Female Singer	7

Notes

- A In 2009, Čírová won a subcategory of the poll as the Jumper of the Year.
