= Horkýže Slíže =

Slovak rock band

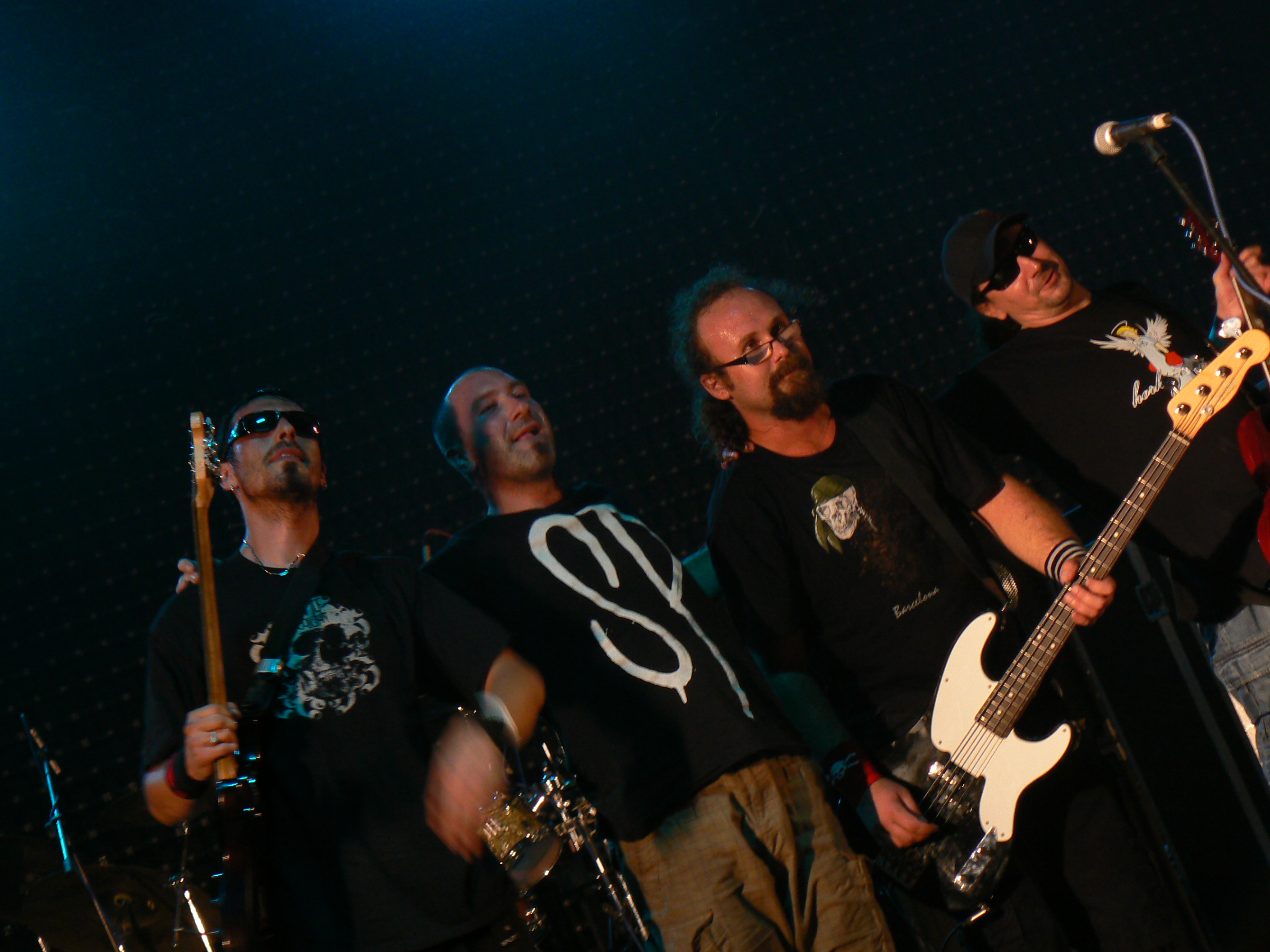

Background information
- Origin: Nitra, Slovakia
- Genres: Rock, punk rock, comedy rock, grunge
- Years active: 1992–present
- Labels: HS Records, EMI, BMG
- Members: Peter Hrivňák (Kuko); Mário Sabo (Sabotér); Juraj Štefánik (Štefko, Doktor); Marek Viršík (Vandel); Veronika Smetanová
- Past members: Martin Košovan (Košo); Martin Žiak (Apíčko); Noro Ivančík
- Website: www.horkyzeslize.sk

Horkýže Slíže is a Slovak rock band formed on the 4th November 1992, in Nitra. At the beginning of their career, they mainly played hard rock, later comedy rock, which is also referred to as naive punk. Today, the band focuses exclusively on punk rock. Their lyrics are known for their humorous content and they sometimes produce parodies of other styles of music, such as 'R'n'B Soul', which is a clear take-off of contemporary R&B styles. Their other hits include "Maštaľ", "Vlak", "A Ja Sprostá", among others. Horkýže Slíže has received two platinum albums (Kýže Sliz and Ukáž Tú Tvoju Zoo).

The band was founded in late 1992 by Peter Hrivňák, Mário Sabo, and Martin Košovan. In September 1993, they recruited bassist Martin Žiak.

== Members ==
=== Current members ===
- Peter Hrivňák (Kuko) - bass guitar (1992–2018), vocals (1992–present)
- Mário Sabo (Sabotér, Maj Faking Sistr) - guitar, backing vocals (1992–present)
- Juraj Štefánik (Štefko, Doktor) - guitar, backing vocals (1995–present)
- Marek Viršík (Vandel) - drums, backing vocals (2002–present)
- Veronika Smetanová - bass guitar (2018–present)

=== Former members ===
- Martin Košovan (Košo) - drums, backing vocals (1992–2002)
- Martin Žiak - bass guitar
- Noro Ivančík - bass guitar

== History ==
=== The Beginning ===
The band was founded at the end of 1992 by Peter Hrivňák, Mário Sabo, and Martin Košovan. In September 1993, they brought in bassist Martin Žiak. At the start of winter 1993, Žiak left the group, and Kuko picked up the bass again, continuing in the original lineup.

At the beginning of 1994 and again in May, they recorded two demo tapes at the studio of Tomáš Kmeť in Hlohovec, which they then "copied" and distributed to fans. By the end of 1994, the band independently recorded and released their first unofficial studio album, "Prvý slíž", with a total of 600 cassette copies. In the meantime, they performed in cities beyond Nitra, including Prievidza and Nové Zámky. In summer 1994, they also added a new bassist, Noro Ivančík.

In February 1995, Horkýže Slíže brought in a second guitarist, Juro Štefánik, who played his first concert with the band in March. Around this time, radio host Julo Viršík was driving through Nitra when he heard their song "Maštaľ" on a local station. Impressed, he invited the band to perform at the Letné srdce festival in Levice and got them into the VTV television competition "Ebony uvádza" by recommending them to Martin Karvaš, the owner of Studio Ebony. There, they recorded the song "Stretol veselý"… By the end of 1996, the band decided to approach a major label, BMG Ariola. In June 1997, they signed a contract for three albums.

=== V rámci oného, Vo štvorici po opici, and Ja chaču tebja ===
Immediately after signing the deal, the band entered the studio to record their debut album. Titled "V rámci oného", it was released in October 1997, featuring the standout single "Maštaľ".

In November 1998, they released the album "Vo štvorici po opici", with the single "Gilotína", which also had a music video.

A new album was planned for 1999, but Mário was conscripted into military service in Sereď. After his return, the band went back to the studio to record new material. The resulting album, "Ja chaču tebja", was released on May 1, 2000, along with a music video for the title track. Toward the end of the album, there’s the song "Logická hádanka", which they have performed at every concert since the album’s release.

All three albums include songs from the demo "Prvý slíž" along with new material. The band was playing shows in cities like Nitra, Prievidza, and Zlaté Moravce. In 2001, BMG Ariola released a best-of album from the first three records, titled Best uff.

=== Festival Chorobná ===
After many concerts, the band switched labels to EMI Records and returned to the studio to record new material. This resulted in the album Festival Chorobná, which represents a fictional festival featuring bands with humorous names like Spitipárter, Protektív Kaučuk, Báro Sáro, Zelený Ronald Reagge, Maxim turbo perverse 4, Gulevátor, and Štrbavý mamut—all actually performed by Horkýže Slíže. It was their first album to gain widespread popularity, thanks to songs like "Kožky-perie", "Lístok na Mars", and "Veľká Mača Vincov Háj", which were played on rock radio stations. It was also the last album to feature original drummer Martin Košovan, who left the band by choice in May 2002. His replacement was Marek Viršík.

=== Kýže sliz (The Golden Era) ===
Following the success of the previous album, the band decided to take a more hit-oriented approach and aimed to break into foreign markets. In September 2002, with their new drummer, they went into the studio to record the album "Kýže sliz", released in October. It contains now-iconic Slovak tracks such as "Malá Žužu", "Vlak", "Brďokoky", "L.A.G. song", "Traja spití roboši", and "Cigarety". The band toured extensively across Czechoslovakia, and all shows were sold out. The album eventually achieved platinum status, selling over 30,000 copies.

=== Alibaba a 40 krátkych songov ===
The entire year of 2003 was filled with concerts, and the band surprised fans with a new album recorded in just 5 days. This was a collection of short tracks titled "Alibaba a 40 krátkych songov". It significantly boosted the band's popularity, especially in the Czech Republic, where they organized a tour across Moravia. They continued touring with the band Divokej Bill through mid-2004.

=== Ritero Xaperle Bax and Živák ===
In late summer, the band went back into the studio to record a new album titled "Ritero Xaperle Bax", released in October 2004. It includes the nationwide hit "Šanghaj Cola", which also became the name of the accompanying tour. Horkýže Slíže then decided to record a live concert for CD and DVD, which was recorded at the start of 2005 and released later that year. In 2005, they also performed outside of Slovakia and the Czech Republic—in Poland, Ukraine, and even the U.S. (Chicago). The years 2005 and 2006 were marked by festival and club performances.

=== Ukáž tú tvoju zoo ===
In January 2007, the band entered the studio once again to record new material. The new album, "Ukáž tú tvoju zoo", was released in February and kicked off a nearly two-year-long tour across Slovakia and the Czech Republic. The album reached number one on the Slovak album chart and eventually went platinum.

=== Present Times ===
In October 2009, the album "54 dole hlavou was" released. In 2011, they released a best-of compilation titled V dobrej viere, covering their greatest hits from 2001 to 2011. In November 2012, the album "St. Mary Huana Ganja" was released, featuring the hit single "Mám v piči na lehátku". In late summer 2017, the long-awaited 11th album "Pustite Karola" came out.

During the COVID-19 pandemic in 2020 and 2021, the band recorded a new album, released in September 2021 as "Alibaba a 40 krátkych songov 2". With this album, they reached out more to the younger generation by blending various genres with punk rock—for example, the single "Rampa", featuring the rap trio DMS.

On August 28th Horkýže Slíže released a new album titled ...A čarovné slovíčko? (...And a magic word?) consisting of 16 songs including intro, outro and a CD bonus Zakopané. The songs from this album will have debuted on Slížovica festival in Slovakia.

Horkýže Slíže remain widely popular in both Slovakia and the Czech Republic. They continue to perform regularly at festivals, student events, and club shows.

== Discography ==
=== Studio albums ===
Title	Released	Awards	Sales	Highest Chart Position Recorded
V Rámci Oného	October 1997			
Vo Štvorici Po Opici	September 1998			
Ja Chaču Tebja	March 2000			
Festival Chorobná	October 2001			
Kýže Slíž	October 2002	SK: Platinum	SK: 30 000+	
Alibaba A 40 Krátkych Songov	November 2003			CZ: 57
Ritero Xaperle Bax	October 2004			CZ: 33
Ukáž Tú Tvoju Zoo	February 2007	SK: Platinum	SK: 6000+	SK: 1 CZ: 12
54 Dole Hlavou	October 2009			CZ: 10
St. Mary Huana Ganja	November 2012			CZ: 32
Pustite Karola	September 2017			CZ: 29
Alibaba A 40 Krátkych Songov 2	September 2021			
...A čarovné slovíčko?	August 2026			

=== Compilations ===
- Best Uff (2001)
- V Dobrej Viere 2001-2011 (2011)
- Platinum Collection (2013)

=== Live albums ===
- Živák (CD/DVD) (2005)

=== Box Set ===
- Festival Chorobná/Kýže Sliz (2006)
- Box Úplne Prvých 4 Nahrávok (2018)
- Box/Zatiaľ/Úplne Všetkých Nahrávok (2023)

=== Demo ===
- "Prvý Slíž' (CS 1994), (CD reissue 2018)
