= Spadla z oblakov =

1978 TV series by Radim Cvrček

- Also known as: She Fell from clouds (english title)
- Slovak: Spadla z oblakov
- Genre: Children's, science-fiction
- Written by: Václav Pavel Borovička; František Vlček
- Directed by: Radim Cvrček
- Starring: Zuzana Pravňanská
- Composer: Harry Macourek
- Country of origin: Czechoslovakia
- Original language: Slovak
- No. of episodes: 13

Production
- Producer: Czechoslovak Television
- Cinematography: Karel Kopecký

Original release
- Release: October 25, 1978

Spadla z oblakov (Slovak, in English translated as She Fell from the clouds) is a Slovak language sci-fi TV series for children created in 1978. The series became very popular in Czechoslovakia and several other countries.

The series was based on 1967 child book Spadla z nebe (She came out of the blue sky) by Václav Pavel Borovička, a Czech writer and screenwriter. The first, very successful edition was followed by several reprints, the last in year 2000 (ISBN 80-7214-365-4). The TV series follows the book quite closely, except for the ending, which is changed from sad to relatively happy (instead of dying, the protagonist goes back where she came from).

== The plot ==
An extraterrestrial alien lands on Earth near the (fictional) Slovak town Čabovce. The alien, which looks like a little girl, meets with a group of children from the town who name her Maika (Slovak spelling: Majka). They instantly know she is no normal person, since she repeatedly demonstrates her ability to levitate and even walk on water.

At first, her appearance and mannerisms invoke the uncanny valley; her skin appears wax-like and her speech is staccato. She is able to speak correct, if stilted, Slovak after plugging in the correct language module in the utility belt she is always wearing (at first she tried to address the children in German).

Maika seems completely humorless and unfeeling, questioning even such simple expressions as what it means to "like" something. She says she came to Earth from the remote planet Gurun by means of the "system" Felix. (The day she appeared, a strange aurora-like glow was seen over the nearby woods, and a peculiar mechanical voice speaking the word "Felix" intruded in local broadcasts. Just what Felix is, beyond its being Maika's means of transportation and possessing an intelligence of its own, is left unclear throughout. It may not be exactly what humans would understand as a "ship", though it is mentioned in the series that the day Maika appeared, Palomar Observatory noticed a small object moving with immense speed in Earth's vicinity.)

Maika demonstrates extensive knowledge of encyclopedical facts about the human world, which she says have been derived from earthly radio broadcasts picked up by the Gurunians. At the same time, it becomes evident that the aliens have poor insight into human nature and even human anatomy. When the children try to hold a "banquet" in Maika's honor, she eats nothing, as she gets her energy from a gem-like "stabilizer" in her belt. Instead her eyes start to glow and twinkle as she transmits her view of the eating kids to Gurun, and the report curiously also intrudes on all TV sets in the area, complete with the narration of "Felix": The alien voice informs the Gurunians that the bodies of earthlings end in an upward projection called a "head", and that this "head" has several orifices, through one of which the earthlings absorb fuel. The fuel is however of extremely poor quality, requiring them to constantly refuel in ever-repeated rituals called "breakfast", "lunch" and "dinner".

It is thus implied that though Maika herself has human features including a head and a mouth, such anatomical features are in fact alien to the Gurunians, and Maika's current human-like body would be a mere imitation to facilitate contact with humans.

Over the course of the series, Maika however develops a deeper understanding of people's emotions and behaviour, slowly getting acquainted with them through the help of her new friends, and in time she seems to experience genuine emotions herself. Her appearance also gets more human, her skin and hair becoming less wax-like (again indicating that her body is really an imitation, which she can fine-tune and improve as she gets to observe humans up close). Among her friends, she eventually stops talking in the staccato, robot-like voice she used at first, beginning to sound more like a normal human child. She also seems to develop an appreciation for the human concept of "fun", and uses her abilities to fly or to effortlessly replicate things as a source of entertainment and adventures for her friends.

Eventually the kids are no longer able to keep Maika hidden from the adults, nor does she herself try to be particularly discreet. After various demonstrations of her abilities, the local community accepts that she is indeed an alien, and she even participates in a press conference.

After promiscuous use of the matter replicator during the press conference, Maika suddenly appears weak and indicates that the "stabilizer" in her belt needs to be replaced. Karol, the boy she has connected most closely with, helps her get to a glade in the woods where a stretch of scorched earth indicates the place Felix originally came down. Warned by Maika, Karol hides behind a rock as a blinding, pulsating light descends, and a new "stabilizer" lands in Maika's hand. Seconds later, Felix is gone, but Maika happily dances as she once again has all the energy she needs.

While the publicity curiously does not seem to cause an instant world sensation, an unidentified foreign nation takes an interest in Maika, and their agents eventually attempt a kidnapping. Maika herself is rather cooperative, regarding the kidnapping as an opportunity for her to learn more about earth culture. However, once the kidnappers have her in their helicopter and try to take her out of the country, she uses her abilities to reverse the helicopter mid-air. The foreign agents are arrested by the authorities. (The Slovak authorities themselves appear altogether benign and are seemingly happy to leave Maika alone with her young friends, even after her demonstration of potentially world-changing alien technology during the press conference.)

Using her abilities to levitate objects and even people, Maika takes her friends on adventures as far as Bratislava and even Prague, but it seems that this again depletes the "stabilizer" she derives her energy from. At the end of the penultimate episode, Maika is once again weak, and worst of all, she is now even unable to communicate with the "system Felix" so that she can get a replacement stabilizer.

The last episode is a race against time as Karol once more tries to bring Maika (seemingly dying) to the glade in the woods, but this time with no guarantee that Felix will even be there. Luckily one of the kids is a radio amateur that has earlier picked up the strange voice of the alien "system", and he finally manages to make contact and inform Felix of the plight of their ambassador. The intense, pulsating light once again descends on the woods, and Karol understands that this is goodbye. In his last moments with Maika, he declares his love for her. Maika herself sheds her first-ever tear, and promises Karol that she will return to him and "the gang".

With her departure, the series closes, though the kids are hopeful that in time, they will see their strange friend again.

The relatively happy ending of the TV series departs from the original book, which ended on a sad note as instead of going home, Maika dies.

== Details ==
The series was produced in 1978 by Czechoslovak Television Bratislava in Film Ateliers Gottwaldov. It consists of 13 parts, each lasting about 25 minutes. Radim Cvrček served as the director, the main child role (Maika) was played by Zuzana Pravňanská. The music was composed by Harry Macourek.

The format of the series vaguely gives the impression that it is a reconstruction of real events. The very first episode starts out in a rather didactic fashion: A seemingly learned man, who is later shown to be a doctor, directly addresses the camera and talks about the world-shaking events that have recently taken place; he adds a sense of realism by exactly pinpointing the location we are about to see as 49° 5′ 20″ N, 19° 25′ 22″ E. These geographical coordinates are repeated in many of the introductions to the following episodes, adding a flair of scientific exactitude. (In reality, the coordinates simply point to the wood-covered outskirts of a large field, hardly resembling the location seen in the series.)

After Maika's departure, the series ends with two characters suddenly breaking the fourth wall and directly addressing the viewers. In light of Maika's promise that she will return, they tell viewers that if they ever come to the Tatra Mountains and see a flying girl, that would be her.

Spadla z oblakov does contain a number of special effects, some of which have aged worse than others, but all would be good to excellent when considered by the standards of a 1978 TV production. Maika regularly flies, shows glowing eyes when she transmits what she sees to her home planet, and sometimes uses her automatic replicator which can copy material objects exactly (apparently down to molecular level). However, the series does not primarily rely on astonishing visual effects and keeps the storyline focused on understanding the human world from the point of view of a (non-human) child. At the same time, the human children try to figure out the visitor, whose mannerisms evolve from uncannily detached to almost perfectly human-like by the end of the series.

== Cast ==
- Zuzana Pravňanská as Majka
- Matej Landl as Karol
- Lubor Cajka as Slávo
- Svetlana Majbová as Katka
- Karol Polák as Dedič
- Michal Suchánek (Czech actor) as Jurko
- Pavel Lazar as Ferko
- Roman Kudrna as Igor
- Mária Hájková as grandmother
- Václav Babka as doctor
- Ján Kramár as VB Kvasnák
- Milan Kis as Slávo's father, hotel doorman
- František Zvarík as Valko, hotel manager
- Peter Scholtz as Emil Horák
- Emil Horváth Sr. as teacher
- Jozef Bednárik as Palo

== Parallels with E.T. ==
The 1978 series has numerous parallels with the popular 1982 movie E.T. the Extra-Terrestrial. In both stories, a diminutive alien appears on Earth, but is initially only known to a group of children. In both, the alien is able to levitate things and flies with its newfound friends. In both, the kids initially try to hide the alien from the adults, but its existence is eventually revealed. In both, the alien eventually falls ill and desperately needs to contact its own people for them to pick it up. In both, radio contact is finally established by improvised means. In both, the story ends with a sad goodbye between the alien and the boy it has connected most closely with.

== Name in other languages ==
The series has been aired in several foreign countries (first in 1981 in Norway) under different names.

- English: She Came Out of the Blue Sky
- Russian: Приключения в каникулы
- German: Sie kam aus dem All
- Polish: Majka z Kosmosu/Spadła z obłoków
- Cambodian: ម៉ៃកា កុមារីធ្លាក់ពីលើមេឃ
- Norwegian, the nynorsk form: Majka – jenta frå verdsrommet (Majka – the girl from space)
- Vietnamese: Maika - Cô bé từ trên trời rơi xuống
- Hungarian: Csillagok küldötte
- Bulgarian: Паднала от облаците
- Spanish: Mayka, La Niña del Espacio
- Mongolian: "Оддын охин"

== Remake ==
Maika - The Girl From Another Planet is a Vietnameseized version of the movie directed by Hàm Trần. The film, produced by BHD in 2022, is the first science fiction work for children in Vietnam.

The story of Maika (Chu Diệp Anh) revolves around the character Hung (Lại Trường Phú), a boy who is suffering from loneliness after losing his mother and his best friend, who has to suddenly move to another place. A miracle happens when Hung suddenly discovers a crashed spaceship and meets the alien girl Maika. Not only has she a pretty appearance, Maika also has magical superpowers, while being somewhat innocent regarding the customs of the Earth. Together, the duo embarks on an exciting adventure filled with joys of friendship, family, and compassion. The kids also use creative tactics to confront the bad guys who want to kidnap Maika.
