= Oteckovia =

Slovak family comedy-drama television series

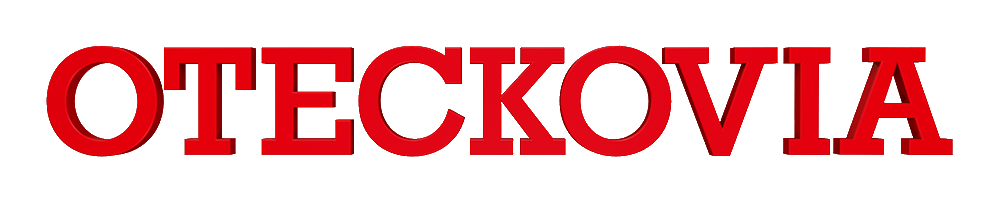
- Genre: Family; Comedy drama; Romance
- Based on: Señores Papis
- Screenplay by: Katarína Mikulíková; Hana Lasicová
- Story by: Marcela Guerty; Pamela Rementería; Cecilia Guerty; Pablo Junovich
- Directed by: Vladimir Fischer; Adriana Totikova; Peter Minarcin
- Starring: Filip Tůma; Vladimír Kobielsky; Branislav Deák; Marek Fašiang; Zuzana Mauréry; Monika Hilmerová; Oliver Oswald; Karina Qayumová; Zuzana Kraváriková; Mária Bartalos; Natália Puklušová; Zuzana Porubjaková; Jana Kovalčiková; Marián Mitaš; Maroš Baňas; Laura Gavaldová; Izabela Gavorníková; Jakub Horák; Dominika Kavaschová; Tobias Král; Patrik Kučera; Eva Pavlíková; Gabriela Dzuríková
- Opening theme: "Dievčatá" by Hex
- Composers: Peter Dudák; Martin Žúži
- Country of origin: Slovakia
- Original language: Slovak
- No. of seasons: 5
- No. of episodes: 772 (list of episodes)

Production
- Executive producer: Natália Bobocká
- Producers: Michal Krajčík; Helena Mindeková; Nikol Šmátralová; Ivica Dubovska; Alexandra Dubovská; Ján Diepers
- Cinematography: Michal Adamec; Pavol Mariposa; Slavomir Maxian; Milan Minarik; Michal Schnierer; Viliam Tutko; Peter Zalube
- Running time: 45 minutes

Original release
- Network: Televísa Markíza
- Release: January 1, 2018 – June 10, 2022

Oteckovia (English: Dads) is a Slovak family comedy-drama television series based on the 2014 Argentine soap opera Señores Papis. The series is directed by Vladmir Fishcer, Adriana Totikova and Peter Minarcin, and produced by Michal Krajčík, Helena Mindeková, Nikol Šmátralová, Ivica Dubovska, Alexandra Dubovská and Ján Diepers. The main cast is Filip Tůma, Vladimír Kobielsky, Branislav Deák, Marek Fašiang, Zuzana Mauréry, Monika Hilmerová, Oliver Oswald, Mária Bartalos, Izabela Gavorníková, Zuzana Kravariková, and others. The plot concerns four fathers struggling to manage their family, children and estranged wives. The fathers must keep up with what is typically women's work and household activities. Minor roles consist of a pair of teenagers, platonic friends Luky and Nina—opposite their love interests Dominik and Dorka. The two pairs meet with romantic obstacles and distrust. Oteckovia has gained 508,000 Slovak viewers; among them, 313,000 are young viewers with a market share of 41.7%. The series has aired since January 1, 2018 on TV Markíza.

== Synopsis ==
Four fathers—Marek, Vladimir, Tomáš and Alexander—work different jobs and end up leaving their estranged wives, leaving them to raise their children collectively. They must keep up with the duties of maintaining a household. The fathers face relationship difficulties with their wives, children, or both. Luky and childhood friend Nina experience romantic attraction to their classmates, Dorta and Dominik respectively. The pair meet with frustration, including spending romantic periods due to infidelity. The two boys and girls face interpersonal conflict while maintaining their friendship.

== Cast and characters ==
- Vladimír Kobielsky as Marek Bobula
- Filip Tůma as Vladimir Bielik
- Marek Fašiang as MVDr. Tomas Oravec
- Branislav Deák as JUDr as Alexander "Alex" Becker – a businessman
- Karina Qayumová as Nina Bobulova
- Izabela Gavorníková as Viktória, "Viky" Bobulová
- Patrik Kučera as Marek "Marecek" Bobula
- Oliver Oswald as Lukáš "Luky" Bielik
- Jakub Horák as Filip "Fifo", "Fifko" Bielik
- Maroš Baňas as Jakub "Kubo" Bielik
- Tobias Král as Maximilian, "Max", "Maxo", Alexander Drobný – Alex and Sisa's son
- Laura Gavaldová as Júlia, "Julka" Oravcová
- Mária Havranová as Linda Mackova (1st–3rd season) – Tomáš' girlfriend who later abandoned him and began a relationship with Jaroslav
- Eva Pavlíková as MUDr. Marika Vágnerová – Julia's grandmother and Tomáš's mother-in-law (1st season)
- Monika Hilmerová as Lucia Bobulova Bielikova
- Zuzana Mauréry as Tamara Makova Bobulova
- Natália Puklušová as Petra "Zajko" Horváthová (1st, 2nd, and 6th season)
- Dominika Kavaschová as Silva "Sisa" Dorbná – Max's mother and Alex's wife
- Zuzana Porubjaková as Simona, Strašiftáková (1st−5th season)
- Zuzana Kraváriková as Dorota "Dorka" Šìpkoviá – Luky's girlfriend
- Richard Labuda as Dominik – Nina's boyfriend (from 3rd season)
- Jana Kovalčíková as JUDr Ema Horváthová – Ondra's wife, but still loves Alex
- Marián Mitaš as Jaroslav, "Jaro" Szabo – Linda ex-fiancé
- Gabriela Dzuríková as Jarmila

== Series overview ==
| Season | Episodes | Originally aired | | Timeslot (CET) | Network |
| Season | Episodes | First aired | Last aired | Timeslot (CET) | Network |
|---|---|---|---|---|---|
| 1 | 110 | January 1, 2018 | June 7, 2018 | Monday 18:10 (pilot part) Monday–Friday 17:55 | Markíza |
| 1 | 69 | September 3, 2018 | December 7, 2018 | Monday – Friday 17:55 Friday 17:55 | Markíza |
| Christmas with Dads | | December 24, 2018 | | Monday 19:00 | Markíza |
| 2 | 110 | January 14, 2019 | June 14, 2019 | Monday – Friday 17:55 | Markíza |
| 2 | 70 | September 2, 2019 | December 6, 2019 | Monday – Friday 17:55 | Markíza |
| Christmas miracle | | December 24, 2019 | | Tuesday 18:45 | Markíza |
| 3 | 53 | January 13, 2020 | April 1, 2020 | Monday – Friday 17:55 (1 –40) Monday – Thursday 17:55 (41–44) Monday – Wednesday 17:55 (45 – 53) | Markíza |
| 3 | 70 | August 31, 2020 | December 4, 2020 | Monday – Friday 17:55 | Markíza |
| Christmas special | | December 18, 2020 | | Friday 20:30 | Markíza |
| 4 | 110 | January 11, 2021 | June 11, 2021 | Monday – Friday 17:55 | Markíza |
| 4 | 70 | August 30, 2021 | December 3, 2021 | Monday – Friday 17:55 | Markíza |
| Christmas surprise | | December 24, 2021 | | Friday 19:00 | Markíza |
| 5 | 110 | January 10, 2022 | June 10, 2022 | Monday – Friday 17:55 | Markíza |

== Awards and nominations ==
| Year | Organization | Result |
|---|---|---|
| 2018 | OTO Award for TV Series | Won |
