= Desmod =

Slovak pop rock band

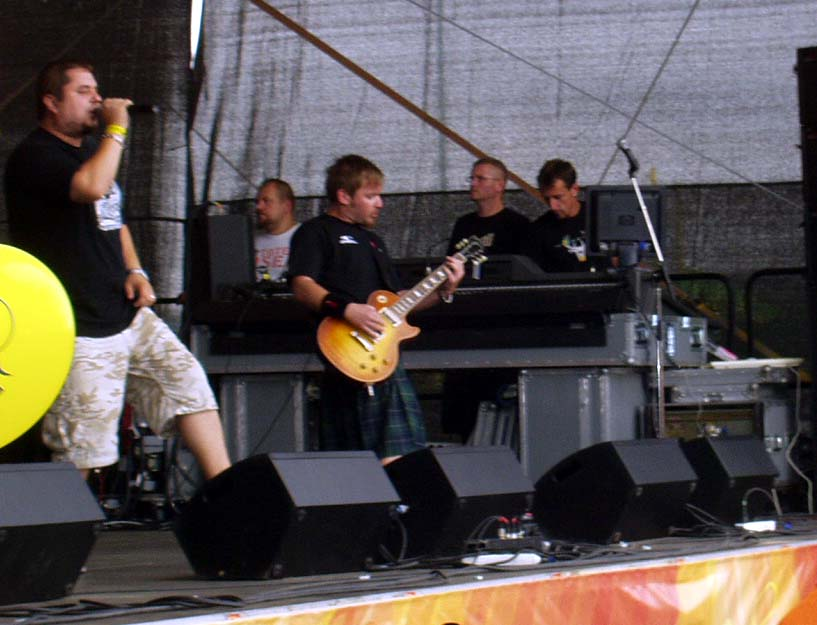
- Desmond performing in 2007

Background information
- Origin: Nitra, Slovakia
- Genres: Rock, Pop rock
- Years active: 1996-present
- Members: Mário "Kuly" Kollár; Dušan Minka; Jano Škorec; Rišo Synčák; Rišo Nagy
- Website: www.desmod.sk

Desmod is a Slovak co-ed band that mainly plays mainstream pop-rock songs. It consists of Mário "Kuly" Kollár, Dušan Minka, Jano Škorec, Rišo Synčák, Rišo Nagy, and Michal Kožuch.

== History ==
The beginnings of Desmod took back to 1986, when the predecessor of the present-day Desmod was formed, a heavy-metal band from Nitra, playing mainly songs taken from Slovak and foreign artists. When the group's original "heavy-metal" line-up of the group disintegrated completely, it went through several line-up changes alternated the occupation of individual instruments in 1996.

== Members ==
- Kuly (born Mário Kollár; vocals)
- Juro Varga (bass guitar)
- Jano Škorec (drums)
- Mirka Kelbel (guitar)
- Adam Mičinec(guitar)

== Discography ==
=== Albums ===
- 001 (2000)
- Mám chuť (2001)
- Derylov svet (2003)
- Skupinová terapia (2004)
- Uhol pohľadu (2006)
- Kyvadlo (2007)
- Vitajte na konci sveta (2010)
- Iný rozmer (2011)
- Javorový album (2012)
- Molekuly zvuku (2017)

== See also ==
- The 100 Greatest Slovak Albums of All Time
