= Panelák (TV series) =

Slovak television series

- Genre: Soap opera
- Created by: Andrej Kraus
- Starring: Diana Mórová; Marián Miezga; Juraj Slezáček; Božidara Turzonovová; Vladimír Kobielsky; Miroslava Partlová; Branislav Bystriansky; Ján Koleník; Róbert Jakab; Zuzana Mauréry; Roman Luknár; Samuel Spišák; Zuzana Vačková; Andrea Karnasová; Andy Kraus; Viktória Ráková; Zuzana Tlučková; Karin Haydu
- Theme music composer: Desmod
- Opening theme: Lavíny
- Country of origin: Slovakia
- Original language: Slovak
- No. of seasons: 17
- No. of episodes: 1,351

Production
- Producers: Andrej Kraus; Pavel Bob
- Running time: 30–50 minutes
- Production companies: Továreň; Wider; Slovenská produkčná

Original release
- Network: TV JOJ
- Release: 18 February 2008 – 30 August 2017

Panelák is a Slovak daily television series that aired from 2008 until 2017 on TV JOJ. In Slovak, panelák means "block of flats". The soap opera follows the lives of a group of people living in an apartment building.

== Background ==
Panelák originally aired for fifteen seasons from 18 February 2008 until 17 June 2015 as a daily series, becoming the longest-running television show in Slovak history. In 2017, it was brought back for one more season upon its fifteenth anniversary, from 29 March until 30 August. The soap opera is loosely connected to the earlier Slovak series Susedia (Neighbours), broadcast by Markíza from 2006 until 2007, and later rebooted in 2018. The creator of Panelák, Andrej Kraus, had worked on the older show as well. The two series also shared some cast members, including Kraus himself, and Viktória Ráková. The two actors also worked together on the sitcom Kutyil s.r.o.

The show featured appearances by both domestic and international celebrities, including singers Anastacia, Celeste Buckingham, Sisa Sklovská, Zuzana Smatanová, Richard Müller, and Ján Lehotský; tennis player Daniela Hantuchová; and hockey players Marek Uram and Sasu Hovi. Slovak pop rock band Desmod, who wrote the show's title song, also made an appearance.

== Selected cast and characters ==
- Diana Mórová as Ivana Schwarzová
- Marián Miezga as Michal Bajza
- Juraj Slezáček as Prof. Emil Blichár
- Božidara Turzonovová as Jana Nitschneiderová
- Vladimír Kobielsky as Jakub Švehla
- Miroslava Partlová as Mária "Angie" Kordiaková
- Branislav Bystriansky as Imrich "Imro" Bystrický
- Ján Koleník as Marcel "Maslák" Maslovič
- Róbert Jakab as Karol Mázik
- Zuzana Mauréry as Júlia "Julka" Chutná
- Roman Luknár as Dušan "Dudko" Jančo
- Samuel Spišák as Patrik Jančo
- Zuzana Vačková as Alica Rybáriková
- Andrea Karnasová as Denisa Bačová
- Andy Kraus as Alexander "Alex" Božský
- Viktória Ráková as Agáta Fodrászová
- Zuzana Tlučková as Andrea "Ajuška" Cinege
- Karin Haydu as Daniela Kordiaková
- Slávka Halčáková as Sára
