= List of Slovak films of the 2000s =

A List of Slovak films of the 2000s.

English title	Slovak title	Director	Cast, notes	Genre	Year	Co-production
Thomas the Falconer	Sokoliar Tomáš	Václav Vorlíček	Braňo Holíček, Juraj Kukura, Klára Jandová	Family	2000	Czech Republic; Poland; Hungary
Landscape	Krajinka	Martin Šulík	Juraj Paulen, Anton Vaculík, Vilma Cibulková, Csongor Kassai; Slovakia's submission to the 73rd Academy Awards for the Academy Award for Best Foreign Language Film	Drama	2000	Czech Republic
Love Me If You Dare	Vadí nevadí	Eva Borušovičová	Drahomír Frank, Milan Mikulčík, Anna Šišková, Dušan Cinkota	Action comedy	2001	
Hannah and Her Brothers	Hana a jej bratia	Vladimír Adásek	Martin Keder, Marta Zuchová	Comedy, gay	2001	
Rain Falls on Our Souls	Dážď padá na naše duše	Vlado Balco	Stano Dančiak, Alexandra Záborská, Jiří Maria Sieber	Drama	2002	
Cruel Joys	Kruté radosti	Juraj Nvota	Táňa Pauhofová, Ondřej Vetchý, Milan Mikulčík, Anna Šišková; Slovakia's submission to the 75th Academy Awards for the Academy Award for Best Foreign Language Film	Comedy/drama	2002	Czech Republic
The Power of Good: Nicholas Winton	Sila ľudskosti - Nicholas Winton	Matej Mináč		Documentary	2002	Czech Republic
Escape to Budapest	Útek do Budína	Miloslav Luther	Lenka Vlasáková, Ondřej Sokol, Boleslav Polívka	Drama	2002	Czech Republic; Hungary
Quartétto	Quartétto	Laura Siváková	Janko Kroner, Klára Dubovicová, Diana Mórová, Zuzana Mauréry	Drama	2002	Czech Republic
The Devil Knows Why	Čert vie prečo	Roman Vávra	Tatiana Pauhofová, Iva Janžurová, Josef Somr	Comedy	2003	Czech Republic; Germany
Faithless Games	Nevěrné hry	Michaela Pavlátová	Zuzana Stivínová, Peter Bebjak, Vladimír Hajdu	Tragicomedy	2003	
It Will Stay Between Us	Zostane to medzi nami	Miroslav Šindelka	Tomáš Hanák, Danica Jurčová, Michal Dlouhý	Drama	2003	
Two Syllables Behind	O dve slabiky pozadu	Katarína Šulajová	Zuzana Šulajová, Anna Ferenczy, Mikuláš Křen	Drama	2004	
Konečná stanica	Konečná stanica	Jiří Chlumský	Josef Abrhám, Zdena Studenková, Anna Šišková, Diana Mórová	Comedy	2004	
Here We Are	My zdes	Jaroslav Vojtek		Documentary	2005	
Lunacy	Šílení	Jan Švankmajer	Pavel Liška, Jan Tříska, Anna Geislerová, Martin Huba	Horror	2005	Czech Republic
The City of the Sun	Slnečný štát alebo hrdinovia robotníckej triedy	Martin Šulík	Ivan Martinka, Luboš Kostelný; Slovakia's submission to the 78th Academy Awards for the Academy Award for Best Foreign Language Film	Tragicomedy	2005	Czech Republic
Other Worlds	Iné svety	Marko Škop		Documentary	2006	
Meeting the Enemy	Rozhovor s nepriateľom	Patrik Lančarič	Marko Igonda, Alexander Bárta, Boris Farkaš, Marián Labuda ml.	Drama	2007	
Return of the Storks	Návrat Bocianov	Martin Repka	Katharina Lorenz, Florian Stetter, Lukáš Latinák, Zuzana Mauréry; Slovakia's submission to the 80th Academy Awards for the Academy Award for Best Foreign Language Film	Romantic drama	2007	Germany
Martin Slivka	Martin Slivka	Martin Šulík	film about filmmaker	Documentary	2007	
Half Breakdown	Polčas rozpadu	Vlado Fischer	Janko Kroner, Tatiana Pauhofová	Drama	2007	
Blind Loves	Slepé lásky	Juraj Lehotský	Film about love between non-sighted people Slovakia's submission to the 81st Academy Awards for the Academy Award for Best Foreign Language Film	Documentary	2008	
Bathory	Bathory	Juraj Jakubisko	Anna Friel, Karel Roden, Vincent Regan, Franco Nero	History drama	2008	Czech Republic; United Kingdom; Hungary
Take It Jeasy!	Ježiš je normálny!	Tereza Nvotová		Documentary	2008	Czech Republic
Music	Muzika	Juraj Nvota	Táňa Pauhofová, Luboš Kostelný, Marián Geišberg, Csongor Kassai	Comedy	2008	Germany
Last Caravan	Posledná maringotka	Peter Beňovský		Documentary	2008	
Cinka Panna	Cinka Panna	Dušan Rapoš	Anna Gurji, Martin Huba, Zuzana Kronerová, Jozef Vajda	History drama	2008	Czech Republic; Hungary
The Tango with Mosquitos	Tango s komármi	Miloslav Luther	Roman Luknár, Vlado Hajdu, Tereza Brodská, Tereza Nvotová, Diana Mórová	Comedy drama	2009	Czech Republic
Soul at Peace	Pokoj v duši	Vladimír Balko	Attila Mokos, Roman Luknár, Helena Krajčiová, Robert Wieckiewicz	Drama	2009	
Cooking History	Ako sa varia dejiny	Peter Kerekes		Documentary	2009	Czech Republic; Austria
Big Respect	Veľký rešpekt	Viktor Csudai	Števo Martinovič, Stano Staško, Dáša Šarkózyová, Peter Oszlík	Comedy	2009	
Heaven, Hell... Earth	Nebo, peklo... zem	Laura Siváková	Zuzana Kanócz, Jiří Korn, Lukáš Latinák, Dagmar Bláhová	Drama	2009	
Broken Promise	Nedodržaný sl’ub	Jiří Chlumský	Ondřej Vetchý, Zuzana Porubjaková, Peter Oszlík, Samuel Spišák; Slovakia's submission to the 82nd Academy Awards for the Academy Award for Best Foreign Language Film	Drama	2009	Czech Republic; United States
My Husband's Women	Ženy môjho muža	Ivan Vojnár	Zdena Studenková, Martin Stropnický, Vladimír Dlouhý	Drama	2009	Czech Republic
Bratislavafilm	Bratislavafilm	Jakub Kroner	Zuzana Fialová, Peter Batthyany, Robert Roth, Róbert Jakab	Drama	2009	
Osadné	Osadné	Marko Škop		Documentary	2009	
The Moon Inside You	Mesiac v nás	Diana Fabiánová		Documentary	2009	Spain; France
Malý zúrivý Robinson	Malý zúrivý Robinson	Martina Diosi		Documentary	2009	
Čas grimás	Čas grimás	Peter Dimitrov		Documentary, drama	2009	
The Border	Hranica	Jaroslav Vojtek	Slovakia's submission to the 83rd Academy Awards for the Academy Award for Best Foreign Language Film	Documentary	2009	
Erotic Nation	Erotic Nation	Peter Begányi		Documentary	2009	Czech Republic

Minority co-production participation:

Country	English title	Slovak title	Director	Cast	Genre	Year
Czech Republic	The Pilgrimage of Students Peter and Jacob	Správa o putovaní študentov Petra a Jakuba	Drahomíra Vihanová	Anton Vaculík, Václav Chalupa, Zuzana Stivínová	Drama	2000
Czech Republic	Želary	Želary	Ondřej Trojan	Aňa Geislerová, Iva Bittová, František Velecký, György Cserhalmi	Romantic drama	2003
Netherlands	King of Thieves	Kráľ zlodejov	Ivan Fíla	Heinz Hoenig, Lazar Ristovski, Katharina Thalbach, Birol Ünel	Drama	2004
Hungary	The Unburied Man	Nepochovaný mŕtvy	Márta Mészáros	Jan Nowicki, György Cserhalmi	Drama	2004
Belgium	Friday or Another Day	Piatok alebo iný deň	Yvan Le Moine	Philippe Grand'Henry, Ornella Muti, Philippe Nahon, Hanna Schygulla	Adventurous	2005
Belgium	Bye Bye Harry!	Zbohom, Harry!	Robert Young	Tim Dutton, Bela B. Felsenheimer	Comedy	2006
Czech Republic	I Served the King of England	Obsluhoval som anglického krála	Jiří Menzel	Martin Huba, Marián Labuda	Comedy, romance	2006
Czech Republic	Little Girl Blue	Tajnosti	Alice Nellis	Iva Bittová, Anna Šišková, Karel Roden, Ivan Franěk	Drama/comedy	2007
United Kingdom	The Last Legion	Posledná légia	Doug Lefler	Colin Firth, Ben Kingsley, James Cosmo	War, adventure	2007
Czech Republic	Roming	Roming	Jiří Vejdělek	Marián Labuda, Boleslav Polívka, Vítězslav Holub, Jean Constantin	Comedy	2007
Poland	Strawberry Wine	Jahodové víno	Dariusz Jabłoński	Zuzana Fialová, Marian Dziedziel, Jiří Macháček	Drama	2008
Czech Republic	Tobruk	Tobruk	Václav Marhoul	Jan Meduna, Petr Vaněk, Robert Nebřenský, Kryštof Rímský	War-drama	2008
Poland	Janosik: A True Story	Jánošík - Pravdivá história	Kasia Adamik, Agnieszka Holland	Václav Jiráček, Ivan Martinka, Michal Zebrowski	History	2009
Czech Republic	Eye in the Wall	Oko ve zdi	Miloš J. Kohout	Karl Roden, Soňa Valentová, Jürgen Prochnow	Thriller	2009
Czech Republic	3 Seasons in Hell	Tri sezóny v pekle	Tomáš Mašín	Kryštof Hádek, Karolina Gruszka, Martin Huba	Historic drama	2009
Czech Republic	Darkness	T.M.A.	Juraj Herz	Ivan Franěk, Lenka Krobotová, Andrej Hryc	Horror	2009
