= Za sklom (TV series) =

Slovak police procedural television series

- Genre: Police procedural Political thriller
- Created by: Roland Kubina
- Written by: Valeria Schulczová; Roman Olekšák
- Directed by: Peter Bebjak; Róbert Šveda; Zuzana Marianková; Michal Blaško
- Starring: Tomáš Maštalír; Ján Koleník; Kamila Magálová; Jiří Bartoška; Milan Ondrík; Rebeka Poláková; Zuzana Kanócz; Táňa Pauhofová; Jana Kolesárová
- Theme music composer: Korben Dallas
- Opening theme: "Za sklom"
- Composers: Korben Dallas; Igor "Ozo" Guttler; Lukáš Fila; Ľuboslav Petruška; Tomáš Baľak; Emil Smoliga
- Country of origin: Slovakia
- Original languages: Slovak; Czech; English; Ukrainian
- No. of seasons: 3
- No. of episodes: 26

Production
- Executive producer: Natália Rau Guziliewiczová
- Producers: Roland Kubina; Sláva Adamíková; Rastislav Šesták; Peter Bebjak
- Cinematography: Martin Rau
- Editor: Marek Kráľovský
- Running time: 54–69 minutes
- Production companies: DNA Production; Slovenská produkčná

Original release
- Network: JOJ
- Release: 28 September 2016 – 12 November 2019

Za sklom (transl. Behind the Glass) is a Slovak police procedural television series created by a program director of TV JOJ Roland Kubina and produced by DNA Production. Series, which is inspired by real life, debuted on 28 September 2016 and tells the story of two elite cops who eventually find themselves on the opposite side of the law.

On 13 January 2017, JOJ confirmed the second season, which premiered on November 8, 2017. On 17 July 2018 it was announced that the series was renewed for the third and final season, which was inspired by the murder of reporter Ján Kuciak and his fiancé Martina Kušnírová. The third season premiered on 1 October 2019. The series ended on 12 November 2019.

== Cast and characters ==
=== Main ===
Name	Portrayed by	Description	Seasons		
Name	Portrayed by	Description	1	2	3
Major Tibor "Maxo" Maxovský	Tomáš Maštalír	An investigator from the NAKA anti-crime unit	Main		
Major Norbert "Noro" Višváder / Agent Patrik Vittek	Ján Koleník	An investigator from the NAKA anti-crime unit and SIS agent	Main		
Podpolkovnik Zora Ballová	Kamila Magálová	Chief of NAKA team. At the end of the first season she was forced to retire. In the third season, she is again the head of the NAKA anti-crime unit.	Main		
Vladimír Slančík	Jiří Bartoška	Businessman, mafia boss and Daniel's biological father	Main		
Juraj "Bongy" Bongrád	Milan Ondrík	Mafioso	Main		Flashback
Lena Antolová	Rebeka Poláková	Wife of cop Dávid Antol and Daniel's mother	Main	Recurring	
Poruchik Hana Letrichová	Zuzana Kanócz	An investigator from the NAKA anti-corruption unit		Main	Guest
Viktória Ballová	Táňa Pauhofová	Lawyer and daughter of Zora Ballová		Main	Recurring
Poruchik Silvia Oravská	Jana Kolesárová	Partner of Hana Letrichová and Ľudo Čierný			Main

=== Recurring ===
- Adam Jančina as Praporshchik Karol "Lajťák" Svetlý, police IT officer
- Tibor Vokoun as medical examiner (seasons 1 & 2: recurring; season three: guest)
- Žofia Martišová as Mrs. Maxovská, Maxo's grandmother (seasons 1 & 2)
- Jaroslav Mottl as Andrej "Rohan" Roháč, SIS agent
- Barbora Andrešičová as Patrícia Brunovská, reporter
- Juraj Rašla as Roman Malec, an investigator from the Bureau of the Inspection Service of the Ministry of the Interior of the Slovak Republic. In the second season, he became the temporary head of the NAKA investigation team and during the third season he became the new president of the Police Force of the Slovak Republic.
- Ľuboš Kostelný as mafioso Marián "Tajson" Blánka, Slovak mafia boss (season one)
- Oliver Hrubý as Daniel "Danko" Antol, son of Lena Antolová (seasons 1 & 2)
- Martin "Mako" Hindy as Tajson's and Slančík's bodyguard (seasons 1 & 2)
- Noël Czuczor as Riky, Slančík's right hand and Mossad agent (season two)
- Jevgenij Libezňuk as Česlav "Ear" Kupko, Ukrainian mafia boss (season two)
- Milan Kňažko as Milan Solan, retired member of Interpol and former Zora Ballová's boss (season two)
- Ján Jackuliak as Peter Drapák, mafioso and arms dealer (season two)
- Alexander Bárta as Podporuchik Braňo "Babka" Dušan, an investigator from NAKA (season two); an investigator from the Bureau of the Inspection Service of the Ministry of the Interior of the Slovak Republic and the new director of the Inspection Service of the Ministry of the Interior of the Slovak Republic (season three)
- Michal Ďuriš as Košický, Slančík's lawyer (seasons 1 & 2: recurring; season three: guest)
- Maroš Kramár as businessman and mafioso Marián "Belly" Vozner (seasons 2 & 3)
- Zuzana Mauréry as Jana "Orca" Balogová, State Secretary of the Ministry of Defence of the Slovak Republic. At the end of the second season she will become the Minister of Defense of the Slovak Republic and during the third season she will become the Minister of Interior of the Slovak Republic. (seasons 2 & 3)
- Adrian Jastraban as Senior lieutenant Ľudovít "Ľudo" Čierny, a new partner of Silvia Oravská (season three)
- Roman Luknár as Chief, chairman of the Government Party and Prime Minister of the Slovak Republic. After death of an investigative reporter he lost his post. (season three)
- Gregor Hološka as Fúzatý, Minister of the Interior of the Slovak Republic. After death of an investigative reporter he lost his post. (season two: guest; season three: recurring)
- Jozef Vajda as Slavo "Grandpa" Kučera, businessman and Haspra's brother-in-law (season three)
- Predrag Bjelac as Tonino "Tony" Badala, Italian businessman and mafioso (season three)
- Darina Abrahámová as Mrs. Marica Vdovjaková, businesswoman (season three)
- Marián Mitaš as Adam Bartovič, an investigative reporter of the portal Aktuality.sk (season three)
- Vladimír Černý as editor in chief of the portal Aktuality.sk (season three)
- Martin Mňahončák as Libor Haspra, former president of the Police Force of the Slovak Republic (season three)
- Pavol Višňovský as Borsó, director of NAKA (season three)

=== Guest stars ===
==== Season 1 ====
- Juraj Loj as Captain Dávid Antol, cop from NAKA, husband of Lena Antolová and Daniel's father
- Gejza Benkő as Jozef "Fistman" Mazurek
- Martin Nahálka as Drobný
- Vladislav Šarišský as Vitalij
- Pavol Michalka as Minister of the Interior of the Slovak Republic
- Ivana Kubačková as Petra Valentová, masseuse
- Zuzana Porubjaková as herself
- Eva Landlová as old woman
- Viktória Predanociová as Slávka

==== Season 2 ====
- Jakub Kuka as "Kobalt" Rovňák
- Vladislav Šarišský as Vitalij
- Štefan Bučko as Minister of Defence of the Slovak Republic
- Peter Vaco as Pavol Poliak
- Barhum Nakhlé as Rafik bin Talal
- Vasil Rusinak as Oleg Novikov
- Katarína Feldeková as prisoner Kováčová
- Milada Rajzíková as Mária Husárová, Max's mother
- Martin Horňák as Rudolf Husár, Max's stepfather
- Peter Cibula as a lawyer

==== Season 3 ====
- Zuzana Moravcová as Svetlana Dušanová (née Javorová), Babka's wife
- Barbora Palčíková as Mária "Majka" Drobná, former Main State Assistant and Chief's assistant and lover
- Milena Minichová as Alena "Aja" Žulová
- Roman Fratrič as director of the cooperative
- Martin Šalacha as Andrej Palček, businessman and hotel owner
- Dominika Richterová as Monika Schön, Badala's mistress and beauty contest finalist
- Michaela Majerníková as Beáta Rosnová, police officer
- Romana Dang Van as masseuse
- Daniela Gudabová as Mrs. Čabajová, Zdeno's mother
- Michal Tomasy as Zdeno Čabaj
- Peter Cibula as a lawyer
- Juraj Hrčka as Slovák, Vozner's henchman
- Juraj Bača as Daniel Boroteli, employee of the Office of the Ministry of the Interior of the Slovak Republic for the Protection of Constitutional Officials
- Milan Mikulčík as Richtár, Vdovjaková's henchman
- Peter Brajerčík as Zoltán "Zolo" Andrašovan
- Andrej Šoltés as Tomáš Samo
- Braňo Mosný as Miroslav "Miro" Miček

=== The similarity of the characters to real people ===
Officially, the similarities of the characters to real people are purely coincidental, but viewers have noticed that some of the characters, mostly politicians, are very familiar:

- Milan Ondrík - Juraj "Bongy" Bongrád reminds mafioso Peter Čongrády;
- Gejza Benkő - Jozef "Fistman" Mazurek as extremist reminds the member of National Council of the Slovak Republic for the People's Party Milan Mazurek;
- Maroš Kramár - Marián "Belly" Vozner as businessman and mafioso reminds Marián Kočner;
- Peter Vaco - Pavol Poliak as businessman reminds Pavol Rusko;
- Roman Luknár - Chief as chairman of the Government Party and Prime Minister of the Slovak Republic, who lost his post after the journalist's murder, reminds Robert Fico;
- Gregor Hološka - Fúzatý as the Minister of the Interior, who lost his post after the journalist's murder, reminds Robert Kaliňák;
- Zuzana Mauréry - Jana "Orca" Balogová as new Minister of the Interior of the Slovak Republic reminds Denisa Saková;
- Jozef Vajda - Slavo "Grandpa" Kučera as owner of the security service with links to the government reminds of the Nitra oligarch Miroslav Bödör;
- Martin Mňahončák - Libor Haspra as president of the Police Force of the Slovak Republic reminds Tibor Gašpar;
- Juraj Rašla - Roman Malec with his villa in Florida and his appointment as president of the Police Force of the Slovak Republic reminds Milan Lučanský;
- Pavol Višňovský - Borsó as director of NAKA reminds Peter Hraško. Unlike the real Peter Hraško, Borsó was at the scene of the murder of a reporter and his fiancée, as well as the then head of the anti-corruption unit NAKA and Hraško's direct subordinate Robert Krajmer;
- Darina Abrahámová - Mrs. Marica Vdovjaková as businesswoman from Eastern Slovakia with fraudulent agrodotations, deputy and member of the government party reminds Ľubica Rošková;
- Predrag Bjelac - Tonino "Tony" Badala as Italian businessman and mafioso reminds Antonino Vadala;
- Marián Mitaš - Adam Bartovič as investigative reporter of the portal Aktuality.sk reminds Marek Vagovič;
- Vladimír Černý - editor in chief of the portal Aktuality.sk reminds Peter Bárdy;
- Barbora Palčíková - Majka Drobná as Main State Assistant and prime minister's assistant and lover reminds Mária Trošková;
- Milena Minichová - Alena "Aja" Žulová as Vozner's assistant a reminds Alena Zsuzsová;
- Juraj Hrčka - Slovák as Vozner's henchman reminds a former journalist Peter Tóth;
- Peter Cibula - Vozner's lawyer reminds Kočner's lawyer Marek Para;
- Peter Brajerčík - Zoltán "Zolo" Andrašovan as mediator between assistant and reporter's murderers reminds Zoltán Andruskó;
- Andrej Šoltés - Tomáš Samo as one of two reporter's murderers reminds Tomáš Szabó;
- Braňo Mosný - Miroslav "Miro" Miček as one of two reporter's murderers reminds Miroslav Marček;
- character that is only mentioned in the series - Usurer as president of the Slovak Republic reminds Andrej Kiska;
- character that is only mentioned in the series - Paľo as murdered investigative reporter reminds Ján Kuciak;
- character that is only mentioned in the series - Paľo's fiancé reminds murdered archaeologist Martina Kušnírová;
- character that is only mentioned in the series - Chief's brother, whereof wrote series reporter Paľo, reminds Fico's brother Ladislav, whereof Ján Kuciak wrote;
- character that is only mentioned in the series - Captain / Rigoróz / Rigoróznik as chairman of the National Council of the Slovak Republic and chairman of the Government Party reminds Andrej Danko;
- character that is only mentioned in the series - Blond that need to be scared as a lawyer who is struggling with the Pezinok landfill, reminds Zuzana Čaputová;
- character that is only mentioned in the series - Harakter reminds Béla Bugár;
- character that is only mentioned in the series - former constitutional lawyer, one who died long ago, reminds Ernest Valko.

== Production ==
The series for JOJ was shot by DNA Production, which in the past produced the TV series Dr. Ludsky and Dr. Dokonalý. Due to the many action and stunt scenes, the actors underwent special trainings. Róbert Šveda is one of the directors of the series. The series is so far the most time-consuming series of JOJ, due to filming on film cameras. Many scenes were also shot using drones. Scenes such as explosions, chases and gunfights are handled with special effects. According to Marcel Grega, general director of TV JOJ, the series is "the best criminal in Slovakia so far". The second season was shot in the summer of 2017. The third season was shot in the summer of 2019.

== Theme song ==
Theme song has the same title as the series itself. The song "Za sklom" is on the third ("Banská Bystrica") and fourth album ("Kam ideme") of the Bratislava band Korben Dallas.

== Sanction ==
On 23 March 2017, the Council for Broadcasting and Retransmission imposed a fine of €5000 on JOJ for the first part of the series for the first episode of the series which was to be "due to the content of vulgar and obscene expression and depiction of erotic aids marked as inappropriate for minors under 18", that would mean postponing broadcast until 22:00.

== Broadcasting ==
After airing of the first episode of the second season, TV series pulled off the broadcast. They justified this by low viewership due to unattractive airtime. There have been suspicions that external political pressures are behind the TV series pulled off the broadcast, whereas the series highlights political causes, tax fraud, corruption, the linking of politicians and the mafia, or the intervention of the Minister of the Interior and the President in the investigation. JOJ refused any external interference with the broadcast. The second season returned to air on 2 May 2018.

== Episodes ==
Series	Episodes	Originally released	
Series	Episodes	First released	Last released
1	8	28 September 2016	16 November 2016
2	8	8 November 2017	23 May 2018
3	10	1 October 2019	12 November 2019

=== Season 1 (2016) ===
No. overall	No. in season	Title	Directed by	Written by	Original release date
1	1	"Episode 1"	Peter Bebjak, Róbert Šveda & Zuzana Marianková	Valeria Schulczová	28 September 2016
2	2	"Episode 2"	Peter Bebjak, Róbert Šveda & Zuzana Marianková	Valeria Schulczová	5 October 2016
3	3	"Episode 3"	Peter Bebjak, Róbert Šveda & Zuzana Marianková	Valeria Schulczová	12 October 2016
4	4	"Episode 4"	Peter Bebjak, Róbert Šveda & Zuzana Marianková	Valeria Schulczová	19 October 2016
5	5	"Episode 5"	Peter Bebjak, Róbert Šveda & Zuzana Marianková	Valeria Schulczová	26 October 2016
6	6	"Episode 6"	Peter Bebjak, Róbert Šveda & Zuzana Marianková	Valeria Schulczová	2 November 2016
7	7	"Episode 7"	Peter Bebjak, Róbert Šveda & Zuzana Marianková	Valeria Schulczová	9 November 2016
8	8	"Episode 8"	Peter Bebjak, Róbert Šveda & Zuzana Marianková	Valeria Schulczová	16 November 2016

=== Season 2 (2017–18) ===
No. overall	No. in season	Title	Directed by	Written by	Original release date
9	1	"Episode 1"	Peter Bebjak, Róbert Šveda & Michal Blaško	Valeria Schulczová & Roman Olekšák	8 November 2017
10	2	"Episode 2"	Peter Bebjak, Róbert Šveda & Michal Blaško	Roman Olekšák	2 May 2018
11	3	"Episode 3"	Peter Bebjak, Róbert Šveda & Michal Blaško	Valeria Schulczová & Roman Olekšák	8 May 2018
12	4	"Episode 4"	Peter Bebjak, Róbert Šveda & Michal Blaško	Valeria Schulczová & Roman Olekšák	9 May 2018
13	5	"Episode 5"	Peter Bebjak, Róbert Šveda & Michal Blaško	Valeria Schulczová & Roman Olekšák	15 May 2018
14	6	"Episode 6"	Peter Bebjak, Róbert Šveda & Michal Blaško	Valeria Schulczová & Roman Olekšák	16 May 2018
15	7	"Episode 7"	Peter Bebjak, Róbert Šveda & Michal Blaško	Valeria Schulczová & Roman Olekšák	22 May 2018
16	8	"Episode 8"	Peter Bebjak, Róbert Šveda & Michal Blaško	Valeria Schulczová & Roman Olekšák	23 May 2018

=== Season 3 (2019) ===
No. overall	No. in season	Title	Directed by	Written by	Original release date
17	1	"Episode 1"	Peter Bebjak, Róbert Šveda & Michal Blaško	Valeria Schulczová & Roman Olekšák	1 October 2019
18	2	"Episode 2"	Peter Bebjak, Róbert Šveda & Michal Blaško	Valeria Schulczová & Roman Olekšák	8 October 2019
19	3	"Episode 3"	Peter Bebjak, Róbert Šveda & Michal Blaško	Valeria Schulczová & Roman Olekšák	15 October 2019
20	4	"Episode 4"	Peter Bebjak, Róbert Šveda & Michal Blaško	Valeria Schulczová & Roman Olekšák	22 October 2019
21	5	"Episode 5"	Peter Bebjak, Róbert Šveda & Michal Blaško	Valeria Schulczová & Roman Olekšák	29 October 2019
22	6	"Episode 6"	Peter Bebjak, Róbert Šveda & Michal Blaško	Valeria Schulczová & Roman Olekšák	29 October 2019
23	7	"Episode 7"	Peter Bebjak, Róbert Šveda & Michal Blaško	Valeria Schulczová & Roman Olekšák	5 November 2019
24	8	"Episode 8"	Peter Bebjak, Róbert Šveda & Michal Blaško	Valeria Schulczová & Roman Olekšák	5 November 2019
25	9	"Episode 9"	Peter Bebjak, Róbert Šveda & Michal Blaško	Valeria Schulczová & Roman Olekšák	12 November 2019
26	10	"Episode 10"	Peter Bebjak, Róbert Šveda & Michal Blaško	Valeria Schulczová & Roman Olekšák	12 November 2019

== Awards and nominations ==
Year	Award	Category	Nominees	Result	Ref
2019	OTO Awards	Plus 7 dní Award for TV Act of the Year	Za sklom	Won	
