= Ján Kroner =

Slovak actor

- Born: 1 May 1927; Brunovce, Czechoslovakia
- Died: 24 June 1986 (aged 59); Považská Bystrica, ČSSR
- Other names: Króner (commonly misspelled)
- Occupation: Actor
- Years active: 1971–death
- Children: 3, including Janko Kroner
- Relatives: Jozef; Ľudovít (brothers) Jakub Kroner (grandson) Zuzana Kronerová (niece)

Ján Kroner (1 May 1927 – 24 June 1986) was a Slovak actor and one of the first generation members of the Kroner family. He was the youngest brother of Jozef, as well the father of Janko Kroner.

== Filmography ==
- 1971: Keby som mal pušku
- 1973: Dolina
- 1973: Očovské pastorále
- 1974: Oblaky - modriny (TV)
- 1975: Pacho, hybský zbojník
- 1975: Nepokojná láska (TV)
- 1976: Milosrdný čas
- 1983: Výlet do mladosti (TV)
- 1983: Mŕtvi učia živých
- 1984: Povstalecká história (TV)
- 1984: Neľahké lásky (TV)
- 1985: Materské znamienko (TV)
- 1985: Karabínka (TV)
- 1985: Búrka (TV)

== See also ==
- List of Czechoslovak films
- List of people surnamed Kroner
