= 11th OTO Awards =

11th OTO Awards

March 12, 2011

SND, Bratislava, Slovakia

Overall winner
Lukáš Latinák

Hall of Fame
Stanislav Dančiak

Život Award
Peter Bielik – Téma dňa

◄ 10th | 12th ►

The 11th OTO Awards, honoring the best in Slovak popular culture for the year 2010, took time and place on March 12, 2011 at the new premises of the Slovak National Theater in Bratislava. The ceremony broadcast live RTVS on 1. The host of the show was musician Marián Čekovský.

== Presenters ==
- Marián Čekovský
- Daniel Dangl
- Michal Hudák
- Róbert Jakab
- Juraj Kemka
- Daniel Krajcer
- Juraj Lelkes
- Marián Miezga
- Diana Mórová
- Lukáš Latinák
- Roman Pomajbo
- Stefan Skrúcaný
- Richard Stanke
- Peter Sklár
- Elena Vacvalová

== Performers ==
- Marián Čekovský, singer
- Martin Chodúr and Anita Soul, singers
- Sisa Sklovská, singer

== Winners and nominees ==
=== Main categories ===
Television

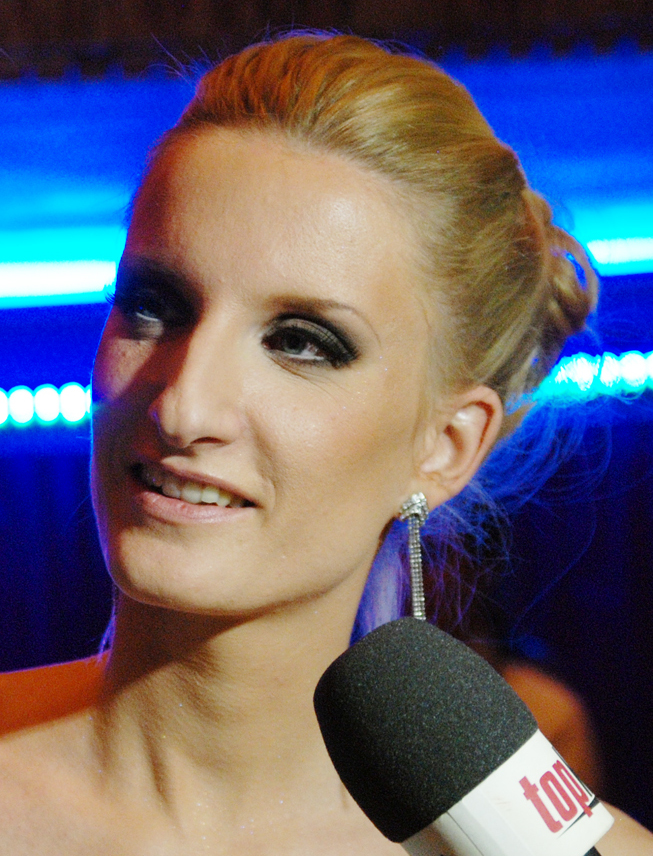
Adela Banášová

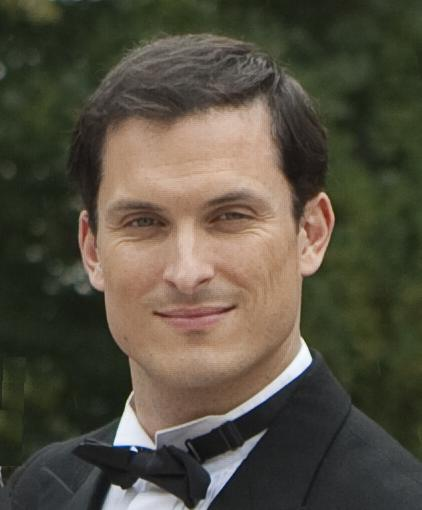
Ján Koleník

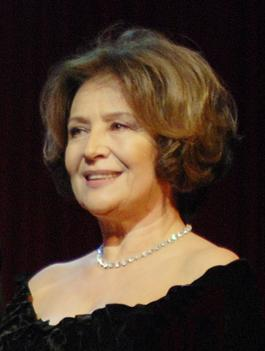
Emília Vášáryová

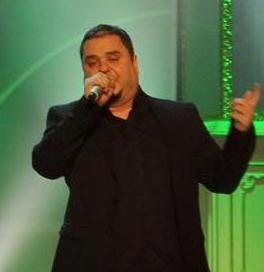
Mário Kollár alias "Kuly"

News Host	Sports Host or Commentator
★ Lucia Barmošová: Jarmila Lajčáková (née Hargašová); Miriam Šmahel (née Kalisová)	★ Peter Varinský: Lenka Čviriková (née Hriadelová); Ján Plesník
Journalist	Entertainer
★ Patrik Herman: Roman Juraško; Zlatica Švajdová (née Puškárová)	★ Adela Banášová: Martin Rausch; Viliam Rozboril
Drama Actor	Drama Actress
★ Ján Koleník: Janko Kroner; Ľuboš Kostelný	★ Emília Vášáryová: Diana Mórová; Gabriela Dzuríková
Comedy Actor	Comedy Actress
★ Lukáš Latinák: Ľuboš Kostelný; Janko Kroner	★ Petra Polnišová: Helena Krajčiová; Gabriela Dzuríková
Program	Show
★ Česko Slovensko má talent – JOJ: Let's Dance – Markíza; Talent Mánia	★ Partička – Markíza: Modré z neba – Markíza; Adela Show – Markíza
Series
★ Profesionáli – JOJ; Ordinácia v ružovej záhrade – Markíza; Panelák – JOJ

Music

Male Singer	Female Singer
★ Mário Kollár: Miroslav Žbirka; Richard Müller	★ Jana Kirschner: Zuzana Smatanová; Kristína

=== Others ===
Overall winner	★ Lukáš Latinák
Hall of Fame	★ Stanislav Dančiak
Život Award	★ Peter Bielik – Téma dňa – TA3

== Superlatives ==
=== Multiple nominees ===
2 nominations

- Gabriela Dzuríková
- Ľuboš Kostelný
- Janko Kroner
