= Za sklom =

Za sklom may refer to:

- Za sklom (song), song by Bratislava band Korben Dallas
- Za sklom (TV series), Slovak TV series
