= Rivers of Babylon (disambiguation) =

"Rivers of Babylon" is a song by The Melodians, notably covered by Boney M.

Rivers of Babylon or Waters of Babylon may also refer to:

- "By the rivers of Babylon" or "By the waters of Babylon", the first phrase from Psalm 137 from The Book of Psalms, the first book of the third section of Hebrew Bible and a book of the Old Testament.
- A 4-part round By the Waters of Babylon by Philip Hayes, closely paraphrasing the beginning of the above Psalm
- A 3-part round Babylon, based on Hayes' composition, included in American Pie (Don McLean album)
- Rivers of Babylon (novel), a novel by Peter Pišťanek
- Rivers of Babylon (film), a 1998 Slovak film
- By the Rivers of Babylon, a novel by Nelson DeMille
- "By the Waters of Babylon", a short story by Stephen Vincent Benét
- "By the Waters of Babylon: Little Poems in Prose" a poem by Emma Lazarus
- "Rivers of Babylon", a song by Sublime
- "By the Waters of Babylon", a song by Will Butler from his 2015 'Song a Day' project in collaboration with The Guardian
