= OTO Award for TV Male Actor =

OTO Award
TV Male Actor

Currently held by
Michal Hudák

First awarded | Last awarded
2000 | Present

OTO Award for TV Male Actor has been bestowed to the most recognized male actors of the past year in Slovakia since 2000. Between the years 2010 and 2011, the accolade was given in two acting categories, depending on a genre such as Drama and Comedy. Since 2012, the general category is held.

== Winners and nominees ==
=== 2000s ===
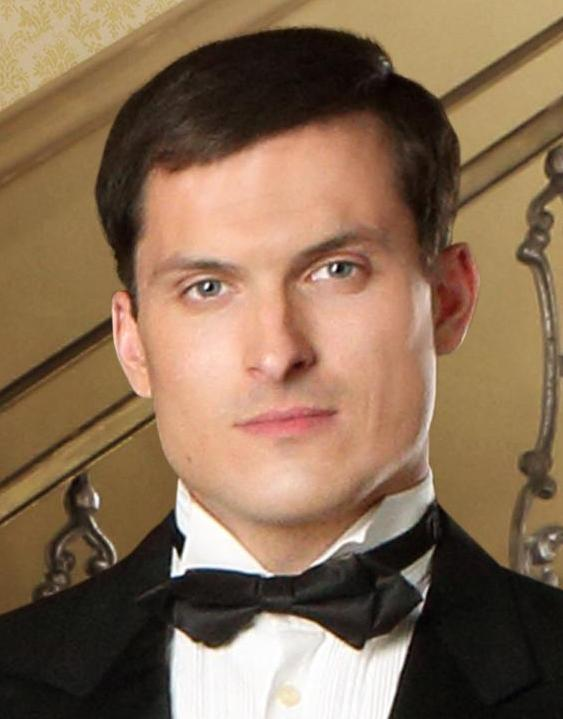
Ján Koleník has won at three consecutive occasions, twice in drama.

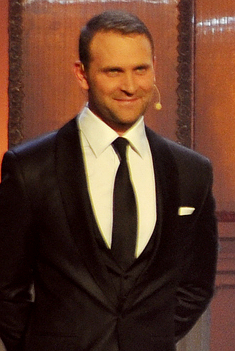
Tomáš Maštalír has been nominated three times, winning twice eventually.

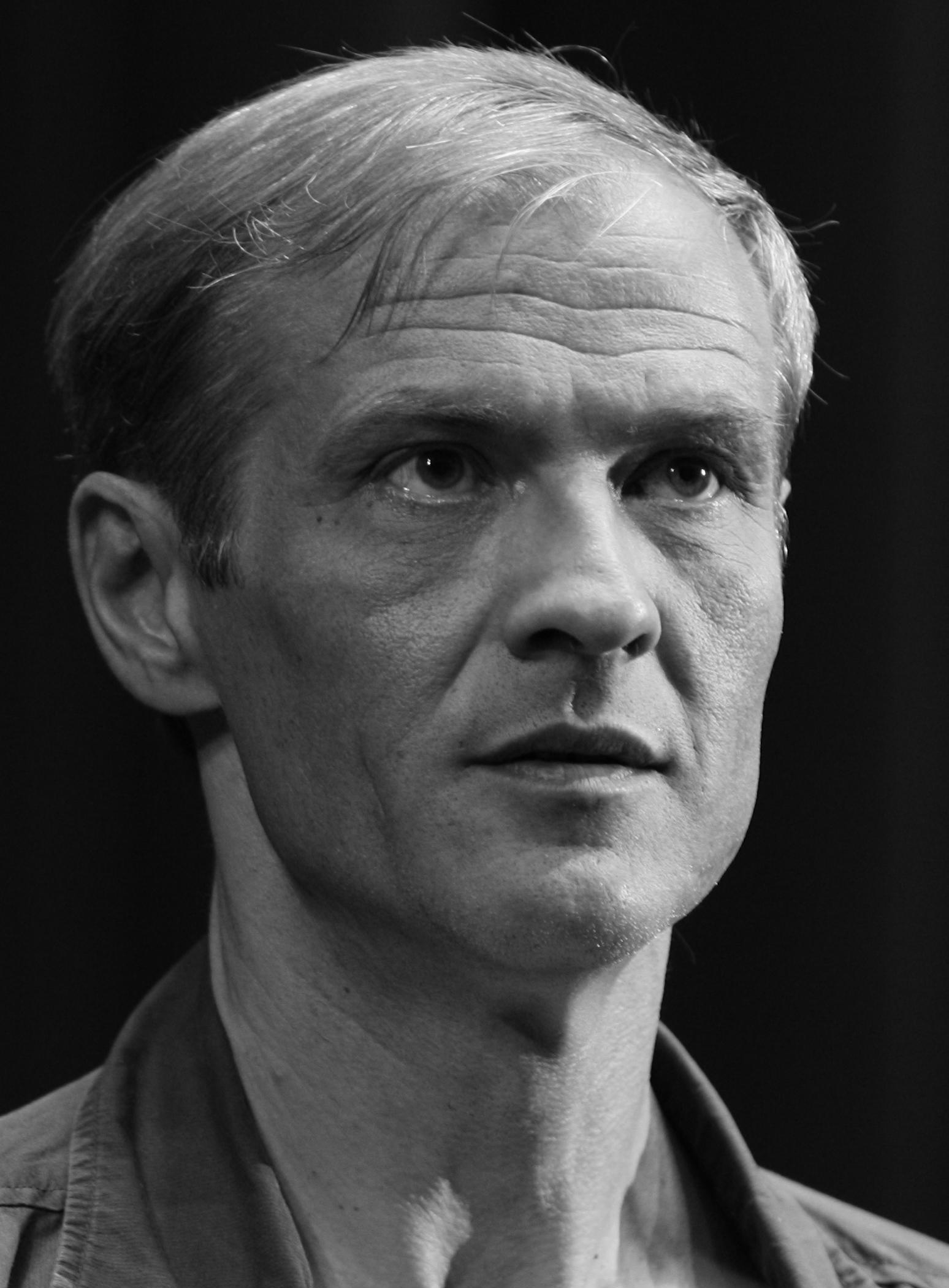
Roman Luknár has earned his nomination within drama.

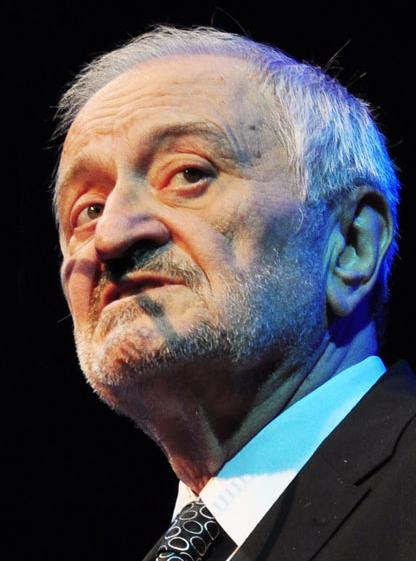
Milan Lasica, an OTO Hall of Fame-inductee, he has been nominated in addition.

Year	Recipient	Nominees
2000	★ Michal Dočolomanský (2 consecutive wins)	Maroš Kramár; Ladislav Chudík^{‡}
2001	★ Michal Dočolomanský (2 consecutive wins)	Miroslav Noga; Maroš Kramár
2002	★ Július Satinský (In Memoriam)	Maroš Kramár; Michal Dočolomanský
2003	★ Michal Dočolomanský	Maroš Kramár; Emil Horváth
2004	★ Maroš Kramár (2 consecutive wins)	Michal Dočolomanský; Janko Kroner
2005	★ Maroš Kramár (2 consecutive wins)	Michal Dočolomanský; Janko Kroner
2006	★ Janko Kroner	Maroš Kramár; Milan Lasica^{‡}
2007	★ Tomáš Maštalír (2 consecutive wins)	Maroš Kramár; Janko Kroner
2008	★ Tomáš Maštalír (2 consecutive wins)	Janko Kroner; Alexander Bárta
2009	★ Janko Kroner	Ľuboš Kostelný; Alexander Bárta

=== 2010s ===
Year	Recipient	Nominees
2010	Held only in genre	
2011	Held only in genre	
2012	★ Ján Koleník^{┼}	Juraj Kemka; Lukáš Latinák
2013	★ Lukáš Latinák	Ján Jackuliak; Tomáš Maštalír
2014	★ Juraj Kemka	Lukáš Latinák; Tomáš Maštalír
2015	★ Daniel Heriban	Ján Koleník; Michal Kubovčík
2016	★ Michal Hudák (2 consecutive wins)	Daniel Heriban; Ján Koleník
2017	★ Michal Hudák (2 consecutive wins)	Michal Kubovčík; Vladimír Kobielsky
2018	★ Vladimír Kobielsky	Tomáš Maštalír; Ján Koleník

== Superlatives ==
=== Multiple winners ===
3 awards

- Michal Dočolomanský
- Tomáš Maštalír

2 awards

- Maroš Kramár^{†}
- Janko Kroner
- Michal Hudák

=== Multiple nominees ===
8 nominations

- Maroš Kramár

6 nominations

- Michal Dočolomanský
- Tomáš Maštalír

5 nominations

- Janko Kroner

4 nominations

- Ján Koleník

3 nominations

- Lukáš Latinák^{┼†}

2 nominations

- Alexander Bárta
- Juraj Kemka
- Daniel Heriban
- Michal Kubovčík
- Michal Hudák
- Vladimír Kobielsky

Notes

^{┼} Denotes also a winner in two or more of the main categories.
^{†} Denotes also a winner of the Absolute OTO category.
^{‡} Denotes also an inductee into the Hall of Fame OTO.

== Associated categories ==
OTO Award
TV Male Actor – Drama

First awarded | Last awarded
2010 | 2011

=== TV Male Actor – Drama ===
Year	Recipient	Nominees
2010	★ Ján Koleník (2 consecutive wins)	Janko Kroner; Ľuboš Kostelný
2011	★ Ján Koleník (2 consecutive wins)	Roman Luknár; Janko Kroner

2 awards

- Ján Koleník

2 nominations

- Ján Koleník
- Janko Kroner

OTO Award
TV Male Actor – Comedy

First awarded | Last awarded
2010 | 2011

=== TV Male Actor – Comedy ===
Year	Recipient	Nominees
2010	★ Lukáš Latinák (2 consecutive wins)	Ľuboš Kostelný; Janko Kroner
2011	★ Lukáš Latinák (2 consecutive wins)	Ľuboš Kostelný; Alexander Bárta

2 awards

- Lukáš Latinák

2 nominations

- Lukáš Latinák
- Ľuboš Kostelný
