= DOSKY Awards =

Annual Slovak theatre awards

The DOSKY Awards are presented annually for achievements in Slovak theatre. The awards were founded in 1996. The winners are selected by vote by theatre critics. Recent winners in the principal categories have been as follows.

== Best Actress ==
1996 – Diana Mórová for Rosalind in As You Like It

1997 – Zuzana Kronerová for Mother in Mother

1998 – Zora Kolínska for Akulina in Scény z Domu Bessemenovcov - Meštiaci

1999 – Adela Gáborová for Lady Macbeth in Macbeth

2000 – Emília Vášáryová for The Old Woman in The Chairs

2001 – Anna Šišková for Celia in Večierok

2002 – Emília Vášáryová for Maria Callas in The Master Class

2003 – Anna Šišková for The Young Woman in Bash

2004 – Emília Vášáryová for Stevie in The Goat, or Who Is Sylvia?

2005 – Ingrid Timková for Kráľovná noci in Ignorant a šialenec

2006 – Táňa Pauhofová for Manon in Manon Lescaut

2007 – Zuzana Kanócz for Portia Coughlanová in Portia Coughlanová

2008 – Daniela Kuffelová for Matka in Matka

2009 – Jana Oľhová for Sara in Mobil

2010 – Edita Borsová for Beta in Máša a Beta

2011 – Szidi Tobias for Žena in Gazdova krv

2012 – Božidara Turzonovová for Natálie in Pohania

2013 – Anna Javorková for Clytemnestra in Oresteia

2014 – Zdena Studenková for Leni Riefenstahl in Leni

2015 – Dominika Kavaschová for Runa in Mojmír II. alebo Súmrak ríše

2016 – Petra Vajdová for Emilie Ekdahl in Fanny and Alexander

2017 – Lucia Korená for Anne Frank in Anne Frank

2018 – Barbora Andrešičová for Emma in People, Places and Things

2019 – Tatiana Poláková for Mary Stuart in Mary Stuart

2020 – not awarded due to the COVID-19 pandemic

2021 – not awarded due to the COVID-19 pandemic

2022 – Alena Pajtinková for Masha in Three Sisters

2023 – Lucia Jašková for Hekuba in Hekuba

2024 – Jana Oľhová for Bruscon in Der Theatermacher

== Best Actor ==
1996 – Ján Kožuch for Herec in ...príď kráľovstvo Tvoje

1997 – Martin Huba for Zhevakin in Marriage

1998 – Boris Farkaš for Tetrev in Scény z Domu Bessemenovcov

1999 – Marián Slovák for Tevye in Fiddler on the Roof

2000 – Boris Farkaš for Porfirij Petrovič in Vražda sekerou v Svätom Peterburgu

2001 – Vladimír Hajdu for Vikomt de Valmont in Kvartéto

2002 – Matej Landl for Larry in Bližšie od teba

2003 – Milan Lasica for Henri in Life x 3

2004 – Juraj Kukura for Martin in The Goat, or, Who is Sylvia?

2005 – Marián Labuda for Tiso in Tiso

2006 – Peter Šimun for Rudolf Höller in Pred odchodom na odpočinok

2007 – Martin Huba for Henrik in Popol a vášeň

2008 – Robert Roth for Hamlet in Hamlet

2009 – Jevgenij Libezňuk for Lopakhin in The Cherry Orchard

2010 – Robert Roth

2011 – Miroslav Noga for Gazdu in Gazdova krv

2012 – Dano Heriban for Ján in Sedem dní do pohrebu

2013 – Dano Heriban for Janek Kráľ in www.narodnycintorin.sk

2014 – Ľuboš Kostelný for Maximilián Aue in Láskavé bohyne

2015 – Tamás Gál for Zsolt Vidra in Spiatočka / Rükverc

2016 – Richard Stanke for Eduard Vergérus in Fanny a Alexander

2017 – Tomáš Mischura for Dávid in Deň, keď zomrel Gott

2018 – Martin Huba for Mathias Clausen in Before Sundown

2019 – Peter Brajerčík for Peter Brajerčík in Peter Brajerčík a Júlia Rázusová: Moral Insanity

2020 – not awarded due to the COVID-19 pandemic

2021 – not awarded due to the COVID-19 pandemic

2022 – Ľuboš Kostelný for Prince Hamlet in Hamlet

2023 – Marek Geišberg for Agamemnon in Hekuba

2024 – Ľuboš Kostelný for Mr. Charles in The New Century
