= Dorota Nvotová =

Slovak singer and actress (born 1982)

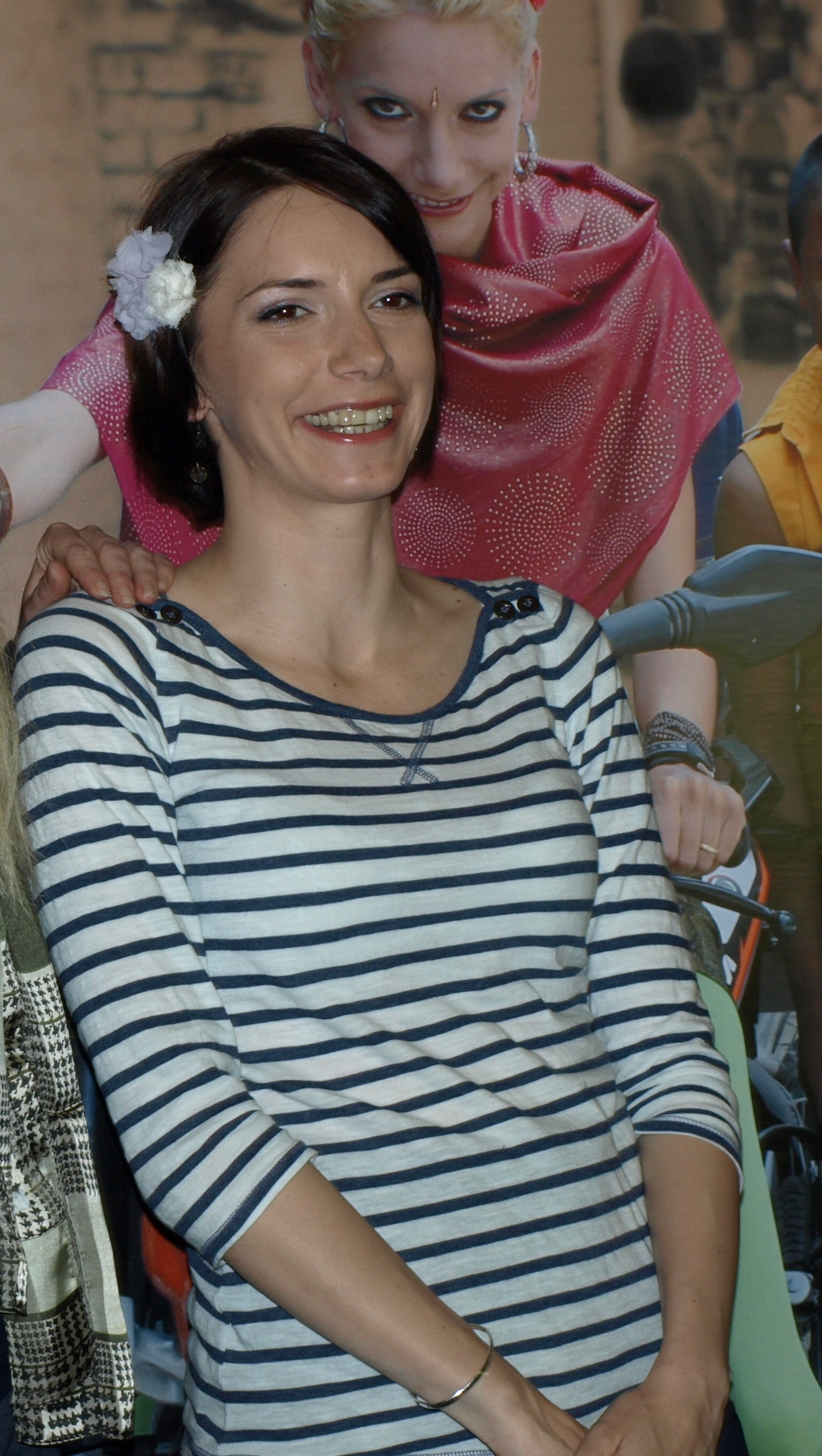
- Nvotová in 2013
- Born: 27 October 1982 (age 44); Považská Bystrica, Czechoslovakia
- Occupations: Singer; actress
- Musical career
- Genres: Rock; alternative rock
- Instruments: Vocals; piano; saxophone
- Labels: Universal Music; EMI Czech Republic
- Website: dorotanvotova.sk

Dorota Nvotová (born 27 October 1982 in Považská Bystrica, Czechoslovakia) is a Slovak singer, actress, and journalist for the newspaper .týždeň. She is a daughter of actress Anna Šišková and musician Jaroslav Filip. She currently lives alternately in Slovakia and Nepal, where she leads hiking expeditions for tourists.

== Filmography ==
- Orbis Pictus (1997) .... Terezka
- Krajinka (2000) .... Paula
- Děvčátko (2002) .... Ema
- Perníková věž (2002) .... Věra
- O Život (2008) .... Zita
- Muzika (2008) .... Anča Prepichová
- Il Caso dell'infedele Klara (2009) .... Sandra
- Mŕtvola musí zomrieť (2011) .... Lívia
- The Confidant (2011)

== Discography ==
- Overground (2002)
- Dorota Nvotová (2004)
- Sila vzlyku (2008)
- Just! (2012)
- More (2018)
- Ten (2021)
- Lazy (EP, 2025)

== Bibliography ==
- Fulmaya (2014)

== Political career ==
On June 7, 2023, she joined Democrats political party.
