= Anna Siskova =

Anna Siskova may refer to:

- Anna Šišková (born 1960), Slovak actress
- Anna Sisková (born 2001), Czech tennis player
