= OTO Award for TV Host =

OTO Award
TV Host

Currently held by
Adela Banášová

First awarded | Last awarded
2014 | Present

OTO Award for TV Host has been bestowed to the most recognized television host of the past year in Slovakia. As a newly established category of the awards show, the opening winner of the category will be announced live during the upcoming 15th OTO Awards ceremony to be held on March 14, 2015.

== Winners and nominees ==
=== 2010s ===
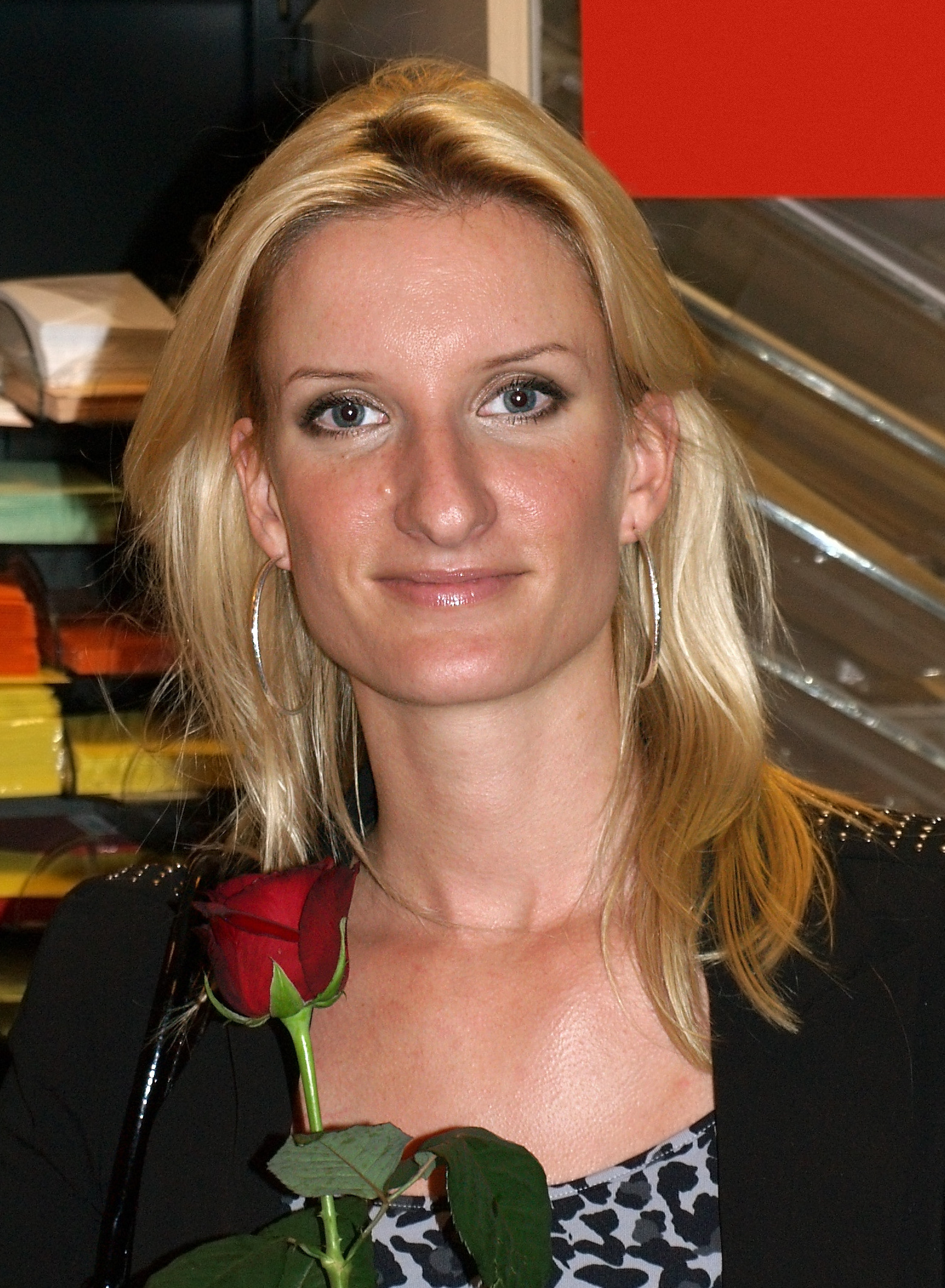
Adela Banášová

Year	Recipient	Nominees
2010	Not awarded	
2011	Not awarded	
2012	Not awarded	
2013	Not awarded	
2014	★ Adela Banášová (3 consecutive wins)	Andrej Bičan; Marcel Forgáč
2015	★ Adela Banášová (3 consecutive wins)	Marcel Forgáč; Milan Zimnýkoval
2016	★ Adela Banášová (3 consecutive wins)	Andrej Bičan; Marcel Forgáč

== Superlatives ==
=== Multiple winners ===
3 awards

- Adela Banášová

=== Multiple nominees ===
3 nominations

- Adela Banášová
- Marcel Forgáč

2 nominations

- Andrej Bičan
