= Ľudovít Kroner =

Slovak actor

- Born: 19 December 1925; Staškov, Czechoslovakia
- Died: 19 December 2000 (aged 75); Považská Bystrica, Slovakia
- Other names: Ludvík Króner (commonly misspelled)
- Occupation: Actor
- Years active: 1971–death
- Parents: Ľudovít Kroner (1891–1956); Mária (1894–1975)
- Relatives: Jozef; Ján (brothers) Zuzana Kronerová (niece)

Ľudovít Kroner (19 December 1925 – 19 December 2000) was a Slovak actor and one of the first generation members of the Kroner family. He was a younger brother of Jozef and older of Ján Kroner.

== See also ==
- List of Czechoslovak films
- List of people surnamed Kroner
