= Janko Kroner =

Slovak film, television and stage actor (born 1956)

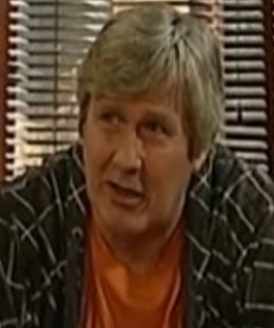
- Kroner as Miňo Demovič in Profesionáli series
- Born: Ján Kroner; 1 June 1956 (age 69); Považská Bystrica, ČSR
- Other names: Króner (commonly misspelled)
- Education: SPŠ, Považská Bystrica (1975)
- Alma mater: VŠMU, Bratislava (1982)
- Occupations: Actor; host; stage director
- Years active: 1975–present
- Employers: NS (1982–86); SND (1987–2009); MS STU (2010–11)
- Spouses: Adriana Kronerová; Lenka Košická (m. 2002–2014)
- Children: Jakub (1987); Paulína (2002)
- Parent: Ján Kroner
- Relatives: Jozef Kroner (paternal uncle); Zuzana Kronerová (cousin)
- Website: Slovak National Theater

Janko Kroner (born 1 June 1956) is a Slovak film, television and stage actor. Once a regular cast of the Slovak National Theater (SND) (1987–2009), Kroner began his acting career as part of the New Scene (1982–86). In the mid 1990s, alongside staging for his home theater, he gradually began appearing in a local VA-based ensemble called a.ha. In the most recent decade, he has been known as the frontman of the Malá scéna STU, a body supervised by Kroner through 2010-2011.

As a member of the Slovak acting "dynasty" that span three generations to date, Kroner himself has received numerous nominations in his native country, including two LitFond Awards for Performing Arts in Drama, as well two television-focused OTO Awards as TV Male Actor, respectively. Amongst others, he is the only son of Ján Kroner, or rather a nephew of Jozef Kroner.

== Filmography ==
I was a first-year student on elementary school in Považská Bystrica, when amateur actors came to our school to play The Salt Prince fairytale. My father played the King. He was very funny, I remember [that] all children would have a good laugh of him. So I'd wished for all the children to know [that] the King was my father. No one would believe me, though, and I felt too badly for that."

— Kroner on his first experience with acting, Webnoviny, 2010

Film

- 1982: The Emotional Education of a Daša (as Julo)
- 1984: The Brave Blacksmith (based on a Němcová's fairytale; as Matěj)
- 1984: Farewell, Sweet Slumbers
- 1986: The Edelstein Action (as Filo)
- 1986: Hothouse Venus (as Peter Vrchovský)
- 1986: Icing (as Igor Krška)
- 1987: The Devil's Smile (black-and-white; based on The Tales of Hoffmann, as Lt. Jurko)
- 1989: Sitting on a Branch, Enjoying Myself
- 1989: Nebojsa (based on a Pavol Dobšinský's fairytale; title r. as Ondrej "Nebojsa")
- 1991: Fly of the Asphalt Pigeon (voice r., as Dodo)
- 1996: Jašek's Dream (based on a Chrobák's story)
- 1997: Orbis Pictus
- 1997: Blue Heaven (voice r., as Viktor)
- 2000: Victims and Murderers (as Josef)
- 2002: Cruel Joys
- 2002: Quartétto (as Peter)
- 2007: Half-life (as Viktor)
- 2009: You Kiss like a God
- 2009: BRATISLAVAfilm (as Milanko)

== Awards ==
Chronological list of received awards and nominations
Year	Nominated work	Award	Category	Result
1995	Karate Billy in Return (by Pohl; title role)	LitFond Awards	Performing Arts in Drama – Male	Won
1997	Becket or The Honour of God (title role)	LitFond Awards	Performing Arts in Drama – SND	Shared^{┼}
1997	A Crazy Day (by Turrini; as Count Almaviva)	LitFond Awards	Performing Arts in Drama – SND	Shared^{┼}
2001	Himself (Various performances)	OTO Awards	TV Host – Children's Program	Nominated
2002	Himself (Various performances)	OTO Awards	TV Host – Children's Program	Nominated
2004	Himself (Various performances)	OTO Awards	TV Male Actor	Nominated
2005	Himself (Various performances)	OTO Awards	TV Male Actor	Nominated
2006	Himself (Various performances)	OTO Awards	TV Male Actor	Won
2007	Himself (Various performances)	OTO Awards	TV Male Actor	Nominated
2008	Himself (Various performances)	OTO Awards	TV Male Actor	Nominated
2009	Himself (Various performances)	OTO Awards	TV Male Actor	Won
2009	Marysha (as Lízal)	LitFond Awards	Performing Arts in Drama – SND	Shared^{┼}
2010	Himself (Various performances)	OTO Awards	TV Male Actor – Comedy	Nominated
2010	Himself (Various performances)	OTO Awards	TV Male Actor – Drama	Nominated
2011	Himself (Various performances)	OTO Awards	TV Male Actor – Drama	Nominated
^{┼} The LitFond Awards are usually bestowed to a larger numbers of VA per category.

== See also ==
- List of Slovak films
- List of people surnamed Kroner

== Sources ==
- "Ján Kroner > Stageography". Slovak National Theater (in Slovak). Slovenské národné divadlo. snd.sk.
- Renáta Šmatláková (ed.). "Ján Kroner > Filmography". Slovak Film Database (in English and Slovak). Slovak Film Institute. sfd.sfu.sk. Archived from the original on 25 February 2015.
- "Ján Kroner > Filmography". Czecho-Slovak Film Database (in Czech and Slovak). POMO Media Group. csfd.cz.
