= Daniela Kuffelová =

Slovak actress

- Born: 12 November 1965 (age 59); Trnava, Czechoslovakia
- Occupation: Actress
- Years active: 1993-present

Daniela Kuffelová (born 12 November 1965) is a Slovak actress. She is an actress best known for her roles in Chlap v dome (1986), Vsetko co mam rad (1993), and Jesenná (zato) silná láska (2003). At the 2008 DOSKY Awards she won in the category of Best Actress, for her performances in the play Matka. Kuffelová received a nomination in the same category in the 2016 awards, for her role as Karolin in the play Hamlet je mŕtvy at the Andrej Bagar Theatre, but the eventual winner was Petra Vajdová.
