= List of people with surname Kroner =

Kroner is a surname of German or Slavic origin.

Notable people with this name include:

- Erich Kroner – German sports journalist and Prussian construction officer; born ca. 1888, died 1937
- Erling Kroner – Danish jazz musician and composer; born 16 April, died 2 March 2011 in Kopenhagen
- Jakub Kroner – Slovak film director; born 1987 in Bratislava
- Ján Kroner, Sr. – Slovak actor; born 1 May 1927 in Brunovce, died 24 June 1986 in Považská Bystrica
- Ján Kroner, Jr. (also known as Janko Kroner) – Slovak actor; born 1 June 1956 in Považská Bystrica
- Jozef Kroner – Slovak actor; born 20 March 1924 in Staškov; died 12 March 1998 in Bratislava
- Karl Kroner – German physician and psychiatrist; born 1878 in Berlin, died 1937 in Island
- Kurt Kroner – German sculptor; born 23 October 1885 in Wrocław, died 10 May 1929 in Munich
- Ľudovít Kroner – Slovak actor; born 19 December 1925 Staškov; died 19 December 2000 in Považská Bystrica
- Paul Kroner – Jew persecuted during the Nazi era and active fellow of the German deaf culture-movement; born 9 June 1980 in Berlin, died 4 March 1943 in Auschwitz
- Richard Kroner – German neo-Hegelian philosopher; born 8 March 1884 in Wrocław, died 2 November 1974 in Mammern
- Tobias Kroner – German speedway-racer; born 16 October 1985 in Haselünne
- Zuzana Kronerová – Slovak actress; born 17 April 1952 in Martin, Slovakia
