= Peter Pišťanek =

Slovak writer (1960–2015)

- Born: 28 April 1960; Devínska Nová Ves, Bratislava, Czechoslovakia
- Died: 22 March 2015 (aged 54); Bratislava, Slovakia
- Occupation: Author
- Writing career
- Language: Slovak
- Notable work: Rivers of Babylon

Peter Pišťanek (28 April 1960 – 22 March 2015) was a Slovak writer. He began publishing short stories in the 1980s, and his first novel, Rivers of Babylon, came out in 1991. This was adapted into a film of the same name in 1998 by Vladimir Balco. The book was followed by the sequels Wooden Village (1994) and End of Freddy (1999). Two more of Pišťanek's works were adapted to film, both by Juraj Nvota: his short story "Muzika", which won Best Film at the Sun in a Net Awards in 2008, and his novel Rukojemník – Lokomotívy v daždi, in 2014. Pišťanek committed suicide on 22 March 2015.

== Life and career ==
In the 1980s, Pišťanek was a co-founder and drummer in the music group Devínska Nová Vec, named after the Bratislava borough where he was born in 1960. He also published stories in the magazine Slovenské pohľady. He briefly studied dramaturgy and screenwriting at VŠMU but did not finish his studies. Before publishing his first novel, Rivers of Babylon, in 1991, Pišťanek held a variety of jobs, including as a machinist in a Slovnaft oxygen factory, a parking lot attendant, in the advertising industry, and eventually in publishing. After the Velvet Revolution, he became editor-in-chief of the Tele-Video-Relax magazine, and from 1996, he was a web designer at Gratex International as well as editing the online magazine inZine.

=== Writing ===
Pišťanek published his first novel, Rivers of Babylon, in 1991 (an English edition came out in 2007, translated by Peter Petro). In 1998, it was adapted into a feature film of the same name by director Vladimir Balco, with music by Jaroslav Filip and a minor role by Pišťanek himself. It was followed in 1994 by the sequel Wooden Village, and in 1999, End of Freddy wrapped up the trilogy about Rácz, a village gangster who emerges in the fall of 1989 as communist rule is disintegrating in Czechoslovakia.

In 2007, Juraj Nvota adapted Pišťanek's short story "Muzika" into a film of the same name, which also included an appearance by the author. The production won Best Film at the Sun in a Net Awards that year.

In 2014, Pišťanek published the novel Rukojemník – Lokomotívy v daždi, which was again adapted by Nvota for the screen, with yet another cameo by the author.

Pišťanek was also an active writer about the alcoholic beverage industry, providing his insight and humour on both spirits and wines.

== Death ==
On 22 March 2015, Pišťanek committed suicide.

== Legacy ==
Pišťanek's 1999 collection of short stories, Sekerou a nožom, was included on the list of compulsory high school reading in Slovakia in September 2015. In 2016, the Bishops' Conference of Slovakia proposed to ban the book, due to what they termed to be "perverse language insulting human dignity". The Association of Catholic Schools of Slovakia, whose president at the time was current Minister of Education, Science, Research and Sport of Slovakia, Ján Horecký, put forward a request to withdraw the book from the compulsory reading list. 12,884 signatures were collected through an online petition, and the book was removed in September 2016.

== Publications ==
Novels

- Rivers of Babylon (1991); translated by Peter Petro, Garnett Press 11/2007, ISBN 978-0-9535878-4-1
- Rivers of Babylon 2, alebo Drevená dedina (1994); translated by Peter Petro as Wooden Village, Garnett Press 11/2008, ISBN 978-0-9535878-5-8
- Rivers of Babylon 3, alebo Fredyho koniec (1999); translated by Peter Petro as End of Freddy, Garnett Press 11/2009, ISBN 978-0-953-58786-5
- Neva (novella, 2014)
- Rukojemník – Lokomotívy v daždi (2014)

Collections

- Mladý Dônč (1993)
- Skazky o Vladovi pre veľkých a malých (1995)
- Nové skazky o Vladovi pre malých i veľkých (1998)
- Sekerou a nožom (with Dušan Taragel, 1999)
- Posledné skazky o Vladovi (2002)
- Pán Hronu – Z klenotnice slovenského obrodeného lyrizovaného sociálno – kritického realizmu (with Dušan Taragel, 2024)

Others

- Recepty z rodinného archívu – collection of fictionalized cooking recipes (2003)
- Traktoristi a buzeranti – collection of journalistic articles (2003)
- Živý oheň z vína – book about cognac (2006)

== Film adaptations ==
- Rivers of Babylon (1998)
- Music (2008)
- Rukojemník (2014)

== See also ==
- 9th ZAI Awards (Special Mention Award)
