= When the Stars Were Red =

1991 film

- Slovak: Keď hviezdy boli červené
- Directed by: Dušan Trančík
- Written by: Dušan Trančík; Eugen Gindl
- Produced by: Cédomir Kolar
- Starring: Václav Koubek
- Cinematography: Vladimír Smutný
- Edited by: Maros Cernák
- Release date: 1 September 1991 (Czechoslovakia)
- Running time: 87 minutes
- Country: Czechoslovakia
- Language: Slovak

When the Stars Were Red (Slovak: Keď hviezdy boli červené) is a 1991 Czech drama film directed by Dušan Trančík. It was entered into the 41st Berlin International Film Festival.

== Cast ==
- Václav Koubek as Josef Brezík
- Alena Ambrová as Heda
- Ján Sedal as Kadraba
- Jan Jasensky as Father Brezík
- Dezső Garas as Gróf Szentirmay
- Zuzana Kronerová as Beta
- Stanislav Harvan as Little Jozko
- Frantisek Vyrotsko as Viktor
- Miroslav Donutil as Dzurjanik
- Adela Gáborová as Slabejová
