= Norbert Bodnár =

Slovak composer

Norbert Bodnár (born 11 April 1956) is a Slovak composer.

== Biography ==
Bodnár was born in Košice and studied at the Košice Conservatory and the Academy of Performing Arts in Bratislava. Since 1982 he has taught at the Košice Conservatory; amongst his pupils was the composer Vladislav Šarišský.

His compositions include two symphonies (1989 and 1984), an opera Tartuffe after the play by Molière (1996, scenes arranged for soloists, choir and piano 2004), and theatre and film music.
