= Dušan Trančík =

Slovak film director

- Born: 26 November 1946 (age 79); Bratislava, Czechoslovakia (now in Slovakia)
- Occupations: Film director Screenwriter
- Years active: 1968-1991

Dušan Trančík (born 26 November 1946) is a Slovak film director and screenwriter. He directed 22 films between 1968 and 1993. His 1991 film When the Stars Were Red was entered into the 41st Berlin International Film Festival.

In 2012 he was granted funding for his next production The Donor.

== Selected filmography ==
- When the Stars Were Red (1991)
