= By the Waters of Babylon =

1937 post-apocalyptic short story by Stephen Vincent Benét

First page of the story with its original title in The Saturday Evening Post in 1937

"By the Waters of Babylon" is a post-apocalyptic short story by American writer Stephen Vincent Benét, first published July 31, 1937, in The Saturday Evening Post as "The Place of the Gods". It was included in his collection Thirteen O'Clock that same year and republished in 1943 The Pocket Book of Science Fiction, and was adapted in 1971 into a one-act play by Brainerd Duffield.

== Plot summary ==
Set in a future following the destruction of industrial civilization, the story is narrated by a young man named John who is the son of a priest. The priests of John's people (the Hill People) are inquisitive people associated with the divine. They are the only ones who can handle metal collected from the homes (called the "Dead Places") of long-dead people whom they believe to be gods. The plot follows John’s self-assigned mission to get to the Place of the Gods. His father allows him to go on a spiritual journey, not realizing John is going to this forbidden place.

John journeys through the forest for eight days and crosses the river Ou-dis-sun. Once John gets to the Place of the Gods, he feels the energy and magic there. He sees a statue of a "god"—in point of fact, a human—that says "ASHING" on its base. He also sees a building marked "UBTREAS". After being chased by dogs and climbing the stairs of a large building, John sees a dead god. Upon viewing the visage, he has an epiphany that the gods were humans whose power overwhelmed their good judgment. After John returns to his tribe, he tells his father of "the place newyork." His father warns him against recounting his experiences to others in the tribe, for sometimes too much truth is a bad thing, that it must be told little by little. The story ends with John stating his conviction that, once he becomes the head priest, "We must build again."

== Analysis ==
Benét wrote the story in response to the April 25, 1937 bombing of Guernica, in which Fascist military forces destroyed the majority of the Basque town of Guernica during the Spanish Civil War. This story was written before the creation of nuclear weapons, but Benét's description of "The Great Burning" is similar to later descriptions of the effects of the atomic bombings at Nagasaki and Hiroshima. His "deadly mist" and "fire falling from the sky" are eerily prescient of the descriptions of the aftermath of nuclear blasts. However, the "deadly mist" may also be a reference to chemical weapons in World War I, particularly mustard gas, a feared weapon of war that Benét's generation was very familiar with. The story was written in 1937, five years before the Manhattan Project started, and eight years before there was widespread public knowledge of the project.

== Influence on later work ==
Ayn Rand's 1937 novella Anthem may have been inspired by this story.

In 1955 Edgar Pangborn wrote "The Music Master of Babylon", a post-apocalyptic story told from the point of view of a pianist living alone in a ruined New York City, and after decades of total isolation encountering two youths from a new culture which had arisen in the world, who come exploring the ruined city. Pangborn depicted a different world than that of Benét, but referred to Benét's story in the title and in many of the story's details. Pangborn returned to that devastated world in his later writings, including the novel Davy.

== See also ==
- Anthem (novella)
- List of apocalyptic and post-apocalyptic fiction
- The title is a reference to Psalm 137 in the Bible.
- Rivers of Babylon (disambiguation)

== Sources ==
- Benét, Stephen Vincent (July 31, 1937). "THE PLACE OF THE GODS". Saturday Evening Post. 210 (5). Henry C. Pitz (illus.): 10–11, 59–60 (4p).
- Benét, Stephen Vincent (1971) [1937]. Thirteen O'Clock: Stories of Several Worlds. Ayer Co Pub. ISBN 0-8369-3793-7.
- Duffield, Brainerd; Stephen Vincent Benét (1971). Stephen Vincent Benet's By the waters of Babylon; a play in one act. Chicago: Dramatic Pub. Co.(WorldCat) (preview)
- Fenton, Charles A. (1978) [1958]. Stephen Vincent Benet: The Life and Times of an American Man of Letters, 1898-1943. Westport, Conn.: Greenwood Press. ISBN 0-313-20200-1.
- Izzo, David Garrett. "Stephen Vincent Benét (1898-1943)". The Literary Encyclopedia. (about the author)
- Macdonald, Andrew, Gina Macdonald, and MaryAnn Sheridan. (2000). Shape-shifting: images of Native Americans in recent popular fiction. Contributions to the study of popular culture, no. 71. Westport, Conn, Greenwood Press. ISBN 0-313-30842-X.
- Wagar, W. Warren (1982). Terminal Visions: The Literature of Last Things. Bloomington: Indiana University Press. ISBN 0-253-35847-7.
