= Román pro ženy =

- Directed by: Filip Renč
- Written by: Michal Viewegh; Alice Nellis
- Produced by: Petr Chajda; Tomáš Hoffman; Petr Zempliner; Ondřej Zach
- Starring: Zuzana Kanócz; Marek Vašut; Simona Stašová
- Cinematography: Petr Hojda
- Edited by: Jan Mattlach
- Music by: Jérôme Degey; Eric Capone; Michel Eli; Arno Elias
- Distributed by: Bioscop
- Release date: 2005
- Running time: 95 minutes
- Country: Czech Republic
- Language: Czech
- Budget: 30,000,000 CZK
- Box office: 52,537,563 CZK

Román pro ženy is a Czech comedy film based on the 2001 novel of the same name by Michal Viewegh. It was released in 2005. The Czech title means "A Novel for Women" but the film is known in English as From Subway With Love.

== Cast ==
- Zuzana Kanócz as Laura
- Marek Vašut as Oliver
- Simona Stašová as Jana
- Stella Zázvorková as Granny
- Miroslav Donutil as Zemla
- Laďka Něrgešová as Ingrid
- Jaromír Nosek as Rickie
- Klára Sedláčková as Sandra
- Jaromír Dulava as Laura's father
- Peter Smith as Jeff
- David Švehlík as Hubert
- Saša Rašilov as Parachutist
- Juraj Ďurdiak as German Hans
- Viera Kučerová as 1st Hair-dresser
- Alena Vitáčková as 2nd Hair-dresser
