= The First Republic =

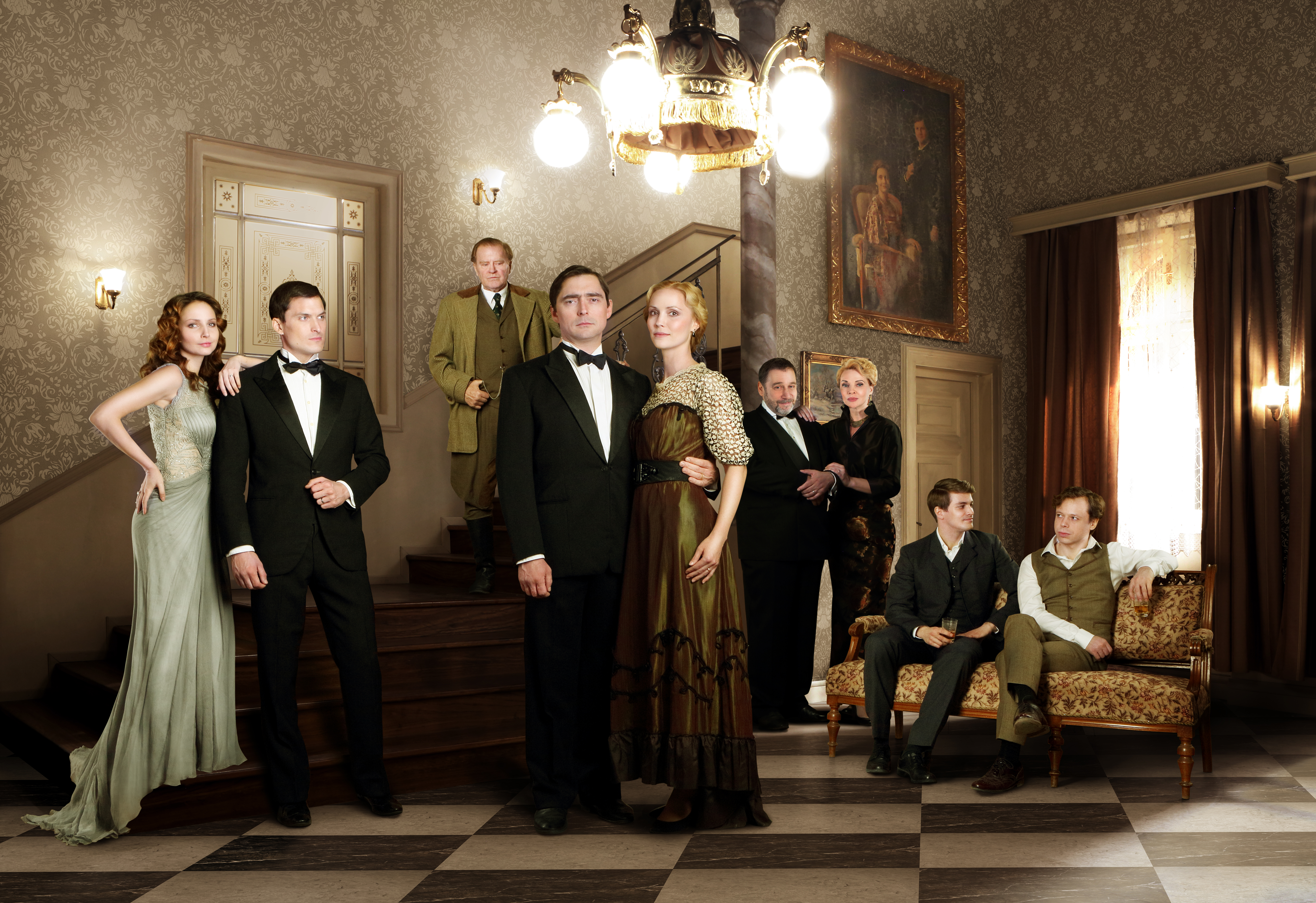
- Genre: Historical, Drama
- Directed by: Biser Arichtev; Johana Steiger Antošová
- Starring: Ján Koleník, Markéta Plánková, Jiří Vyorálek, Jan Vlasák, Veronika Arichteva
- Country of origin: Czech Republic
- Original language: Czech
- No. of seasons: 3
- No. of episodes: 48

Production
- Running time: 52 minutes

Original release
- Network: Czech Television
- Release: 2014 – 2018

The First Republic (Czech: První republika, also known as The Manor House) is a Czech historical television series. It was co-produced by Dramedy Productions and Česká Television, it maps the lives of the business Valenta family in the period from the establishment of the First Republic to the beginning of the 1930s. It was originally planned that the plot would last until 1945 but the series was cancelled after 3 seasons. The series was developed and offered for television by the production company Dramedy Productions. It was directed by Biser A. Arichtev, who previously worked with Dramedy on the series Vyprávěj, which was also conceived and produced for ČT by the Dramedy team.

== About series ==
The series consists of three seasons. The first season was broadcast on the ČT1 channel from January 17 to June 13, 2014, and had 22 episodes. The second season of the series had 13 episodes and was broadcast on ČT from September 8 to December 1, 2017. The plot of the second series takes place in 1928. The last series was completed in June 2018, [1] it also had 13 episodes and was broadcast on ČT between September 7 and November 30, 2018. The plot takes place between autumn 1930 and summer 1931. This is therefore a time of economic crisis and deepening national tensions between the Czech and German populations (the Sokol physical education associations and the German gymnastic association), and there is also an affair with poisoned alcohol.

The series tells the story of Valenta family in the period from 1918 to the beginning of the 1930s. The family became rich thanks to wartime contracts which allowed it to move from the countryside to Prague. In the family, there is a strained relationship between the brothers, a secret that is still kept secret, concerning the investigation of a murder that happened before the war. However, the story is complemented by tangled love relationships. The destinies of heroes are intertwined with the events of that time, which are intended to remind of the milestones of Czechoslovak history.

== Cast ==
- Jan Vlasák as Alois Valenta
- Jana Štěpánková as Hedvika Valentová (Season 1)
- Markéta Plánková as Klára Valentová-Léblová (Season 1 and 2)
- Jiří Vyorálek as Jaroslav Valenta
- Veronika Arichteva as Magdalena Škvorová/Valentová
- Ján Koleník as Vladimír Valenta
- Pavel Kříž as JUDr. Richard Benoni (Season 1)
- Taťjana Medvecká as housemaid Antonie
- Robert Urban as JUDr. Freddy Valenta
- Viktor Dvořák as Kryštof Lébl
- Svatopluk Skopal as inspector Mlčoch
- Tomáš Töpfer as Karel Škvor
- Kristýna Boková as Marie Kloudová (Season 2 and 3)
- Brigita Cmuntová as Eliška Valentová (Season 2 and 3)
- Anna Fialová as Irena Valentová (Season 2)
- Bořek Joura as Vojta Toufar (Season 2)
- Pavel Batěk as Martin Klouda (Season 2)
- Vladimír T. Gottwald as Zdeněk Král (Season 2)
- Vladimír Polívka as Jan Andrle (Season 2 and 3)
- Stanislav Majer as Hans von Lippi (Season 2 and 3)
- Katarína Šafaříková as Irena von Lippi, née Valentová (Season 3)
- Adam Mišík as Kilián Tůma (Season 3)
- Jan Hrušinský as Jakub Lébl

== Episodes ==
Season	Episodes	Originally aired	
Season	Episodes	First aired	Last aired
1	22	17 January 2014	13 June 2014
2	13	8 September 2017	1 December 2017
3	13	7 September 2018	30 November 2018
