= Music (2008 film) =

- Slovak: Muzika
- Directed by: Juraj Nvota
- Written by: Ondrej Šulaj
- Starring: Ľuboš Kostelný; Tatiana Pauhofová; Dorota Nvotová; Jan Budař
- Cinematography: Alexander Šurkala
- Music by: Robert Mankovecký
- Release date: 17 April 2008
- Running time: 99 minutes
- Countries: Slovakia; Germany
- Language: Slovak

Music (Slovak: Muzika) is a 2008 drama film directed by Juraj Nvota, written by Ondrej Šulaj and starring Ľuboš Kostelný, Tatiana Pauhofová, Dorota Nvotová and Jan Budař. At the 2008 ceremony for the Sun in a Net Awards, the film won in nine categories, including Best Film.

== Cast ==
- Ľuboš Kostelný as Martin
- Tatiana Pauhofová as Maria
- Dorota Nvotová as Anca Prepichová
- Jan Budař as Hruskovic
- Marek Geišberg as Zofré
- Marián Geišberg as Father-in-law
- Jana Oľhová as Mother-in-law
- Petra Polnišová as Milada
- Karol Spišák
- Csongor Kassai as Janota
- Martin Trnavský as Foreman
- Lujza Garajová Schrameková as Secretary
- Kamil Mikulčík as Elektrician
- Vladimír Hajdu as Prokopec
- Peter Pišťanek as Politruk
- Ronnie Šandorová Traubnerová as Committee member
- Ján Lehotský as Door-keeper
- Lukáš Latinák as Japonec
- Milan Ondrík as Fcela
- Marian Marko as Kamil
