= Kruté radosti =

- Directed by: Juraj Nvota
- Written by: Scarlett Čanakyová; Juraj Nvota
- Produced by: Marian Urban
- Starring: Tatiana Pauhofová; Ondřej Vetchý; Lukáš Latinák
- Cinematography: Jan Malíř
- Edited by: Alois Fišárek
- Music by: Ľubica Salamon-Čekovská
- Distributed by: Falcon
- Release dates: October 3, 2002 (Slovakia); March 13, 2003 (Czech Republic)
- Running time: 104 minutes
- Countries: Slovakia, Czech Republic
- Languages: Slovak, Czech

Kruté radosti ("Cruel Joys") is a 2002 Slovak-Czech comedy, starring Tatiana Pauhofová. The film directed by Juraj Nvota received several awards. Amongst others, at Art Film Fest, Festival of Slovak Film Cran-Gevrier, while Ondřej Vetchý earned an award as the Best Male Actor at the IFF Faces of Love in Moscow, Russia.

== Cast ==
- Tatiana Pauhofová as Valentína
- Ondřej Vetchý as Karel
- Lukáš Latinák
- Vladimír Hajdu as Gabriel
- Csongor Kassai as Lajoš
- Milan Mikulčík as Martin
- Anna Šišková as Helena
- Július Satinský as Helena's uncle
- Szidi Tobias as Ilona
- Zuzana Kanócz
- Anikó Vargová
- Attila Mokos
- Emília Došeková
- František Zvarík
- Ján Kroner
- Lucia Gažiová
- Martin Nahálka
- Milan Ondrík
- Zuzana Haasová

=== Additional credits ===
- Ondrej Trojan - co-producer
- Jana Garajová - assistant director
- Radim Hladík Jr - sound
- Martin Hub - stunts
- Filip Majer - assistant camera
- Peter Čanecký - art director
- Mona Hafsahl - costume designer

== Awards ==
Year	Nomination	Award(s)	Category	Result
2003	Juraj Nvota	Karlovy Vary IFF	Crystal Globe	Nominated
2003	Juraj Nvota	IGRIC Award	Best Director - Debut	Won
2003	Kruté radosti	Molodist IFF	Best Full-Length Fiction Film	Nominated
2003	Kruté radosti	Art Film Fest	Best Feature Film	Won
2003	Kruté radosti	FSF Cran-Gevrier	Audience Award	Won
2004	Ondřej Vetchý	IFF Faces of Love Moscow	Best Male Actor	Won
2004	Anna Šišková	Czech Lions	Best Supporting Actress	Nominated
2004	Alois Fišárek	Czech Lions	Best Editing	Nominated

== See also ==
- List of Slovak submissions for the Academy Award for Best Foreign Language Film
