= Park One =

Coordinates: 48.1501°N 17.1120°E

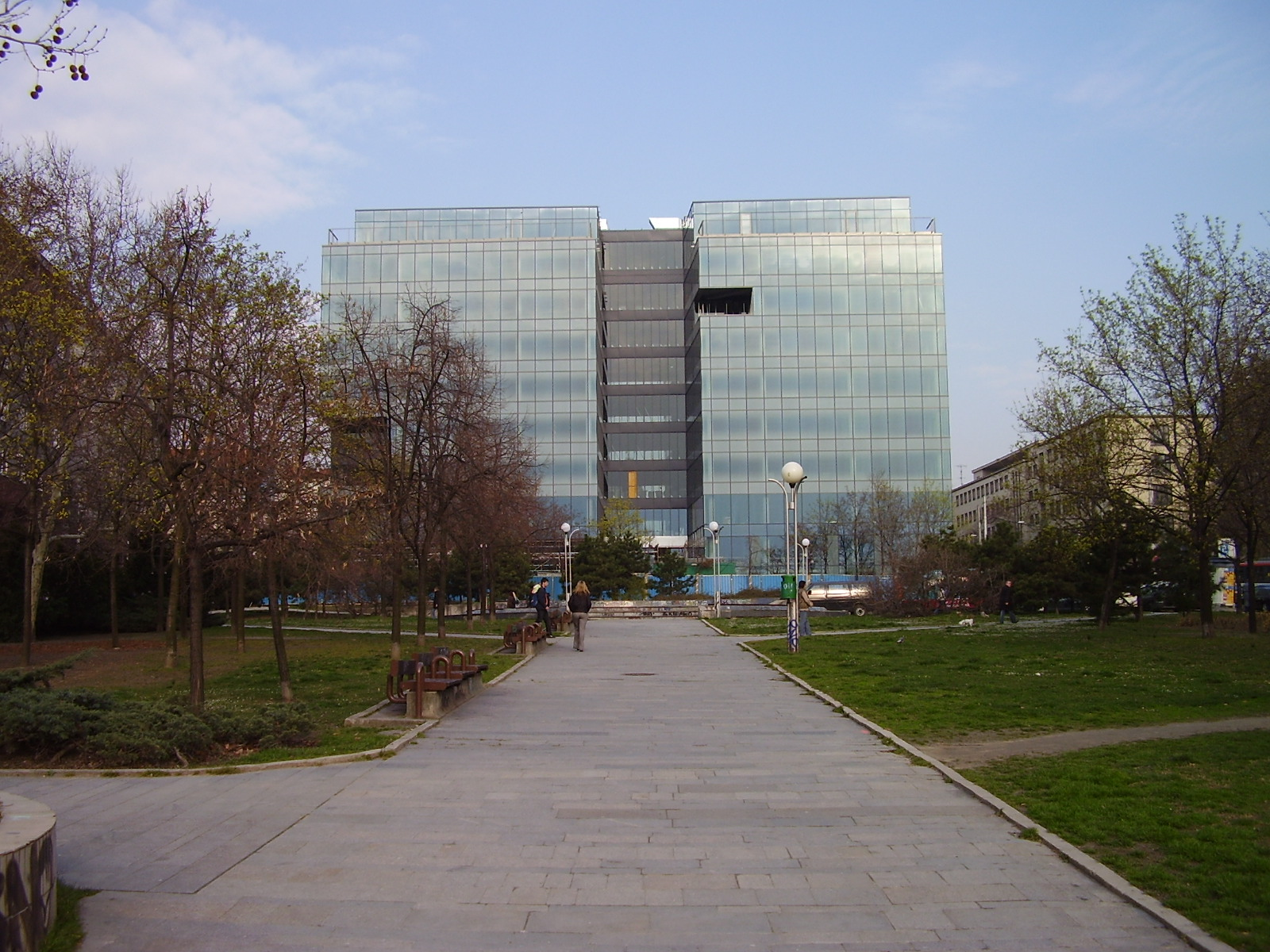
Park One during construction in 2007

Park One is an office building at Kollárovo Square in Bratislava, capital of Slovakia, across the street from the New Scene Theatre. The building contains offices at the upper floors and shops and a restaurant at the ground floor.

== History ==
Construction of the building started in 2005. It was constructed at the upper part of the park at Kollárovo Square, reducing its size and irreversibly changing the disposition of the square. The area, where Park One stands used to contain greenery, benches and a public transport stop.

== See also ==
- New Scene
