= Adela Gáborová =

Slovak actress (1940–2007)

- Born: 2 March 1940; Brekov, Slovakia
- Died: 12 July 2007 (aged 67); Nitra, Slovakia
- Occupation: Actress
- Years active: 1969–2007

Adela Gáborová (2 March 1940 – 12 July 2007) was a Slovak actress. She was associated with the Andrej Bagar Theatre for 44 years. Gáborová won in the category of Best Actress at the 1999 DOSKY Awards, for her performances as Lady Macbeth in the play Macbeth. She died after a long illness at the age of 67 in 2007.

== Selected filmography ==
- When the Stars Were Red (1991)
