= Jakub Kroner =

Slovak filmmaker (born 1987)

- Born: 1987 (age 37–38); Czechoslovakia
- Education: Animation
- Alma mater: Academy of Performing Arts
- Occupations: Actor; director; animator; writer; editor; camera operator
- Years active: 1997–present
- Parents: Janko Kroner; Adriana Kronerová
- Relatives: Paulína Kronerová (half sister); Jozef Kroner (grandfather); Zuzana Kronerová (paternal aunt)

Jakub Kroner (born 1987) is a Slovak filmmaker. His second feature film, Lóve (2011), became the box office number-one Slovak-language film of the year in his home country, while ranked the third highest-grossing ever since the independent Slovakia. As the youngest generation member of the Kroner acting family, he is the son of Janko Kroner.

== Filmography ==
As director

- 2006: Čo nás spája (short film)
- 2009: BRATISLAVAfilm (also screenwriter, editor, camera operator and actor; as Maťo)
- 2009: Hvezdár (short animated film; also screenwriter, animator)
- 2011: Lóve (also screenwriter)
- 2011: Lokal TV (TV animated series; also screenwriter, voice actor)
- 2015: LokalFilmis
- 2019: Šťastný nový rok
- 2021: Šťastný nový rok 2
- 2022: Šťastný nový rok 3
- 2023: Šťastný nový rok 4
- 2024: Šťastný nový rok 5 (in production)
- 2024: "MIKI"
- 2025: "ČERNÁK"

As actor-only

- 1997: Amálka, ja sa zbláznim! (TV film)

== See also ==
- List of Slovak films
- List of people surnamed Kroner

== Sources ==
- Renáta Šmatláková (ed.). "Jakub Kroner > Filmography". Slovak Film Database (in English and Slovak). Slovak Film Institute. sfd.sfu.sk. Archived from the original on April 2, 2015.
- "Jakub Kroner > Filmography". Czecho-Slovak Film Database (in Czech and Slovak). POMO Media Group. csfd.cz.
