= Rivers of Babylon (film) =

1998 Slovak comedy film

- Directed by: Vlado Balco
- Written by: Vlado Balco; Marian Urban; Peter Pišťanek (novel Rivers of Babylon)
- Starring: Andrej Hryc
- Cinematography: Martin Štrba
- Release date: 23 April 1998
- Running time: 102 minutes
- Country: Slovakia
- Language: Slovak

Rivers of Babylon is a 1998 Slovak comedy film directed by Vlado Balco. The film was selected as the Slovak entry for the Best Foreign Language Film at the 71st Academy Awards, but was not accepted as a nominee. The film is based on the 1991 novel of the same name by Peter Pišťanek.

== Cast ==
- Andrej Hryc as Rácz
- Vladimír Hajdu as Video-Urban (as Ady Hajdu)
- Diana Mórová as Silvia
- Barbora Kodetová as Lenka (as Barbara Kodetová)
- Miro Noga as Driver Dula
- Lubo Gregor as Riaditel

== See also ==
- List of submissions to the 71st Academy Awards for Best Foreign Language Film
- List of Slovak submissions for the Academy Award for Best Foreign Language Film
- Rivers of Babylon (novel)
