= Týždeň =

Slovak magazine

- Editor-in-Chief: Štefan Hríb
- Categories: News magazine
- Frequency: Weekly
- Publisher: W Press
- First issue: 2004; 22 years ago
- Country: Slovakia
- Based in: Bratislava
- Language: Slovak
- Website: http://www.tyzden.sk/

Týždeň (lit. 'Week', stylized as .týždeň) is a weekly Slovak news magazine based in Bratislava, Slovakia.

== History ==
Týždeň was first issued in December 2004. Published weekly by W Press S.A., the magazine focuses on topics relating to society, politics, and culture. It offers the same views on events as Denník N, with whom Týždeň also offer a joint subscription. Vladimir Čečetka and Ladislav Rehak have been major shareholders of W Press since its 2004 inception. At the end of 2007, Štefan Meszlényi from Komárňanské tlačiarní and Rudolf Zajac joined the publishing house. In 2011, lawyer Roman Kvasnica bought the latter's share.

The magazine also deals with investigative journalism – the state of the judiciary and the prosecutor's office along with long-term cases such as Hedviga Malinová case, murder of Ľudmila Cervanová, or the investigation of Gorilla case. After the discussion show Pod lampou with Hríb on RTVS, Týždeň was published online on its website.

In 2015, some editors left to work with Postoj Media and started publishing the new conservative newspaper Postoj; one of them included long-time investigative editor Marek Vagovič.
