= Petra Vajdová =

Slovak actress

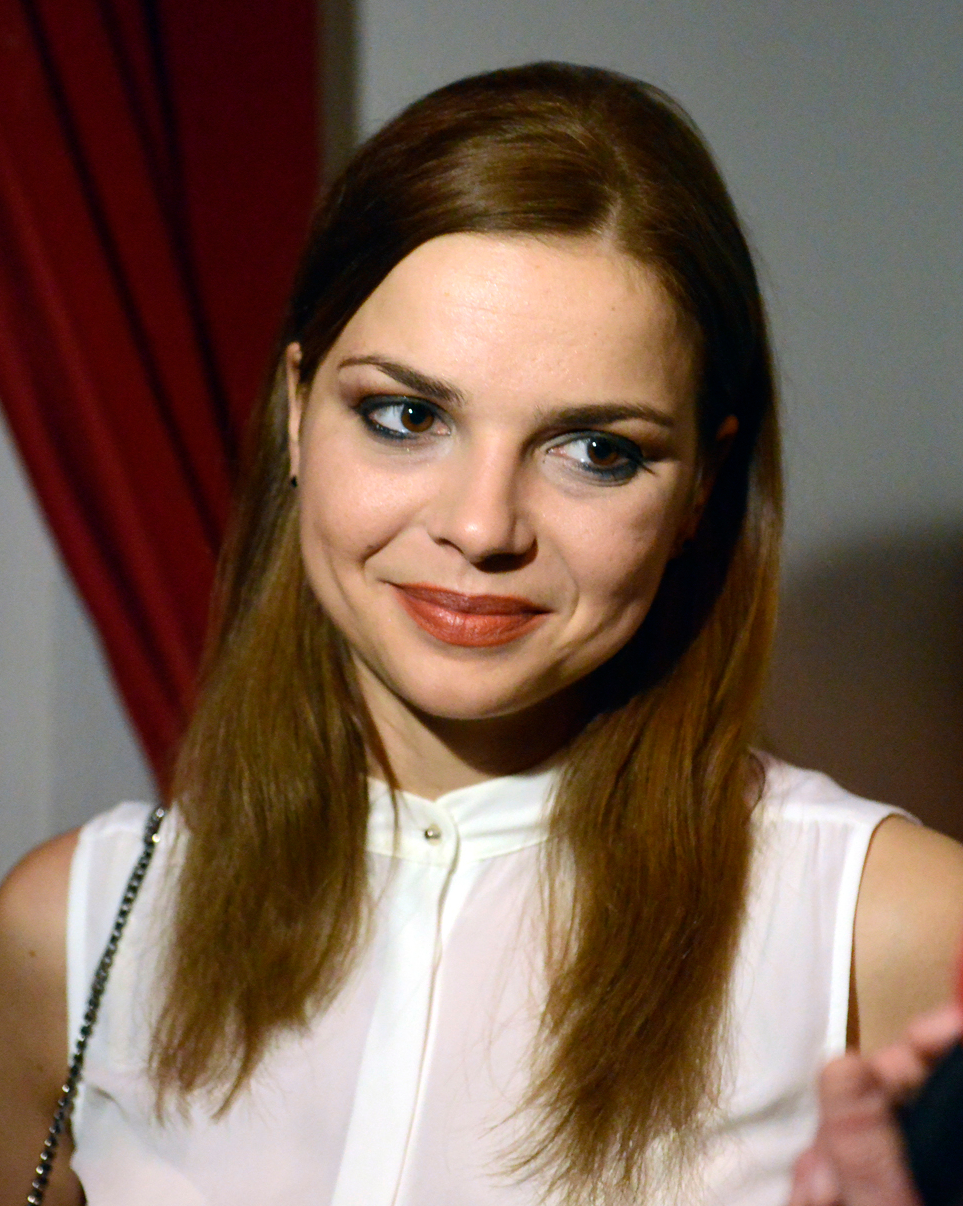
- Vajdová in 2015
- Born: 29 April 1985 (age 39); Martin, Czechoslovakia (now Slovakia)
- Occupation: Actress
- Years active: 2002–present

Petra Vajdová (born 29 April 1985) is a Slovak actress. At the 2016 DOSKY Awards she won in the category of Best Actress, for her performances in the play Fanny a Alexander at the Slovak National Theater. In 2017 Vajdová took part in the Markíza series Let's Dance, but withdrew in October after sustaining an injury to her leg.

== Selected filmography ==
- Búrlivé víno (television, 2012)
- Hostage (2014)
