= Rivers of Babylon (novel) =

1991 novel by Peter Pišťanek

- First edition (Slovak)
- Author: Peter Pišťanek
- Translator: Peter Petro
- Language: Slovak
- Genre: Thriller
- Publisher: Archa; Garnett Press
- Publication date: 1991
- Publication place: Czechoslovakia
- English publication date: 2007
- Media type: Print
- Pages: 259
- ISBN: 978-0-9535878-4-1
- OCLC: 180496688
- LC Class: PG5439.26.I77 R5813 2007
- Followed by: Mladý Dônč

Rivers of Babylon is a 1991 thriller novel by Slovak author Peter Pišťanek.

== Synopsis ==
The plot focuses on the criminal underworld of Bratislava, around the time of the Velvet Revolution. The characters—a collection of pimps, prostitutes, and swindlers—are all seeking a better life, which in their respective worlds means to deceive, exploit, and destroy everyone around them. A villager, Rácz, is gradually caught up in this world of greed, money, and desire for power.

== Film adaptation ==
A film of the same name, directed by Vladimir Balco and produced by Marian Urban, was released in 1998. Jaroslav Filip composed the soundtrack.

== See also ==
- Literature in Slovakia
