= Vladislav Šarišský =

Slovak composer

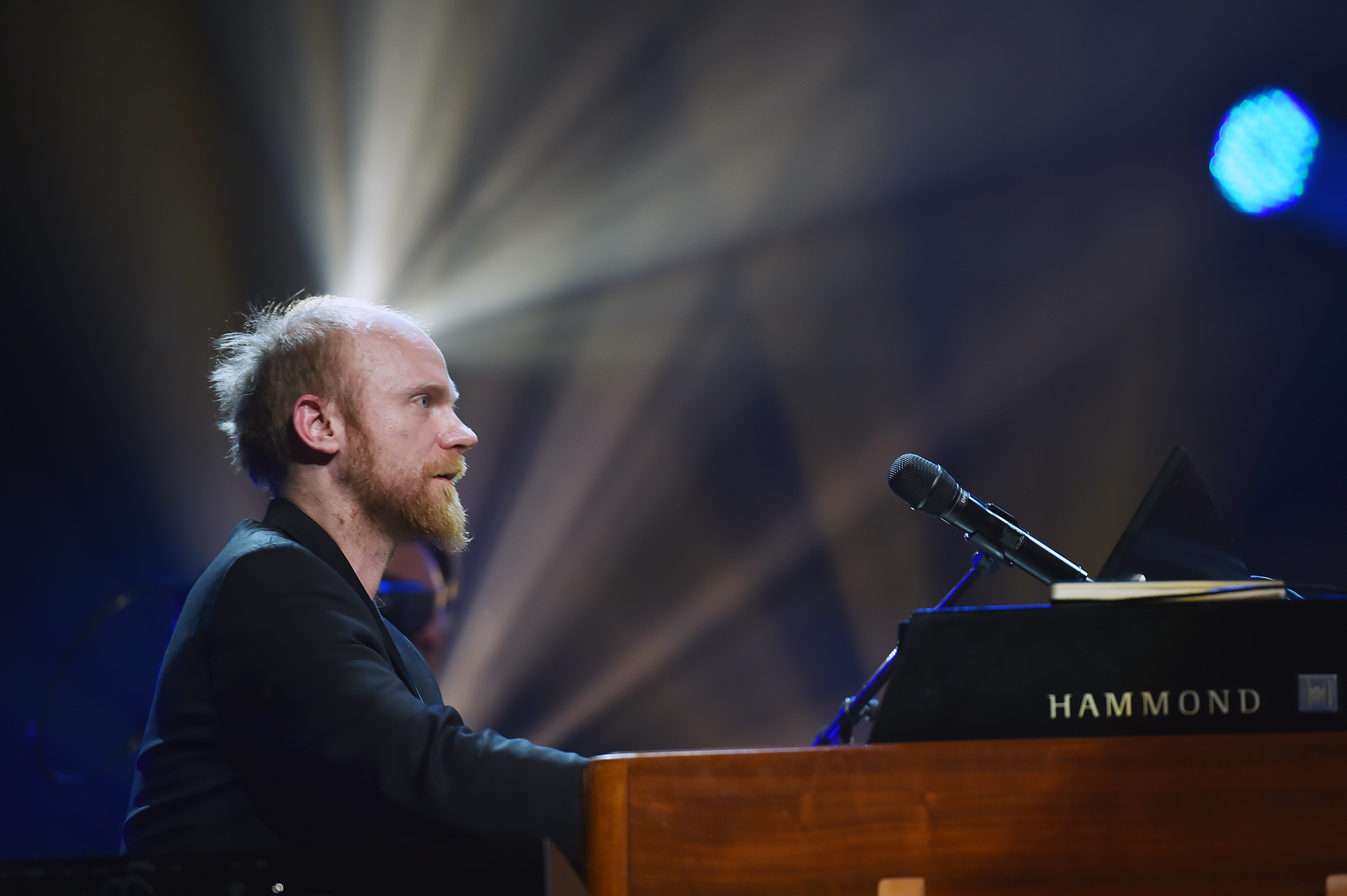
- Vladislav Šarišský performing in 2017

Background information
- Born: September 25, 1984 (age 41); Košice, Slovakia
- Occupations: composer; keyboardist
- Years active: 1999–present

Vladislav Šarišský (born 25 September 1984 in Košice) is a Slovak composer.

Šarišský studied at the conservatoire in Košice from 1999 to 2004, where his teachers included Norbert Bodnár. He later studied with Evgeni Irshai. In 2012 he was a Laureate of the Sergei Prokofiev International Composers' Competition in St. Petersburg for his flute concerto, EFieL.

His compositions include chamber music and orchestral music. Amongst his works are a piano concerto (DOR, 2003) and four string quartets.
