= Ján Koleník =

Slovak actor (born 1979)

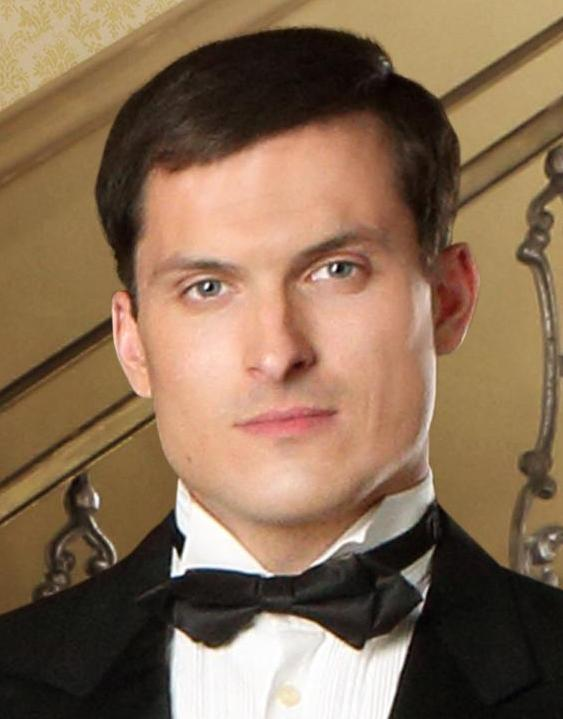
- Koleník in 2014
- Born: 11 November 1979 (age 45); Banská Bystrica, Slovakia
- Occupation: Actor
- Years active: 2005–present

Ján Koleník (born 11 November 1979) is a Slovak actor. He won the OTO Award for TV Male Actor for three consecutive years between 2010 and 2012. Koleník joined the Slovak National Theatre in 2004. He achieved fame in the Czech Republic for his role in the historical drama The First Republic.

== Selected filmography ==
- Panelák (television, 2008–2014)
- Kriminálka Staré Město (television, 2010)
- The First Republic (television, 2014–2018)
- Oteckovia (television, 2018–2022)
