= Korben Dallas (band) =

Slovak rock band

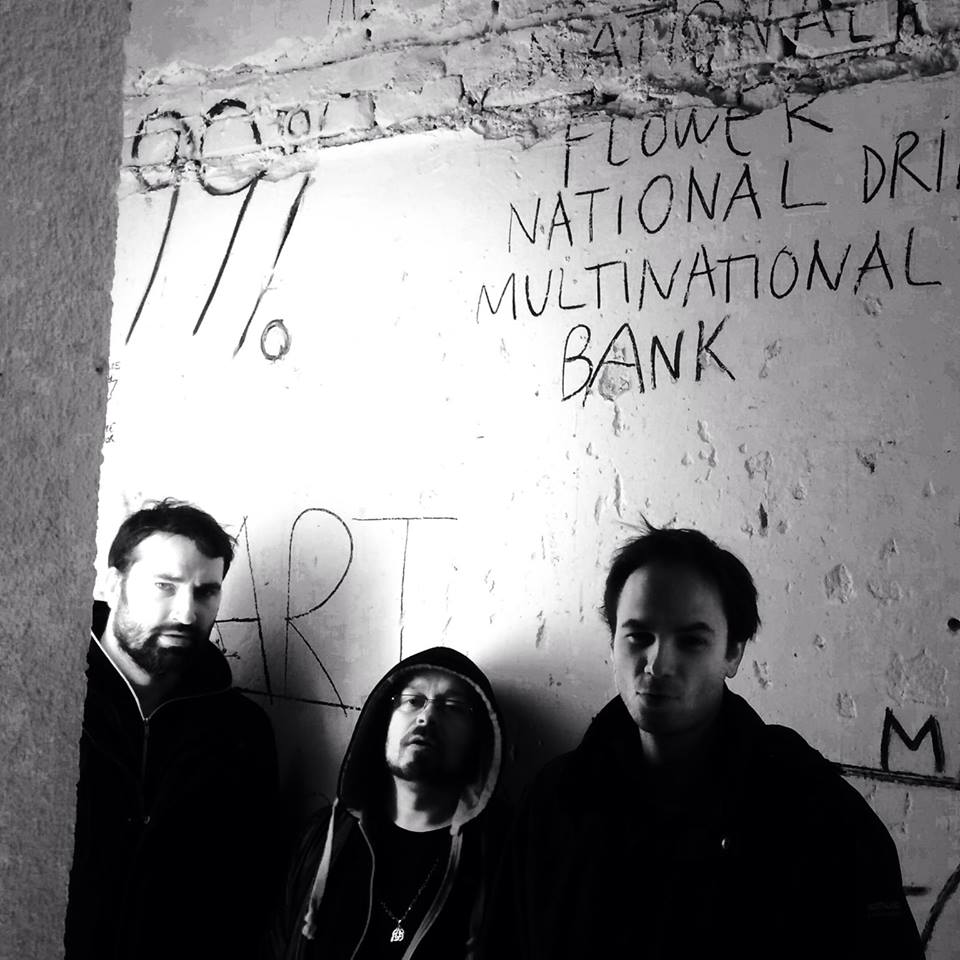

Background information
- Origin: Bratislava
- Genres: Rock
- Years active: 2010–present
- Members: Juraj Benetin; Ozo Guttler; Lukáš Fila

Korben Dallas is a Slovak rock band from Bratislava formed in 2010 by musicians who had previously played together in the art rock band called Appendix. During its existence, the band has so far released 7 albums. The band gained popularity in 2013 with their hit song Otec ("Father"). The band regularly performs at Slovak and Czech music festivals (Pohoda, Grape, Topfest, Colours of Ostrava). In 2011, the group released their debut album Pekné cesty. The album originated from a concert live recording and was nominated as an album of the year at Radio Head Awards.

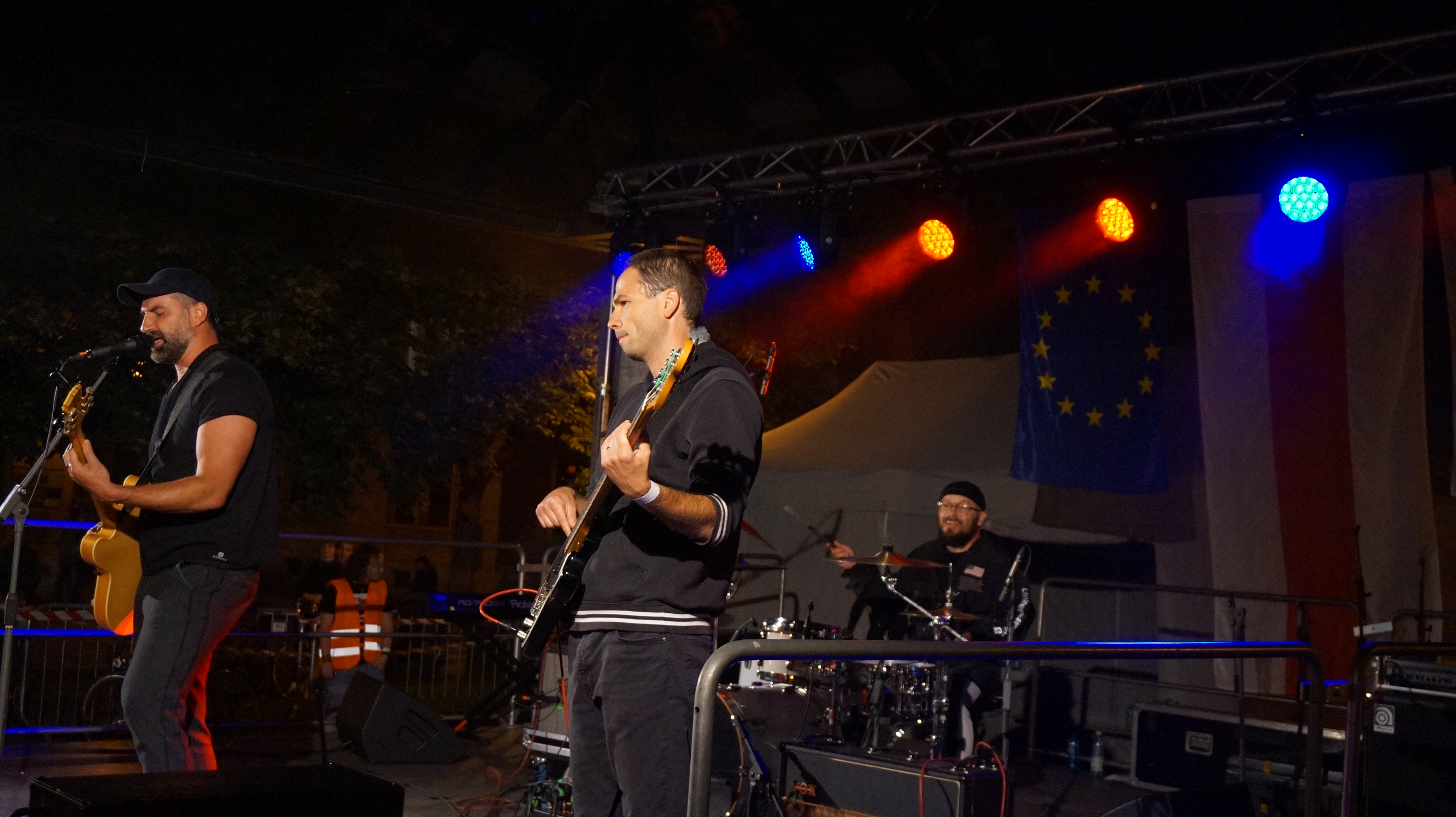
Korben Dallas at the concert for free Belarus. September 2020 in Bratislava

== Discography ==
=== Albums ===
All albums published by Slnko records, aside from the band's first album, Pekné cesty, which was published by Hevhetia.

- 2011: Pekné cesty ("Pleasant Journeys"), live album
- 2013: Karnevalová vrana ("Carnival Crow"), studio album
- 2014: Banská Bystrica (named after the Slovak town), studio album
- 2015: Kam ideme ("Where We're Going"), studio album made in collaboration with the Slovak Radio Symphony Orchestra
- 2017: Stredovek ("Middle Ages"), studio album
- 2019: Bazén ("Swimming Pool"), studio album
- 2022: Deti rýb ("The Children of Fish"), studio album
- 2023: Nekonečne ("Endlessly"), studio album made in collaboration with Aneta Langerová
- 2024: Pohyb! ("Move!"), studio album
- 2026: Čomu uveríš ("What You Believe"), studio album

== Members ==
- Juraj Benetin – vocals, guitar
- Lukáš Fila – bass guitar
- Igor "Ozo" Guttler – drums
- Ľuboslav Petruška – guitar
