= New Scene =

Theatre in Bratislava, Slovakia

Coordinates: 48°8′59″N 17°6′41″E

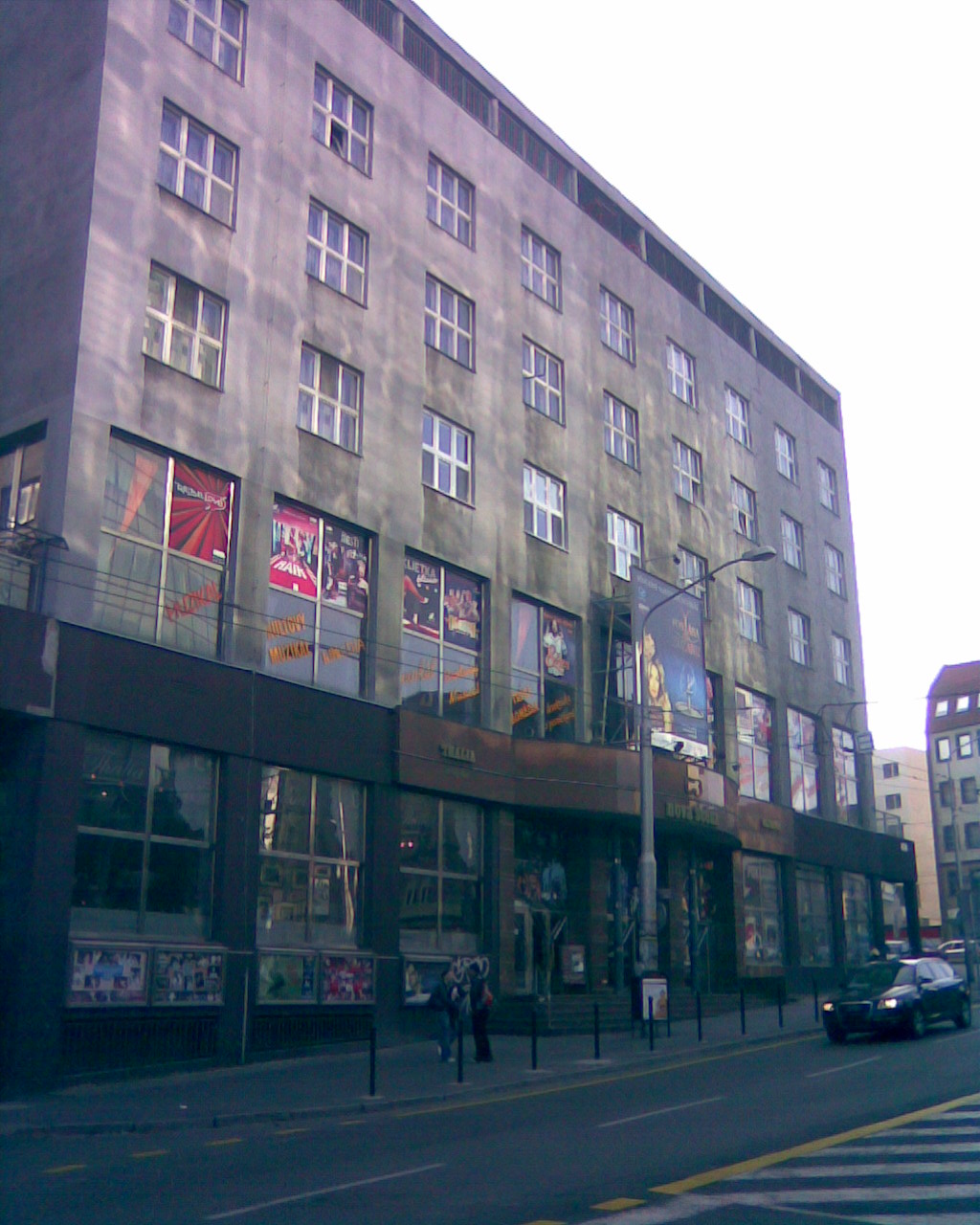
Nová scéna theatre building in Bratislava

New Scene (Slovak: Nová scéna, abr. ND) is a theatre located in Bratislava, the capital of Slovakia. It specializes in mainstream and Musical theatre such as musicals, comedies and fairy tales. The theatre was established in 1945 as part of a program to establish a network of theaters in the post-war years in the Slovak part of Czechoslovakia as the second theatre in Slovakia.

The first premiere in the theatre was Shakespeare's The Taming of the Shrew on 30 November 1946, directed by Drahoš Želenský.

== Building ==
The New Scene theatre is housed inside the Živnostenský dom (Živnodom) building on Živnostenská Street No. 1, in central Bratislava, where it re-used the space formerly occupied by the Alfa cinema.

== See also ==
- Slovak National Theatre
- Slovak culture
- Park One
