= Zuzana Kronerová =

Slovak actress (born 1952)

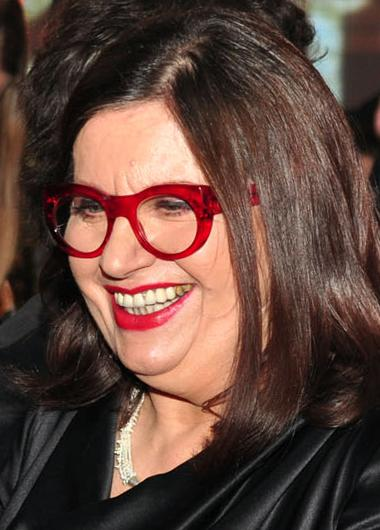
- Born: 17 April 1952 (age 74); Martin, Czechoslovakia
- Education: VŠMU, Bratislava (1974)
- Occupation: Actress
- Years active: 1976–present
- Employers: DPDM (1974–79); NS (1979–89); Astorka Korzo ’90 (since 1991)
- Spouse: Milan Hladký
- Children: Tereza Hladká (1986); Adam Hladký (1988)
- Parents: Jozef Kroner (1924–98); Terézia Hurbanová (1924–99)
- Relatives: Ján Kroner (uncle); Janko Kroner (cousin); Ján Lehotský (brother-in-law)
- Website: Astorka Korzo ’90 Theater

Zuzana Kronerová (born 17 April 1952) is a Slovak film, television and stage actress. She has been featured in more than twenty films to date.

== Filmography ==
Selected works

- 1981: Infidelity in a Slovak Way (originally made-for-TV; as Zlatka)
  - Phoenix (as Helga)
- 1982: Scrawls (as Teacher)
- 1991: When the Stars Were Red (as Beta)
- 2001: The Wild Bees (as Lisajová)
- 2003: Pupendo
- 2005: Something Like Happiness (as Aunt)
- 2008: The Country Teacher (as Mother)
  - Gypsy Virgin (as Phuri Daj)
- 2009: T.M.A. (as Shopping assistant)
  - Unknown Hour (as Sister in charge)
- 2010: Surviving Life (as Milada)
  - Habermann (a.k.a. Habermann's Mill; as Eliška)
- 2015: Home Care
- 2016: Červená kapitán
- 2017: Ice Mother
- 2020: Shadow Country

== Awards ==
Chronological list of received awards and nominations
Year	Nominated work	Award	Category	Result	
1997	Mother (by J. A. Pitínský; title r.)	DOSKY Awards	Best Actress in a Play	Won	
2000	Herself (various performances)	OTO Awards	TV Female Actor	Nominated	
2001	The Wild Bees (as Lisajová)	Czech Lion Awards	Best Supporting Actress	Won	
2006	The President and Eve of Retirement (by Bernhard; as Viera)	DOSKY Awards	Best Actress in a Play	Nominated	
2006	The President and Eve of Retirement (by Bernhard; as Viera)	LitFond Awards	Drama – DAK '90 Theater	Shared^{†}	
2008	The Mother of Evil (by Mario Gelardi; title r.)	LitFond Awards	Drama – DAK '90 Theater	Shared^{†}	
2008	The Mother of Evil (by Mario Gelardi; title r.)	DOSKY Awards	Best Actress in a Play	Nominated	
2008	The Country Teacher (as Mother)	Czech Lion Awards	Best Supporting Actress	Nominated	
2010	Habermann (as Eliška)	Czech Lion Awards	Best Supporting Actress	Nominated	
2010	Unknown Hour	Sun in Net Awards	Best Supporting Actress	Nominated	
2010	August: Osage County (as Violet Weston)	LitFond Awards	Drama – SKD Theater	Shared^{†}	‡
2011	August: Osage County (as Violet Weston)	Crystal Wing Awards	Theater and Audiovisual Art	Won	
2011	Herself (various performances)	Art Film Fest Awards	Actor's Mission	Honored	
2011	Happy endings (by S. Štepka; as Emy)	LitFond Awards	Drama – RND Theater	Shared^{†}	
2015	Home Care (as Miriam)	Czech Lion Awards	Best Supporting Actress	Pending	
2017	Červená kapitán (as Marika Kovacicová-Malachovská)	Sun in a Net Awards	Best Supporting Actress	Won	
† The LitFond Awards are annually bestowed to a large numbers of VA per category. ‡ Also for Long Day's Journey into Night (as Mary Cavan Tyrone).

== See also ==
- List of people surnamed Kroner

== Sources ==
- "Zuzana Kronerová > Stageography". Astorka Korzo ’90 Theater (in Slovak). Divadlo Astorka Korzo ’90. astorka.sk. Archived from the original on October 4, 2010.
- Renáta Šmatláková (ed.). "Zuzana Kronerová > Filmography". Slovak Film Database (in English and Slovak). Slovak Film Institute. sfd.sfu.sk. Archived from the original on April 2, 2015.
- "Zuzana Kronerová > Filmography". Czecho-Slovak Film Database (in Czech and Slovak). POMO Media Group. csfd.cz.
