= Zuzana Kanócz =

Slovak actress

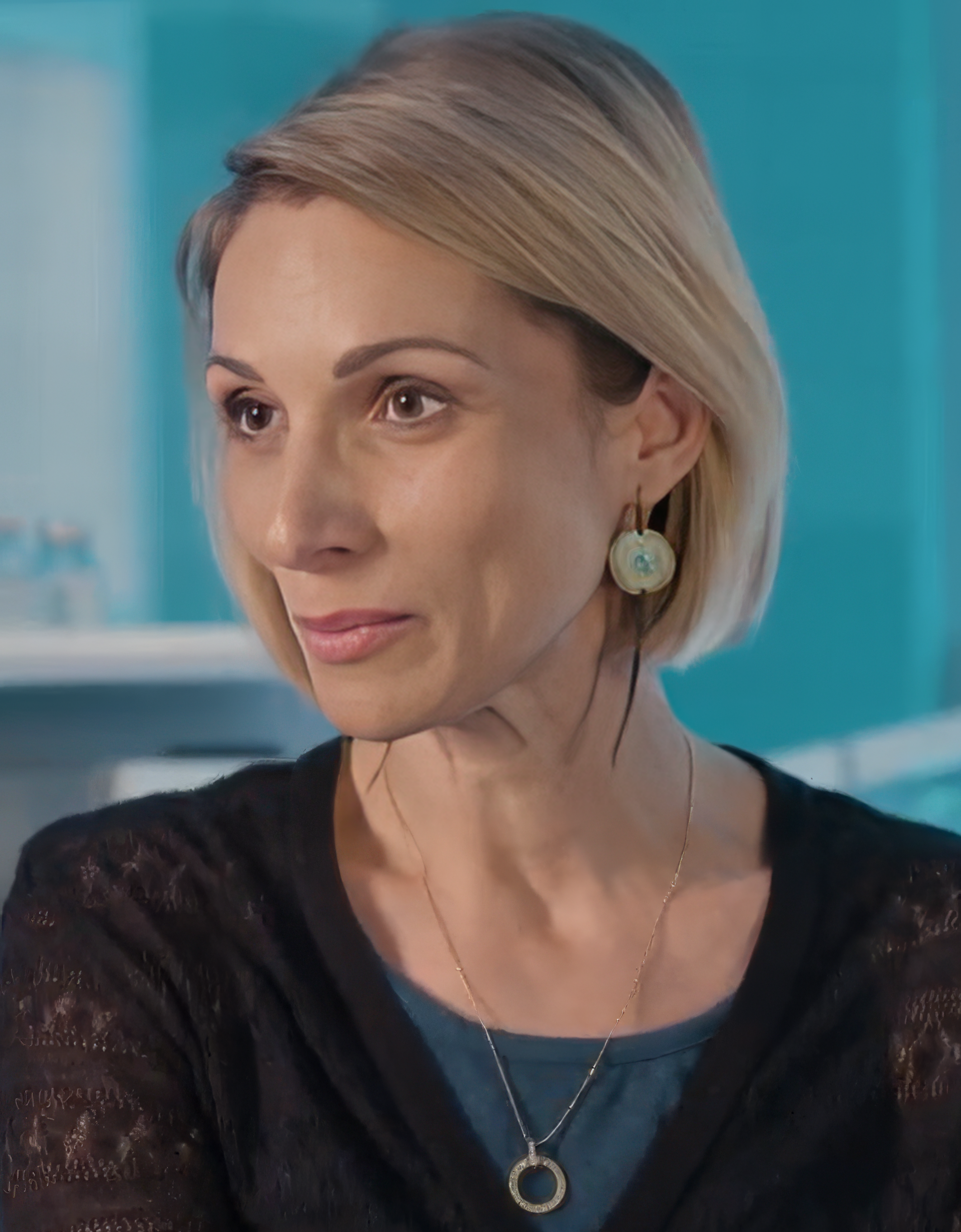
- Born: 21 November 1979 (age 46); Košice, Czechoslovakia (now Slovakia)
- Occupation: Actress
- Years active: 2002–present

Zuzana Kanócz, also known as Zuzana Kanóczová (born 21 November 1979) is a Slovak actress.

At the 2007 DOSKY Awards she won in the category of Best Actress, for her performances in the play Portia Coughlanová. Kanócz studied at the Academy of Performing Arts in Bratislava (VŠMU), graduating in 2002. She then joined the Andrej Bagar Theatre. Kanócz was nominated for the 2012 OTO Award for TV Female Actor, but the award went to Monika Hilmerová. She gave birth to her third child in 2018.

== Selected filmography ==
- Kruté radosti (2002)
- Román pro ženy (2005)
