= Ľuboš Kostelný =

Slovak actor

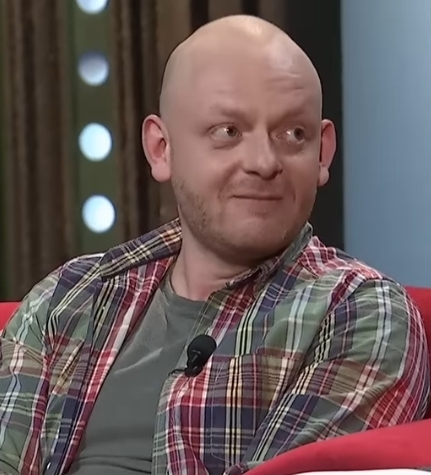
Ľuboš Kostelný in 2015

Ľuboš Kostelný is a Slovak stage, television and film actor.

== Biography ==
He was born 5 July 1981 in Martin, Czechoslovakia. He studied the Conservatory and VŠMU in Bratislava. He is a member of the ensemble of the Slovak National Theatre.

He was among two Slovaks injured in 2011 Domodedovo International Airport bombing, with the actress Zuzana Fialová.

== Awards ==
He was awarded the DOSKY Awards in 2022 for portraying the Prince Hamlet character in Hamlet at the Summer Shakespeare Festival at the Bratislava Castle.

== Filmography ==
- 3 sezóny v pekle (3 Seasons in Hell) (2009)
- "Ako som prežil" (2009) TV series ....
- Bratislavafilm (2009)
- "Profesionáli" (2008) TV series
- Taková normální rodinka (2008)
- Ženy môjho muža (2008)
- Muzika (2007) .... Martin
- O rodičích a dětech (2007)
- Podvraťáci (2005) (TV) ... Emilián
- Slunečný stát (The City of the Sun) (2005) .... Vinco
- Ticho (2005) (TV) .... Karol
- "Záchranáři" (2001) TV series .... Martin Stropko
- Rebelové (2001) .... Eman
- Krajinka (2000) .... Vinco
- Sokoliar Tomáš (1999) .... Vincko
- Katarína Hudáková odišla na večnosť (1997)

== Theatre ==
=== National Theatre ===
- Incident .... Artie
- Kaukazský kriedový kruh .... Azdak
- Platonov .... Platonov
- Bash .... John
- V hodine rysa .... Boy
- Mizantrop .... Filint
- Veľkolepý paroháč .... Bruno
- Hra o svätej Dorote .... Devil
- Dom nad oceánom .... Lionel
- Ignorant a šialenec .... Doctor
- Tak sa na mňa prilepila .... Bouzin
- Manon Lescaut .... Des Grieux
- Hana Jurgová .... Jurga
- Mrzák z Inishmaanu .... Billy
- Hamlet .... Hamlet
- Plantáž .... Matúš/Téza
- Three Sisters .... Aleksey Petrovich Feoditik
- Tanec toreádorov .... Gaston
