= Anna Šišková =

Slovak actress (born 1960)

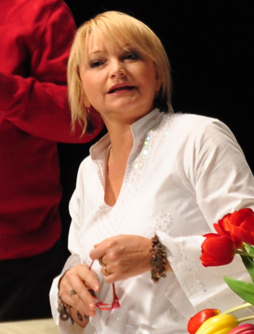
- Šišková in 2011
- Born: 30 June 1960 (age 64); Žilina, Czechoslovakia
- Occupation: Actress
- Years active: 1983–present
- Children: Dorota Nvotová; Tereza Nvotová

Anna Šišková (born 30 June 1960) is a Slovak actress. She won the Czech Lion award for Best Actress in 2000 for her role in the Academy Award-nominated film Divided We Fall. Her daughters, Dorota Nvotová, and Tereza Nvotová are also actresses.
