= Lukáš Latinák =

Slovak actor

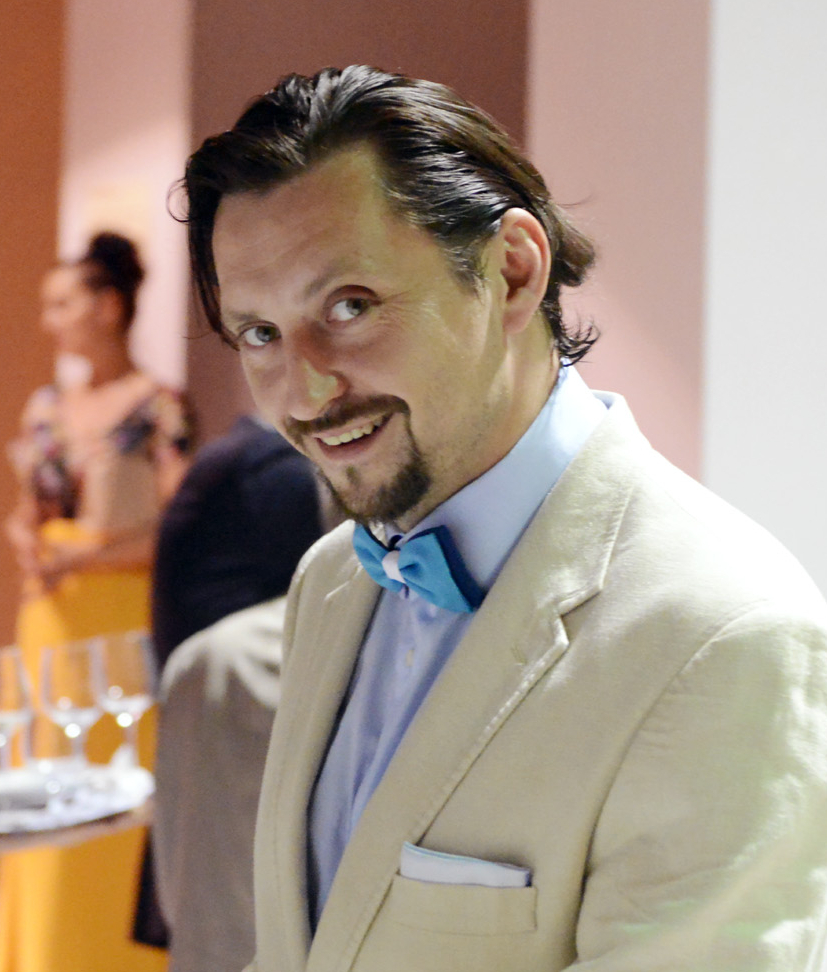
- Born: 28 February 1977 (age 49); Brezno, Czechoslovakia
- Occupation: Actor
- Years active: 1996–present
- Spouse: Anna Latináková (m. 2008; div. 2025)
- Children: 2
- Website: Astorka Korzo ’90 Theater

Lukáš Latinák (born 28 February 1977) is a Slovak film, television, and stage actor. He is a recipient of three OTO Awards in the main categories. Latinák is a VŠMU alumnus. On stage, he is best known for his spells with Astorka Korzo '90 Theatre.

== Biography ==
Lukáš Latinák was born on 28 February 1977 in the town of Brezno in Central Slovakia. He grew up in the nearby villages of Heľpa and Hriňová. He studied acting at the Academy of Performing Arts in Bratislava.

In September 2024, Latinák was a target of an internet hoax which reported his death, leading the readers to financial scam accounts.

== Personal life ==
In 2008, Latinák married Anna Latináková. The couple had two sons and divorced in 2025.

== Selected filmography ==
- Kruté radosti (2002)
- Děvčátko (2002)
- Walking Too Fast (2010)
- Identity Card (2010)
- Díra u Hanušovic (2014)
- Doktor Martin (television, 2015)
- Rex (television, 2017)
- Invalid (2023)

== Awards ==
Year	Nominated work	Award	Category	Result
2010	Pouta	Czech Lion Awards	Best Supporting Actor	Nominated
2010	Himself	OTO Awards	Absolute OTO	Yes
2010	Himself	OTO Awards	TV Male Actor – Comedy	Won
2011	Himself	OTO Awards	TV Male Actor – Comedy	Won
2012	Himself	OTO Awards	TV Male Actor	Nominated
2013	Himself	OTO Awards	TV Male Actor	Won
2014	Himself	OTO Awards	TV Male Actor	Nominated
