= Jozef Kroner =

Slovak actor (1924–1998)

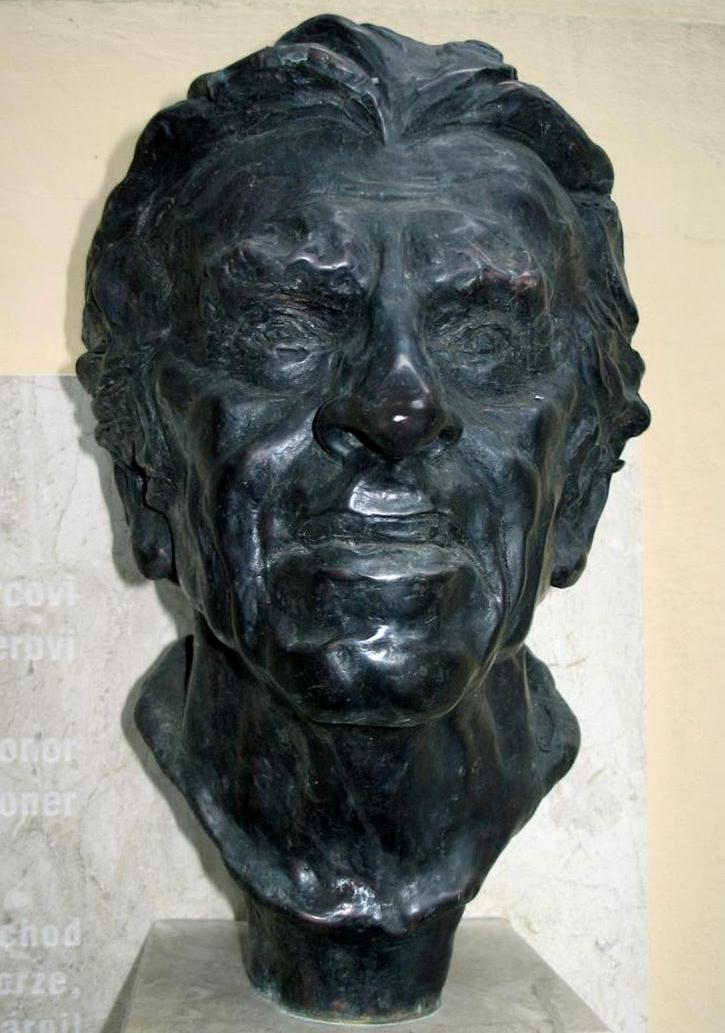

Jozef Kroner (20 March 1924 in Staškov – 12 March 1998 in Bratislava) was a Slovak actor. His brother Ľudovít Kroner, daughter Zuzana Kronerová, and wife Terézia Hurbanová-Kronerová were also actors. He starred in the Oscar-winning film The Shop on Main Street, and in more than 50 other Slovak films, as well as in several Czech, Bulgarian and Hungarian productions. He never studied acting; his career started in amateur theater troupes.

His biography Jozef Kroner's Tracks (Trate Jozefa Kronera) was produced by director Fero Fenič in 1987. Jozef Kroner is also an author of several mostly autobiographic books.

== Jozef Kroner Awards ==
Since 2001, Jozef Kroner Awards are presented annually by the Jozef Kroner Foundation, established after the death of the artist.

== Filmography ==
- 1949: Katka (majster Jozef)
- 1951: Akce B (švec)
- 1953: Pole neorané (Šimon Perďoch)
- 1954: Drevená dedina (Ondro Chlistoň)
- 1955: Štvorylka (krajčír Sásik)
- 1956: Čert nespí (porotca, kádrovák Merinda, inžinier Martvoň)
- 1957: Posledná bosorka (Jakub Krvaj)
- 1957: Zemianska česť (Jonáš)
- 1958: Statočný zlodej (Jožko Púčik)
- 1958: Šťastie príde v nedeľu
- 1960: Jerguš Lapin (strýko Košaľkuľa)
- 1961: Pokorené rieky (Juraj Brondoš).
- 1962: Polnočná omša (Valentín Kubiš)
- 1962/63: Jánošík I-II (otec Uhorčík)
- 1965: Obchod na korze (Tóno Brtko)
- 1965: Kubo (Kubo)
- 1966: Lidé z maringotek (klaun Ferdinand)
- 1967: Muž, který stoupl v ceně (pán Benda)
- 1968: Dialóg 20-40-60 (starec)
- 1968: Muž, ktorý luže (Franz)
- 1968: Traja svedkovia (dr. Schwartz)
- 1969: Touha zvaná Anada (Koktavý)
- 1970: Pán si neželal nič (Ctibor)
- 1970: Rysavá jalovica (Adam Krt)
- 1972: Zajtra bude neskoro (učiteľ)
- 1972: Prečo Adam Chvojka vicerichtár spáva doma (Adam Chvojka)
- 1973: Očovské pastorále (Cesnak)
- 1973: Putovanie do San Jaga (Carlo)
- 1973: Végül [Nakoniec], r. Gyula Maár, Maďarsko (János Varga)
- 1973: Vymenená princezná (Kráľ)
- 1975: Pacho, hybský zbojník (Pacho Matrtaj)
- 1976: Stratená dolina (Gamboš)
- 1976: Sváko Ragan (Sváko Ragan)
- 1976: Teketória [Okolky], r. Gyula Maár, Maďarsko
- 1977: Vianočné oblátky (Jano Predaj)
- 1979: Két történet a félmúltból [Dva príbehy z nedávnej minulosti], pov. A téglafal mögött [Za tehlovou stenou], r. Karoly Makk, Maďarsko (Ferenc Bódi).
- 1979: Mišo (Mišo)
- 1981: Kosenie Jastrabej lúky (otec Martin Hudec)
- 1981: Megáll az idő [Čas sa zastaví], r. Péter Gothár, Maďarsko (triedny profesor)
- 1981: Tegnap elött [Predvčerom], r. Péter Bacsó, Maďarsko
- 1982: Egymásra nézve [Iný pohľad], r. Károly Makk, Maďarsko
- 1982: Popolvár najväčší na svete (sluha Šablica)
- 1982: Přeludy pouště (Sidi Ali)
- 1982: Soľ nad zlato (šašo)
- 1983: Tisícročná včela (Martin Pichanda)
- 1987: Neďaleko do neba (Šimaľa)
- 1987: Posledný rukopis [Az utolsó kézirat], r. Károly Makk, Maďarsko (György Nyáry)
- 1988: Lovec senzací (Šnórer)
- 1988: Vlakári (dedo Homola)
- 1989: Můj přítel d'Artagnan (Křepelka)
- 1989: Ty, ktorý si na nebesiach [Ti, kojto si nebeto], r. Dočo Bodžakov, Bulharsko (George Henih)
- 1990: Árnyék a havon [Tieň na snehu], r. Attila Janisch, Maďarsko
- 1992: Dedičstvo alebo Kurvahošigutntag (Košťál)
- 1994: Vášnivý bozk (Schneider)
- 1995: ...ani smrt nebere! (Martin Janák–Štipaný)

== See also ==
- List of people surnamed Kroner
