= Szidi Tobias discography =

- Studio albums: 6
- Extended plays: 1
- Soundtrack albums: 1
- Music videos: 1
- Box sets: 1
- Other appearances: 10

The solo discography of Slovak recording artist Szidi Tobias consists of six studio albums, one box set, an extended play and a music video. As featured vocalist, she participated on five compilations, one original motion picture soundtrack as well one video album.

Tobias entered the music industry with delivering two compositions for the soundtrack Fontána pre Zuzanu 2, issued via Tommü Records in 1993. While one of those served as her duet with Pavol Habera, the second entitled "Chlap z kríža" was a pop rock-infused track performed solely on her own. Despite the song received much airplay upon its release, her recording career went on hiatus afterwards. By the end of the 1990s, Tobias thus focused primarily on acting, appearing overall in four feature films, such as Let asfaltového holuba (1991), Díky za každé nové ráno (1994), Vášnivý bozk (1995) and Orbis Pictus (1997). Her debut album, Divý mak, saw its eventual release on BMG Ariola in 2001. The set with featuring lyrics-driven songs, written mainly by her later spouse Peter Lipovský and Milan Vyskočáni, was viewed as a commercial failure.

Prior to the launching of her next output, Tobias was cast on the screen in Kruté radosti (2002) and Zostane to medzi nami (2003), respectively. Musically, she first returned on various artist compilation Tak to chodí (2003), produced by Michal Horáček. Following that, her second BMG album was issued on December 8, 2003. As with her previous release, neither Punto Fijo achieved a presence in the official albums charts. Nevertheless, its ballad repertoire with jazz, folk and ska-inspired music brought Tobias favorable feedback from music critics. In 2006, she appeared as guest on Horáček's follow-up project, Strážce plamene. The multi-platinum compilation and Anděl Awards-nominee for the Album of the Year, included a solo track designed for herself by Petr Hapka — "Na hotelu v Olomouci". The composition wouldn't crack the Rádio Top 100 Oficiální, but her vocal performance has been generally viewed by many as the best of the set, and singer gradually started to gain her own fan base in the Czech Republic.

Accompanied with a line-up of other female vocalists coming from both sides of former Czechoslovakia, Tobias joined Horáček also on his next release Ohrožený druh (2008), which won the 18th Anděl's ceremony. This time around, she contributed with a Czech cover version of Tanita Tikaram's "Twist in My Sobriety" and "Esik az eső, csendesen" by Vyskočáni, sung partly in Hungarian. On November 24, Pod obojím (2008) was released through independent art company Studio DVA, involved exclusively in theatrical productions. Supported by such artist as Richard Müller, her third studio album was produced by Michal Hrubý. After its slow sale, the work was eventually certified Gold by the ČNS IFPI, reaching its peak on the local music chart at number #24. Besides, the chanteuse is more often referred to as "The First Lady of Czech Chanson", becoming the successor of critically acclaimed Hana Hegerová, originally also from Slovakia. Her fourth chanson standards collection was titled Do vetra, and launched in December 2010. Apart from Lipovský-Vyskočáni both recognized as her regular tandem, for some of new lyrics also Horáček was credited. Along with the album's ten weeks long run on the charts (climbing to number #23), singer embarked on a tour of the same name.

"Na hotelu v Olomouci"
Her critically most acclaimed composition written by Horáček and Hapka for their compilation Strážce plamene (2006).

Most currently, Tobias recorded a pop tuned song called "Brehy", issued as the main theme of her latest film Apricot Island (2011). In addition, an acoustic version of the track was attached to her most recent studio set Ať se dobré děje, released to positive reviews on November 21, 2011. As support, promotional EP Vánoční koleda with two previously unreleased tracks, followed simultaneously.

== Albums ==
=== Studio albums ===
Year	Album details	Charts	Sales	Certifications
Year	Album details	CZ	Sales	Certifications
2001	Divý mak^{[A]}: Label: BMG Ariola (#74321 84289 2; #MH01-2009); Format: CD	—		
2003	Punto Fijo^{[A]}: Label: BMG Ariola (#MH02-2009); Format: CD	—		
2008	Pod obojím: Label: Studio DVA (#MH01-2008); Format: CD	24	CZ: 5,000	Gold
2010	Do vetra: Label: Studio DVA (#MH01-2010); Format: CD	23		
2011	Ať se dobré děje: Label: Studio DVA (#MH02-2011); Format: CD	23		
2014	Jolanka: Label: Pavian (#PM0085-2); Format: CD	8		
"—" denotes an album that did not chart and/or was not released in that region.

Notes

- A Initial studio albums by Tobias Divý mak (2000) and Punto Fijo (2003) were originally released on BMG Ariola. In 2009, both sets were re-issued by Studio DVA.

=== Soundtracks ===
Year	Album details	Notes
1993	Fontána pre Zuzanu 2: Label: Tommü Records (#610049-2331); Format: CD	Tobias contributed with two tracks - "Chlap z kríža" and a duet with Pavol Habera called "Pomník šibnutým".

=== Box sets ===
Year	Album details	Notes
2013	5 pohromadě: Label: Studio DVA (#unknown); Format: 5x CD	A limited edition box set with five studio albums by Tobias - Divý mak (2001), Punto Fijo (2003), Pod obojím (2008), Do vetra (2010) and Ať se dobré děje (2011), issued exclusively in 300 copies.

== Extended plays ==
Year	EP details	Notes
2011	Vánoční koleda: Label: Studio DVA (#MH01-2011); Format: CD	Promotional five track EP with two new songs, "Boží dvůr" and "Městu i světu", from musical theatre A Christmas Carol. The rest tracks included "Dala som milému", "Bylobudenení" and "Poď".

== Other appearances ==
Year	Song	Notes
2003	"Kirké"	Songs recorded for the compilation Tak to chodí by Michal Horáček and Jarda Svoboda. (The album charted at number 43 in CZ).
2003	"Abraham a Sára vybírají DESET SPRAVEDLIVÝCH na okrese Sodoma-Východ" (with Jan Spálený)	Songs recorded for the compilation Tak to chodí by Michal Horáček and Jarda Svoboda. (The album charted at number 43 in CZ).
2003	"Tak dobře, ještě chvíli"	Songs recorded for the compilation Tak to chodí by Michal Horáček and Jarda Svoboda. (The album charted at number 43 in CZ).
2006	"Na hotelu v Olomouci"	A track recorded for the compilation Strážce plamene by Hapka & Horáček. (The set topped the album's chart in CZ, selling over 62,000 copies.)
2008	"Esik az eső, csendesen"	Songs recorded for the compilation Ohrožený druh by Horáček. (The set topped the album's chart in CZ, selling over 35,000 units.)
2008	"Závoj tkaný touhami" (by Tanita Tikaram)	Songs recorded for the compilation Ohrožený druh by Horáček. (The set topped the album's chart in CZ, selling over 35,000 units.)
2011	"Brehy (Original version)"	The main theme for Apricot Island. (An alternate version of the track was issued on Ať se dobré děje).
2011	"Track 3 (Untitled)"	An unreleased track, also recorded for Apricot Island (2011).
2011	"Tante Cose da Veder"	A track recorded for the compilation Tante Cose da Veder by Horáček, Hapka & Brzobohatý (The album charted at number 24 in CZ).
2013	"Čas chladných rán a jasných vod"	A track recorded for the compilation Český kalendář by Horáček (The set topped the album's chart in CZ).

== Videos ==
=== Music videos ===
Year	Song	Notes
2007	"Na hotelu v Olomouci"	Directed by Cyril Podolský (The work was issued on DVD compilation Strážce plamene v obrazech by Hapka & Horáček which charted at number 2 in CZ).
