= List of Slovak film directors =

This article provides a list of Slovak film directors.

== A ==
- Vlado Adásek (Vladimír Adásek)

== B ==
- Ivan Balaďa
- Vladimír Balco
- Pavol Barabáš
- Stanislav Barabáš
- Vladimír Bahna
- Peter Bebjak
- Paľo Bielik
- Juraj Bindzár
- Eva Borušovičová
- Jozef Budský

== C ==
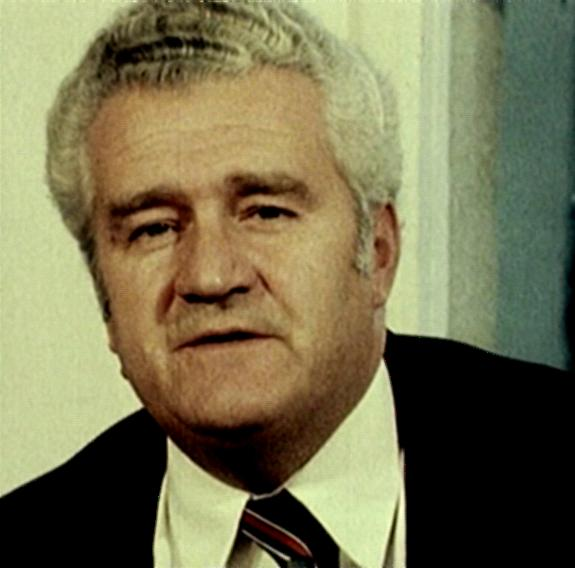
Igor Ciel

- Igor Ciel

== D ==
- Gejza Dezorz
- Alois Ditrich

== F ==
- Rudolf Ferko
- Ľudovít Filan
- Zita Furková

== G ==
- Pavel Gejdoš ml.
- Ján Gogál
- Eduard Grečner

== H ==
- Dušan Hanák
- Robert Hardónyi
- Pavol Haspra
- Elo Havetta
- Juraj Herz
- Jozef Heriban
- Peter Hledík
- Martin Hollý junior (born 1931)
- Miroslav Horňák

== I ==
- Samuel Ivaška

== J ==
- Juraj Jakubisko
- Július Jarábek
- Ondrej Jariabek

== K ==
- Ján Kadár
- Vladimír Kavčiak
- Lucia Kašová
- Robert Kirchhoff
- Dušan Kodaj
- Ctibor Kováč
- Otakar Krivánek
- Jakub Kroner
- František Kudláč

== L ==
- Ján Lacko
- Leopold Lahola
- Andrej Lettrich
- Juraj Lihosit
- Miloslav Luther
- Štefan Lux

== M ==
- Oleg Makara
- Anton Majerčík
- Julius Matula
- Jozef Medveď
- Matej Mináč

== N ==
- Juraj Nvota

== P ==
- Stanislav Párnický
- Vladislav Pavlovič
- Roman Petrenko
- Ján Piroh Dimitrij Plichta

== R ==
- Dušan Rapoš
- Ivan Reitman
- Jozef Režucha

== S ==
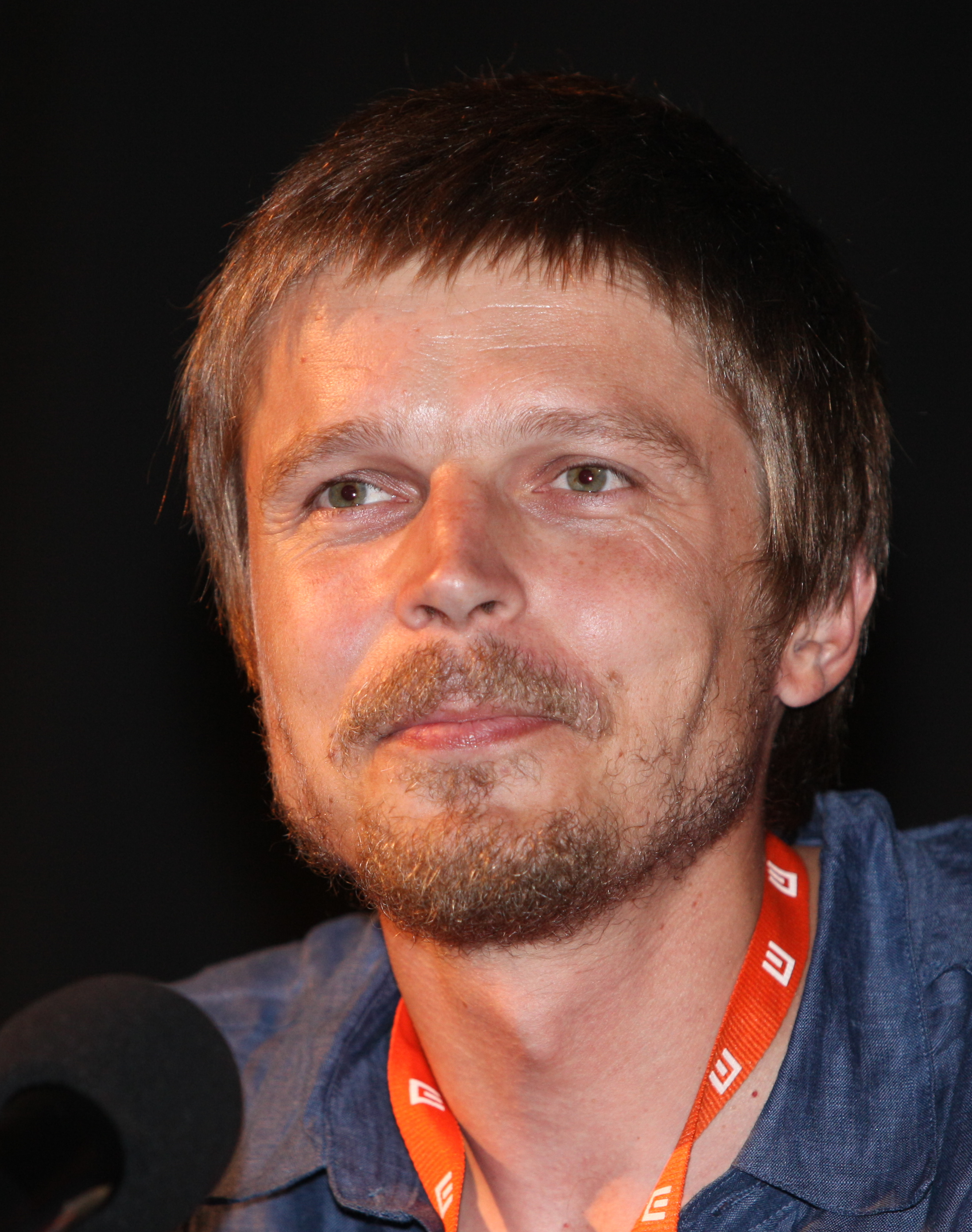
Marko Škop (2009)

- Štefan Semjan
- Jaroslav Siakeľ (Slovak-American)
- Laura Siváková
- Miroslav Šindelka
- Marko Škop
- Jozef Slovák
- Peter Solan
- Martin Šulík
- Katarína Šulajová
- Eva Štefankovičová
- Vladimír Štric

== T ==
- Dušan Trančík
- Martin Ťapák

== U ==
- Štefan Uher
- Rudolf Urc

== V ==
- Martin Valent
- Jaroslav Vojtek

== Z ==
- Zoro Záhon (Zoroslav Záhon)
- Jozef Zachar
- Ján Zeman
- František Žáček

== Slovak women film directors ==
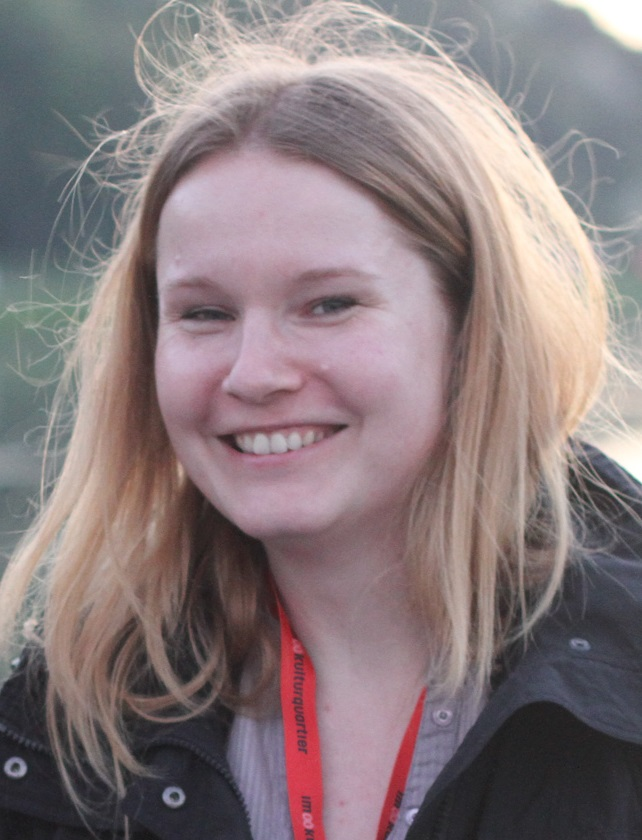
Iveta Grófová

- Mira Fornay
- Iveta Grófová
- Zuzana Liová
- Tereza Nvotová
- Zuzana Piussi

== Bibliography ==
- Václav Macek, Jelena PaStéková: Dejiny slovenskej kinematografie. Vydavatel’stvo Osveta, 1997.
- Renata Smatláková, Martina Smatlák: Filmové profily, slovenský reziséri hraných filmov (Film Profiles, Slovak Feature Film Directors). Slovenský filmový ústav, 2005.
- Pavol Branko: Straty a nálezy. Slovenkský filmový ústav, 2005.
- Stefan VraStiak, Marianna Forrayová, Rudolf Urc: Slovenský animovaný film. Slovenský filmový ústav, 1996.

== See also ==
- Cinema of Slovakia
