= Zuzana Fialová =

Slovak actress

- Born: 17 May 1974 (age 51); Bratislava, Czechoslovakia
- Occupation(s): actress, director
- Years active: 1989–present
- Employer(s): SND, Bratislava (2003–2010)
- Organization: VŠMU, Bratislava
- Children: David Matulík (1997)
- Website: Slovak National Theatre

Zuzana Fialová (born 17 May 1974 in Bratislava, Czechoslovakia) is a Slovak actress.

She attended the music and drama department at the Conservatory in Bratislava, and in 1998 graduated acting studies at the drama faculty of the Academy of Performing Arts in Bratislava. She is divorced and has a son.

In 2006, she won the first season of the Slovak version of Dancing with the Stars entitled Let's Dance.

In January 2011, Fialová was among those injured in the Domodedovo International Airport bombing.

== Filmography ==
Year	Title	Director
Cinema
1992	Veľkonočný sen	Lucia Šebová
1993	Prípad na vidieku	Stanislav Párnický
1994	Vášnivé známosti (Lusty Liaisons)	David Kellogg
1996	Jaškov sen	Eduard Grečner
2001	Babí léto (Autumn Spring)	Vladimír Michálek
2004	It Will Stay Between Us	Miroslav Šindelka
2006	I Served the King of England	Jiří Menzel
2006	Pravidla lži (Rules of Lies)	Robert Sedláček
2006	Veľké šťastie	Ľubomír Vajdička
2007	Teddy Bear	Jan Hřebejk
2008	Wino truskawkowe (Strawberry Wine)	Dariusz Jabłoński
2009	Bratislavafilm	Jakub Kroner
2009	The Case of Unfaithful Klara	Roberto Faenza
2009	Tango s komármi	Miloslav Luther
2011	Lidice	Petr Nikolaev
2012	Aftermath (Pokłosie)	Władysław Pasikowski
2017	The Line	Peter Bebjak

== Awards ==
Year	Award	Category	Nominated work	Result
Television
2006	Let's Dance	Best Dancer	Herself and Peter Modrovský	Won
2006	OTO Award^{[A]}	TV Female Actor	Various TV performances	Won
2007	OTO Award^{[A]}	TV Female Actor	Various TV performances	Won
2008	OTO Award^{[A]}	TV Female Actor	Various TV performances	Nominated
Stage
2003	Talent Award	Best Actor Under 30 Years		Won
2004	DOSKY Award	Best Actress	Arabian Night by Roland Schimmelpfennig	Nominated
2005	DOSKY Award	Best Actress	Hypermarket by Viliam Klimáček	Nominated
2005	LitFond Reward	Outstanding Performance	Hypermarket by Viliam Klimáček	Won
2006	LitFond Reward	Outstanding Performance	Valčík náhody by Victor Haïm	Won
2006	To Najlepšie z Humoru Festival	Jury Prize	Valčík náhody by Victor Haïm	Won
2007	DOSKY Award	Best Actress	Valčík náhody by Victor Haïm	Nominated
2008	LitFond Reward	For Theatre	Anna Karenina by Leo Tolstoy	Won

Notes

- A APA published only Top 3 positions until 2008. In 2008, the actress was ranked at number #3 (following the winning Diana Mórová, and Michaela Čobejová as the second).
