= Szidi Tobias =

Slovak actress and singer (born 1967)

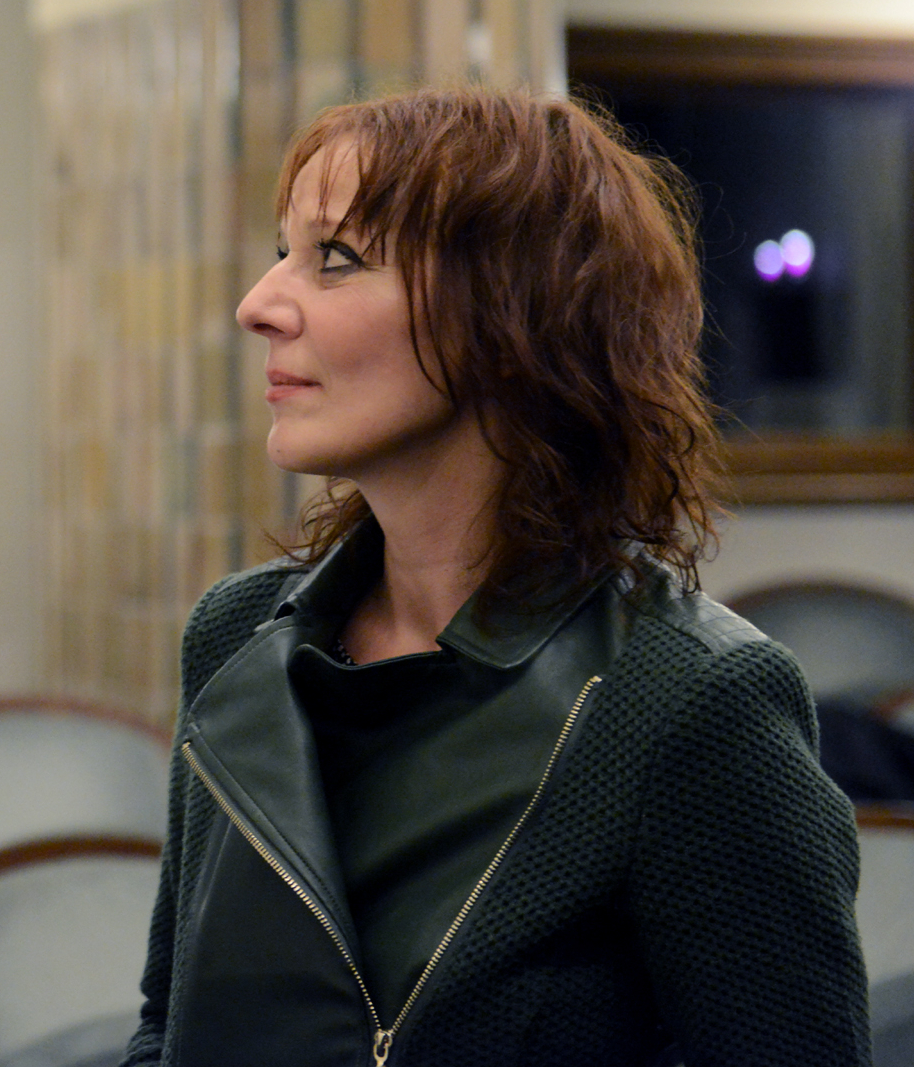
- Born: Sidónia Tobiášová; 28 May 1967 (age 58); Kráľovský Chlmec, Czechoslovakia
- Other names: Szidi Tóbiás (per Hungarian)
- Occupations: Actress, musician
- Years active: 1990–present
- Employer: Astorka Korzo '90, Bratislava
- Organization(s): Studio DVA, Prague
- Agent: Michal Hrubý
- Style: World music, folk, jazz, ska
- Spouse(s): Boris Zachar; Peter Lipovský
- Children: Krištof Zachar; Jonáš Lipovský; Johanka Lipovská (stepchild)
- Awards: Igric Award (2004); Dosky Award (2010)
- Website: sziditobias.cz

Szidi Tobias (Hungarian pronunciation: [ˈsidi ˈtɔbiaːʃ]; born 28 May 1967) is a Slovak actress and musician of Hungarian ethnicity. While in her native country she successfully developed an acting career, in the Czech Republic Tobias established herself as a singer of urban chanson.

== Discography ==
Studio albums

- 2001: Divý mak
- 2003: Punto Fijo
- 2008: Pod obojím
- 2010: Do vetra
- 2011: Ať se dobré děje
- 2014: Jolanka

EPs

- 2011: Vánoční koleda

== Filmography ==
=== Cinema ===
Year	Title	Role	Director	Production
Cinema
1991	Let asfaltového holuba	Milena	Vladimír Balco	Czechoslovakia
1994	Díky za každé nové ráno	Gypsy woman	Milan Šteindler	Czech Republic
1995	Vášnivý bozk	Blanka	Miroslav Šindelka	Czech Republic; Slovakia
1997	Orbis Pictus		Martin Šulík	Slovakia
2002	Kruté radosti	Ilona	Juraj Nvota	Slovakia; Czech Republic
2003	Zostane to medzi nami	Lea	Miroslav Šindelka	Slovakia; Czech Republic
2011	Apricot Island	Babika	Peter Bebjak	Slovakia

=== Television ===
Year	Title	Director	Production
Television
1992	Papierový drak	Igor Kováč	Czechoslovakia
1993	Zurvalec	Vladimír Strnisko	Slovakia
1993	Kazimír a Karolína^{[A]}	Juraj Nvota	Slovakia
1994	O Jankovi kľúčiarovi	Igor Kováč	Slovakia
1994	Gendúrovci	Pavol Gejdoš Jr	Slovakia
1995	Dušička	Juraj Nvota	Slovakia
1996	Čierna ovca	Juraj Nvota	Slovakia
1996	Smutný valčík	Jaroslav Rihák	Slovakia
1999	Klietka	Stanislav Párnický	Slovakia
2000	Chaos	Milan Lasica	Slovakia
2000	Slečna Dušehojivá	Juraj Nvota	Slovakia
2000	Vyhnanci	Alois Ditrich	Slovakia
2001	Pod hladinou	Pavol Korec	Slovakia
2003	Dlhá krátka noc	Peter Krištúfek	Slovakia
2007	Ordinácia v ružovej záhrade^{[B]}	Vladimír Fischer; Matúš Libovič; Stanislav Párnický	Slovakia
2008	Mesto tieňov^{[B]}	Gejza Dezorz; Peter Bebjak; Róbert Šveda	Slovakia

Notes

- A Denotes a televised theatre.
- B Denotes a TV series.

== Radiography ==
Year	Title	Director	Production
Radio dramas
1998	V snehu	Jaroslav Rihák	Slovakia
1999	Tajomstvo majstra Stradiváriho	Pavol Gejdoš	Slovakia
2000	Život a doba Mathiasa Bela	Martin Kákoš	Slovakia
	Smutný kankán	Martin Kákoš	Slovakia
2002	Milujte kráľovnú	Milena Lukáčová	Slovakia
2002	Mizantrop	Milena Lukáčová	Slovakia
2003	Hugo a Gavroche	Róbert Horňák	Slovakia
2004	Con te partiro	Róbert Horňák	Slovakia
	Rod Šulekovcov	Róbert Horňák	Slovakia
	Médea	Róbert Horňák	Slovakia
	Hmla nad riekou	Štefan Korenči	Slovakia
	Kristína		Slovakia
	Ofélia nie je mŕtva		Slovakia
2005	Súboj	Peter Jezný	Slovakia
2005	Albatros	Jaroslav Rihák	Slovakia
	Ema a Emil	Jaroslav Rihák	Slovakia
	Prekliatie Charlesa Baudlaira	Jaroslav Rihák	Slovakia
2007	Kolónia	Róbert Horňák	Slovakia
2008	Vražda na svadobnej ceste	Róbert Horňák	Slovakia
2010	Izrafel	Róbert Horňák	Slovakia
2010	Kliatba na Zobore	Róbert Horňák	Slovakia

== Awards ==
Year	Nominated work	Award	Category	Result
Stage
2007	Kentauri as Viera	LitFond Rewards^{[C]}	Outstanding Performance	Yes
2008	Tolstoj a peniaze as Sofia Behrs-Tolstoy	LitFond Rewards^{[C]}	Outstanding Performance	Yes
2009	Platonov as Anna Petrovna Voynitseva	LitFond Rewards^{[C]}	Outstanding Performance	Yes
2010	Platonov as Anna Petrovna Voynitseva	Dosky Awards	Best Female Performance	Nominated^{[D]}
2011	Gazdova krv as Woman	Dosky Awards	Best Female Performance	Won
2011	Gazdova krv as Woman	LitFond Rewards	Outstanding Performance	Yes
Television
2001	Pod hladinou	LitFond Rewards^{[C]}	Outstanding Performance	Yes
2002	Život ako večierok as Pamela Harriman	Golden Loop Awards	Best Female Dubber	Won
2004	Dlhá krátka noc	Art Film Fest Awards	Igric	Won
Cinema
2012	Apricot Island as Babika	Sun in a Net Awards	Best Actress	Nominated

Notes

- C Slovak LitFond Rewards are usually given to a large number of actors and/or directors at the same time, each calendar year.
- D With difference of only point (16 points in total) won Edita Borsová for her role of Bety in Máša & Beta. Tobias received 15 points, while Jana Oľhová accumulated 10 points for her role of Arsinoé in Mizantrop.

== See also ==
- List of Slovak submissions for the Academy Award for Best Foreign Language Film
- List of Czech submissions for the Academy Award for Best Foreign Language Film
