= Robert Kirchhoff =

Slovak film director

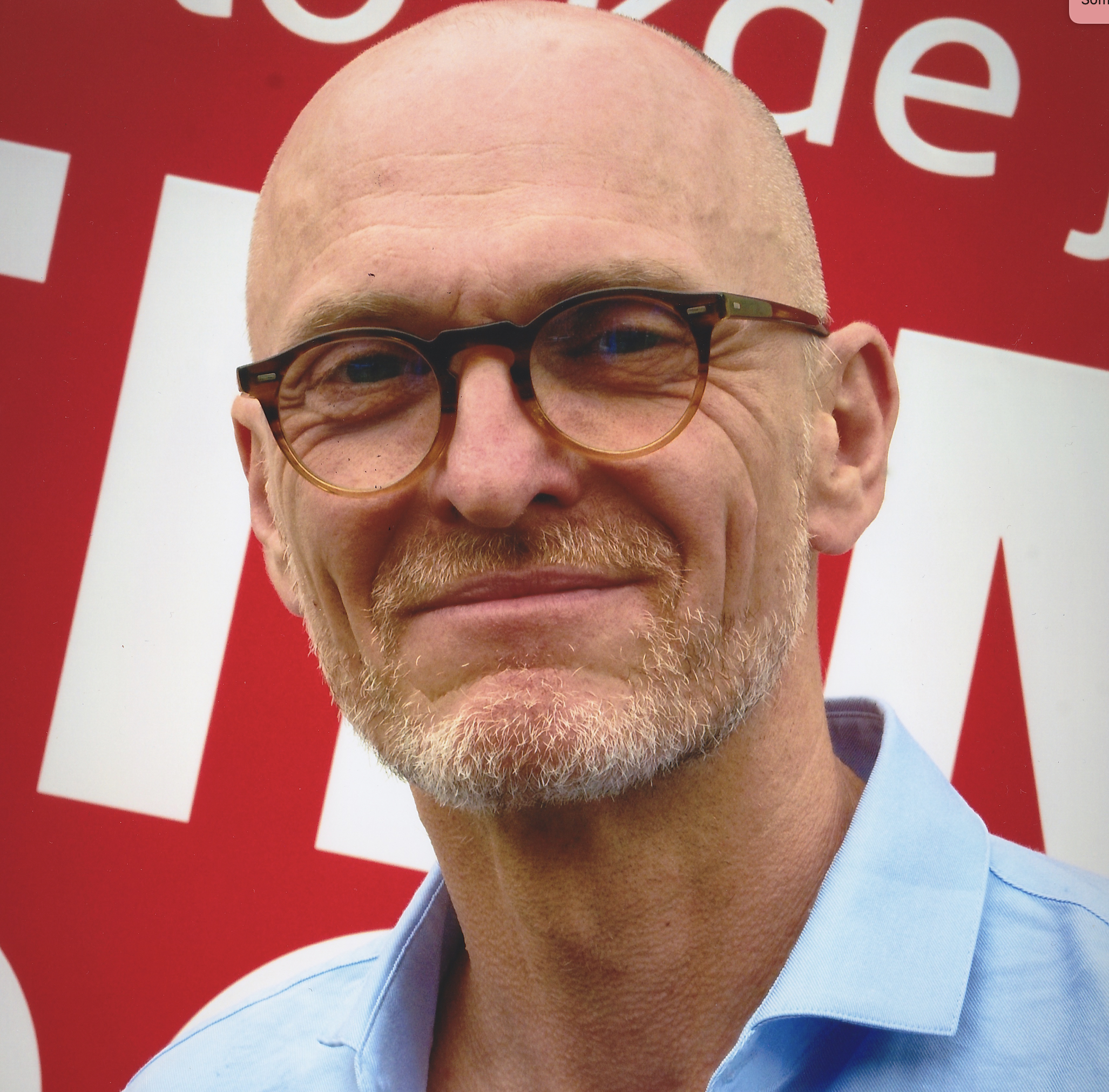
Robert Kirchhoff

Robert Kirchhoff (born May 7, 1968) is a Slovak independent film director, producer, cinematographer, and scriptwriter.

== Biography ==
Robert Kirchhoff was born in Nitra, Slovakia.

Between 1995 and 2000 he studied film directing at the Academy of Performing Arts in Bratislava, where he graduated as M.A. (2000), later as Art. Dr. (2006) and tenured associate professor in documentary film. In his professional career he filmed and produced many feature documentaries, many of which achieved a significant recognition at numerous festivals domestically and internationally. His filmmaking focuses on current social topics that cope with “traumatic” heritage of historical events in Central Europe in the 20th century. To name the few, he provides a critical insight into current situation of minorities at the edge of society in post-communist Slovakia (Black Word/Calo Lav, 1999), or explores the social and moral identity in the wake of the “capitalism” in former Eastern Bloc (Hey you Slovaks, 2002). His documentary Normalization/Kauza Cervanova, 2013 deals with the juridical crime.

The screenings and retrospective of his work include such venues as Anthology of Film Archives, New York, USA (2006), Columbia University, New York (2004) or New School University New York (USA), (1999).

Since 2002 he is a founder and CEO of atelier.doc Ltd., which was established as an independent production organization focusing primarily on production of documentary films and TV movies (www.atelierdoc.sk). One of its major projects is cultural chronicle Alternative archive which collects social and cultural events, memories, statements and a free series of social documentary films Film and society which Robert Kirchhoff is an author, producer and literary advisor.

Since 2003 he also participated as a producer or a co-producer on some of the most significant and awarded Slovak and Czech documentaries that gained national and international recognition. These include such titles as Disease of the Third power (dir. Zuzana Piussi), Made in Ash (dir. Iveta Grófová), Obscurantist and his lineage (dir. Karel Vachek). He also coproduced a documentary Blind Love (dir. Juraj Lehotsky), which was awarded by CICAE award at Cannes 2008.

In addition to his filmmaking career, Robert Kirchhoff holds an academic appointment of associate professor at the Academy of Performing Arts in Bratislava where he leads the course: the Directing of documentary film and Auteur documentary film. He also works as a lecturer of film courses at Summer Film School in his native Slovakia or in neighboring countries of Central Europe.

== Filmography ==
- Merry Christmas (1996)
- Recollection (1997)
- Loses and Return (1998)
- Black Word/Kálo lav (1999)
- Open windows (2000)
- Guest again the Grain (2000)
- You are my Sunshine (2000)
- On the Water (2001)
- Hey You Slovaks (2002)
- Flowers of the Evil (2003)
- Glamour and Misery (2005)
- Ghost in the Machine (2010)
- Normalization a. k. a. Kauza Cervanová (2013)

== TV projects ==
- Burian Women Day (2007–2008, script and director)
- Right for the People (2011, script and director)
- Thematical evening with UNICEF – Rights of the children (dramaturgy and script, 2002)
- Children News, TV series (dramaturgy, 2002)
- The Volunteers (dramaturgy, 2001)
- The Way for a dream (dramaturgy, 2004)
- Film and the society (2013), dramaturgy, producer
- Replay (2013, script and director)

== Producer ==
- Crying of Angels (2005, director Zuza Piussi)
- Blind loves (2008 – co-producer, director Juraj Lehotsky)
- Shelter story (2009, director Zuza Piussi)
- Disease of The Third Power (2011, director Zuza Piussi)
- Obscurantist and his lineage (2011, co-producer)
- Made in Ash (2012, co-producer)
- Film and the society (TV series) 2013

== Festivals screenings and awards ==
- Talent Prize, (1999), 34. annual IFF Academia Film Olomouc (CZ)
- Talent Prize, (2000), 35. annual IFF Academia Film Olomouc (CZ)
- 37th annual IDSFF Kraków (PL), 2000
- 16th annual IDFF Parnu (EST), 2000
- 6th annual IDFF Jihlava (CZ), 2002
- RELEASED! Ambiguous Freedom: The Iron Curtain Rises organised by Czech, Polish and Hungarian embassy in London, GB, 2002
- Visegrads fours /Hungarian culture centre CZ/ Praha, 2002
- 7th PUSAN International film festival (South Korea), 2002
- 10th Film Festival Palic, Croatia, 2003
- International Film Festival One World, ČR, 2003
- 39th annual IFF Karlovy Vary, ČR, 2003
- EU XXL film - Filmweek - 20. – 27. November 2003, Vienna, Austria
- CROSSING EUROPE Filmfestival Linz, Austria, 2004
- 7th Göttingen International Film Festival, Germany, 2004
- IGRIC, (2001), Annual prize for the best Slovak documentary of the year (SK)
- Slovak television prize (2002), 16 IFF Etnofilm Cadca.
- IDFF JiHlava, ČR, 2009
- ART Film, Trencianske Teplice, 2011
- CINEMATIC, Piestany, 2011
- IDFF Jihlava, 2011
- Best documentary prize winner, IFF CINEMATIC, Piestany (SK), 2013
- Warsaw INTERNATIONAL FILM FESTIVAL, best documentary nominee, (PL), 2013
- IDFF Jihlava, Special mention of the Jury, (CZ), 2013
- 56th International documentary festival Leipzig, Prize of the ecumenical Jury, (GR), 2013
- 56th International documentary festival Leipzig, Honorary mention, (Ger), 2013

== Self screenings and retrospectives ==
- American University Washington (USA), 1999
- New School University New York (USA), 1999
- Slovak Cultural Centre CZ, retrospective, Prague (CZ), 2002
- Embassy of Slovak Republic - Washington (USA), 2003
- 9th Annual World Convention of Association for the Study of Nationalities, Columbia University, New York, USA, 2004
- ERA NOWE HORIZONTY, Tesín, PL, 2005
- Anthology of Film Archives, New York, USA, 2006
