= Punto Fijo (disambiguation) =

Punto Fijo may refer to:

- Punto Fijo, city in Venezuela
- Puntofijo Pact, a formal arrangement arrived at between representatives of Venezuela's three main political parties in 1958
- Punto Fijo (album), 2003 album by Szidi Tobias
