= Let There Be Light (2019 film) =

2019 Slovak-language film

- Promotional release poster
- Directed by: Marko Skop
- Written by: Marko Skop; Frantisek Krähenbiel; Zuzana Liová
- Produced by: Jan Melis; Petr Oukropec; Marko Skop; Pavel Strnad
- Cinematography: Jan Melis
- Edited by: Frantisek Krähenbiel
- Music by: David Solař; Oskar Rózsa
- Production companies: Artileria; Ceská Televize; Negativ Film; Rozhlas a televízia Slovenska
- Distributed by: Asociace Ceských Filmových Klubu
- Release date: 30 June 2019 (Karlovy Vary International Film Festival)
- Running time: 93 minutes
- Countries: Slovakia; Czech Republic
- Languages: Slovak; German

Let There Be Light is a 2019 Slovak-Czech drama film directed by Marko Škop who co-wrote with Frantisek Krähenbiel & Zuzana Liová. The film is produced by Jan Melis, Petr Oukropec, Marko Škop, and Pavel Strnad. The film stars Frantisek Beles, Milan Ondrík, Dieter Fischer, and Ingrid Timková. It was selected as the Slovak entry for the Best International Feature Film at the 92nd Academy Awards, but it was not nominated.

== Plot ==
A Slovak man who works in Germany, soon learns that his son joined a paramilitary youth group, which was involved in the death of a classmate.

== Cast ==
- Frantisek Beles as Adam
- Milan Ondrík as Milan
- Dieter Fischer as Roman
- Ingrid Timková as Maid
- Ľubomír Paulovič as Grandfather

== Reception ==
=== Critical response ===
Richard Mowe of Eye For Film wrote, "Škop had made a series of award-winning documentaries before his feature début on Eva Nová, and now Let There Be Light confirms his talents as an assured director of actors and a director-writer of great economy and rigour.".The Prague Reporter wrote, "Holding together Let There Be Light is an especially empathetic lead performance from Ondrík: his Milan, at first presented as an irrepressibly cheerful character who just wants to do the right thing slowly has the positive outlook drained right out of him during the course of the movie.". Alissa Simon of Variety wrote, "The multilayered “Let There Be Light” is an earnest, relatable state-of-the-nation drama from helmer-writer Marko Škop that highlights xenophobia, religious hypocrisy and the rise of the extreme right in a small Slovak village.".

=== Accolades ===
Year	Award	Category	Result	Refs.
2019	Karlovy Vary International Film Festival	Best Actor	Won	
2019	Karlovy Vary International Film Festival	Award of Ecumenical Jury - Special Mention	Won	

== See also ==
- List of submissions to the 92nd Academy Awards for Best International Feature Film
- List of Slovak submissions for the Academy Award for Best International Feature Film
