= Timkov =

Timkov (Russian: Тимков) is a Russian masculine surname originating from the given name Timofey, its feminine counterpart is Timkova. It may refer to the following notable people:

- Ingrid Timková (born 1967), Slovak actress
- Nikolai Timkov (1912–1993), Russian painter
