= Stano Bubán =

Slovak artist, academic painter and university teacher

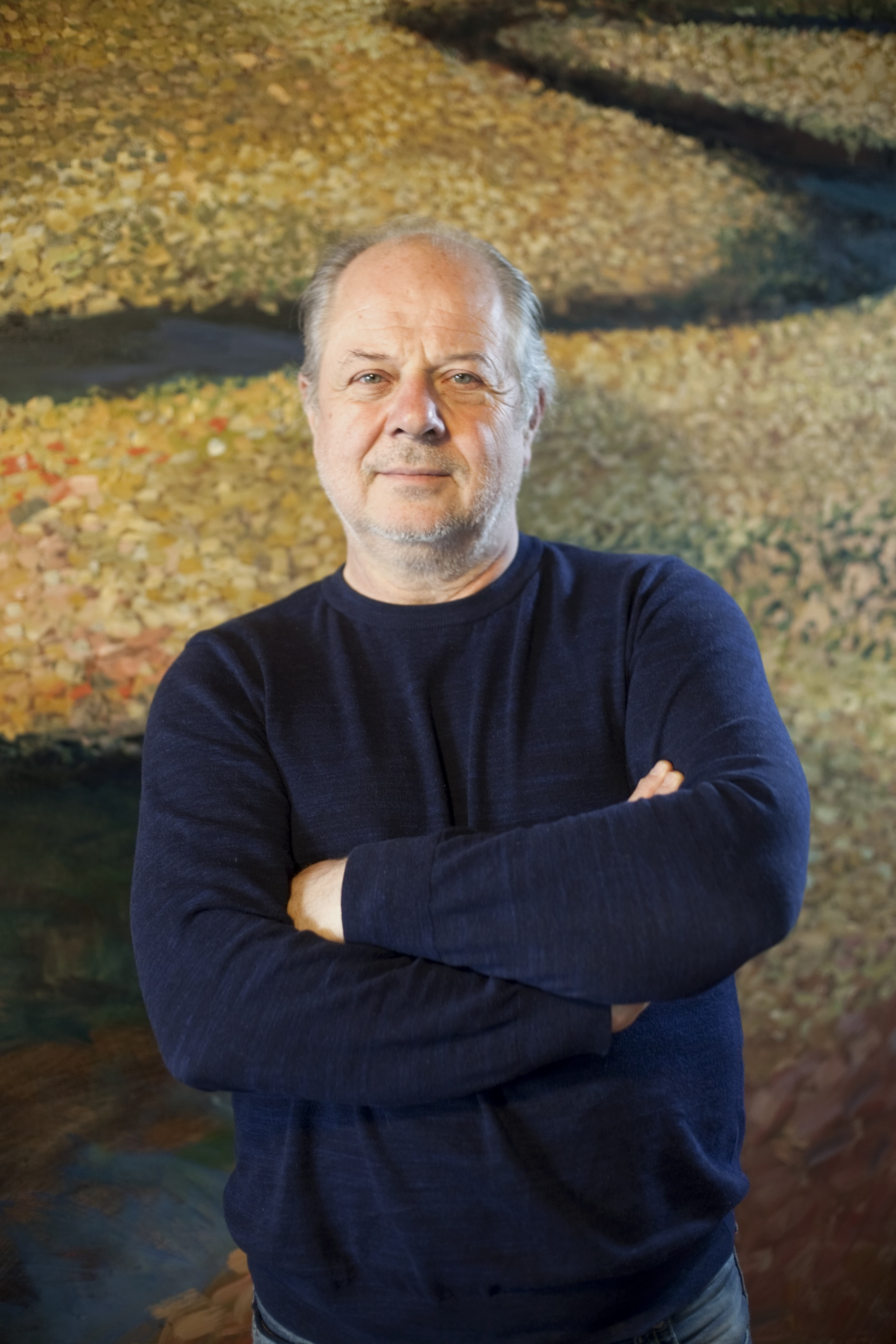
- Bubán in 2021
- Born: 5 May 1961 (age 65); Sečovce, Czechoslovakia
- Education: Academy of Fine Arts and Design, Bratislava
- Occupation: Painter
- Website: www.stanobuban.sk/en/en-bio//omne_sk.html

Stanislav Bubán (born 5 May 1961) is a Slovak artist, academic painter and university teacher. He is an associate professor at the Academy of Fine Arts in Bratislava.

== Early life and education ==
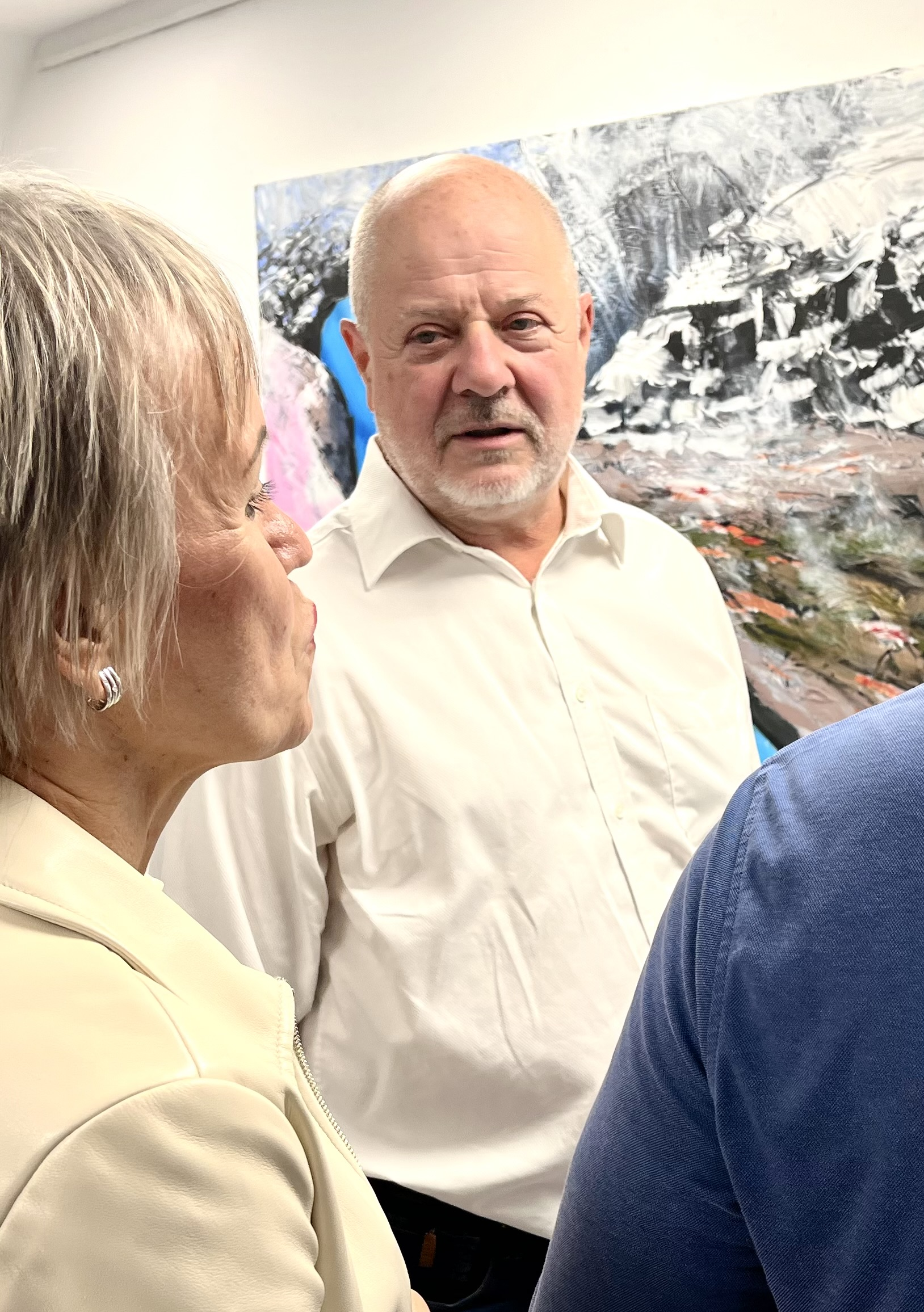
Stano Bubán, Slovak painter, Artotéka Gallery, Bratislava, 2024

He was born on 5 May 1961 in Sečovce into the family of painter Štefan Bubán and teacher Zlatica Bubánová (née Brindzáková).

After completing the habilitation process at the Academy of Fine Arts, Prague, he was appointed associate professor in 2002. He teaches in the drawing department at the Academy of Fine Arts and Design, Bratislava.

== Art career ==
Bubán began his work in the mid-1980s with an expressive postmodern painting style inspired by mythology.

In her monograph on the artist, Beata Jablonská writes:

Stano Bubán, in his early group exhibitions with the 'postmodern pirates,' which were perceived almost as manifesto performances, introduced tempera paintings on large papers. They stood out not so much for their clear association with transavantgarde poetics and its vocabulary but rather through their expressive, wild, and elemental painting style that naturally emerged from his painterly handwriting.

After the Velvet Revolution of 1989, he abandoned figuration and replaced expressionism with abstract monochrome surfaces intertwined with lines. He introduced a new aesthetic as well as an intellectual form of new abstraction to the chapter of Slovak art history.

His "indiscipline" did not prevent him from exploring all the possible structural elements of the painting (typical of non-representational approaches), thus laying the foundation for experiments mixing minimalist. It was precisely this "disobedience" that brought an authentic and decisive position to the context of contemporary Slovak painting within the framework of new abstraction.

Around 1998, he concluded his cycle of abstract painting and turned once again to realistic figurative composition, drawing from the techniques of the old masters. He combines traditional methods with distinctly new ones, creating a new (personal) "system" of painting. Beata Jablonská comments on this phase of his work:

His 'new' painting follows realistic objectives, even initially according to the demanding principles of old master techniques. Bubán's painting once again becomes painterly research and experimentation. The return to conventions of realistic painting is the turn of an artist well-versed in art history and contemporary interpretive theories.

Although the themes of his paintings are mythological, linked to literary "loves," the subjects seem to play a secondary role to the visual concept. The stylization of figures is the result of "thinking through painting," meaning that the reduction comes from brush techniques, with an emphasis on the impact of painterly gesture and expression.

=== Hasta la muerte, mi amor... ===
In 2018, Bubán presented a series of paintings on the theme of death at the Malá scéna STU theater, featuring the strong symbol of skulls. Human, animal, solitary skulls, or in pairs, function on the colorful surface of the paintings, sometimes matte and almost monochromatic, other times vividly bright. The skulls are depicted in both interior and exterior settings, but the most frequent environment is the forest or a decorative abstract background.

Barbara Brath, the curator of his exhibition Hasta la muerte, mi amor... characterized this period of his painting with the words:

Death is something that is inevitable. It will come one day. In life, the only certainty is death. And although we generally seek certainties in life, this single one invokes fear. Death sometimes comes unexpectedly, shockingly, quickly, and perhaps too soon; other times it drags on, people await it, even pray for it, as it may bring relief from life's pain. The theme of death is timeless; in a way, it both attracts and repels us because it is dangerously unexplored, unknown, something we do not understand and often fear precisely because of that.

=== The Seeking Pilgrim ===
In 2021, Bubán exhibited his collection The Walker at the Danubiana Gallery. Feelings of frustration, emptiness, and nothingness led him, along with artist Eva Šrubařová, to start painting outdoors in the Malé Karpaty region in November 2018. For a year, they hiked and painted the landscape once a week, no matter the weather. Whether it was snowing, raining, freezing, or scorching hot, they painted at night with headlamps, early in the morning, or during the magical twilight hour. This period resulted in Bubán's large-scale plein-air paintings. His landscape paintings reflect contemporary environmental issues, frustration with politics, and his own identity.

== Books about author ==
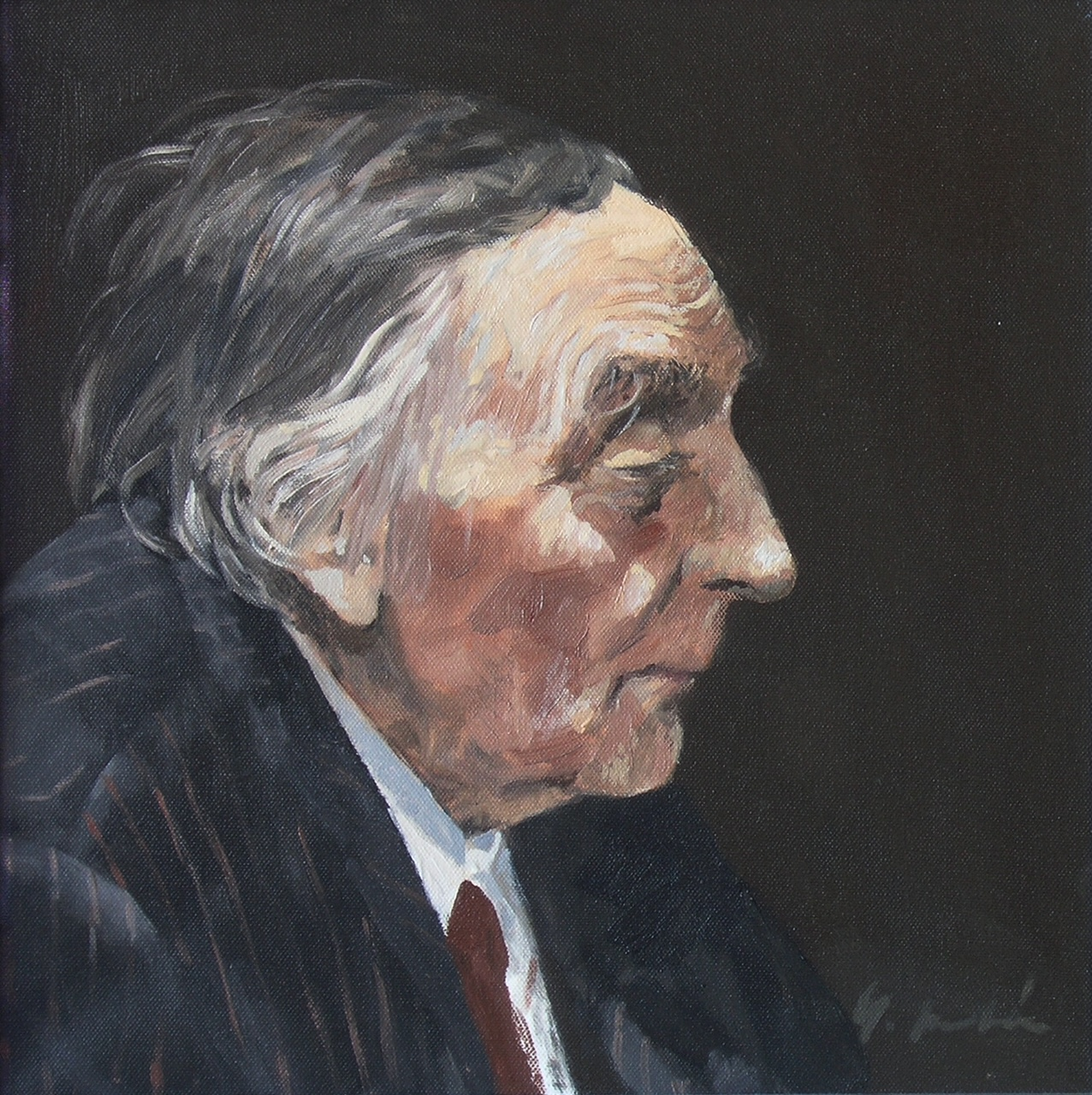

In 2000, the Slovak National Gallery (Bratislava) published a representative book titled Dejiny slovenského výtvarného umenia 20. storočie ('The History of Slovak Fine Art: The 20th Century'), which presents and analyzes the work of Stano Bubán. Nine years later, in 2009, the Slovak National Gallery released another publication, The Eighties: Postmodernism in Slovak Fine Art 1985–1992. The book was showcased at the Eighties exhibition held at the Esterházy Palace in Bratislava in 2009.

In 2013, the publishing house Virvar released the monograph Stano Bubán. In this publication, art theorist Beata Jablonská evaluates Bubán's work from its beginnings to the present. The author organized her reflections on the artist's paintings both chronologically and thematically. Several independent studies complement the full-color visual material, shedding light on the background of the creation of the works.

== Selected exhibitions ==
- 1992 Brunovský – Bubán, Sala communale Grifo e Leone, Perugia, Italy

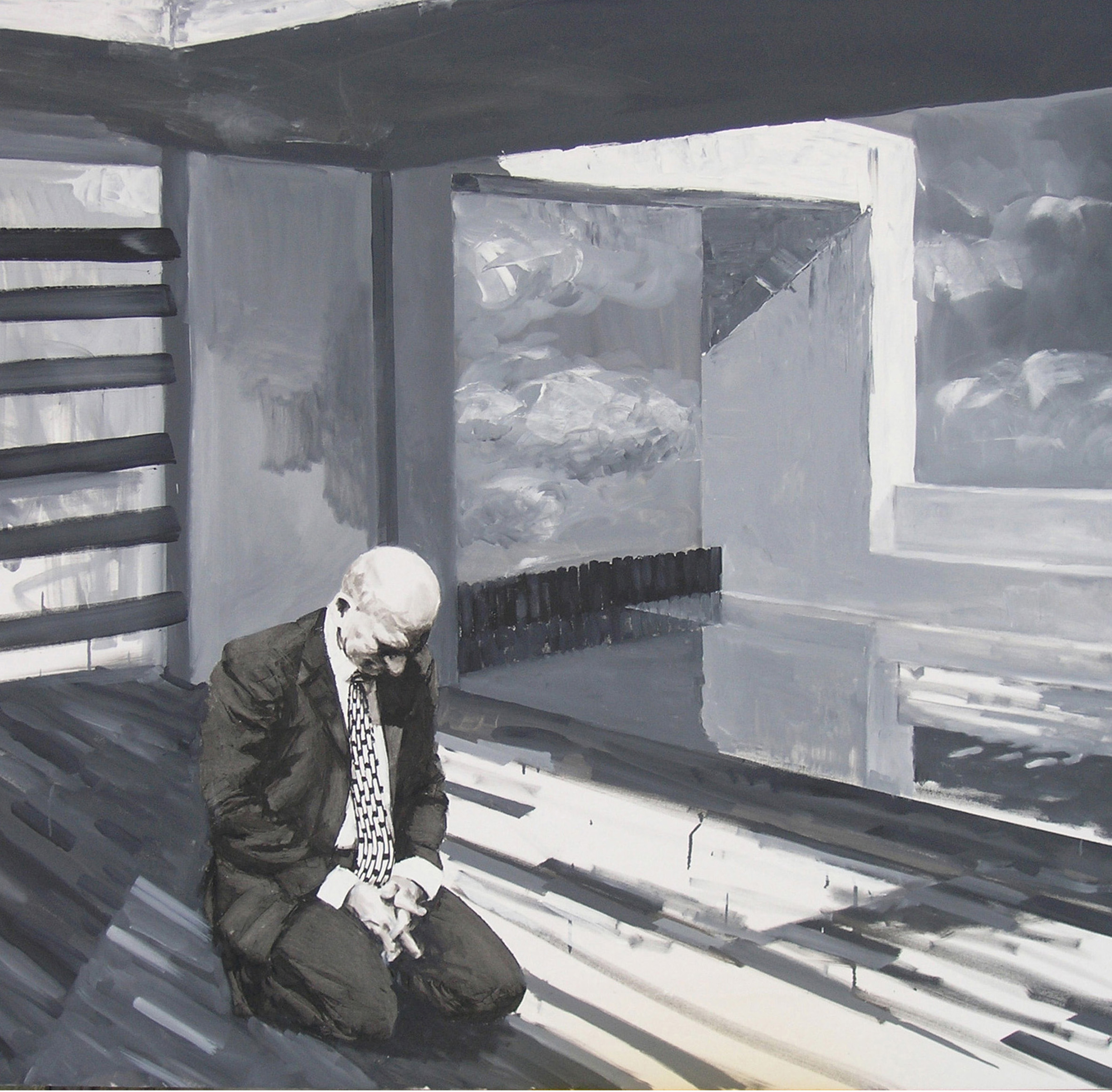

- 1993 Kunstpreis der Stadt Erfurt, Gallery am Fischmarkt, Erfurt, Germany
- 1994 5th International Cairo Biennal, Cairo, Egypt
- 1995 5+4 from Slovakia, The House of Cyprus, Athens, Greece
- 1996 XXVIII. Festival International de la Peinture, Cagnes-sur-Mer, France

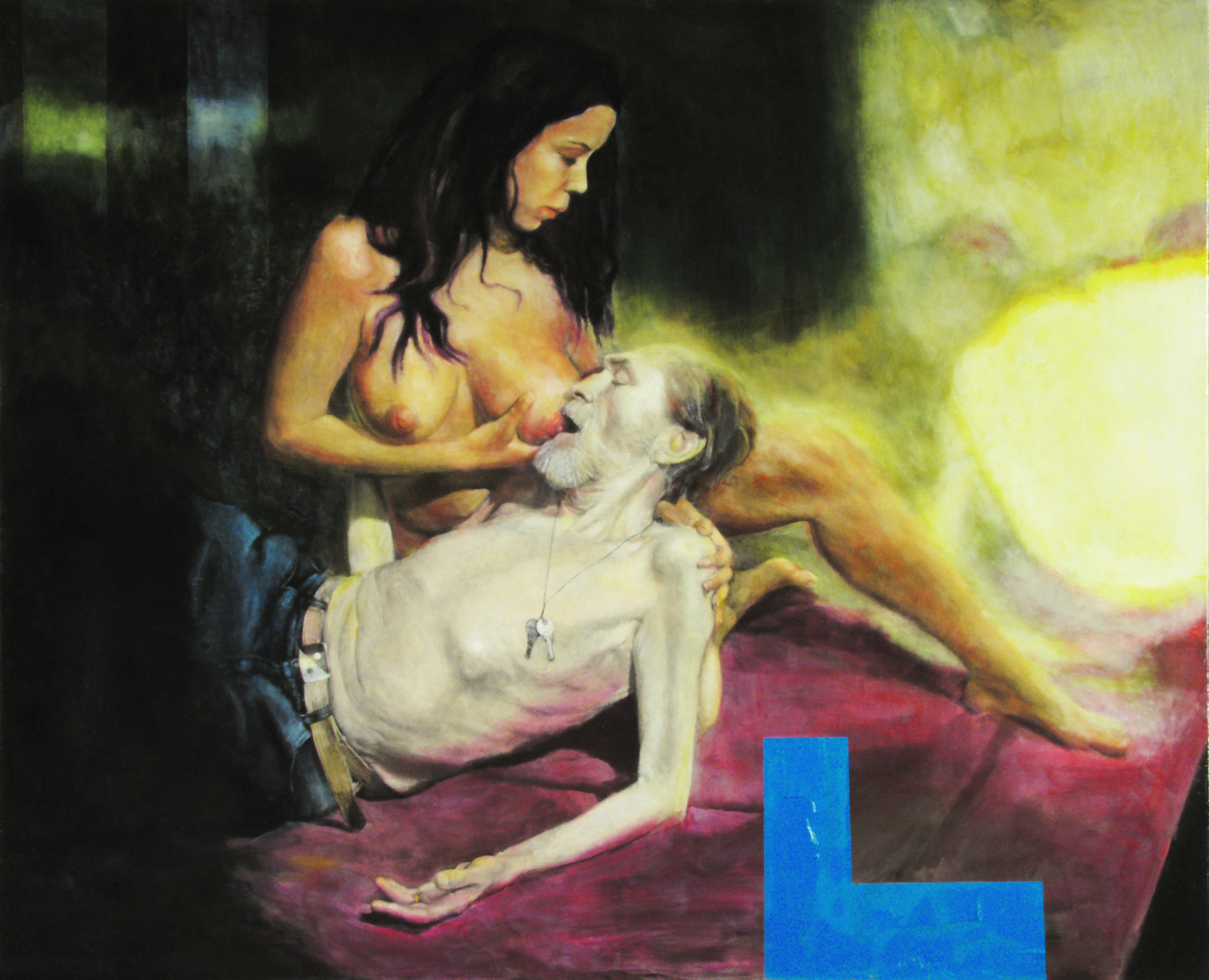

- 1997 Dordrecht – Bratislava, VBKD Gallery, Dordrecht, Netherlands
- 2000 Celjski mednarodní slikarski tedni, Keleia Gallery, Celje, Slovenia
- 2001 Eine kurze Geschichte zur Malerei (A Short History of Painting), Erholungshauses Bayer, Leverkusen, Germany
- 2002 New Paintings, Marat Art Gallery, Bratislava
- 2003 Masterpieces of the 20th Century from the collections of the Slovak National Gallery, Bratislava Castle, Bratislava

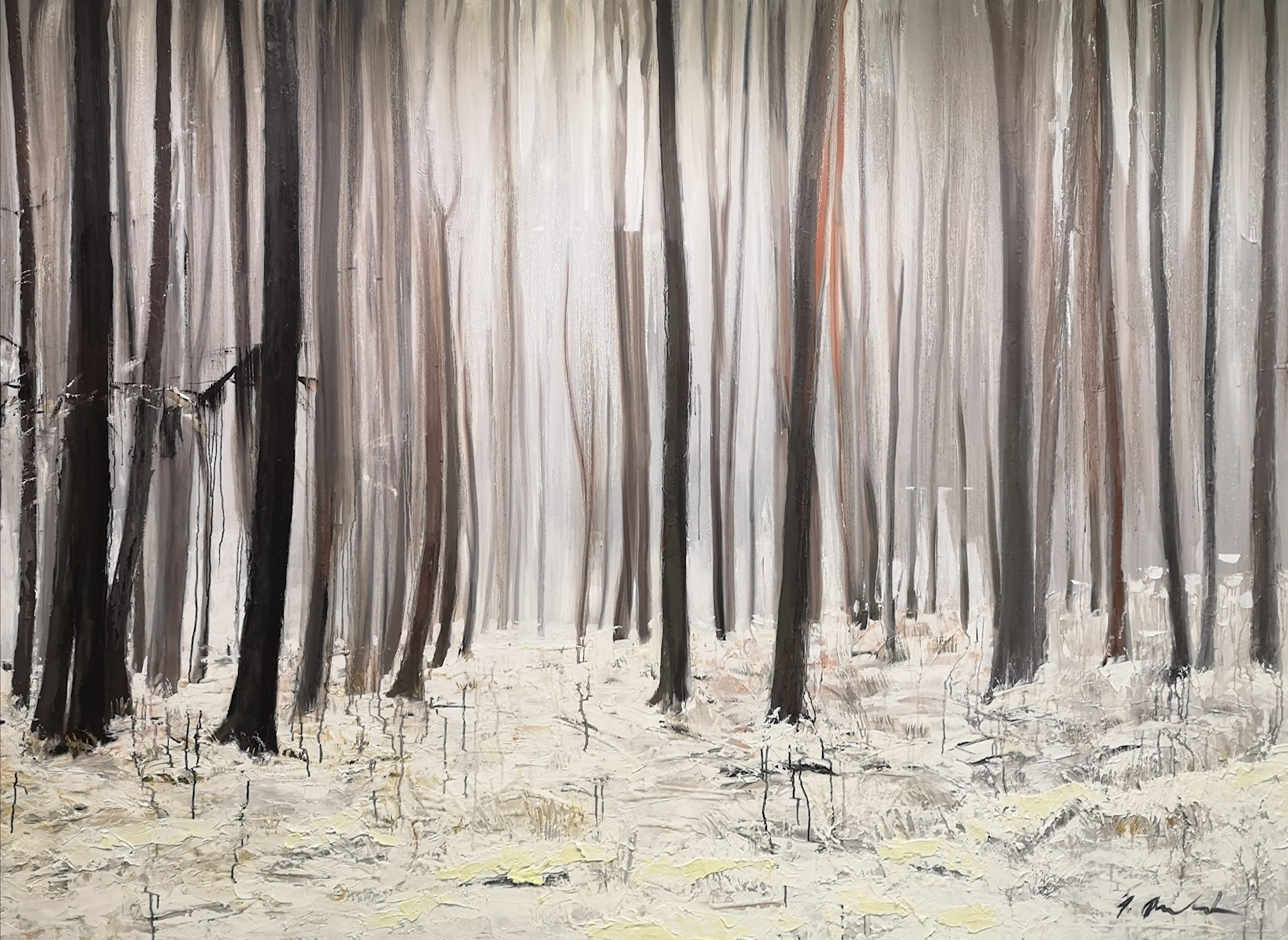

- 2005 Together in a Journey, Slovak Institute (together with Nena González Thayer), Budapest, Hungary and Vienna, Austria
- 2007 Together in a Journey (together with Nena González Thayer), Koloman Sokol Gallery, Washington, D.C., United States
- 2008 Kresling Gallery, Bratislava
- 2009 The 1980s: Postmodernism in Slovak Visual Arts
- 2011 L'art slovaque à la Cité internationale des Arts, Cité internationale des Arts, Paris, France
- 2013 BP Portrait Award, National Portrait Gallery, London, United Kingdom
- 2015 Time of the Bull, Artšrot Gallery, Bratislava
- 2016 Time of the Bull, J. Boljke Gallery, Ljubljana, Slovenia
- 2017 The 13th Chamber, ČinČin Gallery, Bratislava
- 2018 Hasta la muerte, mi amor (Until Death, My Love), Malá Scéna Theatre, Bratislava
- 2021 The Walker, Danubiana, Bratislava
- 2024 Phenomenon of Iceland, Artotéka Gallery, Bratislava
