= The Auschwitz Report =

2021 film

- Promotional release poster
- Slovak: Správa
- Directed by: Peter Bebjak
- Written by: Jozef Pastéka; Tomás Bombík; Peter Bebjak
- Produced by: Rast'o Sesták; Peter Bebjak
- Starring: Noel Czuczor; Peter Ondrejička; Jan Nedbal; Florian Panzner; Christoph Bach; Lars Rudolph; Wojciech Mecwaldowski; John Hannah
- Cinematography: Martin Žiaran
- Edited by: Marek Kráľovský
- Music by: Mario Schneider
- Production company: D.N.A. Production
- Distributed by: Samuel Goldwyn Films (United States); Beta Cinema (International)
- Release date: 28 January 2021 (Slovakia)
- Running time: 94 minutes
- Countries: Slovakia; Czech Republic; Poland; Germany
- Languages: Slovak; Czech; Polish; German; English

The Auschwitz Report, also known as The Auschwitz Escape (Slovak: Správa), is a 2021 historical drama war film directed by Peter Bebjak, who also co-wrote the script. It was selected as the Slovak entry for the Best International Feature Film at the 93rd Academy Awards, but it was not nominated. It is a co-production by Slovakia, the Czech Republic, Poland, and Germany.

== Plot ==
The film is based on the true story of Rudolf Vrba and Alfréd Wetzler, two prisoners at the Auschwitz concentration camp who manage to escape with details about the camp's operation including a label from a canister of the pesticide Zyklon-B, used in the murders there. Once across the border into Žilina, Slovakia, they are asked by the resistance to type up their recollections, which later become known as the Vrba–Wetzler report. The pair are eventually introduced to a representative from the Red Cross, who despite disbelief at their claims agrees to pass on the report to the Allies.

== Cast ==
- Noel Czuczor as Freddy
- Peter Ondrejička as Valér
- John Hannah as Warren
- Wojciech Mecwaldowski as Kozlowski
- Jacek Beler as Heršek
- Jan Nedbal as Pavel
- Christoph Bach as Schwarzhuber
- Florian Panzner as Lausmann
- Michal Režný as Marcel
- Kamil Nożyński as Juzek
- Aleksander Mincer as Kaczmarek
- Ksawery Szlenkier as Adamek
- Rebeka Poláková as Ibi

== Production ==
The film was directed by Peter Bebjak, and co-written by Bebjak, Jozef Pasteka, and Tomas Bombik. Cinematography is by Martin Ziaran.

It is a co-production by Slovakia, the Czech Republic, Poland, and Germany.

Inventive techniques were used in filming, such as using an upside-down camera to film some of the action, showing the audience how it was being viewed by the protagonists. Bleached colours are used, reflecting the soggy greyness of the mud.

== Release ==
The film was released as The Auschwitz Escape on video-on-demand in Ireland and the UK on 14 May 2021.

== Reception ==
Donald Clarke of The Irish Times gave the film 4 out of 5 stars, praising the script, and writes "Noel Czuczor and Peter Ondrejicka are models of restraint in the lead roles".

Leslie Felperin, writing in The Guardian, also gave it 4 stars, stating that the film is "intensely impactful". He writes that the "acting is extraordinary throughout, especially from the two leads", and "Bebjack has managed to make a film that relates this chapter of history in a new way, employing inventive cinematic techniques to present the material".

== Accolades ==
Správa was selected as the Slovak entry for the Best International Feature Film at the 93rd Academy Awards, but it was not nominated.

== See also ==
- Pilecki's Report, a report about the Auschwitz concentration camp written in 1943 by Witold Pilecki
- Vrba–Wetzler report
- List of submissions to the 93rd Academy Awards for Best International Feature Film
- List of Slovak submissions for the Academy Award for Best International Feature Film
