= Vánoční koleda =

EP by Szidi Tobias
- Released: November 2011
- Genre: World music; folk; jazz; chanson; ska
- Length: 22:43
- Label: Studio DVA (#MH01-2011)
- Producer: Michal Hrubý

Szidi Tobias chronology
Do vetra (2010)	Vánoční koleda (2011)	Ať se dobré děje (2011)

Vánoční koleda (Christmas Carol) is an EP by Slovak vocalist Szidi Tobias released on Studio DVA in 2011.

== Track listing ==
All lyrics are written by Peter Lipovský; all music is composed by Milan Vyskočáni

No.	Title	Notes	Length
1.	"Boží dvůr" (in Czech)	previously unreleased track	7:01
2.	"Městu i světu" (in Czech)	previously unreleased track	5:10
3.	"Dala som milému" (in Slovak)	taken from Do vetra	3:22
4.	"Bylobudenení" (in Czech)	taken from Pod obojím	4:07
5.	"Poď" (in Slovak)	taken from Do vetra	3:03
Total length:			22:43

== Credits and personnel ==
- Szidi Tobias – lead vocal
- Milan Vyskočáni – music
- Peter Lipovský – lyrics
- Michal Hrubý – producer
- Lucie Robinson – photography
