= Angel of Mercy (1993 film) =

1993 film

- Directed by: Miloslav Luther
- Written by: Miloslav Luther; Vladimír Körner
- Starring: Ingrid Timková
- Release date: 11 February 1993
- Running time: 95 minutes
- Country: Slovakia
- Language: Czech

Angel of Mercy (Czech: Andel milosrdenství) is a 1993 Slovak drama film directed by Miloslav Luther. The film was selected as the Slovak entry for the Best Foreign Language Film at the 67th Academy Awards, but was not accepted as a nominee.

== Cast ==
- Ingrid Timková as Anezka
- Juraj Simko as Krystof
- Josef Vajnar as Horecky
- Peter Simun as Fero
- Juraj Mokrý as Sylvio
- Marta Sládecková as Hilda

== See also ==
- List of submissions to the 67th Academy Awards for Best Foreign Language Film
- List of Slovak submissions for the Academy Award for Best Foreign Language Film
