= András Fáy =

Hungarian politician (1786–1864)

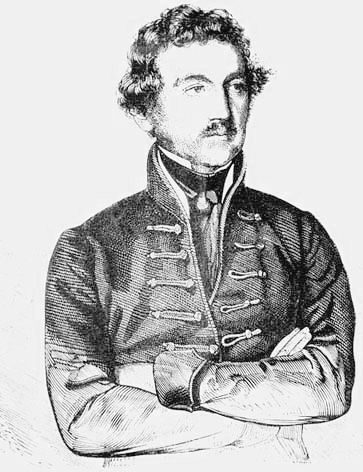
- Fáy in 1855
- Born: András Fáy; 30 May 1786; Kohány, Kingdom of Hungary (today as part of Sečovce, Slovakia)
- Died: 26 July 1864 (aged 78); Pest, Kingdom of Hungary
- Occupations: Poet, novelist, short story writer and playwright

András Fáy (Slovak: Andrej Fáy; 30 May 1786 – 26 July 1864) was a Hungarian author, lawyer, politician and businessman.

== Life ==
He was born at Kohány (today Kochanovce, suburb of Sečovce) in the county of Zemplén, and was educated for the law at the Protestant college of Sárospatak. His volume of poems New Garland (1818) established his fame as a poet. However he won a much larger fame with his Mesék (Fables), the first edition of which appeared at Vienna in 1820. This book exhibited his powers of satire and invention. These fables, which, on account of their originality and simplicity, caused Fay to be regarded as the Hungarian Aesop, were translated into German by Petz (Raab, 1825), and partly into English by E. D. Butler, Hungarian Poems and Fables (London, 1877).

Fay wrote numerous poems, the chief of which are to be found in the collections Bokréta (“Nosegay,” Pest, 1807), and Friss Bokréta (“Fresh Nosegay,” Pest, 1818). He also composed plays, romances and tales. Among his dramatic works are the tragedy, The Two Báthorys (1827); and several comedies, the most notable being The Old Coins; or the Transylvanians in Hungary (1824), and The Hunt in the Matra (1860). He wrote a social novel, The House of the Béltekys (1832); a humorous novel, Jávor orvos és szolgája, Bakator Ambrus (“Jávor the Doctor and his servant Ambrose Bakator,” Pest, 1855, 2 vols.); and a number of short stories. His earlier works were collected at Pest (1843–1844, 8 vols.).

In 1835 Fáy was elected to the Hungarian diet, and until the arrival of Lajos Kossuth in 1840 was the leader of the opposition party. After 1840, he took little part in politics. It is to him that the First Hungarian Savings Bank of Pest owes its origin, and he was one of the chief founders of the Hungarian National Theatre. He died in 1864.
