= Vášnivý bozk =

1995 Czecho-Slovak drama film

- Directed by: Miroslav Šindelka
- Screenplay by: Miroslav Šindelka; Ondrej Šulaj
- Produced by: Rudolf Biermann
- Starring: Jozef Kroner; Ivana Chýlková; Jiří Bartoška; Szidi Tobias
- Cinematography: Marek Jícha
- Edited by: Roman Varga
- Music by: Michal Kaščák
- Release date: January 28, 1995 (Slovakia)
- Running time: 87 minutes
- Countries: Slovakia; Czech Republic
- Languages: Slovak; Czech

Vášnivý bozk (also known as Vášnivý polibek; "Kiss of Passion") is a 1995 Czecho-Slovak psychological drama film starring Jozef Kroner, Ivana Chýlková, and Jiří Bartoška.

== Cast ==
- Ivana Chýlková as Hana
- Jiří Bartoška as Igor
- Szidi Tobias as Blanka
- Jozef Kroner as Schneider
- Matej Landl as Viktor
- Roman Luknár as Lajko
- Andrej Hryc as Mário
- Katarína Kolníková as grandmother
- Ján Mildner as grandfather

=== Additional credits ===
- František Lipták - art director
- Katarína Hollá - costume designer
- Michal Holubec - sound
- Petr Dvořák - electrician
- Juraj Solan - score mix

== See also ==
- List of Slovak submissions for the Academy Award for Best Foreign Language Film
