= Ať se dobré děje =

Studio album by Szidi Tobias
- Released: November 21, 2011
- Genre: World music; folk; jazz; chanson; ska
- Length: 45:59
- Label: Studio DVA
- Producer: Michal Hrubý

Szidi Tobias chronology
Vánoční koleda (2011)	Ať se dobré děje (2011)	Jolanka (2014)

Ať se dobré děje (Whatever happens, Come the Good) is the fifth studio album by Slovak vocalist Szidi Tobias released on Studio DVA in 2011.

== Track listing ==
All lyrics are written by Peter Lipovský; all music is composed by Milan Vyskočáni, except for "Brehy" (Lipanský and Slavo Solovic)

No.	Title	Notes	Length
1.	"Andělé" (in Czech)	taken from musical theatre Vánoční koleda	7:04
2.	"Ať se dobré děje" (in Czech)	taken from musical theatre Vánoční koleda	4:45
3.	"Zimní noci" (in Czech)	taken from musical theatre Vánoční koleda	3:34
4.	"Tabák, pilka" (in Czech)		3:49
5.	"Brehy" (in Slovak)	acoustic version of the main theme of Apricot Island	4:21
6.	"Tichá noc" (in Slovak)		3:52
7.	"V domě" (in Czech)	taken from musical theatre Vánoční koleda	5:58
8.	"Vrána" (in Czech)		3:38
9.	"V listí" (in Slovak)		3:53
10.	"Já bdím" (in Czech)	taken from musical theatre Vánoční koleda	5:05
Total length:			45:59

== Credits and personnel ==
- Szidi Tobias - lead vocal
- Milan Vyskočáni - music
- Peter Lipovský - lyrics
- Martin Gašpar - guitar
- Martina Zajko - guitar
- Marcel Buntaj - drums
- Andrej Szabo - percussion
- Michal Hrubý - producer
- Pavla Hodková - photography

== Charts ==
Chart (2011)	Peak position
Czech Albums Chart	23
