= Flood (2025 film) =

2025 film by Martin Gonda

- Slovak: Potopa
- Directed by: Martin Gonda
- Screenplay by: Martin Gonda; Martin Šuster; Dominika Udvorková
- Produced by: Tomáš Gič; Katarína Krnáčová; Viktor Schwarz; Henry Gillet; Izabela Igel
- Starring: Sára Chripáková; Jozef Pantlikáš; Vladimír Čema; Katarína Babejová
- Cinematography: Oliver Záhlava
- Edited by: Pawel Laskowski
- Music by: Théophile Moussouni
- Production companies: Silverart; Cineart TV Prague; Harine Films; Y-House Films
- Distributed by: Continental film
- Release dates: 7 November 2025 (Mar del Plata); 4 December 2025 (Slovakia)
- Running time: 102 minutes
- Countries: Slovakia; Czech Republic; Poland; Belgium
- Languages: Rusyn; Slovak

Flood (Slovak: Potopa) is a 2025 historical drama film directed and co-written by Martin Gonda in his feature directorial debut. It is the first fictional feature film in the Rusyn language, depicting the displacement of the Rusyn people due to the construction of the Starina reservoir.

The film had its world premiere at the 40th Mar del Plata International Film Festival on 7 November 2025. It was selected as the Slovak entry for the Best International Feature Film at the 99th Academy Awards.

== Premise ==
The film is set in 1980 in the village of Ruské, whose Rusyn inhabitants are due to be resettled to make way for the construction of the Starina reservoir. Mara, a fifteen-year-old girl, intends to leave the village to become a pilot, despite her father's opposition.

== Cast ==
- Sára Chripáková as Mara
- Jozef Pantlikáš as Alexander, Mara's father
- Vladimír Čema as Orthodox priest
- Katarína Babejová as Kata, Mara's friend
- Cyril Drozda
- Igor Latta
- Jevgenij Libezňuk
- Stanislav Pitoňák
- Michal Soltész
- Světlana Škovranová
- Vladimíra Štefániková

== Production ==
Development of the film began in 2019. It features a cast comprising mainly actors from the Alexander Duchnovič Theatre and non-professional actors. Principal photography took place in September and October 2023 in north-eastern Slovakia, in Medzilaborce, Čertižné, Snina, Humenné and Košice.

== Release ==
Flood had its world premiere at the 40th Mar del Plata International Film Festival on 7 November 2025, competing for the Golden Ástor. The film was featured in the Cinema of the World section of the 56th International Film Festival of India on 23 November 2025.

Following its international festival screenings, a series of preview screenings took place in eastern Slovakia. It was released in Slovak theaters on 4 December 2025.

== Reception ==
Martin Kudláč writing in Cineuropa noted that Gonda "departs from the dominant local approaches to communist-era stories, which often rely on nostalgia or depictions of oppression" and that Oliver Záhlava’s cinematography "avoids the stylisation typically associated with period films, opting instead for a more naturalistic depiction". Natalia Małecka-Nowak of Rusyn portal Lem described the film as one that "pins you to your seat", adding that "there is silence, tension and rawness here".

Several reviewers compared Flood to Katarína Gramatová's directorial debut Promise, I'll Be Fine.

=== Accolades ===
Award / Film Festival	Date of ceremony	Category	Recipient(s)	Result	Ref.
Febiofest Bratislava Industry Days	30 March 2021	Best Febio Pitch Award	Flood	Won	
Mar del Plata International Film Festival	15 November 2025	Golden Ástor	Flood	Nominated	
Mar del Plata International Film Festival	15 November 2025	SIGNIS Award	Flood	Won	
Sun in a Net Awards	9 April 2026	Best Feature Film	Flood	Nominated	
Sun in a Net Awards	9 April 2026	Best Director	Martin Gonda	Nominated	
Sun in a Net Awards	9 April 2026	Best Screenplay	Martin Gonda, Martin Šuster and Dominika Udvorková	Won	
Sun in a Net Awards	9 April 2026	Best Actress in Leading Role	Sára Chripáková	Won	
Sun in a Net Awards	9 April 2026	Best Supporting Actor	Vladimír Čema	Won	
Sun in a Net Awards	9 April 2026	Best Sound	Bohumil Martinák, Ivan Ďurkech, Quentin Colette and Renaud Guillamin	Won	
Sun in a Net Awards	9 April 2026	Best Stage Design	Juraj Kuchárek	Won	
Sun in a Net Awards	9 April 2026	Best Costumes	Tatiana Figurová	Nominated	
Sun in a Net Awards	9 April 2026	Best Visual Effects	Tibor Meliš and Tomáš Srovnal	Nominated	
Sun in a Net Awards	9 April 2026	Audience Award	Flood	Won	
Zlín Film Festival	3 June 2026	Special Jury Award for a Feature Film in the Junior and Youth Category	Flood	Won	

== See also ==
- List of submissions to the 99th Academy Awards for Best International Feature Film
- List of Slovak submissions for the Academy Award for Best International Feature Film
