= Let asfaltového holuba =

- Directed by: Vladimír Balco
- Screenplay by: Vladimír Balco; Milan Frolo
- Produced by: Ivan Filus
- Starring: Ondřej Vetchý; Szidi Tobias; Roman Luknár; György Cserhalmi
- Cinematography: Ladislav Kraus
- Edited by: Dušan Milko
- Music by: Vladimír Godár
- Production company: SFT Koliba
- Distributed by: SFT Koliba
- Release date: April 17, 1991 (Slovakia)
- Running time: 90 minutes
- Country: Czechoslovakia
- Language: Slovak

Let asfaltového holuba ("Fly of the Asphalt Pigeon") is a 1991 Czechoslovak psychodrama, starring Ondřej Vetchý, Szidi Tobias, Roman Luknár and György Cserhalmi.

The movie directed by Vladimír Balco, brought Vetchý the Golden Nail at the 29th Festival československého filmu as Best Actor in Leading Role. While Vladimír Godár won the award in the Film score category.

== Cast ==
- Ondřej Vetchý as Dodo
- Szidi Tobias as Milena
- Roman Luknár as Zdeno
- György Cserhalmi as Dodo's father
- Alena Procházková as Dodo's mother
- František Velecký as Fraňo
- Branislav Polák as Kysela
- Vladimír Hajdu as Young man
- Milena Dvorská as Poláková
- Janko Kroner as Dodo (voice role)
- Štefan Kožka as Dodo's father (voice role)

=== Additional credits ===
- Ján Svoboda – art director
- Mária Šilberská – costume designer
- Bohumil Martinák – sound
- Peter Breiner – conductor
- Juraj Solan – score mix
- Zuzana Tatarová – script editor

== Awards ==
Year	Nomination	Award	Category	Result
1991	Ondřej Vetchý	Festival československého filmu Golden Nail	Actor in Leading Role	Won
1991	Vladimír Godár	Festival československého filmu Golden Nail	Film score	Won

== See also ==
- List of Slovak submissions for the Academy Award for Best Foreign Language Film
