= Eva Nová =

2015 Slovak-Czech film directed by Marko Škop

- International theatrical release poster
- Directed by: Marko Škop
- Written by: Marko Škop
- Produced by: Jan Melis; Marko Skop
- Starring: Emília Vášáryová
- Cinematography: Jan Melis
- Edited by: Frantisek Krähenbiel; Marina Andree Skop
- Production companies: Artileria; Sirius Films
- Release date: 11 September 2015 (TIFF)
- Running time: 106 minutes
- Countries: Slovakia; Czech Republic
- Language: Slovak

Eva Nová is a 2015 Slovak-Czech drama film written, directed and co-produced by Marko Škop. It was screened in the Discovery section of the 2015 Toronto International Film Festival where it won the FIPRESCI Prize. It was selected as the Slovak entry for the Best Foreign Language Film at the 89th Academy Awards but it was not nominated.

== Cast ==
- Emília Vášáryová as Eva Nová
- Milan Ondrík as Ďoďo
- Anikó Varga as Helena
- Gabriela Dzuríková as vedoucí supermarketu

== Awards ==
Year	Recipient	Award	Category	Result
2015	Marko Škop	TIFF Awards	FIPRESCI Prize for the Discovery	Won
2014-2015	Marko Škop	The Sun in Net Awards (Slnko v sieti)	Best Screenplay	Won
2014-2015	Marko Škop	The Sun in Net Awards (Slnko v sieti)	Best Director	Won
2014-2015	Eva Nová	The Sun in Net Awards (Slnko v sieti)	Best Movie	Won
2014-2015	Emília Vášáryová	The Sun in Net Awards (Slnko v sieti)	Best Actress in Leading Role	Won
2014-2015	Milan Ondrík	The Sun in Net Awards (Slnko v sieti)	Best Actor in Leading Role	Won
2014-2015	Ján Meliš	The Sun in Net Awards (Slnko v sieti)	Best Cinematographer	Nominated
2014-2015	František Krähenbiel	The Sun in Net Awards (Slnko v sieti)	Best Editor	Nominated
2014-2015	Jan Čeněk • Ján Ravasz • Milan Sirkovský	The Sun in Net Awards (Slnko v sieti)	Best Sound	Nominated
2014-2015	Erika Gadus	The Sun in Net Awards (Slnko v sieti)	Best Costumes or Make-up Artist	Nominated

== See also ==
- List of submissions to the 89th Academy Awards for Best Foreign Language Film
- List of Slovak submissions for the Academy Award for Best Foreign Language Film
