= The Border (2009 film) =

2009 film

- Film poster
- Directed by: Jaroslav Vojtek
- Written by: Jaroslav Vojtek; Marek Lescák
- Produced by: Mario Homolka
- Cinematography: Tomas Stanek
- Release date: 28 October 2009 (Jihlava International Documentary Film Festival)
- Running time: 72 minutes
- Country: Slovakia
- Languages: Slovak; Hungarian

The Border (Slovak: Hranica) is a 2009 Slovak documentary film directed by Jaroslav Vojtek. The film was selected as the Slovak entry for the Best Foreign Language Film at the 83rd Academy Awards but did not make the final shortlist.

== See also ==
- List of submissions to the 83rd Academy Awards for Best Foreign Language Film
- List of Slovak submissions for the Academy Award for Best Foreign Language Film
