= Sečovce =

Sečovce Gálszécs
- Municipality
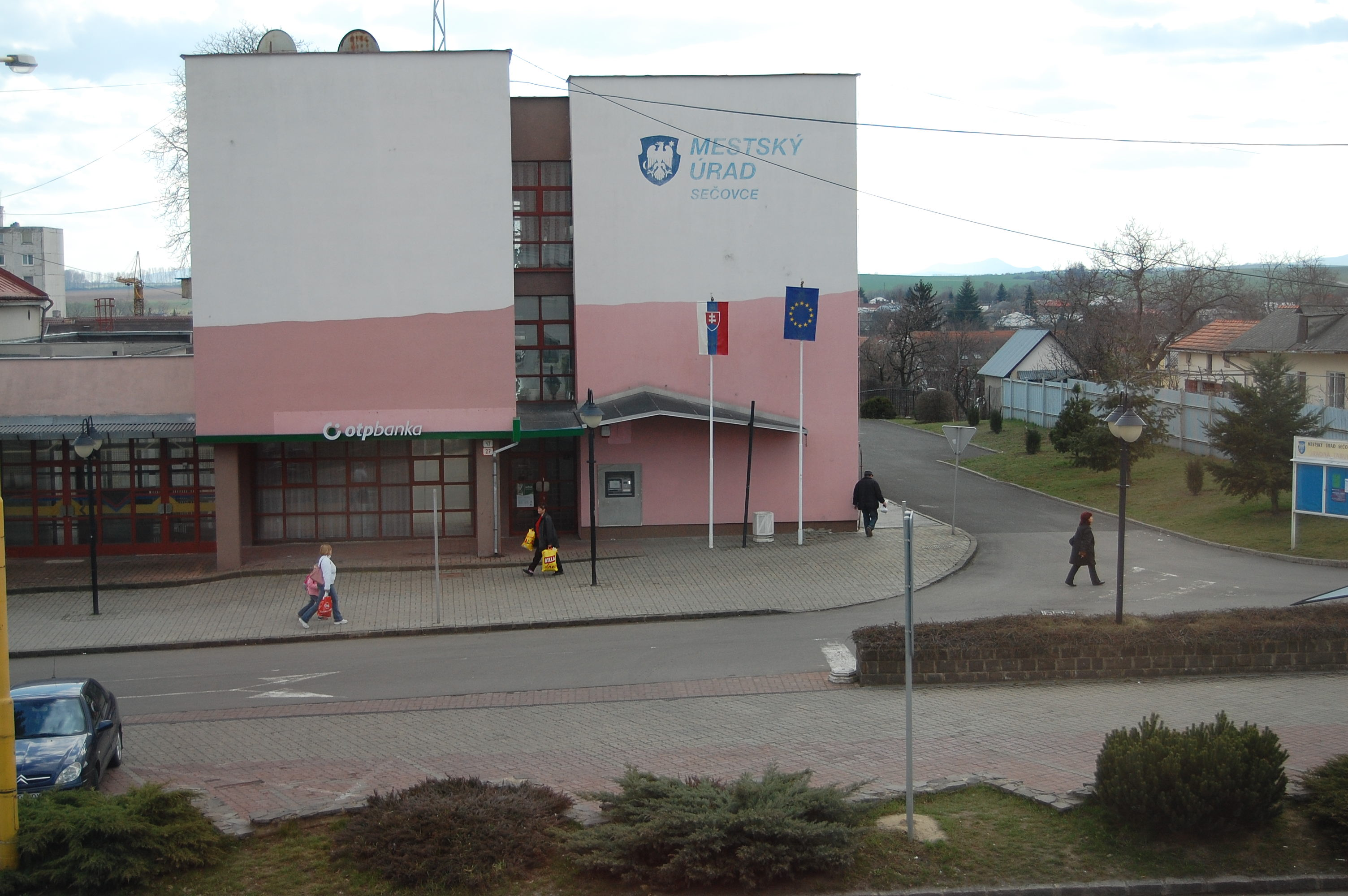
- Sečovce Town Hall

- Flag Coat of arms

- Location of Sečovce in the Košice Region Location of Sečovce in Slovakia
- Coordinates: 48.70°N 21.66°E
- Country: Slovakia
- Region: Košice Region
- District: Trebišov District
- First mentioned: 1255

Area
  - Total: 32.65 km^{2} (12.61 sq mi)
- Elevation: 136 m (446 ft)

Population (2025)
  - Total: 8,509
- Time zone: UTC+1 (CET)
  - Summer (DST): UTC+2 (CEST)
- Postal code: 780 1
- Area code: +421 56
- Vehicle registration plate (until 2022): TV
- Website: www.secovce.sk

Sečovce (Slovak pronunciation: [ˈsetʂɔwtse]; Hungarian: Gálszécs; Ukrainian: Сечівці) is a town in the Trebišov District in the Košice Region of south-eastern Slovakia.

== History ==
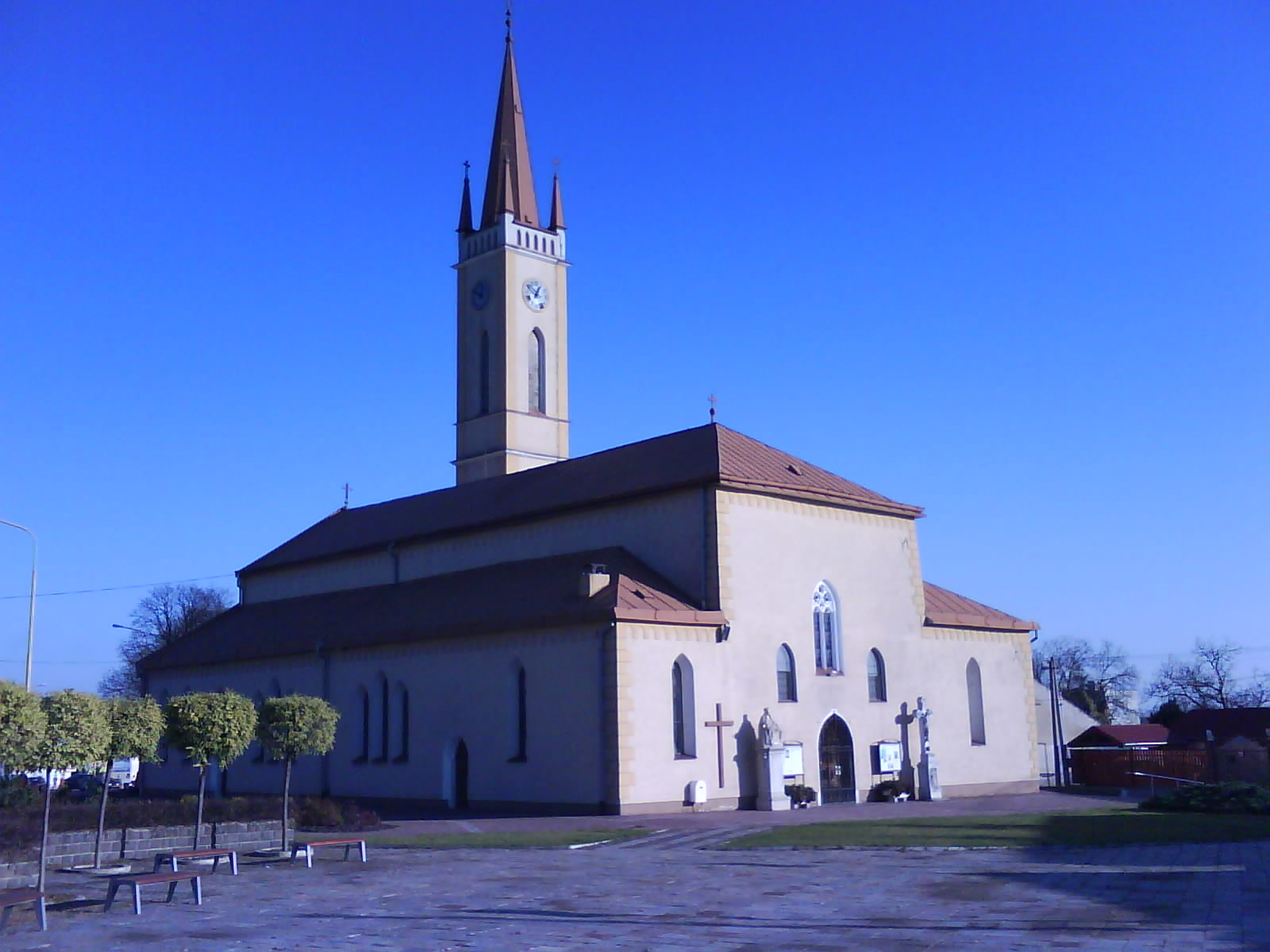
Roman Catholic Church of The Assumption

The town was first mentioned in year 1255 on the list of king Béla IV of Hungary. In 1494, a Roman Catholic church was built in the Gothic architecture style. Since the 15th century, there was gradual development of trade, including markets with shoemakers, saddlers, potters and furriers. The first post-office was opened in 1783, telegraph office in 1868, telephone office in 1890, train station in 1904, and museum in 1954, which was moved to Trebišov in 1981.

== Geography ==
The municipality lies at an altitude of 136 metres (446 ft) and covers an area of 32.65 km^{2} (12.61 sq mi) (2025).

== Population ==
Historical population
Year	Pop.	±%
1970	5,776	—
1980	6,145	+6.4%
1991	6,705	+9.1%
2001	7,819	+16.6%
2011	8,236	+5.3%
2021	8,526	+3.5%
Source: Censuses

Population statistic (10 years)
Year	1995	2005	2015	2025
Count	7430	7945	8399	8509
Difference		+6.93%	+5.71%	+1.30%

Population statistic
Year	2024	2025
Count	8538	8509
Difference		−0.33%

It has a population of 8509 people (31 December 2025).

=== Ethnicity ===
Census 2021 (1+%)
Ethnicity	Number	Fraction
Slovak	7762	91.03%
Romani	1458	17.1%
Not found out	476	5.58%
Total	8526	

In year 2021 was 8526 people by ethnicity 7762 as Slovak, 1458 as Romani, 476 as Not found out, 51 as Rusyn, 43 as Czech, 25 as Other, 23 as Hungarian, 16 as Ukrainian, 9 as Russian, 8 as Vietnamese, 4 as German, 3 as Polish, 2 as Irish, 2 as Austrian, 1 as Serbian, 1 as Moravian, 1 as Croatian and 1 as English.

Note on population: The difference values of population numbers in the table "Population statistic" and in the sections "Ethnicity" & "Religion" is caused by the use of various statistical methods.

=== Religion ===
Census 2021 (1+%)
Religion	Number	Fraction
Roman Catholic Church	3743	43.9%
Greek Catholic Church	1820	21.35%
None	1736	20.36%
Not found out	589	6.91%
Evangelical Church	160	1.88%
Calvinist Church	139	1.63%
Other	123	1.44%
Apostolic Church	99	1.16%
Total	8526	

In year 2021 was 8526 people by religion 3743 from Roman Catholic Church, 1820 from Greek Catholic Church, 1736 from None, 589 from Not found out, 160 from Evangelical Church, 139 from Calvinist Church, 123 from Other, 99 from Apostolic Church, 33 from Eastern Orthodox Church, 33 from Jehovah's Witnesses, 17 from Ad hoc movements, 13 from Christian Congregations in Slovakia, 5 from Other and not ascertained christian church, 3 from Jewish community, 3 from Islam, 3 from Church of the Brethren, 3 from Buddhism, 1 from Old Catholic Church, 1 from Paganism and natural spirituality, 1 from Hinduism and 1 from United Methodist Church.

== Economy ==
A few factories reside in and around Sečovce - Palma Agro (vegetable oils), Silometal (metal silos and containers), Sonap (clothing), Valter (socks), Lesy SR (wood processing), and Simkovic-Protektor s.r.o./SPR Retreading Solutions (tire retreads)

== Famous people ==
- Štefan Sečovský (16th century), evangelical preacher, writer, composer, pedagogue. His original Hungarian name was Galszecsi Istvan.
- Štefan Gáboréczy (16th century), evangelical writer
- Andrej Fáy (1786 – 1864), lawyer, businessman, politician, writer, playwright
- Emery Roth (1871 – 1948), architect
- Jozef Švagrovský (1921 – 1985), paleontologist, university professor
- Gejza Šimanský (1924 – 2007), football player
- Stano Bubán (1961), painter, associate professor, Academy of Fine Arts in Bratislava
- Ingrid Timková (1967), actress and director
- Adolf Schwarz (1836), Hungarian-Jewish chess player
