= A Step into the Dark =

2014 film

- Film poster
- Directed by: Miloslav Luther
- Written by: Miloslav Luther
- Starring: Marko Igonda
- Release date: 12 June 2014
- Running time: 90 minutes
- Country: Slovakia
- Language: Slovak

A Step into the Dark (Slovak: Krok do tmy) is a 2014 Slovak drama film directed by Miloslav Luther. It was selected as the Slovak entry for the Best Foreign Language Film at the 87th Academy Awards, but was not nominated.

== Cast ==
- Marko Igonda
- Kristýna Boková
- Miroslav Donutil
- Boris Farkas
- Marián Geišberg
- Monika Haasová
- Vladimír Hajdu
- Lucia Jasková
- Attila Mokos
- Peter Nádasdi

== See also ==
- List of submissions to the 87th Academy Awards for Best Foreign Language Film
- List of Slovak submissions for the Academy Award for Best Foreign Language Film
