= Divý mak =

Studio album by Szidi Tobias
- Released: 2001
- Genre: World music, folk, jazz, chanson, ska
- Length: 42:36
- Label: BMG Ariola (#74321 84289 2); Studio DVA (#MH01-2009) - re-release

Szidi Tobias chronology
Divý mak (2001)	Punto Fijo (2003)

Divý mak (Wild Poppy) is the debut album by Slovak vocalist Szidi Tobias released on BMG Ariola in 2001.

== Track listing ==
All music is composed by Milan Vyskočáni

No.	Title	Lyrics	Length
1.	"Každý hľadá svoje miesto"	Peter Lipovský	3:42
2.	"Ráno"	Maroš Bančej	2:59
3.	"Obrázky o láske"	Peter Lipovský	4:34
4.	"Príbeh z roku Páně"	Peter Lipovský	4:12
5.	"Idylka"	Peter Lipovský	4:33
6.	"Miluj ma"	Peter Lipovský	5:06
7.	"O verande"	Peter Lipovský	3:13
8.	"Vzducho-plavec"	Peter Lipovský	3:38
9.	"Večer"	Peter Lipovský	3:27
10.	"Jeseň na draka"	Peter Lipovský	3:09
11.	"Po polnoci v júli"	Peter Lipovský	4:03
Total length:			42:36

Notes

- All songs performed in Slovak.

== Credits and personnel ==
- Szidi Tobias - lead vocal
- Milan Vyskočáni - music
- Peter Lipovský - lyrics
- Maroš Bančej - lyrics
