= Made in Ash =

2012 film

- Directed by: Iveta Grófová
- Written by: Marek Lescák; Iveta Grófová
- Starring: Dorotka Billa
- Cinematography: Viera Bacikova
- Release date: 29 June 2012
- Running time: 84 minutes
- Countries: Slovakia; Czech Republic
- Languages: Slovak; Czech; German

Made in Ash (Slovak: Až do mesta Aš) is a 2012 Slovak-Czech drama film directed by Iveta Grófová. The film was selected as the Slovak entry for the Best Foreign Language Oscar at the 85th Academy Awards, but did not make the final shortlist.

== Cast ==
- Dorotka Billa as Dorotka
- Maria Billa
- Jarka Bucincova
- Silvia Halusicova
- Robin Schmidt

== See also ==
- List of submissions to the 85th Academy Awards for Best Foreign Language Film
- List of Slovak submissions for the Academy Award for Best Foreign Language Film
