= Apricot Island =

- Slovak: Marhuľový ostrov
- Directed by: Peter Bebjak
- Written by: Peter Lipovský
- Produced by: Peter Bebjak; Rastislav Šesták
- Starring: Szidi Tobias; Attila Mokos; Peter Nádasdy; György Cserhalmi
- Cinematography: Martin Žiaran
- Edited by: Ondrej Azor
- Music by: Juraj Dobrakov; Tamás Szarka
- Production company: DNA Production
- Distributed by: Film Europe
- Release date: April 14, 2011 (Slovakia)
- Running time: 102 minutes
- Country: Slovakia
- Languages: Slovak, Hungarian
- Budget: €1,200,000 (estimated)

Apricot Island (Slovak: Marhuľový ostrov) is a 2011 Slovak drama-romance, starring Szidi Tobias.

The movie distributed by Film Europe, was directed by Peter Bebjak, while produced in common with Rastislav Šesták for their DNA Production company.

At the 19th Třinecké filmové babí léto, the work won Audience Award as the Best Debut Feature Film in September 2011. The same year, the film was shortlisted for the Slovak submission for the Academy Award for Best Foreign Language Film, but the nomination went to Gypsy.

Apart from the leading role, Tobias recorded the main theme of the movie entitled "Brehy". The song composed Slavo Solovic for lyrics by Peter Lipovský.

== Cast ==
- Szidi Tobias as Bábika
- Attila Mokos as Lajcsi
- Peter Nádasdy as Jancsi
- György Cserhalmi as

=== Additional credits ===
- Rastislav Gore - gaffer
- Tomáš Zednikovič - cinematographer (second unit)
- Oto Häusler - architect
- Juraj Petráň - make-up artist
- Ján Kocman - costume designer
- Peter Gajdoš - director of audiography

== Awards ==
Year	Nominated work	Award	Category	Result
2011	Marhuľový ostrov	Třinecké filmové babí léto	Audience Award - Best Debut	Won

== See also ==
- List of Slovak submissions for the Academy Award for Best Foreign Language Film
