= Ingrid Timková =

Slovak actress

- Born: 17 January 1967 (age 58); Sečovce, Czechoslovakia
- Occupation: actress
- Years active: 1988–present
- Employers: SND, Bratislava (1990–2000); SND, Bratislava (2002–present)
- Organization(s): VŠMU, Bratislava
- Website: Slovak National Theatre

Ingrid Timková (born 17 January 1967) is a Slovak actress. She is most notable for appearing in the first Czech-Slovak film produced in 1993 after the dissolution of Czechoslovakia, Anjel Milosrdenstva (lit. 'The Angel of Mercy'), directed by Miloslav Luther. The role of Anežka brought Timková the Magnolia Award at the 5th Shanghai TV Festival in 1994 as Best Actress in a Television Film.

== Biography ==
Timková was born in Sečovce, formerly Czechoslovak Socialist Republic, as the second descendant of then mother-teacher and father who was a device/traffic chief. She attended the Gymnasium (class of 85') in Trebišov, and continued with study of acting at the Slovak Academy of Performing Arts in Bratislava. As a protégée of director Vladimír Strnisko, she became a member of the Slovak National Theatre's ensemble after graduating in 1990. Along with playing on the stage, she developed her film career mainly on TV. She made her debut on television in Zázračná ihla (1988) by Ján Chlebík. She also took part in other over twenty television plays, some of which included TV series. On the screen, Timková was cast occasionally; overall in five productions. Since the new millennium, the actress is more active in instructing students at the Faculty of Theatre of her former college. Once she also tried a theatre direction (with Sam Shepard's play Fool for Love, 2004) in Bratislava City Theatre. She has an older brother. Timková is single and chidlless.

== Filmography ==
Year	Title	Director
1991	Skús ma objať^{[A]}	Miloslav Luther
1993	Anjel milosrdenstva	Miloslav Luther
1999	Návrat ztraceného ráje ^{[B]}	Vojtěch Jasný
2004	Horem pádem	Jan Hřebejk
2006	Jak se krotí krokodýli	Marie Poledňáková

=== Television ===
Year	Title	Director
1988	Zázračná ihla	Ján Chlebík
1988	Chlapci a chlapi^{[C]}	Evžen Sokolovský
1989	Staroružová dráma^{[C]}	Vido Horňák
1991	Jacobowski a plukovník	Martin Huba
1991	Lorenzaccio^{[C]}	Miloslav Luther
1991	Rozruch na onkológii^{[C]}	Ľuba Velecká
1991	Dobrodinec^{[C]}	Ján Zeman
1992	Výstrel na Bonaparta	Ján Zeman
1992	Kaviareň Lýra	Jozef Bednárik
1993	K.O.	Ľuba Velecká
1993	Zurvalec	Vladimír Strnisko
1994	Hra o láske a smrti	Martin Huba
1994	O Jankovi kľúčiarovi	Igor Kováč
1994	Konec velkých prázdnin^{[C]}	Miloslav Luther
1995	Duchovo nájomné	Ján Zeman
1995	Anatol	Vladimír Strnisko
1995	Komorný spevák	Vladimír Strnisko
1996	Námluvy	Vladimír Strnisko
1997	Legenda Emöke	Vojtěch Štursa
1997	Scenár	Igor Kováč
1998	Svetlo	Igor Kováč
1998	Knieža	Martin Kákoš
2006	Swingtime	Jaromír Polišenský
2007	Mačka na horúcej plechovej streche^{[D]}	Martin Kákoš

- A A TV version of the movie consisted of two episodes.
- B The film was ranked by the US online database IMDb as the 47th Worst English-Language Film with the country of origin Czech Republic.
- C Denotes a television show.
- D Denotes a televised theatre play.

== Awards ==
Year	Nominated work	Award	Category	Result
1994	Anjel milosrdenstva^{[E]}	Magnolia Award	Best Actress	Won
1995	Anjel milosrdenstva^{[E]}	Czech Lion	Best Actress	Nominated^{[F]}
2005	Horem pádem	Czech Lion	Best Supporting Actress	Nominated^{[G]}
2005	Ignorant a Šialenec (by T.Bernhard)	DOSKY Award	Best Actress	Won
2005	Ignorant a Šialenec (by T.Bernhard)	Crystal Wing Awards	Theater and Audiovisual Art	Won

Notes

- E Anjel Milosrdenstva was produced by Slovak Television in co-production with Czech Television and ARS Media. As such it was classified as a TV film. As a result of being also screened in the country of its origin, the title was accepted for the Czech Lion ceremony, which awards mainly feature length films.
- F Won Ivana Chýlková for her role of Olga in Díky za každé nové ráno (1994), directed by Milan Šteindler.
- G Won Klára Melíšková for her role of Zdena in Mistři (2004), directed by Marek Najbrt.
