= It Will Stay Between Us =

- Theatrical release poster
- Original title: Zostane to medzi nami
- Directed by: Miroslav Šindelka
- Written by: Miroslav Šindelka; Slavena Pavlásková; Pavol Rankov
- Produced by: Miroslav Šindelka
- Starring: Tomáš Hanák; Danica Jurčová; Michal Dlouhý
- Cinematography: Ján Ďuriš
- Edited by: Ľuba Ďurkovičová
- Music by: Michal Kaščák; Slavomír Solovic
- Production company: Film Factory
- Distributed by: Bontonfilm (Czech Republic)
- Release dates: October 9, 2003 (Slovakia); March 10, 2005 (Czech Republic)
- Running time: 100 minutes
- Countries: Slovakia; Czech Republic
- Languages: Slovak; Czech

It Will Stay Between Us (Slovak: Zostane to medzi nami) is a 2003 Slovak-Czech feature film, directed by Miroslav Šindelka. The film starred Tomáš Hanák, Danica Jurčová and Michal Dlouhý.

== Cast ==
- Tomáš Hanák as Tomáš
- Danica Jurčová as Danica
- Michal Dlouhý as Michal
- Anna Šišková as Anna
- Božidara Turzonovová as Danica's mother
- Jozef Lenci as Danica's father
- Zdena Studenková as interpreter
- Ľubomír Paulovič as interpreter's boyfriend
- Miroslav Noga as Šimon
- Szidi Tobias as Lea
- Michal Gučík as opera singer
- Zuzana Fialová as opera singer's girlfriend
- Matej Landl as Maťo
- Zuzana Belohorcová as call girl
- Radim Uzel as psychiatrist
- František Kovár as priest
- Rastislav Piško as real estate agent
- Jaroslav Bekr as Jarko
- Marek Vašut as detective
- Marián Varga as organist
- Radoslav Brzobohatý as car accident's victim
- Hana Štěpánková as waitress

=== Additional credits ===
- Dušan Kojnok - architect
- Vladimír Illiť - sound
- Oľga Detaryová - supervising producer
- Darina Šuranová - costume designer
- Brani Gröhling - makeup artist
- Jiří Klenka - mix
- Pavel Štverák - sound consultant
- Jaroslav Bekr - choreographer

== Awards ==
| Year | Nomination | Award | Category | Result |
|---|---|---|---|---|
| 2004 | Michal Kaščák | Art Film Fest - SFZ, ÚSTT & LF Reward | Film Score | Won |
| 2004 | Slavomír Solovic | Art Film Fest - SFZ, ÚSTT & LF Reward | Film Score | Won |
