= Do vetra =

Studio album by Szidi Tobias
- Released: December 2010
- Genre: World music; folk; jazz; chanson; ska
- Length: 38:33
- Label: Studio DVA (#MH01-2010)
- Producer: Michal Hrubý

Szidi Tobias chronology
Pod obojím (2008)	Do vetra (2010)	Vánoční koleda (2011)

Do vetra (To the Wind) is the fourth studio album by Slovak vocalist Szidi Tobias released on Studio DVA in 2010.

== Track listing ==
All music is composed by Milan Vyskočáni

No.	Title	Lyrics	Length
1.	"Zem ze dna světa čerpá síly" (in Czech)	Michal Horáček	3:58
2.	"Milovaná" (in Czech)	Michal Horáček	3:48
3.	"Három fiú" (in Hungarian)	Sándor Petöfi	6:28
4.	"Dala som milému" (in Slovak)	Peter Lipovský	3:20
5.	"Smutná" (in Slovak)	Peter Lipovský	4:26
6.	"Fiam születésére" (in Hungarian)	Sándor Petöfi	3:38
7.	"Jediná" (in Slovak)	Peter Lipovský	3:19
8.	"Lojzko" (in Slovak)	Peter Lipovský	3:48
9.	"Poď" (in Slovak)	Peter Lipovský	3:04
10.	"Uspávanka" (in Slovak)	Lope de Vega	2:50
Total length:			38:33

== Credits and personnel ==
- Szidi Tobias - lead vocal
- Milan Vyskočáni - music
- Peter Lipovský - lyrics
- Michal Horáček - lyrics
- Sándor Petőfi - lyrics
- Lope de Vega - lyrics
- Michal Hrubý - producer
- Lucie Robinson - photography
- Jozef Dobrík/Pestro - design
- TV Nova - sponsor

== Charts ==
Chart (2011)	Peak position
Czech Albums Chart	23
