= List of Slovak submissions for the Academy Award for Best International Feature Film =

Best International Feature Film submissions from Slovakia

Highlights
- Debut: 1993
- Submissions: 30
- Nominations: none
- Oscar winners: none

Slovakia has submitted films for the Academy Award for Best International Feature Film (Note: The category was previously named the Academy Award for Best Foreign Language Film, but this was changed to the Academy Award for Best International Feature Film in April 2019, after the Academy deemed the word "Foreign" to be outdated.) since 1993. The award is handed out annually by the United States Academy of Motion Picture Arts and Sciences to a feature-length motion picture produced outside the United States that contains primarily non-English dialogue.

Until 1993, the Slovakia was a constituent republic within Czechoslovakia, and Czech and Slovaks routinely collaborated on national productions. The Shop on Main Street won the category in 1966, it was a Slovak-language production and was also the first Czechoslovak film to be nominated for an Oscar.

As of 2026, Slovakia has submitted thirty films, but none of them were nominated.

== Submissions ==
The Academy of Motion Picture Arts and Sciences has invited the film industries of various countries to submit their best film for the Academy Award for Best International Feature Film since 1956. The International Feature Film Committee oversees the process and reviews all the submitted films. Following this, they vote via secret ballot to determine the five nominees for the award.

The Slovak submission is decided annually by the Slovak Film and Television Academy (Slovenská filmová a televízna akadémia).

Seven of the submitted films were directed by Martin Šulík, the most between any filmmaker.

In 2008 the producers of Bathory protested the decision of the Slovak Academy not to consider their film, the most expensive in Slovak history, for an Oscar nomination. The Slovak Academy said the multi-national production, which was filmed in Slovak- and English-language versions, did not qualify as a Slovak production, as only one criterion of its definition was met. The Academy instead chose documentary Blind Loves from a shortlist of four films.

Most of the films are at least partially in Slovak, although All My Loved Ones (1999) is primarily in Czech, King of Thieves (2003) and Return of the Storks (2007) have much of their dialogue in German, and Flood (2026) is primarily in Rusyn.

Below is a list of the films that have been submitted by the Slovak Republic for review by the Academy for the award by the year of the submission and the respective Academy Award ceremony.

Year (Ceremony)	Film title used in nomination	Original title	Director(s)	Result
1993 (66th)	Everything I Like	Všetko čo mám rád	Martin Šulík	Not nominated
1994 (67th)	Angel of Mercy	Anjel milosrdenstva	Miloslav Luther	Not nominated
1995 (68th)	The Garden	Záhrada	Martin Šulík	Not nominated
1997 (70th)	Orbis Pictus		Martin Šulík	Not nominated
1998 (71st)	Rivers of Babylon		Vladimír Balco	Not nominated
1999 (72nd)	All My Loved Ones	Všichni moji blízcí	Matej Mináč	Not nominated
2000 (73rd)	Landscape	Krajinka	Martin Šulík	Not nominated
2002 (75th)	Cruel Joys	Kruté radosti	Juraj Nvota	Not nominated
2003 (76th)	King of Thieves	Kráľ zlodejov	Ivan Fíla	Not nominated
2005 (78th)	The City of the Sun	Slnečný štát	Martin Šulík	Not nominated
2007 (80th)	Return of the Storks	Návrat bocianov	Martin Repka	Not nominated
2008 (81st)	Blind Loves	Slepe lásky	Juraj Lehotský	Not nominated
2009 (82nd)	Broken Promise	Nedodržaný sľub	Jiří Chlumský	Not nominated
2010 (83rd)	The Border	Hranica	Jaroslav Vojtek	Not nominated
2011 (84th)	Gypsy	Cigán	Martin Šulík	Not nominated
2012 (85th)	Made in Ash	Až do mesta Aš	Iveta Grófová	Not nominated
2013 (86th)	My Dog Killer	Môj pes Killer	Mira Fornay	Not nominated
2014 (87th)	A Step into the Dark	Krok do tmy	Miloslav Luther	Not nominated
2015 (88th)	Goat	Koza	Ivan Ostrochovský	Not nominated
2016 (89th)	Eva Nová		Marko Škop	Not nominated
2017 (90th)	The Line	Čiara	Peter Bebjak	Not nominated
2018 (91st)	The Interpreter	Tlmočník	Martin Šulík	Not nominated
2019 (92nd)	Let There Be Light	Nech je svetlo	Marko Škop	Not nominated
2020 (93rd)	The Auschwitz Report	Správa	Peter Bebjak	Not nominated
2021 (94th)	107 Mothers	Cenzorka	Péter Kerekes	Not nominated
2022 (95th)	Victim	Obeť	Michal Blaško	Not nominated
2023 (96th)	Photophobia	Svetloplachosť	Ivan Ostrochovský and Pavol Pekarčík	Not nominated
2024 (97th)	The Hungarian Dressmaker	Ema a smrtihlav	Iveta Grófová	Not nominated
2025 (98th)	Father	Otec	Tereza Nvotová	Not nominated
2026 (99th)	Flood	Potopa	Martin Gonda	Pending

== See also ==
- List of Czechoslovak submissions for the Academy Award for Best International Feature Film
- List of Academy Award winners and nominees for Best International Feature Film
- List of Academy Award-winning foreign language films
- Cinema of Slovakia
