= The Hungarian Dressmaker =

2024 film

- Promotional release poster
- Directed by: Iveta Grófová
- Story by: Peter Krištúfek; Iveta Grófová
- Based on: Ema a smrtihlav by Peter Krištúfek
- Produced by: Zuzana Mistríková; Ondřej Trojan
- Starring: Alexandra Borbély; Nico Klimek; Milan Ondrík
- Edited by: Martin Malo
- Distributed by: REASON8
- Release date: 26 September 2024
- Running time: 129 minutes
- Countries: Slovakia; Czech Republic
- Languages: German; Hungarian; Slovak

The Hungarian Dressmaker (Slovak: Ema a smrtihlav, lit. 'Emma and Death's Head') is a 2024 drama film directed by Iveta Grófová. Set in World War II, it tells the story of the Hungarian widow Marika, who hides a Jewish boy from a fascist militia in her house nearby Bratislava. The story is an adaptation of an eponymous novel by Peter Krištúfek.

== Plot ==
Slovak Republic, 1942. The shadow of World War II looms large, and the newly established Slovak state embraces a nationalist ideology that targets minorities. With the expulsion of Czechs complete, the regime sets its sights on the Jewish population, commencing their deportation. Amidst this turmoil, Marika, a Hungarian widow living in a small village, faces the repercussions of this escalating persecution. Having lost her job in Bratislava due to her ethnicity, she now finds her village Biskupice pri Dunaji overrun by the Hlinka Guard, whose mission is to assert Slovak dominance.

Marika's situation becomes even more precarious as she secretly shelters a young Jewish boy. Striving to avoid detection, she nevertheless attracts the unwanted attention of two powerful figures: a Slovak Hlinka Guard captain and a German Nazi officer. Caught between their competing interests, Marika must rely on her wits and courage to safeguard the boy and survive in an increasingly dangerous world.

== Cast ==
- Alexandra Borbély as Mária "Marika" Sándorfi (née Otiszová), a Slovak Hungarian widowed dressmaker
- Milan Ondrík as Captain Dušan, a Slovak officer in the Hlinka Guard
- Nico Klimek as Šimon, a Czech Jewish boy whom Marika is hiding
- Alexander E. Fennon as Heinz Lepke, a Sudeten German Nazi officer married to a Czech
- Dénes Újlaky as Sándorfi, Marika's father-in-law
- Florentín Groll as Mr. Kramer, Marika's neighbour
- Éva Bandor as Agnes
- Ján Mistrík as Jožko Báči
- László Mátray as Guard Janko
- Lili Monori as Marika's mother-in-law

== Release ==
The Hungarian Dressmaker had its world premiere in June 2024 at the 58th Karlovy Vary International Film Festival as part of the Crystal Globe Competition. It also screened at Thessaloniki International Film Festival and Palm Springs International Film Festival among many others. International sales are handled by London-based REASON8.

== Accolades ==
The Hungarian Dressmaker was the Slovak submission for the Academy Award for Best Foreign Language Film for the 97th Academy Awards, but it was not nominated. Milan Ondrík was nominated for best supporting actor at the 2024 Czech Lion Awards for his role in the movie.
