= Rudolf Urc =

Slovak film director and dramaturg (1937–2026)

- Born: 12 June 1937; Zvolen, Czechoslovakia
- Died: 13 January 2026 (aged 88)
- Education: Film and TV School of the Academy of Performing Arts (FAMU)
- Occupations: Director; Dramaturg

Rudolf Urc (12 June 1937 – 13 January 2026) was a Slovak film director, dramaturg and writer who was a founding figure of Slovak animated film. He was a recipient of the Pribina Cross, for his contributions to the development of Slovak cinematography.

== Early life and education ==
Rudolf Urc was born in Zvolen on 12 June 1937. He studied dramaturgy at the Film and TV School of the Academy of Performing Arts (FAMU) in Prague, graduating in 1960.

== Career ==
=== Film career ===
Urc began his professional career as a director and head dramaturg at the Newsreel Film Unit and the Short Film Studio in Bratislava. During the 1960s, Urc was a key figure in the "thaw" of Slovak documentary filmmaking. He collaborated frequently with Ján Sýkora, notably on the film Hlási sa Slobodný slovenský vysielač (The Free Slovak Broadcaster Calls, 1964), which challenged official historical narratives of the Slovak National Uprising. During the period of political normalization following the 1968 Warsaw Pact invasion, Urc was barred from documentary filmmaking. He subsequently moved into the field of animation, which became the focus of his later career.

As the head dramaturg of the Studio of Animated Film at Koliba, Urc mentored a generation of animators. He was instrumental in the development of the Večerníček (bedtime story) format for television, directing and overseeing series that became staples of Slovak broadcasting. In 1985, he co-founded the Biennial of Animation Bratislava (BAB).

=== Academic and scholarly work ===
Following the Velvet Revolution in 1989, Urc was instrumental in establishing the Department of Animation at the Academy of Performing Arts in Bratislava (VŠMU). Urc's founding of the Department of Animation at VŠMU represented a "rescue mission" for the medium following the collapse of the state-run Koliba film studios. In his later years, he became a prominent advocate for oral history in film studies, working to record the testimonies of filmmakers from the communist era to ensure a complete historical record.

As a film scholar, he published several foundational texts on Slovak cinema, including Slovenský animovaný film (Slovak Animated Film) and various historical monographs on documentary filmmaking.

== Death ==
Urc died on 13 January 2026, at the age of 88.

== Awards and recognition ==
In 2017, Urc was awarded the Sun in a Net Award for his lifelong contribution to Slovak cinema. In 2020, he was awarded the Pribina Cross, 1st class by the president of Slovakia Zuzana Čaputová.

== Selected filmography ==
=== Documentaries ===
- The Man from Málinec (Človek z Málinca, 1959)
- The Generals (Generáli, 1969)
- Shots in Košúty (Výstrely v Košútoch, 1971)
- Rebel Pilots (Povstaleckí letci, 1974)

=== Animated films and series ===
- The Ploughman and the Giants (Oráč a obri, 1975)
- Master Christian (Majster Kristián, series, 1979–1981)
- Stories from the Blue Caravan (Príbehy z belasej maringotky, series, 1982–1986)
- The Magical World of Animated Film (Čarovný svet animovaného filmu, documentary series, 2010)

== Selected publications ==
- Animated Film (Animovaný film, 1980)
- Chapters from the Theory of Animated Film (Kapitoly z teórie animovaného filmu, 1986)
- Viktor Kubal: Filmmaker, Artist, Humorist (2010)
- The Invisible History of Documentarians (Neviditeľné dejiny dokumentaristov, 2017)
