= Peter Bebjak =

Slovak actor, director, producer, and writer

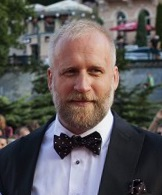
- Peter Bebjak in 2016.
- Born: Peter Bebjak (*1970); Partizánske, Czechoslovakia; Chynorany (origin)
- Occupation(s): Actor, director, producer, writer
- Years active: 1992–present
- Employer: DNA Production (since 2001)

Peter Bebjak (born 1970 in Czechoslovakia) is a Slovak actor, director, producer and writer. In 2001, and along with Rastislav Šesták, he established DNA Production company.

== Filmography ==
=== Cinema ===
Year	Title	Director	Production
As actor
2001	Hana a jej bratia	Vladimír Adásek	Slovakia
2003	Faithless Games	Michaela Pavlátová	Czech Republic; Slovakia
2011	Anjeli	Róbert Šveda	Slovakia
As director
1996	Miraculus (short film)^{[A]}	Himself	Slovakia
2010	Voices (short film)^{[A]}	Himself; Yuri Korec	Slovakia
2011	Apricot Island	Himself	Slovakia
2012	Zlo	Himself	Slovakia
2017	The Line		As producer
2007	Démoni	Róbert Šveda	Slovakia
2011	Apricot Island	Himself	Slovakia
2019	The Rift	Himself	Slovakia
2020	The Auschwitz Report		
2022	Shadowplay	Film Director	Czech Republic; Slovakia

Notes

- A Also credited as writer.

=== Television ===
Year	Title	Director(s)	Production
As actor
1992	Most	Ľubo Kocka	Czechoslovakia
1994	Koniec veľkých prázdnin (TV series)	Miloslav Luther	Austria; Czech Republic; Slovakia; Slovenia
2002	Quartétto	Laura Siváková	Czech Republic; Slovakia
2008	Keep smiling	Pavol Korec	Slovakia
As director
2008	Mesto tieňov (TV series)	Himself; Gejza Dezorz; Róbert Šveda	Slovakia
2008	Kriminálka Anděl (TV series)	Himself; Róbert Šveda; Gejza Dezorz; Dan Wlodarczyk; Jiří Chlumský; Ivan Pokorný	Czech Republic
2009	Rádio (TV series)	Himself; Gejza Dezorz; Miro Roganský; Ján Sabol; Róbert Šveda	Slovakia
2009	Ako som prežil (TV series)	Himself; Róbert Šveda; Albert Vlk; Matúš Libovič; Gejza Dezorz	Slovakia
2009	Odsúdené (TV series)	Himself; Róbert Šveda	Czech Republic; Slovakia
2010	Aféry (TV series)	Himself; Roman Fábian; Gejza Dezorz	Slovakia
2011	Nevinní (TV series)	Himself	Slovakia
2011	Dr. Ludsky (TV series)	Himself; Róbert Šveda	Slovakia
As producer
2010	Aféry (TV series)	Himself; Roman Fábian; Gejza Dezorz	Slovakia

== See also ==
- List of Slovak submissions for the Academy Award for Best Foreign Language Film
