= Marko Škop =

Slovak film director

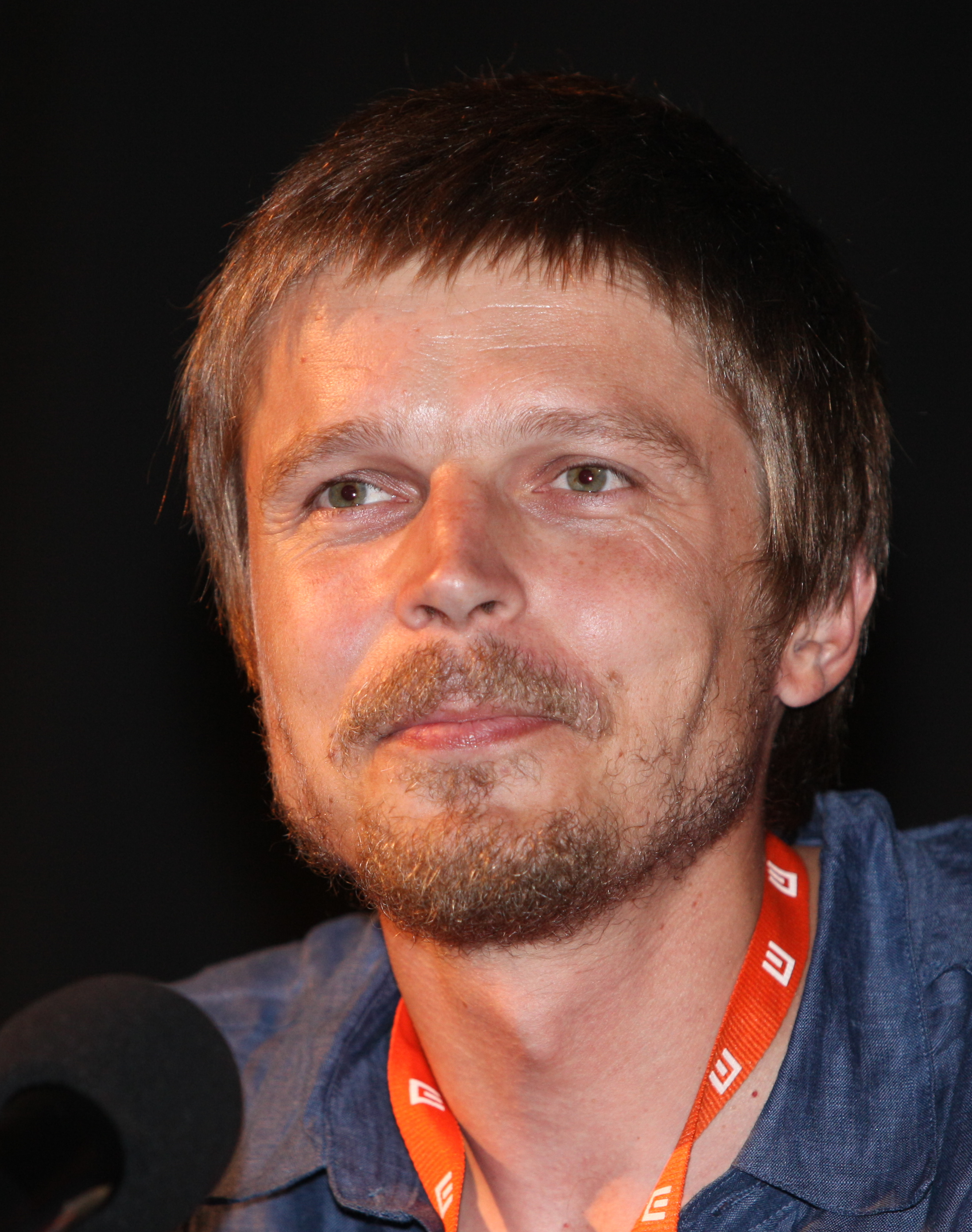
- Marko Škop (2009)
- Born: 1974 (age 51–52); Prešov, Slovakia
- Education: Comenius University in Bratislava; Academy of Performing Arts in Bratislava
- Occupation: Film director

Marko Škop (born 1974) is a Slovak film director.

== Education ==
He received degrees in journalism at Comenius University in Bratislava in 1996 and in film directing at the Academy of Performing Arts in Bratislava in 2001. He gained his PhD in Mass Media from the Faculty of Philosophy at Comenius University in Bratislava in 2005.

== Awards ==
At the Karlovy Vary International Film Festival, Other Worlds received the "Audience Award" and "Special Mention of the Jury" in 2006, and Osadné was awarded "Best Documentary" in 2009.

At the BFI London Film Festival, Osadné was nominated for the "Grierson Award" in 2009.

At the 2015 Toronto International Film Festival, Eva Nová won the prize of the International Federation of Film Critics (FIPRESCI) for the Discovery programme.

== Filmography ==
- 2006: Other Worlds / Iné svety
- 2008: Blind Loves / Slepé lásky (Producer)
- 2009: Osadné
- 2012: New Life of Family Album / Nový život (Producer)
- 2013: Miracle / Zázrak (Producer)
- 2015: Eva Nová (Director / Writer / Producer)
- 2019: Let There Be Light (Director / Producer)
