= Iveta Grófová =

Slovak film director (born 1980)

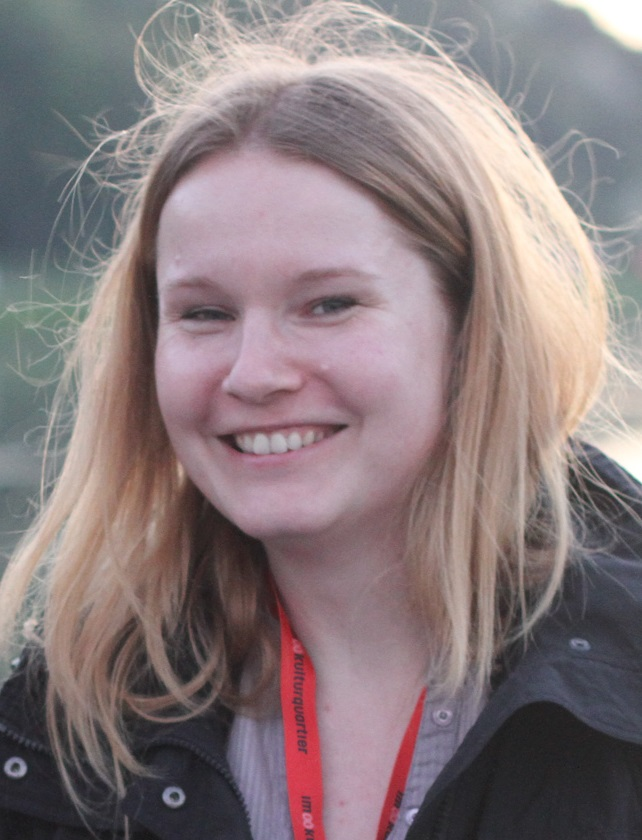
- Grófová in 2013
- Born: 31 October 1980 (age 44); Trenčín, Czechoslovakia
- Occupation: Director
- Years active: 2003-present

Iveta Grófová (born 31 October 1980) is a Slovak film director. She studied at the Academy of Performing Arts in Bratislava (VŠMU). Her directorial debut was the 2012 film Made in Ash, which was nominated as Slovakia's submission for the Academy Award for Best Foreign Language Film. Grófová's second film, Piata loď, was screened at the 67th Berlin International Film Festival. It went on to be nominated in 10 categories at the 2018 Sun in a Net Awards.

== Selected filmography ==
=== Director ===
- Made in Ash (2012)
- Piata loď (2017)
- The Hungarian Dressmaker (2024)
