= Punto Fijo (album) =

Studio album by Szidi Tobias
- Released: 8 December 2003
- Genre: World music; folk; jazz; chanson; ska
- Length: 43:43
- Label: BMG Ariola; Studio DVA (#MH02-2009) - re-release

Szidi Tobias chronology
Divý mak (2001)	Punto Fijo (2003)	Pod obojím (2008)

Punto Fijo (from Spanish: Fixed Point; also transcribed as "Axis mundi") is the second studio album by Slovak vocalist Szidi Tobias released on BMG Ariola in 2003.

== Track listing ==
All lyrics are written by Peter Lipovský; all music is composed by Milan Vyskočáni

No.	Title	Featured artist	Length
1.	"Mrak" (in Slovak)		3:59
2.	"Punto Fijo" (in Czech)		3:59
3.	"Dvanásť duší" (in Slovak)		3:18
4.	"Obracím" (in Czech)	Ivana Chýlková	3:19
5.	"Pred obrazom Fridy Kahlo" (in Slovak)	Peter Lipovský	4:29
6.	"Tiene nad krajinou Arles" (in Slovak)		3:21
7.	"Púpavienka" (in Slovak)		3:28
8.	"František" (in Slovak)	Milan Vyskočáni	2:56
9.	"Schelingerov most" (in Slovak)		4:00
10.	"Taťkov veľký deň" (in Slovak)	Milan Vyskočáni	2:35
11.	"Fedi a Piti" (in Slovak)		3:22
12.	"Tak málo lásky" (in Slovak)		4:57
Total length:			43:43

Notes

- Tracks performed by featured artists includes no vocal contribution by Tobias herself.

== Credits and personnel ==
- Szidi Tobias - lead vocal
- Milan Vyskočáni - music, lead vocal
- Peter Lipovský - lyrics, lead vocal
- Ivana Chýlková - lead vocal
