= Pod obojím =

Studio album by Szidi Tobias
- Released: November 24, 2008
- Genre: World music; folk; jazz; chanson; ska
- Length: 40:31
- Label: Studio DVA (#MH01-2008)
- Producer: Michal Hrubý

Szidi Tobias chronology
| Punto Fijo (2003) | Pod obojím (2008) | Do vetra (2010) |

Pod obojím (Under Either) is the third studio album by Slovak vocalist Szidi Tobias released on Studio DVA in 2008.

== Track listing ==
All lyrics are written by Peter Lipovský; all music is composed by Milan Vyskočáni.

| No. | Title | Featured artist | Length |
|---|---|---|---|
| 1. | "Bříza" (in Czech) | | 3:45 |
| 2. | "Pod obojím" (in Czech) | Richard Müller | 3:51 |
| 3. | "Bylobudenení" (in Czech) | | 4:06 |
| 4. | "Sama" (in Slovak) | | 3:08 |
| 5. | "Ta, co spí vedle" (in Czech) | Marián Geišberg | 3:33 |
| 6. | "Dva koně Chagalla" (in Czech) | Richard Müller | 4:57 |
| 7. | "Vallahogy" (in Hungarian) | | 3:31 |
| 8. | "Slnečnice" (in Slovak) | | 3:19 |
| 9. | "Jak Franta Bagr Bušič uvěřil v Boha" (in Czech) | František Segrado | 2:33 |
| 10. | "Z plnejch plic" (in Czech) | | 3:51 |
| 11. | "Vodenka" (in Slovak) | | 3:57 |
| Total length: | | | 40:31 |

== Credits and personnel ==
- Szidi Tobias - lead vocal
- Richard Müller - lead vocal
- Marián Geišberg - lead vocal
- František Segrado - lead vocal
- Milan Vyskočáni - music, back vocal
- Peter Lipovský - lyrics
- Michal Hrubý - producer
- Kristína Mikitová - back vocal
- Silvia Vitteková - back vocal
- Mária Straková - back vocal
- KAMOTO - recording studio
- Studio LUX - mixing, mastering
- Lucie Robinson - photography
- Jozef Dobrík - design

== Charts and sales ==
=== Weekly charts ===
| Chart (2008) | Peak position |
|---|---|
| Czech Albums Chart | 24 |

=== Sales certifications ===
| Country | Certification | Quota |
|---|---|---|
| Czech Republic | Gold | 5,000 |
