= Miroslav Šindelka =

Slovak director, writer and producer (born 1963)

- Born: 27 June 1963 (age 63); Bratislava, Czechoslovakia
- Other name: Miro Šindelka
- Occupations: Director, producer, writer

Miroslav Šindelka (born 27 June 1963) is a Slovak director, writer and producer. In 1996, he founded the production company "Film Factory".

== Filmography ==
Year	Title	Notes
1991	Hore-dole	
1992	Veľká potreba: Premena muža a ženy	short film, with Martin Knut
1994	Vášnivý bozk	also credited as co-writer
2003	Zostane to medzi nami	also credited as co-writer and producer

=== Music videos ===
- Hex, "Votrelec"
- Richard Müller
- Robo Grogorov
- Free Faces
- Bez ladu a skladu
