= Miloslav Luther =

Slovak film director and screenwriter (born 1945)

- Born: 14 August 1945 (age 81)
- Education: Academy of Performing Arts in Bratislava
- Occupations: Film director, screenwriter

Miloslav Luther (born 14 August 1945) is a Slovak film director and screenwriter. He was a member of the Federal board for broadcasting and retransmission of the Czechoslovak Federative Republic, a member of the Board of Slovak Television, vice-president of the Slovak Film and Television Academy and a pedagogue of directing at the Academy of Performing Arts in Bratislava. He is the head of the board of the Slovak Audiovisual Fund as well as a member of the Slovak Film Institute board.

== Selected filmography ==
- A Step Into the Dark (2014)
- Mosquitos' Tango (2009)
- Escape to Buda (2002)
- Angel of Mercy (1993)
- Try to Embrace Me (1991)
- Witness of the Dying Time (1990)
- A Path Across Danube (1989)
- Bit Part (1988)
- Mahuliena, The Golden Maid (1986)
- Forget Mozart (1985)
- King Blackbird (1984)
- Old Beekeeper (1981)
- A Triptych About Love (1980)
- A Morning Under Moon (1979)
