= List of Slovak films of the 2010s =

A List of Slovak films of the 2010s.

English title	Slovak title	Director	Cast, notes	Genre	Year	Co-production
Flying Cyprian	Legenda o lietajúcom Cypriánovi	Mariana Čengel Solčanská	Marko Igonda, Pawel Malaszynski, Alexander Domogarov	History, drama	2010	Poland
Mongolia: In the Shadow of Genghis Khan	Mongolsko – V tieni Džingischána	Pavol Barabáš		Documentary	2010	
Protected Territory	Chránené územie	Adam Hanuljak		Documentary	2010	
The Corpse Must Die	Mŕtvola musí zomrieť	Jozef Paštéka		Comedy	2011	
Nicky's Family	Nickyho rodina	Matej Mináč		Documentary, history	2011	Czech Republic
Apricot Island	Marhuľový ostrov	Peter Bebjak		Drama, romantic	2011	
Lidice	Lidice	Petr Nikolaev		Drama, History	2011	Czech Republic; Poland
The House	Dom	Zuzana Liová		Drama	2011	
Lóve	Lóve	Jakub Kroner		Drama, thriller	2011	
Gypsy	Cigán	Martin Šulík	Slovakia's submission to the 84th Academy Awards for the Academy Award for Best Foreign Language Film	Drama	2011	Czech Republic
Devínsky masaker	Devínsky masaker	Gejza Dezorz, Jozef Páleník		Documentary, drama	2011	
Visible World	Viditeľný svet	Peter Krištúfek		Drama	2011	
The Iron Hole	Trou de fer: Železná diera	Pavol Barabáš		Documentary	2011	
Muži revolúcie	Muži revolúcie	Zuzana Piussi		Documentary	2012	
The Grasp of the State	Od Fica do Fica	Zuzana Piussi		Documentary	2012	
Immortalitas	Immortalitas	Erik Bošnák		Action, sci-fi	2012	
The Confidant	eŠteBák	Juraj Nvota		Drama, history	2012	
Angels	Anjeli	Róbert Šveda		Drama	2012	
The Blue Tiger	Modrý tiger	Petr Oukropec		Family, comedy	2012	Czech Republic; Germany
Tigers in the City	Tigre v meste	Juraj Krasnohorsky		Comedy	2012	
Don´t Stop	Don´t Stop	Richard Řeřicha		Drama	2012	Czech Republic
Dancing On Broken Glass	Tanec medzi črepinami	Marek Ťapák		Drama	2012	
Evil	Zlo	Peter Bebjak		Horror	2012	
Tak fajn	Tak fajn	Pavol Janík ml.		Comedy	2012	
Made in Ash	Až do mesta Aš	Iveta Grófová	Slovakia's submission to the 85th Academy Awards for the Academy Award for Best Foreign Language Film	Drama	2012	
Seven Days of Sin	7 dní hříchů	Jiří Chlumský		Drama	2012	Czech Republic
Attonitas	Attonitas	Jaroslav Mottl		Horror	2012	
The Gypsy Vote	Cigáni idú do volieb	Jaroslav Vojtek		Documentary	2012	Czech Republic
Aftermath	Dozvuky	Władysław Pasikowski		Drama	2012	Poland; Russia; Netherlands
Fragile Identity	Krehká identita	Zuzana Piussi		Documentary	2012	Czech Republic
New Life of a Family Album	Nový život	Adam Oľha		Documentary	2012	Czech Republic
In The Shadow	V tieni	David Ondříček		Crime, drama, thriller	2012	Czech Republic; Poland
Graduates - Freedom Is Not for Free	Absolventi - Sloboda nie je zadarmo	Tomáš Krupa		Documentary	2012	
Bells of Happiness	Zvonky šťastia	Marek Šulík, Jana Bučková		Documentary, comedy	2012	
Like Never Before	Ako nikdy	Zdeněk Tyc		Drama	2013	
Babie leto	Babie leto	Gejza Dezorz		Crime, thriller	2013	
Miners' Bread	Banícky chlebíček	Roman Fábian		Documentary	2013	
Colette	Colette	Milan Cieslar		Drama	2013	Czech Republic
Cyril and Methodius - The Apostles of the Slavs	Cyril a Metod - Apoštoli Slovanov	Petr Nikolaev		Historical, drama	2013	Czech Republic; Russia; Serbia; Slovenia
Fine, Thanks	Ďakujem, dobre	Mátyás Prikler		Drama	2013	
Candidate	Kandidát	Jonáš Karásek		Thriller	2013	Czech Republic
My Dog Killer	Môj pes Killer	Mira Fornay	Slovakia's submission to the 86th Academy Awards for the Academy Award for Best Foreign Language Film	Drama	2013	Czech Republic
Little Baby Jesus	Dočkáme sa Ježiška?	Lenka Kny		Romantic	2013	Czech Republic; Mexico
Eugenic Minds	Eugéniovia	Pavel Štingl		Documentary	2013	Czech Republic
38	38: Filmová pocta hokejovej legende	Lukáš Zednikovič, Daniel Dangl		Documentary	2014	
Fair Play	Fair Play	Andrea Sedláčková	Judit Bárdos, Anna Geislerová, Roman Luknár	Drama	2014	Czech Republic
Láska na vlásku	Láska na vlásku	Mariana Čengel Solčanská		Family	2014	
Hostage	Rukojemník	Juraj Nvota		Drama	2014	Czech Republic
In Silence	V tichu	Zdeněk Jiráský		Biographical	2014	Czech Republic
Mirage	Mirage	Szabolcs Hajdu		Drama	2014	Hungary
A Step into the Dark	Krok do tmy	Miloslav Luther	Slovakia's submission to the 87th Academy Awards for the Academy Award for Best Foreign Language Film	Drama	2014	
Goat	Koza	Ivan Ostrochovský	Slovakia's submission to the 88th Academy Awards for the Academy Award for Best Foreign Language Film	Drama	2015	
The Seven Ravens	Sedem zhavranelých bratov	Alice Nellis		Fairytale	2015	Czech Republic
Eva Nová	Eva Nová	Marko Škop	Slovakia's submission to the 89th Academy Awards for the Academy Award for Best Foreign Language Film	Drama	2015	
The Teacher	Učiteľka	Jan Hřebejk		Drama	2016	
The Line	Čiara	Peter Bebjak	Slovakia's submission to the 90th Academy Awards for the Academy Award for Best Foreign Language Film	Crime	2017	Ukraine; Czech Republic
Kidnapping	Únos	Mariana Čengel Solčanská	Milan Ondrík, Dano Heriban, Rebeka Poláková, Maroš Kramár, Tomáš Hanák	Drama	2017	
Little Harbour	Piata loď	Iveta Grófová		Drama, family	2017	
All Or Nothing	Všetko alebo nič	Marta Ferencová	Táňa Pauhofová, Michał Żebrowski, Klára Issová	Romantic, comedy	2017	Czech Republic; Poland
Nina	Nina	Juraj Lehotský		Drama	2017	
Out	Vychladnutie	György Kristóf		Drama	2017	
Cellar	Pivnica	Igor Voloshin	Jean-Marc Barr, Oľga Simonova, Milan Ondrík, Jana Oľhová, Dalyb	Drama	2018	
The Interpreter	Tlmočník	Martin Šulík	Slovakia's submission to the 91st Academy Awards for the Academy Award for Best Foreign Language Film	Drama	2018	
Let There Be Light	Nech je svetlo	Marko Skop	Milan Ondrik, Frantisek Beles	Drama	2019	
Punk Never Ends!	Punk je hned!	Juro Šlauka	Pavol Kovačovský, Juraj Gerža, Mário Fríbert	Drama	2019	Czech Republic
The Rift	Trhlina	Peter Bebjak	Matej Marušín, Mária Bartalos	Thriller	2019	
