= List of Slovak films of the 2020s =

A List of Slovak films of the 2020s.

Title	Director	Cast	Genre	Length	Co-production	Notes
2020
Attila	Petr Větrovský	Attila Végh, Rytmus, Pavol Neruda	Documentary	125 Minutes		
Everest, the Hard Way	Pavol Barabáš	Chris Bonington, Ivan Fiala, Peter Habeler	Documentary	52 Minutes		
HocKEy dram	Marek Vaňous		Documentary	80 Minutes		
Far Too Personal	Marta Ferencová	Petra Hřebíčková, Tatiana Dyková, Eliška Balzerová, Ľuboš Kostelný	Comedy/Drama	107 Minutes	Czech Republic	
Healing Waters	Ján Sebechlebský	Darija Pavlovičová,, Marián Mitaš, Jakub Spišák	Fantasy	90 Minutes	Czech Republic	
Rytmus: Tempos	Roman Kelemen	Rytmus	Documentary	96 Minutes		
Libertas	Boris Vereš		Documentary	63 Minutes		
Salto is the King	Pavol Barabáš	Miroslav Dušek, Tomáš Lukačovič, Pavol Barabáš	Documentary	64 Minutes		
Scumbag	Mariana Čengel Solčanská; Rudolf Biermann	Jozef Vajda, Dano Heriban, Diana Mórová	Drama/Thriller	104 Minutes		
Servants	Ivan Ostrochovský	Samuel Skyva, Samuel Polakovič, Vlad Ivanov	Drama	88 Minutes	Czech Republic; Romania; Ireland	
Summer Rebels	Martina Saková	Pavel Nový, Eliáš Vyskočil, Liana Pavlíková, Szidi Tobias	Adventure	93 Minutes	Germany	
The Auschwitz Report	Peter Babjak	Noël Czuczor, Peter Ondrejička, Jan Nedbal	Drama	94 Minutes	Czech Republic; Germany; Poland	Slovak entry for the Best International Feature Film at the 93rd Academy Awards.
The Golden Boys: A Story of Slovak ice hockey	Ľubomír Ján Slivka	Marián Bezák, Peter Bondra, Stan Bowman	Documentary	2*52 Minutes		
The Golden Land	Dominik Jursa	Roland Noga, Juraj Lukáč, Vladimír Ferko	Documentary	64 Minutes		
The Man with Hare Ears	Martin Šulík	Miroslav Krobot, Oldřich Kaiser, Alexandra Borbély	Thriller/Drama	104 Minutes	Czech Republic	
Unseen	Maia Martiniak		Documentary	87 Minutes		
Orchestra from the Land of Silence	Lucia Kašová		Documentary	30 Minutes	Afghanistan	
2021
107 Mothers	Péter Kerekes	Maryna Klimova, Iryna Kiryazeva, Lyubov Vasylyna	Documentary/Drama	93 Minutes	Czech Republic; Ukraine	2020-21 Sun in a Net Awards Best Film winner and Slovak entry for the Best International Feature Film at the 94th Academy Awards.
Dhaulagiri is my Everest	Pavol Barabáš	Zoltán Demján	Documentary	64 Minutes	Germany	
Happy New Year 2: Dobro došli	Jakub Kroner	Tatiana Pauhofová, Antónia Lišková, Gabriela Marcinková	Romantic comedy	95 Minutes	Czech Republic	
Jozef Mak	Peter Bebjak	Dávid Hartl, Judit Bárdos, Diana Mórová	Comedy/Drama	120 Minutes		
Known Unknown	Zuzana Marianková	Tatiana Pauhofová, Klára Issová, Martin Hofmann	Comedy/Drama	103 Minutes	Czech Republic	
Lines	Barbora Sliepková	Maroš Bango, Matúš Čupka, Zuzana Čaputová	Documentary	80 Minutes		
The Sailor	Lucia Kašová	Paul Erling Johnson	Documentary	79 Minutes		2021 Best Feature Documentary Grand Prize winner at Rhode Island International Film Festival
2022
Black on a White Horse	Rastislav Boroš	Milan Ondrík, Rebeka Poláková, Attila Mokos	Comedy	94Minutes		
Dezo Hoffmann – Photographer of The Beatles	Patrik Lančarič		Documentary	90 Minutes		
Enchanted Cave	Mariana Čengel Solčanská	Martina Zábranská, Petra Dubayová, Ondřej Kraus, Tatiana Pauhofová	Fantasy	102 Minutes	Czech Republic; Hungary	
Horse	Martin Šulík	Daniel Fischer, Branislav Bystriansky, Dominika Kavaschová	Comedy/Drama	80 Minutes	Czech Republic	
Lord of the Mountains' Secret	Peter Bebjak	David Švehlík, Leona Skleničková, Jan Nedbal, Martin Huba	Fantasy	99 Minutes	Czech Republic; Germany	
Mountain Guides	Pavol Barabáš	Ján Kořínek, Jaroslav Michalko, Pavel Rajtar	Documentary	69 Minutes		
Nightsiren	Tereza Nvotová	Natalia Germani, Eva Mores, Marek Geišberg	Drama/Horror	109 Minutes	Czech Republic	
Piargy	Ivo Trajkov	Judit Pecháček, Lucia Siposová, Attila Mokos	Drama	100 Minutes	Czech Republic; North Macedonia	
SCHEEP – (AN)REAL STORI	Peter Pavlík	Peter Pavlík, Katarína Smaczna, Klara Smaczna	Comedy/Drama	79 Minutes		
Shadowplay	Peter Bebjak	Milan Ondrík, Hynek Čermák, Vladimír Javorský	Thriller	103 Minutes	Czech Republic	Set to release in 2021, delayed due to COVID-19 pandemic
Superwoman	Karol Vosátko	Natálie Topinková, Renáta Ryníková, Zuzana Šebová	Comedy	108 Minutes		
The Cathedral	Denis Dobrovoda	Justo Gallego Martínez	Documentary	87 Minutes		
Till the Summer Comes	Marta Ferencová	Tereza Kostková, Marián Miezga, Dana Rogoz	Comedy	111 Minutes	Czech Republic	
Victim	Michal Blaško	Vita Smachelyuk, Gleb Kuchuk, Igor Chmela	Drama	92 Minutes	Germany; Czech Republic	2022 Sun in a Net Awards Best Film winner and Slovak entry for the Best International Feature Film at the 95th Academy Awards.
Welcome Home!	Peter Serge Butko	Róbert Jakab, Petra Polnišová, Anna Šišková	Comedy	104 Minutes		
2023
Emília	Martin Šulík	Emília Vášáryová, Magda Vášáryová, Božidara Turzonovová	Documentary	98 Minutes		
Grand Canyon	Pavol Barabáš	Peter Valušiak, , Tomáš Lukačovič, Robert Kazík	Documentary	64 Minutes		
Hanging Without Walls	Jana Durajová; Lena Kušnieriková		Documentary	78 Minutes		
Invalid	Jonáš Karásek	Gregor Hološka, Zdeněk Godla, Ivo Gogál	Comedy	108 Minutes		2023 Sun in a Net Awards Best Film winner
Neither With You	Tomáš Dianiška	Kristína Svarinská, Kryštof Hádek, Taťjana Medvecká	Romantic comedy	100 Minutes	Czech Republic	
Perinbaba: Two Realms	Juraj Jakubisko	Lukáš Frlajs, Valéria Frištik, Ivan Romančík	Fantasy	107 Minutes	Czech Republic	
Photophobia	Ivan Ostrochovský; Pavol Pekarčík	Nikita Tyshchenko	Documentary/Drama	71 Minutes	Czech Republic; Ukraine	Slovak entry for the Best International Feature Film at the 96th Academy Awards.
Handmaiden	Mariana Čengel Solčanská	Dana Droppová, Radka Caldová, Vica Kerekes	Drama	108 Minutes	Czech Republic	
Never Say Never	Branislav Mišík	Tereza Kostková, Tomáš Maštalír, Lenka Krobotová	Drama/Comedy	104 Minutes	Czech Republic	
Réveillon	Michal Kunes Kováč	Eva Holubová, Bolek Polívka, Anna Šišková,	Drama/Comedy	101 Minutes	Canada	
Three Golden Ducats	Mariana Čengel Solčanská	Katarína Krajčovičová, Ladislav Bédi, Jozef Vajda, Jitka Čvančarová	Fantasy	84 Minutes	Czech Republic	
We're Going to Team Building	Zuzana Marianková	Jakub Prachař, Vojtěch Kotek, Anna Polívková	Comedy	105 Minutes	Czech Republic	
You are the Bad Luck, Love	Samuel Spišák	Michaela Čobejová, Ivan Franěk, Leona Skleničková, Ady Hajdu	Romantic comedy	98 Minutes		
What Did You Do to the Russians?	Michal Fulier; Jana Bučka Kovalčíková		Documentary	90 Minutes		
2024
Cop War	Rudolf Biermann	Alexander Bárta, Juraj Loj, Rytmus	Thriller	151 Minutes	Czech Republic	
Fentasy	Samuel Vičan; Anastasia Hoppanová	Kristína Kanátová, David Švehlík, Noël Czuczor	Thriller	85 Minutes		
Kavej	Lukáš Zednikovič	Jana Kovalčiková, Anna Jakab Rakovská, Pavol Šimun	Comedy	111 Minutes		
Lóve 2	Jakub Kroner	Michal Nemtuda, Kristína Svarinská, Jakub Gogál	Thriller	100 Minutes		
Miki	Jakub Kroner	Milan Ondrík, Dušan Cinkota, Gregor Hološka	Thriller	110 Minutes	Czech Republic	
Nobody Likes Me	Petr Kazda, Tomáš Weinreb	Barbora Bobuľová, Hana Vagnerová, Mantas Zemleckas	Drama	105 Minutes	Czech Republic; France	
Ms. President	Marek Šulík	Zuzana Čaputová	Documentary	109 Minutes	Czech Republic	
Promise, I'll Be Fine	Katarína Gramatová	Michal Záchenský, Jana Oľhová, Eva Mores	Drama	91 Minutes	Czech Republic	
The Dormant Account	Miloslav Luther	Richard Autner, Dominika Morávková, Veronika Meszárosová	Drama	110 Minutes	Czech Republic	
The Hungarian Dressmaker	Iveta Grófová	Alexandra Borbély, Milan Ondrík, Nico Klimek, Lili Monori	Drama	129 Minutes	Czech Republic	Slovak entry for the Best International Feature Film at the 97th Academy Awards.
Space Cowboy	Lukáš Teren	Richard Krivda	Documentary	83 Minutes		
Via Slovakia	Víťazoslav Chrappa		Documentary	78 Minutes		
Whirlwind	Peter Bebjak	Aňa Geislerová, Tomáš Maštalír, Éva Bandor	Thriller	122 Minutes	Czech Republic	
Year of the Widow	Veronika Lišková	Pavla Beretová, Julie Šoucová, Zuzana Kronerová	Drama	108 Minutes	Czech Republic; Croatia	
2025
Another Round	Rudolf Biermann	Hana Vagnerová, Judit Pecháček, Alžbeta Ferencová	Comedy	119 Minutes	Czech Republic	
Better Go Mad in the Wild	Miro Remo	František Klišík, Ondřej Klišík	Documentary	84 Minutes	Czech Republic	
Černák	Jakub Kroner	Milan Ondrík, Dušan Cinkota, Gregor Hološka	Thriller	109 Minutes	Czech Republic	
Dream Team	Jonáš Karásek	Martin Hofmann, Jakub Prachař, Petra Polnišová	Comedy	127 Minutes	Czech Republic	
Duchoň	Peter Bebjak	Vladislav Plevčík, Anna Jakab Rakovská, Gregor Hološka	Drama	99 Minutes		
Father	Tereza Nvotová	Milan Ondrík, Dominika Morávková, Aňa Geislerová	Drama	103 Minutes		Slovak entry for the Best International Feature Film at the 98th Academy Awards.
Nepela	Gregor Valentovič	Josef Trojan, Zuzana Mauréry, Tereza Smetanová	Drama	114 Minutes	Czech Republic	
Open	Diana Fabiánová		Documentary	83 Minutes		
Perla	Alexandra Makárová	Rebeka Poláková, Noël Czuczor, Simon Schwarz	Drama	100 Minutes	Austria	
Secret Delivery	Ján Sebechlebský	Eliška Dytrychová, Theo Schaefer, Jakub Král	Drama	97 Minutes	Czech Republic; Serbia	
The Sluggard Clan	Rastislav Boroš	Milan Ondrík, Anežka Petrová, Milan Mikulčík	Comedy	98 Minutes	Czech Republic	
Flood	Martin Gonda	Sára Chripáková, Jozef Pantlikáš, Katarína Babejová	Drama	102 Minutes	Czech Republic; Poland; Belgium	Slovak entry for the Best International Feature Film at the 99th Academy Awards.
2026
The Cool Guys	Branislav Mišík	Martin Pechlát, Tomáš Jeřábek, Zuzana Šebová	Comedy	100 Minutes	Czech Republic	
General Golian	Juraj Štepka	Ondrej Hraška	Historical War Drama	133 Minutes	Czech Republic	Tells story of Ján Golian, commander of Slovak National Uprising.
Štúr	Mariana Čengel Solčanská	Lukáš Pelč, Ivana Kološová, Jana Kvantiková	Drama	111 Minutes		
Chaos Exigency	Márk Tóth	Gábor Scheer, Ádám Pataky, Roland Rédei	Thriller, Drama	112 Minutes	Hungary	
