= List of Slovak films =

This is a chronological list of films that make up the Cinema of Slovakia. There may be an early overlap especially between Slovak and Hungarian films when the two nations shared the Kingdom of Hungary, later between Slovak and Czech films when the two nations shared Czecho-Slovakia or Czechoslovakia. The list should attempt to document films that are either Slovak-produced or associated with Slovak culture. Please see the detailed A-Z of films currently covered on Wikipedia at Category:Slovak films, List of Czechoslovak films, and Category:Czech films.

== Before 1920 ==
Title	Director	Cast, notes	Genre	Year
A Camp of Zingari Gypsies		1-minute British short, unknown location in the Kingdom of Hungary	Documentary	1897
Traveling through the Váh Valley		— the Váh River	Travel	
Testing the Police Dogs in Bratislava		— Prešporok, now Bratislava	Newsreel	
Skiing at Tatranská Lomnica		— Tatranská Lomnica	Newsreel	
The Košice Institute of Corrections for Children		— Košice	Documentary	
The Košice Promenade on the Screen		— Košice	Travel	
A Trip to the Tatras		Including: Arriving at Štrbské Pleso, A View of the Ridge, Farewell	Travel	1918
Unveiling a Patriot Statue in Nitra		— statue by Sándor Finta	Newsreel	1918
Palm Sunday in Vajnory		Visit by Governor Vavro Šrobár	Newsreel	1919
The Red Army Victory Celebration in Košice		Including: Béla Kún: "Proletariat of Košice!" − Hungarian communist takeover of Košice	Newsreel	1919
Snowdrop from the Tatras	Olaf Larus-Racek	Ema Švandová-Kadlecová, Rudolf Kadlec; Czech-made with Slovak lead character, partly on location in Slovakia	Drama	1919

== 1920s ==
Title	Director	Cast, notes	Genre	Year
Jánošík	Jaroslav Jerry Siakeľ	Theodor Pištěk, Mária Fábryová	Drama	1921
Siciliana − Princess Kanningsten's Necklace	Imrich Darányi	Július Oláh, Ada Vojtíšková	Adventure	1921
Little Witch from the Grove	Ján Moncoľ	Zuzana Piaterová-Koniarová, Zuzana Bútorová	Drama	1922
Nosferatu	Friedrich Wilhelm Murnau	On location at Orava Castle, the High Tatras, the Váh near Strečno; no Slovak content	Horror	1922
Wallachian Year at Rožnov pod Radhoštěm	Cyril Kašpar	Produced by Tatrafilm Trenčín about Slovak-related Wallach culture in Moravia	Documentary	1925
Štrbské Pleso		Czech-produced	Travel	1925
Tracing the Slovak Folk	Karol Plicka	Non-actors	Documentary	1928
The High Tatras		Sponsored by the Masaryk Folk Educational Institute, Prague	Travel	1929
Through Mountains and Valleys	Karol Plicka	Non-actors	Documentary	1929

== 1930s ==
Title	Director	Cast	Genre	Year
Storm over the Tatras	Ferdinand Pujman, Tomáš Trnka	Synchronization of nature shots and music by Vítězslav Novák	Experimental	1932
Flowers in the Tatras			Nature	1932
The Earth Sings	Karel Plicka	Non-actors	Documentary	1933
The Tatras in the Sun, Fog, and Storm		Sponsored by the Masaryk Folk Educational Institute, Prague	Nature	1933
Jánošík	Martin Frič	Paľo Bielik, Zlata Hajdúková	Drama	1935
Tracing Slovaks from New York to the Mississippi	Karel Plicka	Non-actors	Documentary	1937

== 1940s ==
Title	Director	Cast, notes	Genre	Year
A Trip to the Tatras		Sponsored by Školfilm, Bratislava	Travel	1942
From the Tatras to the Sea of Azov	Július Kovačevič	Slovak Army progress on the Eastern Front	Documentary	1942
Life Is Rising from the Ruins	Ján Kadár	Kadár's first film	Documentary	1945
Diary from the Tatras			Travel	1946
Up the North Face of Kriváň	Karol Skřipský		Sports	1947
Beware...!	Martin Frič	Paľo Bielik, Július Pántik	Drama	1947
Wolves' Lairs	Paľo Bielik	Beta Poničanová, Jozef Budský	Drama	1948
The Devil's Wall	Václav Wasserman	Andrej Bagar, František Zvarík	Drama	1949
Road of Steel	Vladimír Bahna	Banská Štiavnica railroad	Documentary	1949
Cathy	Ján Kadár	Božena Obrnová, František Dibarbora	Comedy	1949

== 1950s ==
Title	Director	Cast	Genre	Year
Kathy	Ján Kadár	Božena Obrová, Július Pántik	Comedy	1950
Dam	Paľo Bielik	Alexander Kautnik, Gustáv Valach	Drama	1950
The Struggle Will End Tomorrow	Miroslav Cikán	Elo Romančík, Vladimír Petruška	Drama	1951
Young Hearts	Václav Kubásek	Karol Machata, Hana Kavalírová	Drama	1952
Rainbow Over Slovakia	Vladimír Bahna	feature-long	Documentary	1952
The Mountains Are Stirring	Paľo Bielik	Anton Tihelka, Oľga Adamčíková	Drama	1952
Hamlets Have Started Off	Paľo Bielik	Anton Thielka, Oľga Adamčíková	Drama	1952
Friday the 13th	Paľo Bielik	Ondrej Jariabek, Oľga Adamčíková	Comedy	1953
Unplowed Field	Vladimír Bahna	Samuel Adamčík, Frída Bachletová	Drama	1954
Native Country	Josef Mach	Heda Melicherová, Martin Ťapák	Musical	1954
Wooden Village	Andrej Lettrich	Samuel Adamčík, Andrej Bagar	Drama	1955
The Last Witch	Vladimír Bahna	Oľga Zöllnerová, Mikuláš Huba	Drama	1957
St. Peter's Umbrella	Vladislav Pavlovič, Frigyes Bán (Hungary)	Samuel Adamčík, Mari Töröcsik (co-production with Hungary)	Comedy	1958
Captain Dabač	Paľo Bielik	Ladislav Chudík, Hilda Augustovičová	Drama	1959

== 1960s ==
Title	Director	Cast	Genre	Year
The Sun in a Net	Štefan Uher	Marián Bielik, Jana Beláková	Drama	1963
Let the One Who Is without Sin...	Dimitrij Plichta	Ján Mistrík, Marie Málková	Drama	1963
The Case of Barnabáš Kos	Peter Solan	Josef Kemr, Jarmila Košťová	Drama	1965
The Shop on Main Street	Ján Kadár, Elmar Klos	Jozef Kroner, Ida Kamińska	Drama	1965
Sheriff Behind Bars	Dimitrij Plichta	Otakar Prajzner, Martin Štěpánek	Drama	1965
Contract with the Devil	Jozef Zachar	Martin Gregor, František Dibarbora	Drama	1967
Call of the Demons	Andrej Lettrich	Ladislav Chudík, Viliam Polónyi	Caper	1967
The Man Who Lies	Alain Robbe-Grillet (France)	Jean-Louis Trintignant, Zuzana Kocúriková (French co-production)	Drama	1968
The Gala in the Botanical Garden	Elo Havetta	Slavoj Urban, Nina Divíšková	Comedy	1969
322	Dušan Hanák	Václav Lohinský, Lucyna Winnicka	Drama	1969

== 1970s ==
Title	Director	Cast	Genre	Year
The Copper Tower	Martin Hollý Jr.	Štefan Kvietik, Ivan Rajniak	Drama	1970
See You in Hell, Friends	Juraj Jakubisko	Olinka Bérová, Nino Besozzi (premiered, not released)	Drama	1970
Eden and After	Alain Robbe-Grillet (France)	Catherine Jourdan, Pierre Zimmer (French co-production)	Drama	1970
If I Had a Rifle	Štefan Uher	Marián Bernát, Jozef Grát	Drama	1971
Pictures of the Old World	Dušan Hanák	Non-actors	Documentary	1972
Eagle Feather	Martin Hollý Jr.	Ivan Mistrík, Ivan Rajniak	Drama	1972
Red Wine I, II	Andrej Lettrich	Štefan Kvietik, Emília Vašáryová (TV, theatrical release 1976)	Drama	1972
Lilies of the Field	Elo Havetta	Lotar Radványi, Vladimír Kostovič	Drama	1973
Fever	Martin Hollý Jr.	Michal Dočolomanský, Gustáv Valach	Drama	1975
Pacho, the Highwayman of Hybe	Martin Ťapák	Jozef Kroner, Dušan Blaškovič	Comedy	1976
Rosy Dreams	Dušan Hanák	Juraj Nvota, Iva Bittová	Drama	1977
Winner	Dušan Trančík	Jaroslav Tomsa, Dagmar Kováčiková	Drama	1979
And I'll Run to the End of the World	Peter Solan	Aneta Lakatošová, Ivan Mistrík	Drama	1979

== 1980s ==
Title	Director	Cast	Genre	Year
Spadla z oblakov	Radim Cvrček	Zuzana Pravňanská	Fiction	1981
Night Riders	Martin Hollý	Radoslav Brzobohatý, Michal Dočolomanský, Soňa Valentová, Leopold Haverl	Historical, drama	1981
The Assistant	Zoro Záhon	Gábor Koncz	Drama	1982
She Grazed Horses on Concrete	Štefan Uher	Milka Zimková, Veronika Jelínková	Comedy, drama	1982
The Salt Prince	Martin Hollý	Libuše Šafránková, Karol Machata, Gábor Nagy, Jozef Kroner	Fairytale	1983
A Thousand-year-old Bee	Juraj Jakubisko	Štefan Kvietik, Michal Dočolomanský	Historical	1983
The Feather Fairy	Juraj Jakubisko	Giulietta Masina, Valerie Kaplanová, Soňa Valentová, Tobias Hoesl	Fairytale	1985
The Fountain for Suzanne	Dušan Rapoš	Eva Vejmělková, Jiří Bábek	Musical	1985
Freckled Max and the Spooks	Juraj Jakubisko		Comedy	1987

== 1990s ==
Title	Director	Cast	Genre	Year
Island of Long Ears	Jozef Slovák, Jozef Heriban	Marian Zednikovič, Marian Labuda, Barbara Philine	Comedy	1990
Private Lives	Dušan Hanák	Jana Šulcová, Magdaléna Vášáryová, Václav Helšus	Drama	1991
All Together (the Slovak Way)	Eva Štefankovičová	Events in 1990	Documentary	1991
Tenderness	Martin Šulík	Maria Pakulnisová, Gejza Benkő, Iva Bittová, György Cserhalmi	Drama	1992
It's Better to Be Rich and Healthy Than Poor and Sick	Juraj Jakubisko	Deana Horváthová, Dagmar Veškrnová, Juraj Kukura	Comedy	1992
The Fountain for Suzanne 2	Dušan Rapoš	Pavol Habera, Eva Vejmělková, Maroš Kramár	Musical	1992
Rochade	Peter Patzak	Michael York	Spy thriller	1992
Earthly Restlessness	Eduard Grečner	Marta Sládečková, Jana Nagyová, Michal Gučik	Drama	1993
Angel of Mercy	Miloslav Luther	Ingrid Timková, Juraj Šimko	Drama	1993
Everything I Like	Martin Šulík	Juraj Nvota, Gina Bellmanová, Zdena Studenková, Jiří Menzel	Drama	1993
On the Beautiful Blue Danube	Štefan Semjan	Juraj Johanides, Vladimír Hajdu, Sylvia Šuvadová	Comedy	1994
The Garden	Martin Šulík	Roman Luknár, Zuzana Šulajová	Drama	1995
Jašek's Dream	Eduard Grečner	Emil Horváth Jr., Zuzana Kapráliková, Branislav Mišík	Drama	1996
Suzanne	Dušan Rapoš	Eva Vejmělková, Maroš Kramár, Boleslav Polívka	Drama	1996
Blue Heaven	Eva Borušovičová	Zita Kabátová, Emília Vášáryová, Slávka Halčáková	Comedy	1997
Orbis Pictus	Martin Šulík	Dorota Nvotová, Marián Zednikovič, Július Satinský	Drama	1997
The Camp of Fallen Women	Laco Halama	Juraj Kukura, Dana Dinková, Hana Gregorová, Mahulena Bočanová	Drama	1997
Nejasná správa o konci sveta	Juraj Jakubisko		Drama	1997
Rivers of Babylon	Vladimír Balco	Andrej Hryc, Diana Mórová, Vladimír Hajdu	Political satire	1998
All My Loved Ones	Matej Mináč Czech Republic	Josef Abrahám, Jiří Bartoška, Libuše Šafránková	Drama	1999
The Fountain for Suzanne 3	Dušan Rapoš	Eva Vejmělková, Alessandro Coari, Marián Labuda	Musical	1999

Minority co-production participation:

Country	Title	Director	Cast	Genre	Year
(United Kingdom)	Ravenous	Antonia Bird	Guy Pearce, Robert Carlyle, David Arquette, Jeremy Davies	Comedy, horror	1999

== 2000s ==
- List of Slovak films of the 2000s

== 2010s ==
- List of Slovak films of the 2010s

== 2020s ==
- List of Slovak films of the 2020s
