= Branko (disambiguation) =

Branko is a South Slavic masculine given name.

Branko may also refer to:

- Branko (DJ), Portuguese DJ and record producer
- Branko (čelnik), Serbian nobleman
- Pavel Branko, Slovak film critic and translator
