= Gyula Bárdos =

Slovak member of Slovak National Council and ethnic Hungarian politician

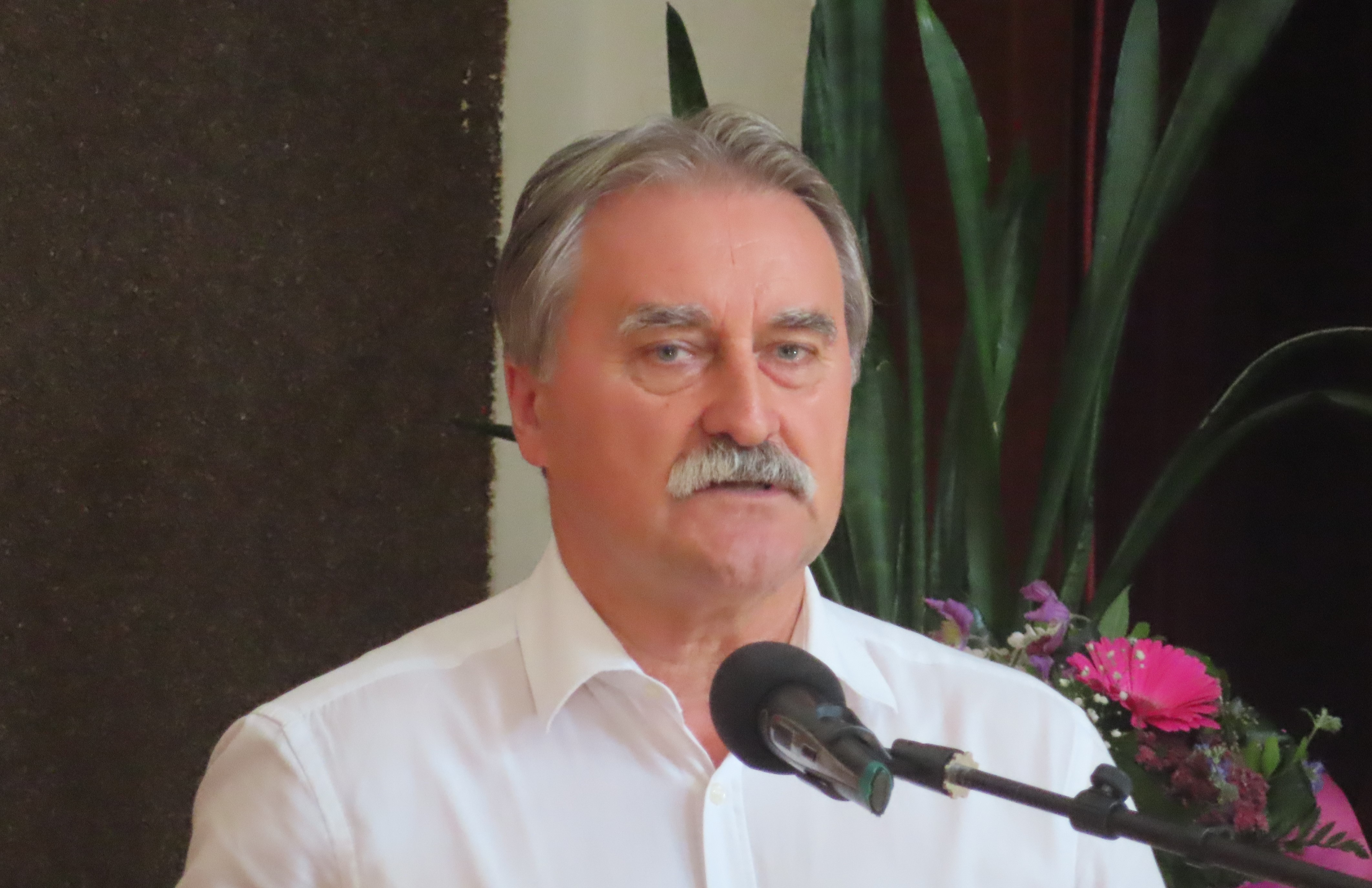

Member of the National Council
- In office 1994–2002

Personal details
- Born: 15 March 1958 (age 68) Bratislava, Czechoslovakia (present-day Slovakia)
- Party: Party of the Hungarian Community

Gyula Bárdos (born 15 March 1958) is an ethnic Hungarian journalist and politician in Slovakia, who was candidate in 2014 Slovak presidential election, running as a member of the Party of the Hungarian Community (SMK–MKP). He came in fifth with 5.1%.

Since 2012 he is the chairman of CSEMADOK, the largest cultural organization of Hungarians in Slovakia.

== Personal life ==
Bárdos lives in Senec. His wife Ágnes Bárdos is a journalist of the Hungarian section of RTVS. He has two daughters - Judit, who is an actress, and Kinga, who is a poet.
