= The Man Who Stood in the Way =

2023 historical drama film

- Theatrical release poster
- Directed by: Petr Nikolaev
- Written by: Ivan Fíla
- Based on: Muž, který stál v cestě by Ivan Fíla
- Produced by: Jan Vlček; Miloslav Šmídmajer
- Starring: Tomáš Töpfer
- Cinematography: Ramūnas Greičius
- Production company: Bio Illusion
- Distributed by: Bio Illusion
- Release date: 25 May 2023
- Running time: 120 minutes
- Countries: Czech Republic; Ukraine; Lithuania
- Language: Czech
- Budget: 64 Million CZK

The Man Who Stood in the Way (Czech: Muž, který stál v cestě, version in Ukrainian: «Вторгнення. Операція “Дунай”», romanized: Vtorgnennia. Operatsiia 'Dunai') is a 2023 historical drama film directed by Petr Nikolaev. The film focuses on František Kriegel, the only political leader who, during the Warsaw Pact invasion of Czechoslovakia, declined to sign the Moscow Protocol. It is based on a novel by Ivan Fíla of the same name. Fíla was originally set to direct the film.

== Cast ==
- Tomáš Töpfer as František Kriegel
- Zuzana Mauréry as Riva Kriegelová
- Adrian Jastraban as Gustáv Husák
- Alois Švehlík as Ludvík Svoboda
- Jiří Ployhar ml. as Oldřich Černík
- Dano Heriban as Alexander Dubček
- Přemysl Bureš as Josef Smrkovský
- Oleksandr Ihnatusha as Leonid Brezhnev
- Jaroslav Mendel as Vasiľ Biľak
- Miroslav Táborský as MUDr. Smrčka
- Zuzana Kajnarová as Zora Hynská
- Lukáš Kantor as Josef Špaček
- Antonín Kala as Drahomír Kolder

== Production ==
First preparations started in 2016 when Ivan Fíla was approached by producer Miloš Šmídmajer with idea to make a film about Kriegel. Fíla agreed and has written a book The man who stood in the way. Success of the book paved way to a film adaptation. Fíla was set to direct the film with Tomáš Töpfer set to star as Kriegel. Production was later stalled due to conflicts between Fila and Šmídmajer. In February 2020 Šmídmajer decided to replace Fíla with different director. Shooting started in November 2021 with Petr Nikolaev as the director. Shooting started in Kyiv. It was announced in August 2022 that the shooting is finished. On 31 March 2023 first trailer was released with the film premiere set for 25 May 2023.
