= Pavel Branko =

Slovak film critic, film theorist, translator and author

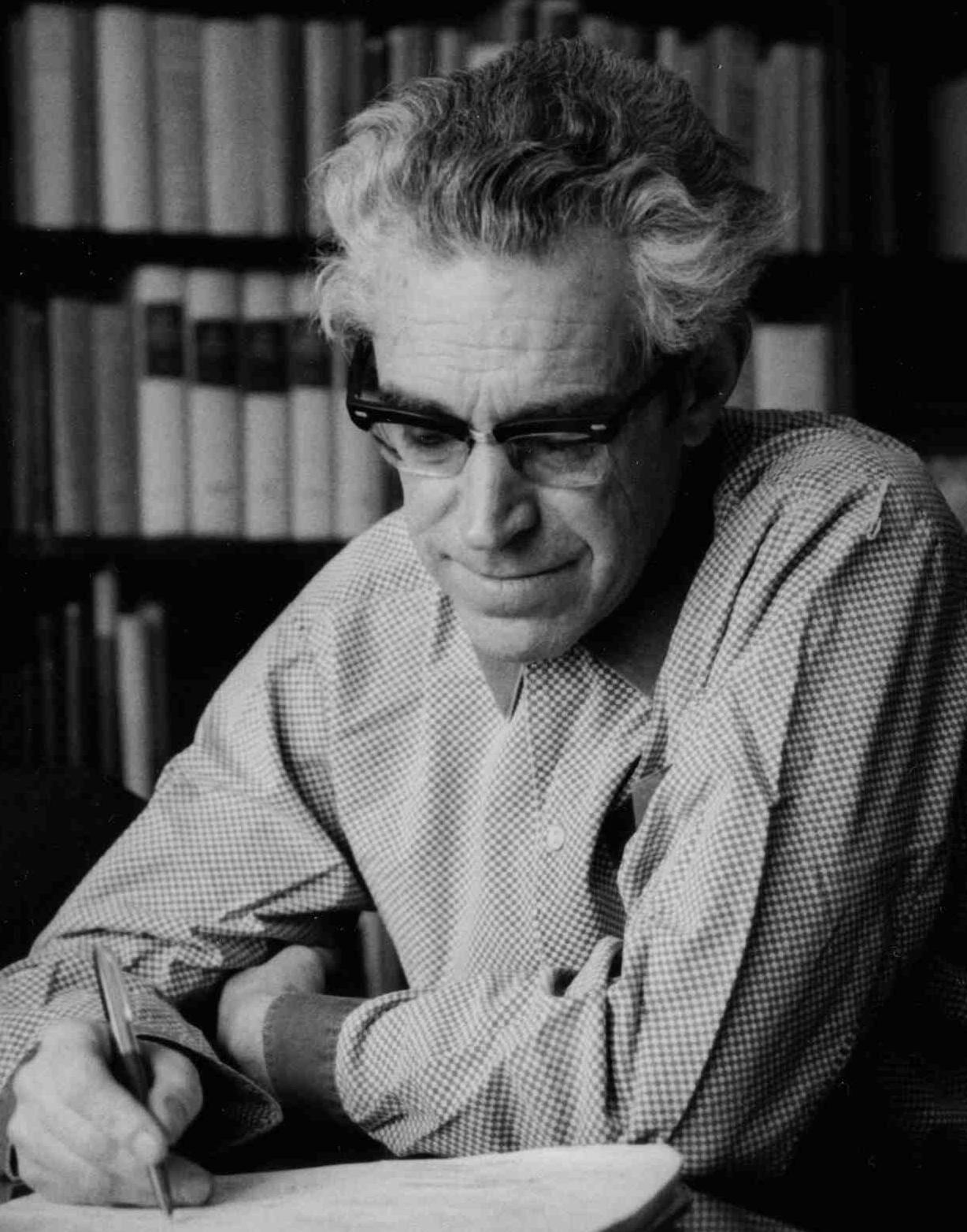
- Branko in 1977
- Born: 27 April 1921; Trieste, Italy
- Died: 17 August 2020 (aged 99)
- Occupation: film critic

Pavel Branko (27 April 1921 – 17 August 2020) was a Slovak film critic, film theorist, translator of fiction and non-fiction literature, and author of articles that critique questionable use of language. He has been called "the doyen of Slovak film criticism."

After the fall of real socialism, he has received many prizes that honour the man and the work of a lifetime. In his life and work we find many traces of the impact of the history of Czechoslovakia. Branko was married to Emilia Brankova.

== Life and work ==
=== Youth and early career ===
Pavel Branko was born on board a French ship heading to Trieste, a port city on the Adriatic Sea. His birthplace was registered as Trieste which had just reverted from Austrian rule to Italy. Branko's father was a Slovak Jew converted to Protestantism, a clerk in Hatshava (Hačava), Hnushtya (Hnúšťa) county, Slovakia and thus a citizen of Austria-Hungary, a multi-national state, till 1918. His mother was Russian.

Branko spent his childhood in Hatshava. He moved to Bratislava in 1931. Between 1932 and 1940, he attended high school in that city. After having obtained his high school diploma in 1940, he enrolled in the Technical University of Bratislava for 1940–41. The next year he was rejected because of the Jewish roots of his father. Then he had three short-lived jobs until the summer of 1942.

=== Political activity and imprisonment ===
The Slovak clerical-fascist regime of Jozef Tiso (which was noted for its Antisemitism) brought Branko into the resistance while he was still a high school student. In 1939, propelled by an "enthusiasm for leftist ideals", Branko joined the illegal Communist Party, the most outstanding antifascist force in Slovakia at the time.

His political activism ended abruptly in June 1942, when he was arrested along with four other party members. Soon after his arrest, he received a life sentence.

Between 1942 and 1945, Branko was a political prisoner in Bratislava, Nitra, and Leopoldov.

During the winter of 1945, fearing that the advancing Red Army could liberate the political prisoners, the Tiso regime made a dirty deal with the German Gestapo. The prisoners were formally released, but in fact transferred to the Gestapo directly at the front gate of Leopoldov prison. In this way, Branko was transferred together with many others to the Mauthausen concentration camp in February 1945. The three months in Mauthausen, until his liberation by the U.S. army in May 1945, were the hardest of the entire period of Pavel Branko's imprisonment.

=== Literary translation and film criticism ===
After liberation, Branko worked as a freelance translator of fiction, as well as philosophical non-fiction from English, Russian and German. From 1945 to 1949 he gradually became disillusioned with the real practices of the Communist Party and the Comintern which ended in his public withdrawal from the CP in 1949, with many consequences involved. His reputation as a former Resistance fighter and political prisoner saved him from significant criticism, and when he began to write film reviews, he quickly became a respected freelance film critic.

Between 1948 and 1952, his film reviews were published in many journals and daily newspapers, such as Kultúrny život (Cultural Life), Ľudovýchova (Vernacular Education), Náš film (Our Film), Pod zástavou socializmu (Under the Banner of Socialism), Práca (Labor), Pravda (Truth), Slovenská reč (Slovak Language), Slovenské pohľady (Slovak Views), Smena (Shift), Svet socializmu (World of Socialism) and others.

The year 1952 brought such a tightening of the ideological limits imposed that Branko's value hierarchy could not accept it. He decided to resign as a film critic and withdrew with his first wife Mary to a lonely cabin in the High Tatras, a mountain range in North-Eastern Slovakia, where he restricted himself to translating books.

In 1956, a year referred to as a "thaw" period, Pavel Branko returned to Bratislava, invited to assume a steady job as film editor of the newly founded bi-weekly journal Film a divadlo (Film and Theater).

Since 1956, Branko specialized in documentary film, attending regularly the short-film festivals in Karlovy Vary, Oberhausen, Leipzig and Cracow (occasionally as a jury member), as well as the national Pula Film Festival in Yugoslavia. In the 1950s, 60s, and early 1970s he published his reviews and essays mainly in Slovak and Czech. The Slovak media that published his film criticism in this period included Čítanie o ZSSR (Reading on USSR), Film a divadlo (Film and Theater), Kultúrny život (Cultural Life), Ľudovýchova (Vernacular Education), Mladá tvorba (The Young Generation), Národná obroda (National Revival), Nové slovo (New Word), Práca (Labor), Pravda (Truth), Predvoj (Vanguard), Príroda a spoločnosť (Nature and Society), Rodina a škola (Family and School), Slovenský rozhlas (Slovak Radio), Slovenka (Slovak woman), Slovenská reč (Slovak Language), Slovenské pohľady (Slovak Views), Slovenský jazyk a literatúra (Slovak Language and Literature), Smena (Shift), Svet socializmu (World of Socialism), Učiteľské noviny (The Teacher's Newspaper), Új szó (New Word – in Hungarian), Umelecké slovo (Word Art), Televízia, Večerník (The Evening Paper), and Život (Life). The Czech media included Czechoslovak Life, Divadelní a filmové noviny (Theatre and Film News), Estetika (Aesthetica), Film a doba (Film and Time), Filmové a televizní noviny (Film and Television News), Reportér, Rudé právo (Red Law), Plamen (Flame), and Tvorba (Creation).

Abroad he was occasionally published by Les Lettres Françaises (in France), by Telegram (Zagreb, Yugoslavia), and in Poland, by three renowned film journals: Ekran Warszawski (Warsaw Screen), Film polski (Polish Film), and Kamera. In West Germany, his film criticism appeared in Filmstudio, in East Germany in Filmspiegel (Film Mirror) and in Deutsche Filmkunst (German Film Art), in Sweden in Filmrutan (Movie Frame). In what was then the Soviet Union, two high quality film journals printed his film reviews: Iskusstvo kino (Film Art) and Sovetskij ekran (Soviet Cinema).

"As a publicist he was fully recognized in the sixties."

In 1968, while the Prague Spring was still flourishing, Branko was in charge of a seminar offered for budding screenwriters at the Academy of Performing Arts in Bratislava. In the summer of 1968, he was a member of a delegation of Slovak filmmakers and critics who came to Bochum, W.Germany, to show and discuss non-conformist Slovak films, including such films as Juraj Jakubisko's Deserters and Wanderers.

While being already a respected film critic, Branko continued to work as a literary translator. In 1967, he obtained honorary awards from the SÚKK and the SV ČSSP for his translation of Maxim Gorky's "Life of Klim Samgin" (Zhizn Klima Samgina / Жизнь Клима Самгина).

=== Blacklisting ===
In 1970, Pavel Branko resigned on his own accord as film editor of Film a divadlo (Film and Theater). This was two years before his official blacklisting. At the time, he found already that his convictions were irreconcilable with the political line (the so-called "normalization") imposed by the new editor-in-chief. All this was due to his support for and involvement in the movement that the media in the West referred to as the Prague spring. In 1970, Branko briefly managed to land a one-year job as scientific collaborator at the Slovak Film Institute (SFÚ). In 1973, being 52, he was forced into ‘retirement’ for good. This was, incidentally, also the time of his divorce. He married his second wife, Emily, in 1979.

As film critic he was blacklisted during the entire "normalization" period of real socialism (1972–89), and as translator from 1972 to 1978. From 1972 until 1976 he occasionally published film essays on uncontroversial topics. This was possible because friends and former colleagues agreed that he might use their name as a cover.

=== Later life ===
Between 1990 and 2007, Pavel Branko published film criticism in such journals and daily newspapers as Dialóg, Film.sk, Film a doba (Film and Time), Filmová revue, Kino-Ikon, Kultúrny život (Cultural Life), Mosty (Bridges), Nové slovo (New Word), Pravda (Truth), and Sme (We are), and on the air waves via Radio Free Europe.

== Honours ==
In 1997, he was awarded an honorary doctorate by the Academy of Performing Arts (VŠMU). Three years later, in 2000, various honorary prizes were bestowed on him by the SFZ, the ÚSTT, and the LFSR (Prémia SFZ, ÚSTT, LFSR ) for his collected works that contained much of his film criticism. The 3 volumes are titled Straty a nálezy (Lost and found), I, II, III.

Also in 2000, Pavel Branko was awarded the Zlatá kamera (Golden Camera) at the MFF Art Film Fest, together with a laudatory diploma by the Prime Minister. And in the same year, he received the prize Cena slovenskej filmovej kritiky (Prize of Slovak Film Criticism) for his Straty a nálezy, 1948 – 98.

In 2007 he received the Slnko v sieti (Sun in the net) Award of the Slovak Film and TV Academy for a lifetime's achievement (Cena Slnko v sieti za celoživotné dielo).

== Two Documentary Films about Pavel Branko ==
In 2009, the documentary filmmaker Zuzana Piussi (or Susan Piussi) made the documentary A Hero of our Time about Pavel Branko. The title refers to Lermontov's novel that depicts a "superfluous man" – a hint which serves to remind us that Branko sees himself ironically or skeptically as a ‘superfluous man.’ Indeed, neither the Tiso regime nor the Stalinists ‘needed’ somebody like him, who ‘swims against the current.’

In 2010 Jaro Rihák shot a portrait of Pavel Branko for the Slovak TV series GEN (Gallery of national elite).

== Death ==
Branko died in August 2020 at the age of 99.

== Selected list of publications by Branko ==
=== Books ===
- Pavel Branko, Od začiatkov po prah zrelosti slovenský film 1945–1970 (From the beginnings to the threshold of maturity – Slovak cinema 1945–1970). Bratislava (VŠMU / Academy for the Performing Arts) 1991; ISBN 80-85182-17-3.
- Pavel Branko, Mikrodramaturgia dokumentarizmu. Bratislava (Slovenský filmový ústav/Slovak Film Institute), 1991, 95pp.; ISBN 80-85187-00-0. – Micro-dramaturgy of documentary film; theoretical reflections.
- Pavel Branko, Straty a nálezy I, 1948 – 98 (Lost and found I, 1948 – 98). Bratislava (Filmová a Televízna Fak. VŠMU/Film and Television Dept., Academy for the Performing Arts; Národné centrum pre audiovizuálne umenie/National Center for Audiovisual Art) 1999. 225pp.; ISBN 80-85182-52-1. – A collection of film reviews published between 1948 and 1998 in various film journals and in the culture page of major daily newspapers.
- Pavel Branko, Straty a nálezy II, 1963–2005 (Lost and found 2, 1963–2005). Bratislava (FOTOFO; FTF VŠMU; Slovenský filmový ústav/SFÚ – Slovak Film Institute) 2005, 260 pp.; ISBN 80-85187-44-2. – Like Part 1 but short-film topics only.
- Pavel Branko, Straty a nálezy III, 1963–2007 (Lost and found 3, 1963–2007). Bratislava (FOTOFO, FTF VŠMU, SFÚ) 2007, 294 pp.; ISBN 978-80-85187-48-9. – Miscellanea.
- Pavel Branko, Proti prúdu (Against the Current). Bratislava (Marenčin PT/SFÚ) 2011, 219pp.; ISBN 978-80-8114066-2; 978-80-8518759-5 – Sociocritical autobiography.
- Pavel Branko. Úklady jazyka (Schemes of Language). Bratislava (MilaniuM/SFÚ) 2014, 270pp; ISBN 978-80-89178-54-4. – Playful and ironic comments on misunderstandings caused by literal transplantations that occur in the context of interaction between kindred languages.
- Pavel Branko. Úskalia a slasti jazyka (Cliffs and Delights of Language). Bratislava (MilaniuM/SFÚ) 2015. 311 pp; ISBN 978-80-89178-63-6. – Continuation of Schemes of Language, with more stress put on the critical sting directed against ways of masking hidden aims by using politically correct newspeak and euphemisms.
- Pavel Branko (interviewed by Iris Kopcsayová), Ráno sa zobudím a nie som mŕtvy : Rozhovory o láske a sexe, o bohu a smrti, ale aj o Trumpovi a populačnej explózii (In the Morning I Wake Up, Not Being Dead – Conversations on love and sex, on god and death, and other themes, including Trump and the population explosion). Bratislava (Marenčin PT/SFÚ) 2016; ISBN 978-80-8114-737-1.
- Pavel Branko, Gegen den Strom (German translation of Proti prúdu). Wien: New Academic Press; [2018]. ISBN 978-3-7003-2004-3; 3-7003-2004-3.
- Pavel Branko, Úlety a istoty jazyka (Somersaults and Certainties of Language). Bratislava (MilaniuM/SFÚ) 2018. 167pp; ISBN 978-80-89178-71-1. – Drawn up in the spirit of Cliffs and Delights of Language, enriched by a selection of aphorisms characterized by black humor, by playing on words, persiflages – and parodies – of proverbs, ballads and myths.

=== Articles by Branko that can also be accessed online ===
- Úklady jazyka alebo slovgličtina (Schemes of the Language or Slovenglish), A series of articles published in: Romboid (A literary monthly magazine, ISSN 0231–6714). – In the years 2004–2010 (volumes 39 – 45) regularly every month, since 2012 intermittently. The articles that appeared in volumes 2004–2010 are accessible completely on the website

=== Literary works translated by Branko (A Selection) ===
NOTE: Publishers in Czechoslovakia did not make use of ISBN or ISSN before 1990.

- Maxim Gorkij (Maxim Gorky), Klim Samgin I-II (The Life of Klim Samgin) – Orig.: Žizň Klima Samgina I-IV; Z rus. orig. prel. a štúdiu napísal Pavel Branko (transl. from the Russian by Pavel Branko). Bratislava (Tatran) 1967. Vol. 1, 989 pp., Vol. 2, 801 pp.- (Check the database of the National Library of the Czech Republic .)
- Alexej Tolstoj (Alexey Tolstoy), Krížová cesta (trilógia: I.-IIII) (The Road to Calvary). – Orig.: Choždenije po mukam I-III; z rus. orig. prel. Pavel Branko (transl. from the Russian by Pavel Branko); štúdiu nap. Ivan Slimák; ilustr. Ľudovít Ilečko. Bratislava (SVKL) 1956; 944pp. – 2nd edition 1960; 3rd edition 1965. (Check the database of the National Library of the Czech Republic .)
- Othar Čiladze (Otar Chiladze), Kam ideš, človek... (Where are you going, man ..), transl. by Pavel Branko. Bratislava (Tatran) 1985. 531pp.
- Jack London, Volanie divočiny (The Call of the Wild); Biely Tesák (White Fang); Morský vlk (The Sea Wolf); úvod. štúdia Viktor Krupa; z angl. orig. prel. Pavel Branko (transl. from the English by Pavel Branko). Bratislava (Tatran) 1979. 508 pp.
- Jack London, Elam Ohnivák (Burning Day), transl. by Pavel Branko; Železná päta (The Iron Heel), transl. by Štefan Kýška. Bratislava (Tatran) 1980. In this combination: 1st edition.
- Bertolt Brecht, Rozhovory utečencov (orig. German title: Flüchtlingsgespräche; English title: Refugee Conversations), transl. by Pavel Branko. In: Revue svetovej literatúry (Revue of World Literature), Vol.26, No.6, 1990, pp. 136–147.
