= 2014 Slovak presidential election =

- 15 March 2014 (first round); 29 March 2014 (second round)
- Turnout: 43.39% (first round) ▼0.23pp 50.47% (second round) ▼1.18pp
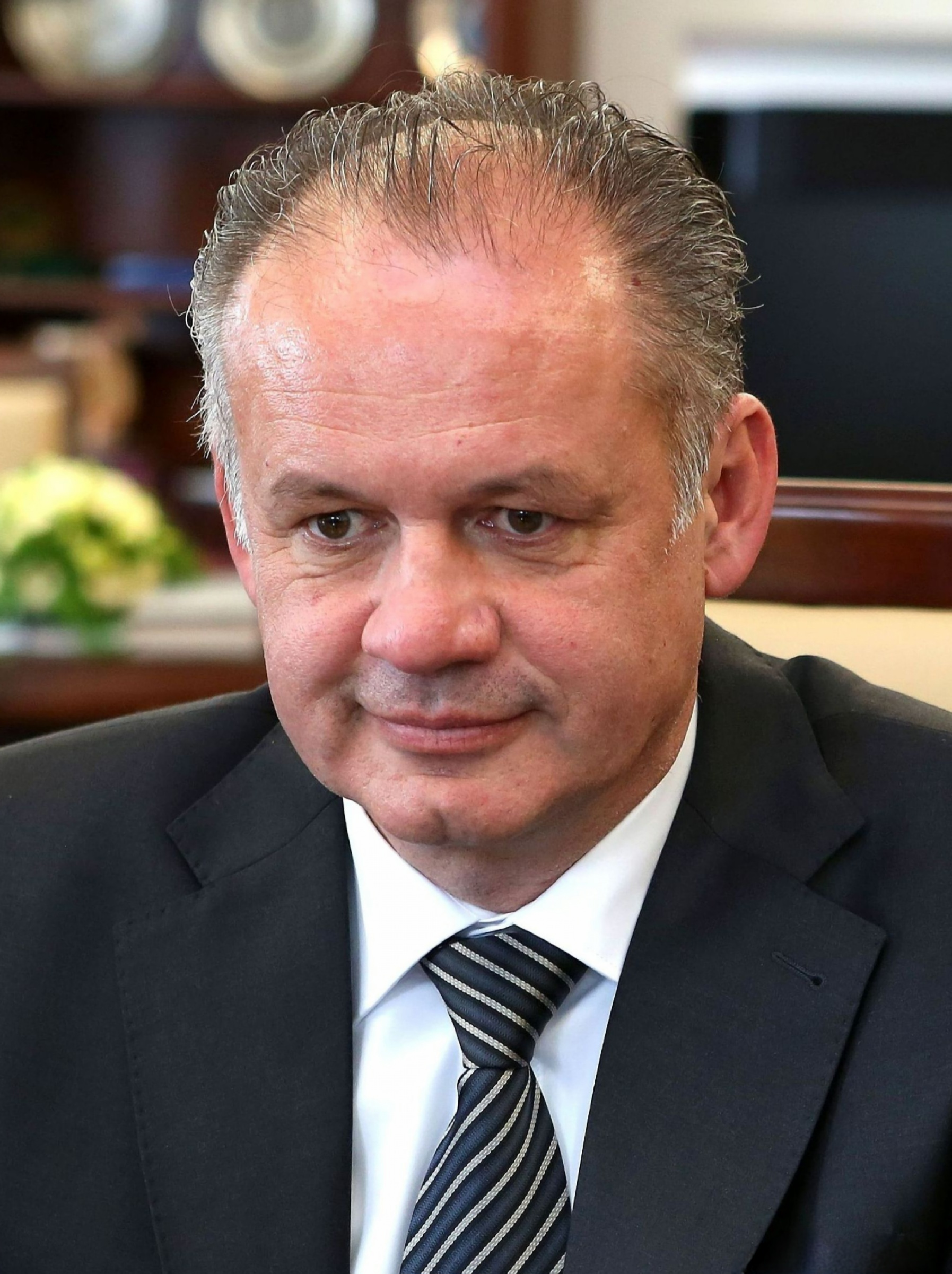

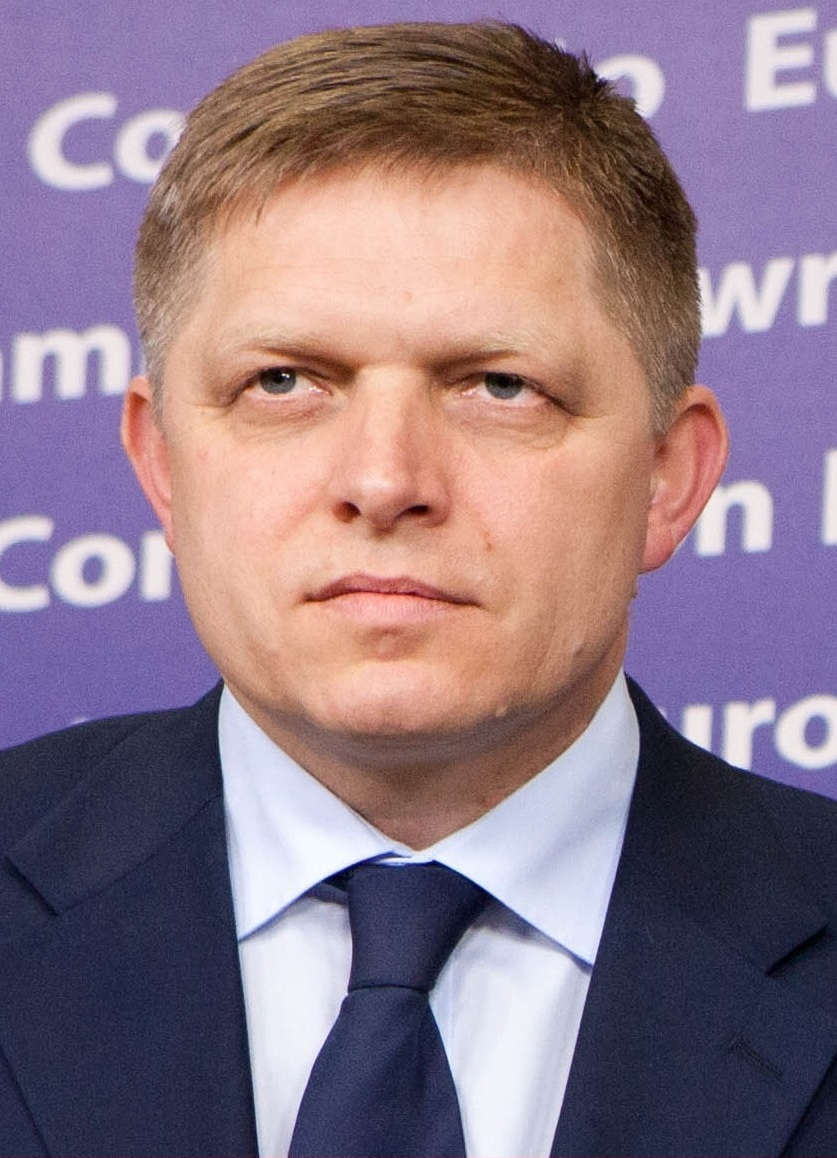
Nominee	Andrej Kiska	Robert Fico
Party	Independent	Smer
Popular vote	1,307,065	893,841
Percentage	59.39%	40.61%
President before election
Ivan Gašparovič
Independent
Elected President
Andrej Kiska
Independent

Presidential elections were held in Slovakia on 15 March 2014, with a second round on 29 March 2014.

After a first round in which no candidate secured majority, Robert Fico and Andrej Kiska qualified for the second round. On 29 March 2014 Kiska won the second round with 59% of the vote to Fico's 41%.

Kiska succeeded incumbent Ivan Gašparovič, who was unable to run due to term limits established by the Constitution.

== Candidates ==
All candidates who wished to contest the presidency were required to collect no less than 15.000 individual signatures in order to qualify for the race. In addition they had to officially submit their candidacy to the election commission in writing no later than 9 January 2014. At least one would-be candidate, Leonid Chovanec, a citizen from Košice who intended to run as an independent candidate, gave up his candidacy on January 6 citing "unequal conditions for people in their access to the candidacy for the post of president”. He did not manage to collect the 15,000 signatures to support his presidential bid. On January 9, Speaker of parliament Pavol Paska officially announced that the following candidates had been approved.

- Gyula Bárdos – member of the Party of the Hungarian Community
- Jozef Behýl – businessman and civil activist
- Ján Čarnogurský – former chair of the Christian Democratic Movement
- Robert Fico – incumbent prime minister, nominee of Direction – Social Democracy
- Viliam Fischer – cardiovascular surgeon
- Pavol Hrušovský – conservative politician of Christian Democratic Movement
- Ján Jurišta – former ambassador to Argentina, supported by the Communist Party of Slovakia
- Andrej Kiska – former businessman and philanthropist
- Milan Kňažko – actor and leader of the Velvet Revolution
- Stanislav Martinčko – businessman and chair of the Coalition of Citizens of Slovakia
- Milan Melník – scientist in coordination and bioinorganic chemistry
- Helena Mezenská – MP for the Ordinary People and Independent Personalities
- Radoslav Procházka – constitutional lawyer and former member of the Christian Democratic Movement
- Jozef Šimko – mayor of Rimavská Sobota

Withdrawn candidates

- Ľubica Blašková – entered the presidential race on 7 April 2013, but stepped down on 9 January 2014.
- Peter Osuský – entered the race on 12 June 2013, but withdrew on 29 January 2014 and his nominational party Freedom and Solidarity then favourised Radoslav Procházka.

== Campaign ==
The political right was fragmented; the People's Platform (an alliance of three right-wing parties) failed to agree on a common candidate. Christian Democratic Movement and Most-Hid announced that they supported Pavol Hrušovský, but the third party, Slovak Democratic and Christian Union – Democratic Party (SDKÚ-DS) originally refused to agree. According to multiple sources, SDKÚ would have preferred former Prime Minister Iveta Radičová as their candidate, however, she made clear that she did not want to run for president again. Later, after Fico announced its candidacy, SDKÚ-DS eventually decided to support Hrušovský. Shortly before first round of elections some members of SDKÚ-DS and Most-Híd suggested their supporters should choose different candidate in the upcoming elections, following polls which gave Hrušovský only small chance of progressing to second round.

=== Robert Fico ===
The ruling Smer party selected incumbent Prime Minister Robert Fico as its official candidate. According to opinion polls, Fico dominated his opponents, who were divided, and he would advance to the second round with a double digit lead. In addition, polls showed that he was most likely to win the presidential election. However, his party would have had to replace him as PM and party leader, meaning that Smer would have had to produce a popular and credible leader to follow Fico. As early as February, Fico was endorsed by the National trade union center when the Confederation of Labour Unions (KOZ) officially called upon its members to vote for Prime Minister Robert Fico.

In a promotional video during presidential election campaign in 2014, Fico said he grew up in a Roman Catholic family and that he considers himself a Catholic. He discussed his baptism, holy communion, confirmation and how the Catholic faith had impacted his childhood.

=== Andrej Kiska ===
Andrej Kiska was the first candidate to officially announce his presidential candidacy and his billboards appeared around Slovakia long before the names of his competitors were known. He was officially running as an independent candidate and had no political background whatsoever. Prior to the first round Kiskas campaign mostly stressed his independence, including his financial independence, which mean that he didn't have to report to any political parties. Furthermore, he promoted his lack of political involvement as one of his strengths, while his website featured the slogan “The First Independent President”. Eventually, Andrej Kiska won the election on 29 March with nearly 60% of the popular vote, becoming the first president in the history of Slovak republic never to have been a member of the Communist Party, nor any other political party.

=== Radoslav Procházka ===
The young constitutional lawyer Prochazka, who campaigned as the conservative candidate, was formerly a member with the Christian Democratic Movement (KDH), but ran as an independent. His campaign mainly targeted the large catholic population, with issues such as abortion, same-sex marriage and traditional family values. His campaign also stressed his youth as a strength, as well as his background as a constitutional lawyer, with his official slogans reading: "A young president? Why not!" (Slovak: Mladý prezident? Prečo nie!) and "Strong president. I will protect your rights!" (Slovak: Silný prezident. Budem chrániť vaše práva!)

=== Peter Osuský ===
The Freedom and Solidarity (SaS) party announced on 11 June 2013 that Peter Osuský would be their candidate for the presidency. Due to poor results in polls, Osuský decided to pull off his candidature. SaS reacted by supporting Radoslav Procházka for upcoming first round of elections.

=== Second round ===
During the second round all independent candidates and some right-wing parties supported Kiska. These candidates secured more than 60% votes including the ones received by Kiska in first round. Fico secured 12% more votes than in the first round. High turn out in second round helped Kiska defeat Fico by 20 points.

The second round of the election, which pitted Robert Fico against Andrej Kiska, saw the candidates engage in a series of televised presidential debates. Fico repeatedly accused Kiska of having links to the Church of Scientology, but stopped short of calling him a member. Kiska however, confirmed his Catholic faith, and filed criminal charges against Fico. All the defeated candidates from the first round subsequently backed Kiska, while international social-democrats such as French president Francois Hollande and Speaker of the European Parliament Martin Schultz endorsed Fico.

== Opinion polls ==
=== First round ===
Date	Agency	Ján Čarnogurský	Robert Fico	Pavol Hrušovský	Andrej Kiska	Milan Kňažko	Peter Osuský	Radoslav Procházka
1/2013	MVK	9.5 %	29.0 %	11.7%	5.8 %	–	–	–
5/2013	MVK	17.2%	41.9 %	–	13.3 %	–	2.8 %	16.4 %
7/2013	MVK	11.2 %	43.6 %	15.0 %	11.8 %	–	2.8 %	15.6%
7/2013	Focus	5.2 %	36.3 %	13.4 %	18.9%	–	1.1 %	5.8 %
7/2013	Polis	11.8 %	44.6 %	15.2%	9.6 %	–	4.0 %	14.8 %
9/2013	Focus	8.8 %	38.4 %	17.3 %	20.0%	–	3.8 %	11.7 %
10/2013	MVK	8.9 %	37.9 %	17.6 %	13.2 %	–	4.4 %	18.1%
10/2013	Focus	7.7 %	37.8 %	17.9%	17.6 %	–	3.9 %	15.1 %
11/2013	Focus	5.9%	36.9%	15.6%	17.9%	7.2%	4.2%	10.3%
2/2014	Focus	1.7%	37.0%	7.3%	20.4%	12.9%	–	10.3%
3/2014	Polis	2.5%	37.8%	5.2%	26.4%	11.2%	–	8.1%
3/2014	Election	0.6%	28.0%	3.3%	24.0%	12.9%	-	21.2%

=== Second round ===
Date	Agency	Robert Fico	Andrej Kiska
10/2012	Focus	26.4	28.0
11/2013	Focus	49.0	51.0
1/2014	Focus	46.3	53.7

== Results ==
Second round results by regions: Andrej Kiska Robert Fico

First round results by regions: Robert Fico Andrej Kiska

First round results by districts: Robert Fico Andrej Kiska Radoslav Procházka Milan Kňažko Gyula Bárdos

Candidate	Party	First round		Second round	
Candidate	Party	Votes	%	Votes	%
Robert Fico	Direction – Social Democracy	531,919	28.01	893,841	40.61
Andrej Kiska	Independent	455,996	24.01	1,307,065	59.39
Radoslav Procházka	Independent	403,548	21.25		
Milan Kňažko	Independent	244,401	12.87		
Gyula Bárdos	Party of the Hungarian Community	97,035	5.11		
Pavol Hrušovský	KDH, SDKÚ–DS, Most	63,298	3.33		
Helena Mezenská	Independent	45,180	2.38		
Ján Jurišta	Communist Party of Slovakia	12,209	0.64		
Ján Čarnogurský	Independent	12,207	0.64		
Viliam Fischer	Independent	9,514	0.50		
Jozef Behýl	Independent	9,126	0.48		
Milan Melník	Independent	7,678	0.40		
Jozef Šimko	Party of Modern Slovakia	4,674	0.25		
Stanislav Martinčko	Coalition of Citizens of Slovakia	2,547	0.13		
Total		1,899,332	100.00	2,200,906	100.00
Valid votes		1,899,332	99.27	2,200,906	98.97
Invalid/blank votes		14,037	0.73	22,906	1.03
Total votes		1,913,369	100.00	2,223,812	100.00
Registered voters/turnout		4,409,793	43.39	4,406,261	50.47
Source: Statistics.sk
