= The Earth Sings =

- Zem spieva
- Directed by: Karel Plicka
- Produced by: Ladislav Kolda
- Cinematography: Karel Plicka
- Edited by: Karel Plicka
- Release date: 1933
- Running time: 64 minutes
- Country: Czechoslovakia

Zem spieva (The Earth Sings) is a Slovak a documentary etnographic film directed and edited by photographer, cinematographer and etnographer Karol Plicka.

== Plot ==
The basic plot of the film is rural life in Slovakian countryside near Tatra mountains, with its constant natural cycle from the end of winter to autumn. At the time, it was a unique documentary that was completely different from other films being made at the time.

== Production ==
Film was produced by producer Ladislav Kolda from Zlin film studios. In addition to Lloyd Production Company, Matica slovenská also participated in the production, and the film was supported by the then President of Czechoslovakia, Tomáš Garrigue Masaryk. The original negative of the film was destroyed in a fire at the Zlín film studios in 1944.

In 1983 the film was restored by Martin Slivka in Slovak Film Institute.
