= Judit Pecháček =

Slovak actress

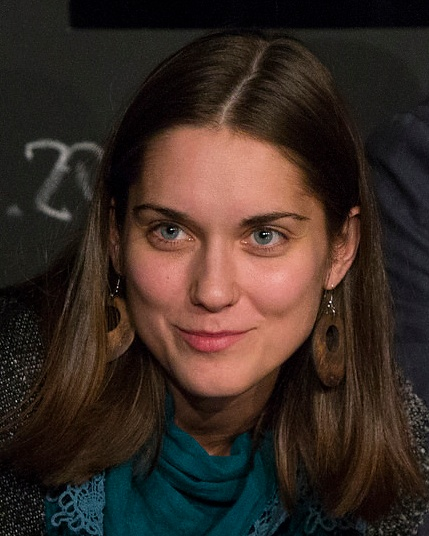
- Pecháček in 2016
- Born: Judit Bárdos; 12 May 1988 (age 38); Bratislava, Czechoslovakia
- Education: VŠMU
- Occupation: Actress
- Years active: 2011–present
- Spouse: Miloslav Pecháček (m. 2022)

Judit Pecháček (née Bárdos; born 12 May 1988) is a Slovak actress of Hungarian ethnicity. She is the daughter of politician Gyula Bárdos and journalist Ágnes Bárdos. Bárdos won the Best Actress Award at the 2012 The Sun in a Net Awards for her performance in the 2011 film The House. In 2018, she won Best Supporting Actress Award at The Sun in a Net Awards for her role in Out.

== Personal life ==
Her father Gyula Bárdos is a politician and the chairman of CSEMADOK. Her mother Ágnes Bárdos is a journalist of the Hungarian section of RTVS. She has a sister Kinga, who is a poet.

She lives in Prague. In 2022 she has married Czech cameraman and actor Miloslav Pecháček, and took his surname.

== Selected filmography ==
- The House (2011)
- Fair Play (2014)
- In Silence (2014)
- Svět pod hlavou (television, 2017)
- Out (2017)
- Sunset (2018)
- The Grandson (2022)
- The Last Race (2022)
- Secret Delivery (2025)
