= Zuzana Liová =

Slovak film director and screenwriter (born 1977)

- Born: 7 October 1977 (age 47); Žilina, Czechoslovakia
- Occupation(s): Director, Screenwriter
- Years active: 2000-present

Zuzana Liová (born 7 October 1977) is a Slovak film director and screenwriter. Her first television film, Ticho, was broadcast on Slovenská televízia in December 2005. Her directorial debut was the 2011 film The House, which she also wrote. The House won six awards at the 2012 Sun in a Net Awards including Best Film, and Liová herself for Best Screenplay.

== Selected filmography ==
=== Director ===
- Ticho (TV film, 2005)
- The House (2011)
- Slovensko 2.0 (2014)
