= Marek Geišberg =

Slovak actor (born 1982)

- Born: 4 May 1982 (age 42); Rimavská Sobota, Czechoslovakia
- Occupation: Actor
- Years active: 1991–present

Marek Geišberg (born 4 May 1982) is a Slovak actor. He was born in the town of Rimavská Sobota, and studied at the Academy of Performing Arts in Bratislava. Geišberg won the Best Supporting Actor award at the Sun in a Net Awards in 2012 for his role in The House. He is the son of Slovak actor Marián Geišberg.

== Selected filmography ==
- Music (2008)
- The House (2011)
- The Confidant (2012)
- Tenkrát v ráji (2016)
