= Zuzana Piussi =

Slovak filmmaker and actress

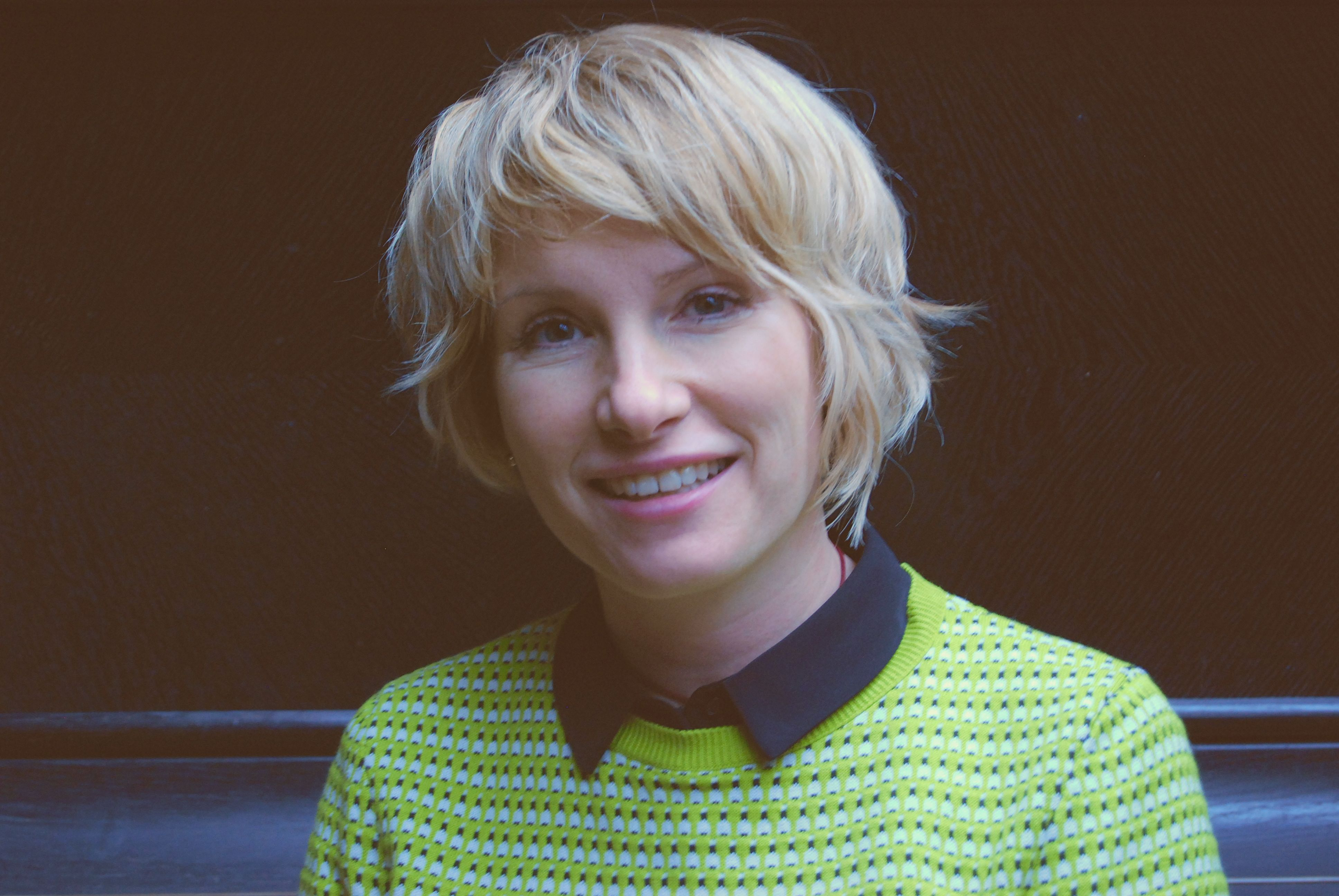
- Born: October 21, 1971 (age 54); Bratislava, Slovakia
- Occupation: film director

Zuzana Piussi (born 21 October 1971 in Bratislava) is a Slovak director and documentary filmmaker, as well as an actress. She graduated from the Department of Directing at the Film and Television Faculty of the Academy of Performing Arts in Bratislava. From 1992 to 2000, she worked with the theater Stoka. Subsequently, she was involved in the theater project SkRAT.

== Piussi's start as a documentary filmmaker ==
Piussi's first documentary, Výmet (Wipe out) (2003) received a major trophy at the IFF in Beirut, Lebanon's oldest and best-known film festival and one of the important Arab film festivals. Two years later, her documentary feature "Anjeli plačú" (Angels Cry) (2005) was the favorite of cineasts at the International Documentary Film Festival in Jihlava (Czech Republic) and earned her the "Audience Award."

In 2008, Piussi's semi-documentary Babička (Grandmother) received media attention because it told the story "of an aging woman" who does not "want to give up love life." Her ad lets her meet young men.

A year later, the filmmaker tackled a traumatic topic with her documentary Koliba (2009). The film focuses on the scandalous way Koliba, the Slovak national film studios, were privatized and stolen away.

In that same year, Susan Piussi also created a portrait of Pavel Branko entitled Hrdina našich čias (A Hero of Our Time). The title refers to Lermontov's novel and Branko's view of himself as "a superfluous man."

== The Disease of the Third Power ==
In 2011, she made the documentary film Disease of the Third Power that explores the current state of affairs at the top level of the Slovak judiciary. Claiming breach of confidentiality because her voice was heard and because her (blurred) face was seen in the documentary, Judge Helena Kožíková demanded compensation of 30 thousand euros. As The Slovak Spectator noted, Kožíková is "a former member of the Judicial Council, Slovakia's top judicial body." The prosecution started a protracted investigation, charging "violation of confidentiality of verbal expression in an (allegedly) private conversation." In October 2012, Czech artists declared their support for the filmmaker, petitioning Robert Fico, the Prime Minister of Slovakia: "Mr. Fico, let Susan Piussi alone!" According to the Bratislava ''SME'' (newspaper), "about seventy artists, many of them in the past dissidents and political prisoners, responded to the fact that the filmmaker is facing imprisonment for a documentary about the Judiciary (...)."

The case of the filmmaker was taken up by the Czech Foreign Minister Karel Schwarzenberg. "She has made a great movie," he said. "If you will be punishing her for it, you go back 25 years in time," he said. Citing the SITA news agency, SME reported on November 16, 2012 that the Ministry of Justice had stopped the charge against Susan Piussi. Three days later, the Prague daily Respekt published an article entitled "The crooked judges of Slovakia." Piussi was facing the possibility of two years in jail plus compensation payment to judge Kožíková, the press reported. When prosecution was still carrying on the investigation after two years and three months without tangible results, this was criticized in the press as a form of "bullying" the film director. In December 2012, SME reported that members of Parliament were invited to see "The Disease of the Third Power" but few came, among them MEP Andrej Hrnčiar from Most who said that the current situation in the judiciary brings to mind the period of 'Meciarism'. In January 2013, the police investigation against Piussi was stopped. According to the film director, this was due to pressure from the media and the fact that nearly 3,000 people signed a petition.

== From Fico to Fico and Fragile Identity ==
Despite the pressure inflicted on her, Piussi made two documentaries in 2012, Od Fica do Fica (From Fico to Fico) and Krehká identita (Fragile Identity), which is about the appearance or re-emergence of a questionable "nationalism" in multi-lingual and multi-cultural Slovakia. As Kristína Kúdelová pointed out, From Fico to Fico is a film that "explores the organizational background of the Gorilla protests" in Slovakia whereas Fragile Identity "was looking for the reason why idealistic patriotism turns into a dangerous nationalism (...)."

The film From Fico to Fico was rejected by Slovak multiplex cinemas but could finally be screened in smaller film theaters and it is also available on the Internet. Available on the internet, From Fico to Fico immediately found a large audience. According to Denisa Štrbová, "the new film is even more controversial than the previous one." She quoted Filip Kršák, spokesman of DAFilms, as saying that "this film is a fundamental report about present Slovakia and unfortunately not an optimistic one. The film is the director's response to all who wanted to silence her."

In view of the filmmaker's penchant to tackle risky subjects, Zuzana Mojžišová called Susan Piussi the "Guerilla Girl of Slovak film" in a review that appeared in the Slovak weekly .týždeň.

In December 2012, From Fico to Fico won the SME survey that determined the most significant cultural event of the year, in the category film. The two documentary films completed by her in 2012 (Disease of the Third Power and Fragile Identity) also reached rank 4 and 5 respectively in a survey of nearly 300 people who work professionally in the field of culture.

Still in December 2012, Fragile Identity won the first prize in the 13th documentary film festival Jeden svet (One World), 2012.

In 2013, Piussi received the Andrej Stankovič Prize for her most recent documentary, "Fragile Identity."

== How Piussi works ==
=== as revealed in an interview ===
In an interview with Susan Uličianska, Piussi notes that she is making "creative documentaries" (that is to say, art films, and not documentations for television): "I make my films as a provocation. The movie has to have humor.... Even in Stoka (the theater she worked with) there was often laughter through tears." "(A) documentary can only arise when people are open." Regarding the film "From Fico to Fico" that features the Gorilla protests while attempting to explore their organizational background, she says, "A scene from the film, in which people gathered on the central square trying to debate issues of national defense and economic growth, resembled surreal poetics of the Stoka theater. It's my favorite scene. It shows how the heterarchic system in Slovakia works when people have to agree on something. Scenes like this cannot be invented, they simply inspire you and you capture them. ... Maybe I'm strange, but I want to be constantly surprised. Some believe in the brain and their ego and [maybe] someone is really so smart that it all works out exactly as he planned. I obviously am not narcissistic enough, I am a seeker. If something arouses my interest, I let things develop freely as in love. If I see that I have captured something essential, I integrate it into the picture."

To the interviewer's interjection that somebody could comment: this is "a typically feminine way of thinking," Piussi responds, "I am glad to have a feminine way of thinking and seeing. Nevertheless I am sure that if such documentaries were done by men, they would be more accepted." (The second part of that sentence makes the assessment 'feminine' relative: it implies that men can and perhaps should work like that, too.)

The interview reveals that sometimes others accuse Piussi of not knowing enough about what she is filming, of not having a clear understanding. She says: "Listening to all those interviews with artists on radio Devín, it is clear to me that you have to present yourself, talk in this academic tone. But I reject this kind of wisdom, and people take me then for being stupid. After all, you do not even know what you filmed!, they tell me." This is perhaps because Piussi refuses to start with preconceptions and because she leaves many things 'open' in her documentaries, so that people can see them and make up their own mind. Searching for the truth is important. Of Michael Moore she says politely that he "is a brilliant filmmaker", but then adds, "In my opinion, he manipulates the truth." She also makes clear that what she rejects as a filmmaker and citizen is – stereotypes: "We are swamped under a heap of prejudices!" Film, for her, is a way to challenge prejudice.

=== as revealed by the analysis of a film critic ===
What Krekovič, a film critic writing for SME, has to say about Piussi's film Koliba also reveals something about her method or way of working as a documentary filmmaker. Krekovič notes that filmmakers bear part of the guilt, too, having failed to prevent the privatization with its disastrous ending, and then continues: "Zuzana Piussi is looking for an answer to that question. It is strange to look at her. The frail woman wandering around on the grounds of the former studios, stumbling on red high heels and questioning those who could have something to say about the case. Including filmmakers, producers, former Ministers of Culture and their drivers. Some pretend to be sincere, but beat about the bush, others pour ashes on their head. Only one thing is obvious - their versions differ. Truck drivers, who were carting the stolen equipment away from Koliba, make hints but are afraid to say more. Yes, she has truth at heart, this is true, but the film is to be decent and shall harm no one (...)"

Krekovič is not happy with the result, perhaps. At least he says, "If somebody has awaited an investigative report, he will be disappointed." But then he poses a remarkable question: Is the way Piussi proceeds the result of her "helplessness" or does it indicate a "method?" He quotes Piussi: ""I'm not the type disposed to 'poke', in such cases," she confessed to the magazine Film.sk." Krekovič continues, "Whether this is helplessness or method, is difficult to discern. But it is her style: rather than analyzing, she is fishing for situations where the truth opens and reveals itself. The filmmaker (...) captures something about people that says more than what they speak: gestures, evasive answers and empty phrases . (...) An example is the scene with Ivan Hudec, the former Minister of Culture. "It's beautiful," he says enthusiastically to Piussi, pointing at the little lake which the former politician has next to his villa. Beautiful it would be - if the question would not hang in the air who stole away all the equipment of Koliba at the time when the government in office included himself."

=== Piussi's analysis of the present situation ===
During the interview with Susan Uličianska, the interviewer says: "Do you really think that Oligarchy is the natural arrangement of Slovakia", as the cartoon character at the end of the film From Fico to Fico proclaims?" Piussi's immediate reaction is emphasizing the humor in her films which she conceives as a provocation, too. But later on, in the interview, she says, "Protest is important, otherwise politicians and financial groups will do with us what they want."

=== Filmography ===
- Výmet (Wipe out), 22 min. (2003)
- Bezbožná krajina (Godless country; TV film), 34 min. (2004)
- Anjeli plačú (Angels Cry), 54 min. (2005)
- Stoka (2007), 18 min. – (About the theater Stoka.)
- Stoka – Epilog (2007), 19 min.
- Babička (Grandmother), 74 min. (2008)
- Myslím, tedy slam (I think, therefore slam), 51 min. (2008)
- Koliba, 45 min. (2009) – (About the scandalous way Koliba, the Slovak national film studios, were privatized and stolen away.)
- Hrdina našich čias (A Hero of Our Time), 55 min. (2009)
- Nemoc tretej moci (Disease of the Third Power), 52 min. (2011) – (Scandals that afflict the Slovak judiciary.)
- Kuracia láska (Chicken Love), 45 min. (2011)
- Muži revolúcie (Men of the Revolution), 65 min. (2011) – (Politicians of November 1989 are remembering today the events that occurred at that time, offering conflicting versions.)
- Od Fica do Fica (From Fico to Fico), 82 min. (2012)
- Krehká identita (Fragile Identity), 70 min. (2012)
- Přímý přenos (Transference), 57 min. (2014)
- Těžká volba (Difficult Choice), 72 min. (2016)
- Český Alláh (Czech Allah), 91 min. (2017)
- Obléhání města (The Siege, co-dir. with Vít Janeček), 69 min. (doc, 2019)
- Univerzity a svoboda (University and Freedom, co-dir. with Vít Janeček), 70 min. (doc, 2019)
- Ukradnutý štát (The State Capture), 79 min (doc, 2019)
- Očista (The Ordeal), 74 min. (doc, 2021)
- Zešílet (The Unbalanced), 82 min. (fiction, 2022)
- Pachová stopa (Scent Evidence), 74 min. (2024)
- Hlas lesa (Voice of The Forest), 79 min. (2025)

=== Literature ===
- Mariana Jaremková, "Gorila a politické zoo," in: film.sk, No.11/2012, pp. 22–23. (On the film From Fico to Fico.) Also online: http://www.filmsk.sk/uploads/wnm/page/pdf_sk/91/filmsk-11-2012.pdf
- Nina Hradiská, "O nich, o nás," in: film.sk, No. 12/2012, pp. 32–33. (On the film From Fico to Fico.) Also online: http://www.filmsk.sk/uploads/wnm/page/pdf_sk/90/filmsk-12-2012.pdf
