= CSEMADOK =

Cultural society of ethnic Hungarians in Slovakia

CSEMADOK, also written Csemadok, is a cultural society of ethnic Hungarians in Slovakia. Since 2012, Gyula Bárdos serves as the chairman of the organization.

CSEMADOK was formed on 5 March 1949, in Bratislava as a part of the Czechoslovak National Front, an umbrella statewide organization. The name was abbreviation for Hungarian Csehszlovákiai Magyar Dolgozók Kultúregyesülete (see below for name changes, in Slovak: Kultúrny zväz maďarských pracujúcich v Československu, English: Czechoslovak Hungarian Workers' Cultural Association). It was one of the few ethnic based organizations in Czechoslovakia.

The organization was reported to have 43,000 members in 1953 and almost 50,000 in 1955. The society organized cultural events, lectures and supported theater-, song- and dance groups. Since 1951 it published a monthly "Fáklya" (The Torch), then, since December 1956, a weekly "A Hét" (The Week).

During the Hungarian Revolution of 1956 the leadership supported position of Czechoslovak government toward the events; this resulted in decline of members (33,000 reported in 1957).

In 1968, during the Prague Spring period, CSEMADOK supported the liberalization policies, tried to change into a political interest group and asked for more rights and privileges for the ethnic Hungarians. After the suppression of Prague Spring politics leadership of CSEMADOK was purged.

After dissolution of Czechoslovakia (end of 1992) the organisation changed its name to Szlovákiai Magyar Társadalmi és Közmüvelödési Szövetség – Csemadok (Slovak: Maďarský kultúrny a spoločenský zväz na Slovensku, English: Hungarian Social and Cultural Association of Slovakia). Toward the end of the 1990s the organisation, dependent on money from the Slovak government, almost collapsed as the government radically restricted the financial support.

As of 2021, Csemadok had 417 local chapters in southern Slovakia and around 53000 members.

== Names ==
From :

- 1949–1966: Csehszlovákiai Magyar Dolgozók Kultúregyesülete
- 1966–1969: Csehszlovákiai Magyar Dolgozók Kulturális Szövetsége
- 1969–1971: Csehszlovákiai Magyar Társadalmi és Kulturális Szövetség
- 1971–1990: Csehszlovákiai Magyar Dolgozók Kulturális Szövetsége
- 1990–1993: Csehszlovákiai Magyarok Demokratikus Szövetsége
- 1993– : Szlovákiai Magyar Társadalmi és Közművelődési Szövetség – Csemadok

== See also ==
- Polish Cultural and Educational Union - similar organization of Poles in Czechoslovakia
