= Taťjana Medvecká =

Czech actress

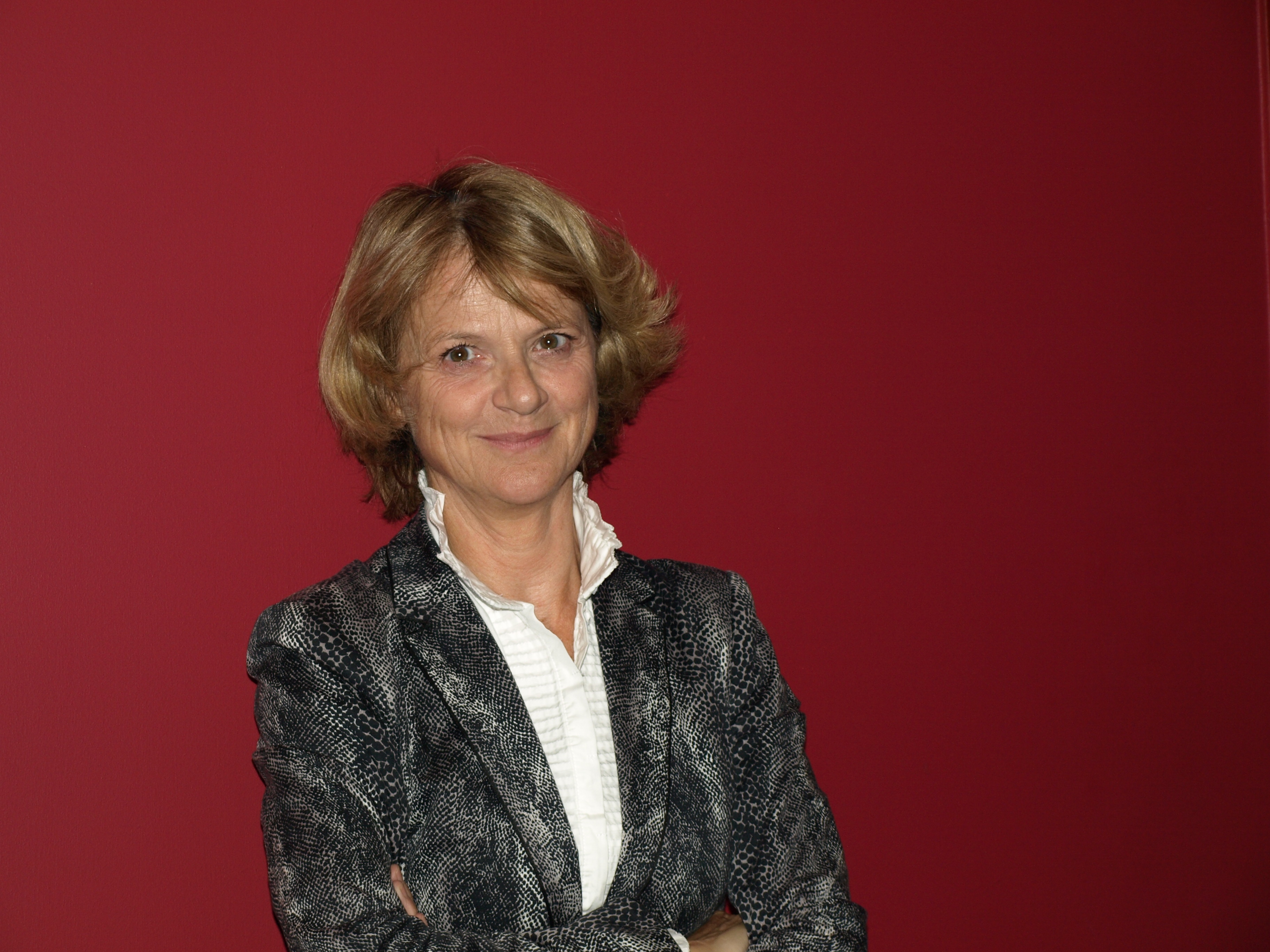
- Medvecká in 2013
- Born: 10 November 1953 (age 71); Prague, Czechoslovakia
- Occupation: Actress
- Years active: 1975-present

Taťjana Medvecká (born 10 November 1953) is a Czech actress. She starred in the film Operace Silver A under director Jiří Strach in 2007. Medvecká was named Best Supporting Actress at the 2011 Czech Lion Awards for her performance in The House. Medvecká won the equivalent award at Slovak cinema's Sun in a Net Awards a month later, for the same work.
