= Secret Delivery =

2025 Czech-Slovak-Serbian adventure family film

- Directed by: Ján Sebechlebský
- Written by: Ján Sebechlebský; Klára Formanová
- Based on: Tichá pošta by Jiří Stránský
- Produced by: Julietta Sichel; Silvia Panáková
- Starring: Judit Pecháček; Matěj Hádek; Karel Dobrý; Antonie Formanová; Daniel Fischer
- Cinematography: Martin Štrba
- Edited by: Michal Kondrla
- Music by: Vladimír Martinka
- Production companies: 8Heads Productions; Arinafilm; Living Pictures
- Distributed by: CinemArt
- Release date: 27 February 2025 (Czech Republic)
- Running time: 97 minutes
- Countries: Czech Republic; Slovakia; Serbia
- Languages: Czech; German; French

Secret Delivery (Czech: Tichá pošta) is a 2025 adventure family film directed by Ján Sebechlebský. The screenplay was written by Ján Sebechlebský and Klára Formanová. The story is based on a novel of the same name by Jiří Stránský, which is based on true events. The film premiered in Czech cinemas on 27 February 2025.

== Plot ==
The film takes place in the snowy Giant Mountains at the end of World War II. A group of child heroes rescue a downed French pilot. Their action resembles the principle of the game of silent mail – they pass the pilot between mountain villages as a secret message at school. But they play a risky game. They must face deadly soldiers of the German occupation army, outwit traitors and informers, and survive in the harsh conditions of the winter in the mountains.

== Festivals ==
- 65th Zlín International Film Festival for Children and Youths, Czech Republic, 29/5 — 4/6/2025
- 78th Locarno Film Festival, Switzerland, 6/8 — 16/8/2025, international premiere
- Buster – Copenhagen IFF for Children and Youth, Denmark, 20/9 — 3/10/2025
- 38th Finále Plzeň, Czech Republic, 26/9 – 1/10/2025, main competition
- 30th SCHLiNGEL Film Festival, Germany, 27/9 – 4/10/2025, main competition – special mention of European children jury
- MiniTIFF, Romania, 6/10 – 12/10/2025
- 57th Ota Hofman's Children's Film & TV Festival, Czech Republic, 12/10 – 17/10/2025, competition – best film (13-18 age), best boy actor (children jury) Theo Shaeffer
- 32nd Kineko IFF for Children and Youth, Japan, 31/10 — 4/11/2025, asian premiere, teenage film competition
- 38th Castellinaria Festival del cinema giovane, Switzerland, 15/11 — 22/11/2025, main competition
- 44th Oulu International Children's and Youth Film Festival, Finland, 15/11 – 23/11/2025, teenage film competition
- Czech&Slovak Film Festival WA, Australia, 15/12/2025
- 3rd Bulbul Children's International Film Festival, India, 13/1 - 17/1/2026, international competition
- 37th Trieste Film Festival, Italy, 16/1 - 24/1/2026
- 36th Tromsø International Film Festival, Norway, 19/1 - 25/1/2026
- 27th Stockholm International Film Festival Junior, Sweden, 23/3 - 29/3/2026
- 32nd International Children’s Film Festival Schwäbisch Gmünd, Germany, 31/3 - 6/4/2026, main competition
- 45th Minneapolis St. Paul International Film Festival, USA, 8/4 - 19/4/2026, Films for Families
- 14th Czech That Film Texas, USA, 28/4/2026
- 21st Busan International Kids & Youth Film Festival, South Korea, 8/7 - 14/7/2026
- 44th Ale Kino!, Poland, 22 - 29/11/2026

== Cast ==
- Matěj Hádek as Soukup
- Judit Pecháček as Soukupová
- Karel Dobrý as Erlebach
- Antonie Formanová as Teacher
- Petr Forman as Vičan
- Roman Poláčik as Gollwitz
- Daniel Fischer as Tománek
- Jean-Thierry d’Almeida as Pierre
- Denis Šafařík as Milouš
- Jacob Erftemeijer as Hans

== Production ==
The film was produced by 8Heads Productions, Arinafilm and Living Pictures. The film was produced by Czech Television, Slovak Radio and Television, Barrandov Studio and Moss & Roy, and was supported by the State Film Fund, the Slovak Audiovisual Fund and the Ministry of Culture of the Slovak Republic. The film was distributed by Cinemart.

The film was shot in Ústí nad Labem, Liberec and Plzeň regions, as well as in other locations that also include Slovakia. The 32-day shooting began at the end of January 2024 and was completed in mid-March 2024. Post-production took place in Prague and Belgrade.

The premiere in Czech cinemas took place on 27 February 2025.

The film was presented as a work in progress at the Tallinn Black Nights film festival in the Just Film children's section in November 2024.

The film had its international premiere at the Locarno Film Festival on 13 August 2025.
