= Hačava =

Municipality of Slovakia

Hačava Ájfalucska
- Municipality
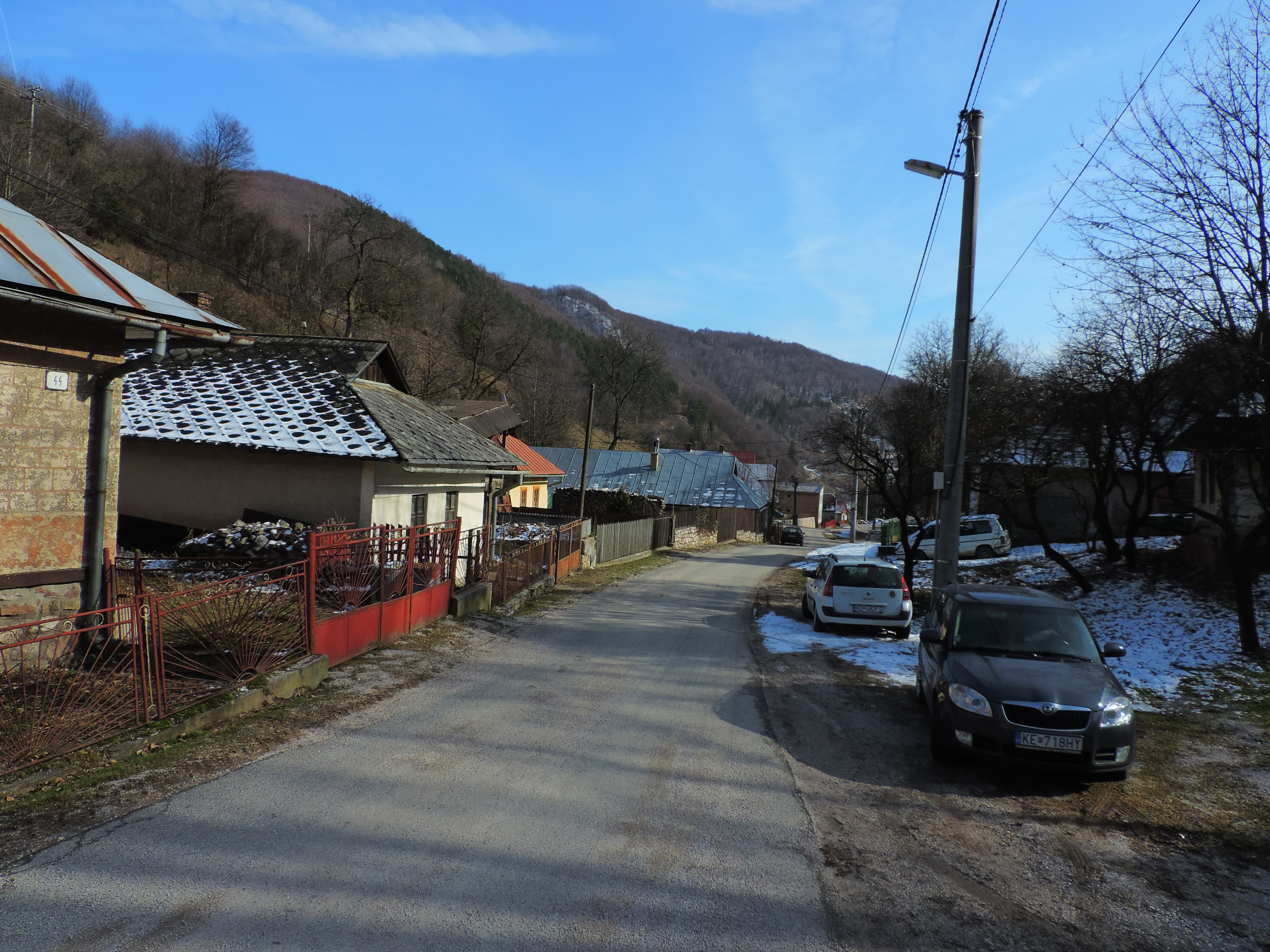

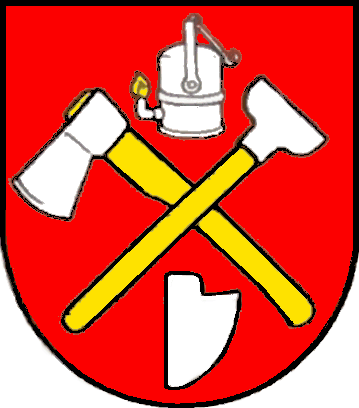
- Flag Coat of arms

- Location of Hačava in the Košice Region Location of Hačava in Slovakia
- Coordinates: 48.67°N 20.84°E
- Country: Slovakia
- Region: Košice Region
- District: Košice-okolie District
- First mentioned: 1409

Area
  - Total: 36.91 km^{2} (14.25 sq mi)
- Elevation: 630 m (2,070 ft)

Population (2025)
  - Total: 180
- Time zone: UTC+1 (CET)
  - Summer (DST): UTC+2 (CEST)
- Postal code: 440 2
- Area code: +421 55
- Vehicle registration plate (until 2022): KS
- Website: www.obechacava.sk

Hačava (German: Wagnerhau; Hungarian: Ájfalucska) is a village and municipality in Košice-okolie District in the Košice Region of eastern Slovakia.

== History ==
First mention of the village is to be found in records dating back to 1409 when it was funded by German settlers driven here by a certain Master Wagner. In the 16th century it belonged to the noble family of Széchy. During that period, it was destroyed by Turks and suffered greatly because of the Polish-Lithuanian War. The place remained almost deserted. In the 18th century some Rusyn colonists contributed to repopulate the village.

== Geography ==
The municipality lies at an altitude of 630 metres (2,070 ft) and covers an area of 36.91 km^{2} (14.25 sq mi) (2025). It lies in Hajska-dolina underneath Jeleni Vrch. There is a bike trail available that begins at the town of Moldava-nad-Bodvou, travelling through the nearby village of Haj and ends at Knizna Polona. It is surrounded by a mountainous forest area and a cave is located a few kilometres away.

== Population ==
Population statistic (10 years)
Year	1995	2005	2015	2025
Count	201	224	230	180
Difference		+11.44%	+2.67%	−21.73%

Population statistic
Year	2024	2025
Count	184	180
Difference		−2.17%

It has a population of 180 people (31 December 2025).

=== Ethnicity ===
Census 2021 (1+ %)
Ethnicity	Number	Fraction
Slovak	177	87.19%
Rusyn	51	25.12%
Romani	6	2.95%
Not found out	3	1.47%
Total	203	

In year 2021 was 203 people by ethnicity 177 as Slovak, 51 as Rusyn, 6 as Romani, 3 as Not found out, 1 as Czech, 1 as Russian and 1 as French.

Note on population: The difference values of population numbers in the table "Population statistic" and in the sections "Ethnicity" & "Religion" is caused by the use of various statistical methods.

=== Religion ===
Census 2021 (1+ %)
Religion	Number	Fraction
Greek Catholic Church	134	66.01%
None	49	24.14%
Roman Catholic Church	15	7.39%
Not found out	3	1.48%
Total	203	

In year 2021 was 203 people by religion 134 from Greek Catholic Church, 49 from None, 15 from Roman Catholic Church, 3 from Not found out, 1 from Christian Congregations in Slovakia and 1 from Other.

== Genealogical resources ==
Records for genealogical research are available at the state archive "Statny Archiv in Kosice, Slovakia"

- Greek Catholic church records (births/marriages/deaths): 1810-1926 (parish A)

== See also ==
- List of municipalities and towns in Slovakia
