= Slávka Halčáková =

Slovak actress (born 1974)

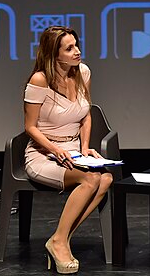
- Halčáková in 2017
- Born: 20 December 1974 (age 51); Dunajská Streda, Czechoslovakia
- Education: Academy of Performing Arts in Bratislava
- Occupation: Actress
- Spouse: Dano Heriban (m. 2005; div. 2007)
- Children: 1

Slávka Halčáková (born 20 December 1974) is a Slovak actress.

== Biography ==
Slávka Halčáková was born on 20 December 1974 in Dunajská Streda. As a child, she competed in reciting poetry. She studied acting at the Academy of Performing Arts in Bratislava. After graduation, she performed at the Slovak National Theatre and other theatres in Bratislava.

She wrote, directed and acted in her own play, called The essence of a wild woman at the L+S Theatre.

As a movie actress, she premiered in the movie Blue Heaven (1997), directed by Eva Borušovičová. She also starred in Borušovičová's next movie Love me if you Dare (2001), Polčas rozpadu (2007) directed by Vlado Fischer and Juraj Nvota's Hostage (2014). She also appeared in soap operas Ordinácia v Ružovej Záhrade (2007) and Panelák (2008).

In addition to acting, Halčáková was the original host of the first Slovak hit parade Deka.

== Personal life ==
From 2005 to 2007, Halčáková was married to the actor Dano Heriban. In 2012, Halčáková gave birth to a daughter with her partner Miloslav Jež.
