= Out (2017 film) =

2017 film

- Film poster
- Slovak: Out
- Directed by: György Kristóf
- Written by: György Kristóf; Gábor Papp; Eszter Horváth
- Starring: Judit Bárdos
- Distributed by: Cercamon
- Release date: 22 May 2017 (Cannes)
- Running time: 83 minutes
- Country: Slovakia
- Languages: Slovak; Hungarian; Russian; Latvian

Out is a 2017 Slovak drama film directed by György Kristóf. It was screened in the Un Certain Regard section at the 2017 Cannes Film Festival.

== Cast ==
- Judit Bárdos as Daughter
- Attila Bocsárszky as Pišta
- Éva Bandor as Wife
- Guna Zariņa as Gaida
- Ieva Norvele as Activist
