= The House (2011 film) =

- Slovak: Dom
- Directed by: Zuzana Liová
- Starring: Miroslav Krobot; Taťjana Medvecká; Judit Bárdos
- Cinematography: Juraj Chlpík
- Music by: Walter Kraft
- Release date: 29 September 2011
- Running time: 100 minutes
- Country: Slovakia
- Languages: Slovak

The House (Slovak: Dom) is a 2011 drama film written and directed by Zuzana Liová and starring Miroslav Krobot, Taťjana Medvecká and Judit Bárdos. The film won the main prize at the 2012 Finále Plzeň Film Festival. At the 2012 ceremony for the Sun in a Net Awards, the film won in the categories of Best Film and Best Actress, for the performance of Judit Bárdos. Taťjana Medvecká's performance in the film won her the accolade of Best Supporting Actress at the Czech Lion Awards as well as the Sun in a Net Awards.

== Cast ==
- Miroslav Krobot as Imrich
- Taťjana Medvecká as Viera
- Judit Bárdos as Eva
- Ester Geislerová as Hana
- Marek Geišberg as Milan
- Lucia Jašková as Jana
- Marián Mitaš as Jakub
- Attila Mokos
- Ivan Romančík

== See also ==
- List of Czech films of the 2010s
