= Pavol Barabáš =

Slovak film director

Pavol Barabáš (born September 13, 1959, in Trenčín) is a Slovak film director.

== Career ==
He has produced a variety of documentaries about poorly accessible places where human beings hardly ever set foot before. His work deals also with unusual cultures, humans living under extreme conditions, or travelers making unique achievements in the sense of reaching unusual destinations.

Barabáš is particularly interested in Tibetan Buddhism but also people living deeply in the jungle, untouched by modern civilization and with little or no influence by Western societies.

Barabáš is the vice president of the Slovak Film Academy. He has won over 150 film awards in his home country and abroad, including the Grand Prix award at the Fifth International Mountain Film Festival.
