= Karel Plicka =

Czechoslovak photographer, director, cinematographer, folklorist and pedagogue

Karel Plicka

Karel Plicka (Slovak: Karol Plicka; 14 October 1894 – 6 May 1987) was a Czechoslovak photographer, film director, cinematographer, folklorist and pedagogue. He is considered a founder of Slovak film education and filmmaking. He helped establish the genre of ethnographic film in Czechoslovakia.

== Early life ==
Plicka was born to Czech parents in Vienna. He spent his childhood in Vienna and in Česká Třebová for four years between 1900 and 1909. Following his graduation at the Teachers Institute in Hradec Králové (1909–1913), Plicka studied violin and music theory privately in Prague and Berlin. His early interest in music resulted in founding various choirs in Úpice and Nové Město nad Metují, and most importantly he co-founded the choir of the Czech Philharmonic, together with conductor Václav Talich and composer Jaroslav Křička. He was the artistic director of the choir from 1920 to 1924. During World War I, he was engaged as a singer in the Court Opera in Vienna. Additionally, Plicka focused his interest on collecting Slovak folk songs. From 1919 to 1938, he managed to collect 64,000 melodies and about 100,000 texts of folk songs. His ethnographic works made during that period include over 22,000 photographs and 30 km of film material. During his travels, Plicka also visited exiled Slovaks in Romania, Austria, Yugoslavia, and the United States. His stays were arranged by Matica slovenská in Martin.

== Career ==
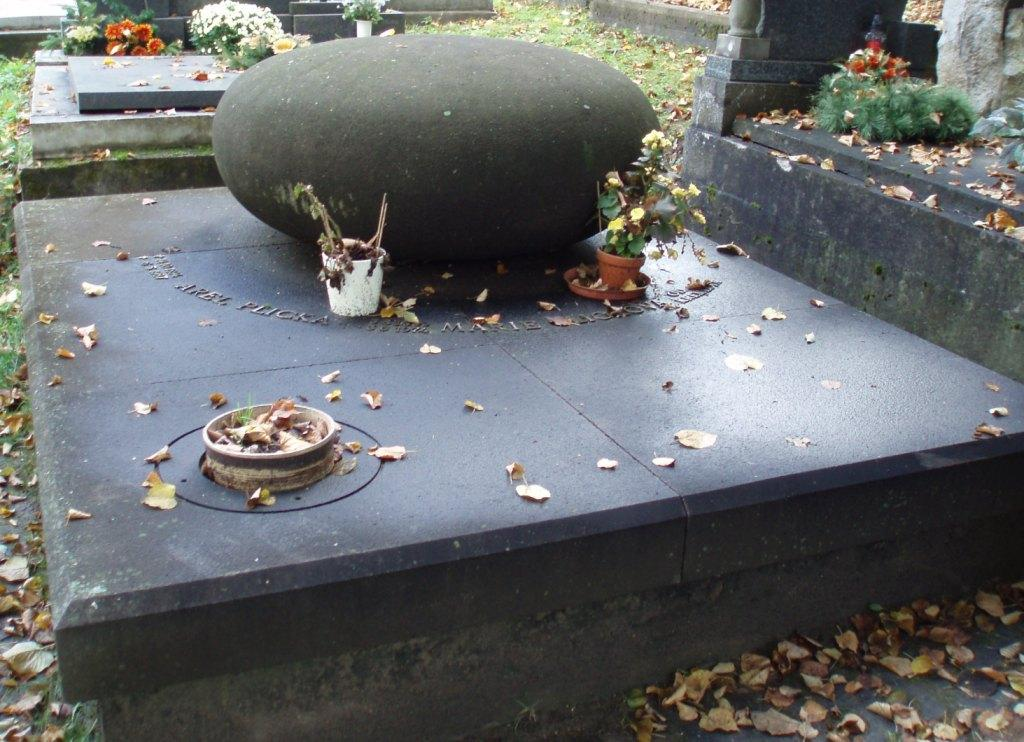
Plicka's grave in Martin, Slovakia

In the late 1920s, Plicka began using a camera on his travels and contributed photographs to the Prague illustrated weekly Pestrý týden. He created his first silm films in 1928 (Za Slovenským ludom) and 1929 (Po horách, po dolách). The latter received a Gold Medal at the 1st Venice International Film Festival, held in 1932. In 1932, he met and befriended the photographer and filmmaker Alexandr Hackenschmied, with whom he co-created the "film poem" Zem spieva (The Earth Sings), considered a magnum opus of Czechoslovak documentary film. In the 1930s and 40s, he collaborated as an expert assistant in production of Slovak and Soviet films (e.g. Jánošík (1935) by Martin Frič and films by Ilya Kopalin and Vasily Belyayev). In 1938, he founded the courses of photography and cinematography at the Škola umeleckých remesiel (School of Applied Arts) in Bratislava. It was the first attempt at film education in Czechoslovakia. Later, in 1946, he co-founded the Film and TV School of the Academy of Performing Arts in Prague (FAMU), of which he became the first dean.

However, Plicka left FAMU in 1950 due to health issues, and devoted himself mainly to landscape and architectural photography. His photographic and ethnographic work was published in many books and was highly regarded both by public and experts. In his books, Plicka concentrated on documenting folk traditions, Slovak landscape, and Prague. During his life, Plicka received the highest state awards, such as Řád práce (Order of Work) (1954), National Artist (1968), Prize for the Best Book of the Year (1971), National Prize of the Slovak Socialist Republic (1975) and Order of Tomáš Garrigue Masaryk (in memoriam, 1991).

Karel Plicka died in 1987 in Prague. He was buried in the Slovak town of Martin. Since 1988, there has been a museum dedicated to his work in the Slovak municipality of Blatnica.

== Books of work by Plicka ==
These lists are not complete.

=== Photography ===
- Slovensko / Slovakei / Slovaquie / Slovakia. Martin: Vydala Matica Slovenská, 1938. (in Slovak, German, French, and English)
- City of baroque and gothic: 208 photographs. London: Lincolns-Prager, 1946. Views of Prague.
- Prague en images / Prague in photographs. Prague: Orbis, 1950. (in Czech, Russian, French, and English)
- Prague in photographs / Prague en images / Praga w Obrazach. Prague: Artia, 1954. (in English, French, and Polish)
- Die Slowakei Prag - Tschechoslowakei, 1953. (in Czech, German, French, English, and Russian)
- Praga regia: Das königliche Prag. Royal Prague. Prague royale. Prague: Orbis, 1955. (in Czech, German, English, and French)
- Prague in photographs. Prague: Artia, 1961. (in English, French, and Russian)
- Prague: The golden city. London: Hamlyn, 1965. (in German, French, English, and Spanish)
- žijeme v Praze. Prague: Orbis, 1964 (in Czech, Russian, German, English, French, and Spanish)
- VLTAVA. Prague: Orbis, 1967. (in Czech)
- 7 procházek Prahou: fotografický pru̇vodce městem. Prague: Orbis, 1966. (in Czech)
- Levoča: klenotnica umeleckých pamiatok. Martin: Vydavatel̕stvo Osveta, 1980. (in Slovak)
- Československo. Prague: Orbis, 1974. (in Czech)

=== Other ===
- Eva Studeničová spieva: z piesňovej zbierky Karola Plicku. Martin: Vydateľstvo Osveta, 1984. (in Slovak) A collection of folk songs.

== Filmography ==
- Za slovenským ľudom (1928)
- Po horách, po dolách (1929)
- Jaro na Podkarpatské Rusi (1929)
- Zem spieva (1933)
- Prezident republiky Dr. Beneš u nás (1935)
- Za Slovákmi od New Yorku po Mississippi (1936)
- Věčná píseň (1941)
- Praha barokní
- Chebsko (1943)
- Pán prezident na Slovensku (1945)
- Roľnícky deň vo Zvolene (1946)
