= Dano Heriban =

Slovak actor (1980–2023)

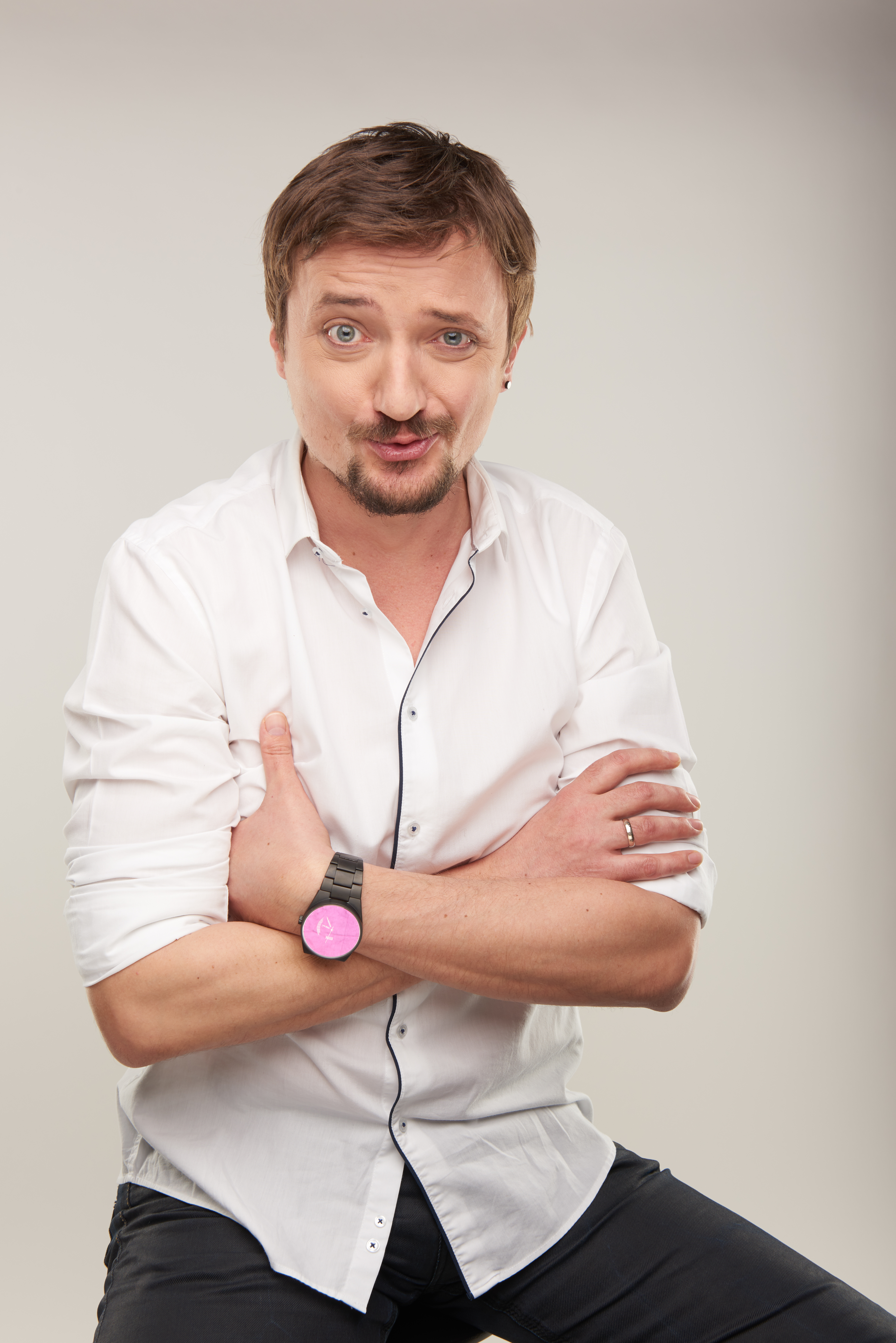
- Born: 25 March 1980; Trnava, Czechoslovakia
- Died: 24 May 2023 (aged 43); Svätý Jur, Slovakia
- Occupation(s): Stage, film and television actor
- Spouse: Slávka Halčáková (m. 2005; div. 2007) Kamila Heribanová (m. 2016)
- Children: 3

Daniel Heriban (25 March 1980 – 24 May 2023) was a Slovak actor and musician who was known as one of the most universal actors in Slovakia, capable of excelling both in comedic and tragic roles.

== Biography ==
Heriban was born in Trnava on 25 March 1980. Following his graduation from the Academy of Performing Arts in Bratislava in 2004, he started acting at the Theatre in Martin. In 2014, he switched to the Slovak National Theatre. He also starred in the long-running television series Horná Dolná, Druhá Šanca, Pumpa as well as in the movies Únos and Sviňa. His last movie The Man Who Stood in the Way, where Heriban plays the main character of Alexander Dubček, was released on 25 May, one day after his death. For his theatre and television work, he received two DOSKY Awards (2012, 2013) and one OTO (2015).

== Personal life and death ==
From 2005 Heriban was married to the actress Slávka Halčáková. They divorced in 2007. In 2016 he married the actress Kamila Heribanová. They had two sons. In addition, Heriban had another son from a previous relationship.

Heriban died from a heart attack in Svätý Jur, on 24 May 2023, at the age of 43. Many fellow actors, as well as the President Zuzana Čaputová, paid homage to Heriban after his death.
