= Mariana Čengel Solčanská =

Slovak film director (born 1978)

- Born: 14 February 1978 (age 47); Nitra, Czechoslovakia
- Occupation(s): Director, screenwriter, writer
- Years active: 2010–present

Mariana Čengel Solčanská (born 14 February 1978) is a Slovak film director, screenwriter and writer.

== Early life and education ==
Martina Solčanská was born on 14 February 1978 in Nitra. She studied political science and cultural studies at the Constantine the Philosopher University in Nitra as well as film directing at the Academy of Performing Arts in Bratislava under the supervision of Stanislav Párnický and Martin Šulík. In 2014 she obtained a doctorate in media studies from the Pan-European University.

== Directing career ==
Following a string of short student movies, Solčanská full-length debut was the historical adventure movie The Legend of Flying Cyprian released in 2010, followed by TV film Autopsy. In addition to directing, she authored the script of both movies. In 2013, she directed the social drama Love Me or Leave Me based on the script by Alena Bodingerová. In 2014, she directed and wrote the fairy tale Láska na Vlásku , which became a hit in Slovak cinemas in spite of lukewarm reviews.

In the second half of the 2010s, Solčanská directed several movies critical of political developments in Slovakia. She saw the turn towards more overt political messaging as her "civic duty" due to the political developments in the county. In 2017 she directed and wrote the movie Kidnapping, depicting the crimes committed by the Slovak secret service under the authoritative government of Vladimír Mečiar in the 1990. In 2020 she followed up by the thriller Scumbag based on the novel by journalist Arpád Soltész. Both Kidnapping and Scumbag were among the most successful movies in Slovak cinemas since the independence of the country.

In 2022, she wrote and directed the fairy tale The Enchanted Cave and directed the historical social drama The Chambermaid, based on the script by Hana Lasicová. The Chambermaid became the first Slovak movie focusing on portraying a homosexual relationship. In 2023, Solčanská directed the fairytale Three Golden Ducats, which was originally supposed to be directed by her suddenly deceased mentor Párnický.

== Writing career ==
Solčanská is known for writing scripts for a majority of her movies herself. In 2018 she published a historical novel Generál inspired by the life of Milan Rastislav Štefánik. In 2019, she published another novel inspired by the life of the outlaw Juraj Jánošík. Since 2021, she has been a regular columnist for the daily Sme.
