= List of OTO Award winners and nominees =

Slovakia TV Awards

Osobnosť televíznej obrazovky (Television Screen Personality), more commonly abbreviated as OTO, was an annual Slovak television awards show which recognized public figures and works of popular culture in the country. Established by the Art Production Agency (APA) in 2000, the poll-based awards were voted on by the viewing audiences. The awards ceremonies were screened live by the national television network RTVS, usually in March for the previous calendar year.

The categories awarded regularly included Program, Actor, Actress, Male and Female Singer, as well two special awards; Hall of Fame and Absolute OTO.

In 2022, it was announced that the awards would be discontinued. This followed controversies in previous years, delays due to the COVID-19 pandemic, declining popularity and high production costs.

OTO Awards
Winners and nominees

Most wins
Adela Vinczeová | 10x (2017)
Marcel Merčiak | 9x (2017)
Miroslav Žbirka | 7x (2013)
Patrik Herman | 7x (2017)

Most nominations
Miroslav Žbirka | 16x (2016)
Lenka Čviriková | 15x (2017)
Patrik Herman | 14x (2017)
Marcel Merčiak | 14x (2017)

Special awards not included

== Most wins ==
- With 10 awards for TV Host and TV Host – Entertainment, Adela Vinczeová was the most successful participant in the awards' history. Including special achievements, she had 15 wins in total.
- Marcel Merčiak accumulated 9 awards as Sports Commentator, and 12 when including special achievements. He was also the only winner to win in two categories per year, both the special (2012) and regular (2015 – 2017).
- Miroslav Žbirka and Patrik Herman each scored seven wins, as Male Singer and TV Journalist respectively. Herman also holds the record for the highest number of consecutive wins per category.
- The participant with the third highest number of OTO awards overall (including special awards), is Actress Zdena Studenková with eight wins.
- Žbirka was the most nominated individual, with 16 nominations in a row since the awards' second season. Sportscaster Lenka Čviriková received 15 nominations, and Herman and Merčiak received 14.
- Other frequent winner-nominees include Jarmila Lajčáková and Petra Polnišová, who both scored in at least three individual categories. Lajčáková was recognised as Sports Host (2000), Sports Commentator (2001) and News Host (2008). Polnišová was a single winner as Humorist (2007) and a triple winner as Actress; mainly for Comedy.

Janko Kroner for a change, has been the only artist nominated overall in four categories through the years, once as Children's Program Host. Eventually winning twice for performing arts, eleven nominations in total make him the most nominated actor ever, being followed by fellow multiple winners or nominees such as Maroš Kramár, Emília Vášáryová and Polnišová; these with eight nominations each. Based solely on the most nominations with no competitive win, the most notable is Sports Commentator and eleven-time nominee Ján Plesník.

The youngest holder of the award is Marcel Chlpík that won now discontinued category New Actor as seven years old, the oldest actress Magda Paveleková which earned a trophy at the age of eighty-one; upon her induction into the Hall of Fame. In terms of other OTO honorees, Dušan Gabáni and Marika Gombitová are the only non-acting recipients of such award, with Gabáni becoming the first sports commentator ever or presenter as such, and Gombitová as the only music artist in general or else the youngest honoree at fifty-eight. Jozef Kroner, Július Satinský and Leona Kočkovičová have accomplished their awards in memoriam; first as a honoree, the others as regular nominees.

== Winners per categories ==
=== TV hosts and other presenters ===
HOSTS AND PRESENTERS
	News Host	Journalist	Sports Host	Commentator	Entertainer	Announcer
	News and Journalism		Sports Host or Commentator		Host	Children's Host
2000	Aneta Parišková	Eva Černá	Jarmila Lajčáková		Jozef Pročko (3×CW)	Soňa Müllerová (3×CW)
2001	Daniel Krajcer (2×CW)		Jozef Nodžák (2×CW)	Jarmila Lajčáková	Jozef Pročko (3×CW)	Soňa Müllerová (3×CW)
2002	Daniel Krajcer (2×CW)		Jozef Nodžák (2×CW)	Miroslav Michalech	Jozef Pročko (3×CW)	Soňa Müllerová (3×CW)
2003	Jana Majeská		Lenka Čviriková			
2003	Jana Majeská		Lenka Čviriková		Peter Marcin	Jozef Nodžák (2×CW)
2004	Aneta Parišková (2×CW)	Daniel Krajcer	Martina Šimkovičová (2×CW)		Viliam Rozboril	Jozef Nodžák (2×CW)
2005	Aneta Parišková (2×CW)	Zlatica Švajdová (5×CW)	Martina Šimkovičová (2×CW)		Adela Banášová (6×CW)	
2006	Martina Šimkovičová	Zlatica Švajdová (5×CW)	Lenka Čviriková (4×CW)		Adela Banášová (6×CW)	Peter Marcin
2007	Rastislav Žitný	Zlatica Švajdová (5×CW)	Lenka Čviriková (4×CW)		Adela Banášová (6×CW)	Petra Polnišová
2008	Jarmila Lajčáková	Zlatica Švajdová (5×CW)	Lenka Čviriková (4×CW)		Adela Banášová (6×CW)	Humorist
2009	Lucia Barmošová (5×CW)	Zlatica Švajdová (5×CW)	Lenka Čviriková (4×CW)		Adela Banášová (6×CW)	
2010	Lucia Barmošová (5×CW)	Patrik Herman (7×CW)	Peter Varinský (2×CW)		Adela Banášová (6×CW)	
2011	Lucia Barmošová (5×CW)	Patrik Herman (7×CW)	Peter Varinský (2×CW)		Martin Rausch	News Reporter
2012	Lucia Barmošová (5×CW)	Patrik Herman (7×CW)	Lenka Čviriková	Marcel Merčiak (6×CW)	Andrej Bičan (2×CW)	Jozef Kubáni (2×CW)
2013	Lucia Barmošová (5×CW)	Patrik Herman (7×CW)	Peter Varinský (2×CW)	Marcel Merčiak (6×CW)	Andrej Bičan (2×CW)	Jozef Kubáni (2×CW)
2014	Ján Mečiar	Patrik Herman (7×CW)	Peter Varinský (2×CW)	Marcel Merčiak (6×CW)	Adela Banášová (4×CW)	Danica Kleinová
2015	Adriana Kmotríková (2×CW)	Patrik Herman (7×CW)	Marcel Merčiak (3×CW)	Marcel Merčiak (6×CW)	Adela Banášová (4×CW)	Jozef Kubáni
2016	Adriana Kmotríková (2×CW)	Patrik Herman (7×CW)	Marcel Merčiak (3×CW)	Marcel Merčiak (6×CW)	Adela Banášová (4×CW)	Leona Kočkovičová
2017	Ľubomír Bajaník	Kristína Kövešová	Marcel Merčiak (3×CW)	Marcel Merčiak (6×CW)	Adela Banášová (4×CW)	Jozef Kubáni
"CW" = continuously running wins per category

=== TV actors and other performers ===
ACTORS					MUSICIANS		
	Actor	New Actor		Actress	Male Singer	Band	Female Singer
	Drama	Comedy	Drama	Comedy	Male Singer	Band	Female Singer
2000	Michal Dočolomanský (2×CW)		Zdena Studenková (6×CW)		Jozef Ráž	Jozef Ráž	Jana Kirschner
2001	Michal Dočolomanský (2×CW)		Zdena Studenková (6×CW)		Miroslav Žbirka (5×CW)		Marika Gombitová
2002	Július Satinský	Július Satinský	Zdena Studenková (6×CW)		Miroslav Žbirka (5×CW)		Misha (2×CW)
2003	Michal Dočolomanský	Michal Dočolomanský	Zdena Studenková (6×CW)		Miroslav Žbirka (5×CW)		Misha (2×CW)
2004	Maroš Kramár (2×CW)		Zdena Studenková (6×CW)		Miroslav Žbirka (5×CW)		Zuzana Smatanová (2×CW)
2005	Maroš Kramár (2×CW)		Zdena Studenková (6×CW)		Miroslav Žbirka (5×CW)		Zuzana Smatanová (2×CW)
2006	Janko Kroner	Janko Kroner	Zuzana Fialová (2×CW)		Mário Kollár (5×CW)		Katarína Knechtová (2×CW)
2007	Tomáš Maštalír (2×CW)		Zuzana Fialová (2×CW)		Mário Kollár (5×CW)		Katarína Knechtová (2×CW)
2008	Tomáš Maštalír (2×CW)		Diana Mórová	Diana Mórová	Mário Kollár (5×CW)		Jana Kirschner (3×CW)
2009	Janko Kroner	Janko Kroner	Petra Polnišová	Petra Polnišová	Mário Kollár (5×CW)		Jana Kirschner (3×CW)
2010	Ján Koleník (2×CW)	Lukáš Latinák (2×CW)	Emília Vášáryová	Petra Polnišová (2×CW)	Mário Kollár (5×CW)		Jana Kirschner (3×CW)
2011	Ján Koleník (2×CW)	Lukáš Latinák (2×CW)	Diana Mórová	Petra Polnišová (2×CW)	Marián Čekovský	Marián Čekovský	Nela Pocisková
2012	Ján Koleník	Ján Jackuliak	Ján Jackuliak	Monika Hilmerová	Miroslav Žbirka	Miroslav Žbirka	Celeste Buckingham
2013	Lukáš Latinák	Marcel Chlpík	Marcel Chlpík	Helena Krajčiová	(2×CW)	Fragile (3×CW)	(3×CW)
2014	Juraj Kemka	Juraj Kemka	Zuzana Šebová (2×CW)		Adam Ďurica (3×CW)	Fragile (3×CW)	(3×CW)
2015	Daniel Heriban	Daniel Heriban	Zuzana Šebová (2×CW)		Adam Ďurica (3×CW)	Fragile (3×CW)	Kristína (2×CW)
2016	Michal Hudák (2×CW)		Tatiana Pauhofová	Tatiana Pauhofová	Adam Ďurica (3×CW)	IMT Smile (2×CW)	Kristína (2×CW)
2017	Michal Hudák (2×CW)		Lujza Garajová Schrameková	Lujza Garajová Schrameková	Ondrej Kandráč	IMT Smile (2×CW)	Mária Čírová
"CW" = continuously running wins per category

=== TV programming and special categories ===
PROGRAMMING					SPECIAL^{1}		
	Program	Show	Series		Overall winner		Hall of Fame
	Program	Show	Drama	Comedy^{2}	EuroTelevízia	Život ^{3}	Plus 7 dní
2000	Dereš				Jarmila Lajčáková (2×CW)		Jozef Kroner
2001	Milionár				Jarmila Lajčáková (2×CW)		Katarína Kolníková
2002	Je to možné!?				Soňa Müllerová		Ladislav Chudík
2003	Uragán			IQ Test národa	Zdena Studenková (2×CW)		Eva Krížiková
2004	SK hľadá SuperStar (2×CW)			Dievča za milión	Zdena Studenková (2×CW)		Milan Lasica
2005	SK hľadá SuperStar (2×CW)	S.O.S.		V politike	Maroš Kramár		Pavol Mikulík
2006	Susedia (2×CW)	Susedia (2×CW)		Naj. krimin. prípady	Peter Marcin		Mária Kráľovičová
2007	Susedia (2×CW)	Susedia (2×CW)		MafStory	Petra Polnišová		Karol Machata
2008	Slovensko má talent	Modré z neba (2×CW)	Ordinácia v ružovej	Mesto tieňov	Mário Kollár		Emília Vášáryová
2009	ČS SuperStar	Modré z neba (2×CW)	záhrade (2×CW)	Martin Mózer	Adela Banášová		Štefan Kvietik
2010	ČS má talent	Partička (3×CW)	Profesionáli	Téma dňa (P. Bielik)	Lukáš Latinák		Stanislav Dančiak
2011	Srdce pre deti (3×CW)	Partička (3×CW)	Panelák (2×CW)	Jozef Kubáni	Petra Polnišová		Dušan Gabáni
2012	Srdce pre deti (3×CW)	Partička (3×CW)	Panelák (2×CW)	Marcel Merčiak	Marcel Merčiak (2×CW)		Magda Paveleková
2013	Srdce pre deti (3×CW)	Milujem Slovensko (4×CW)	Búrlivé víno (2×CW)	Pavol Barabáš	Marcel Merčiak (2×CW)		Juraj Kukura
2014	V siedmom nebi	Milujem Slovensko (4×CW)	Búrlivé víno (2×CW)	Pavel Dvořák	Adela Banášová (4×CW)		Marika Gombitová
2015	Chart Show	Milujem Slovensko (4×CW)	Horná Dolná (2×CW)	Michal Kubovčík	Adela Banášová (4×CW)		Emil Horváth
2016	Tvoja tvár znie povedome	Milujem Slovensko (4×CW)	Horná Dolná (2×CW)	Peter Núñez	Adela Banášová (4×CW)		Božidara Turzonovová
2017	Extrémne premeny	Zem spieva	Naši	Inkognito	Adela Banášová (4×CW)		Milan Kňažko
"CW" = continuously running wins per category
Notes: 1 The KRAS Award for TV Program Branding was given only for the year of 2008, and in favor of the Vilomeniny show.; 2 Genre's awards within the Series category were held only at the 10th edition of the show with Profesionáli winning as the Comedy in 2009.; 3 Alongside the 2007 Život Award-winner, Téma dňa was awarded for a special achievement within the annual category.

== Superlatives ==
=== Winners ===
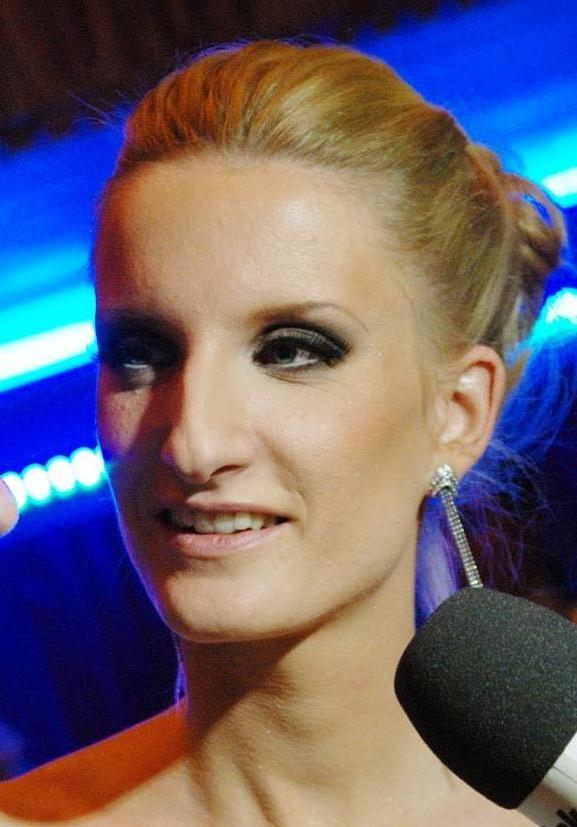
Adela Vinczeová

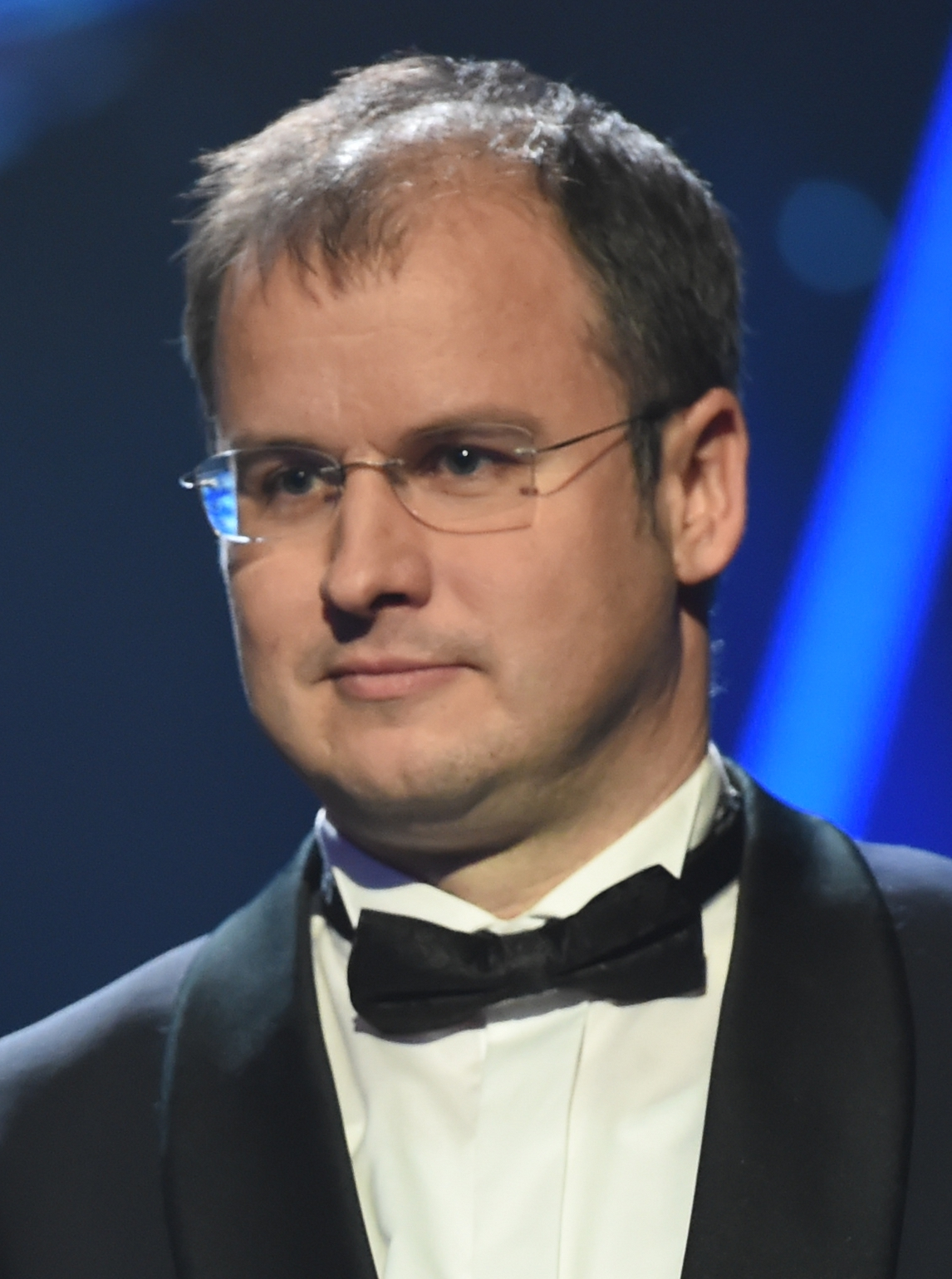
Marcel Merčiak

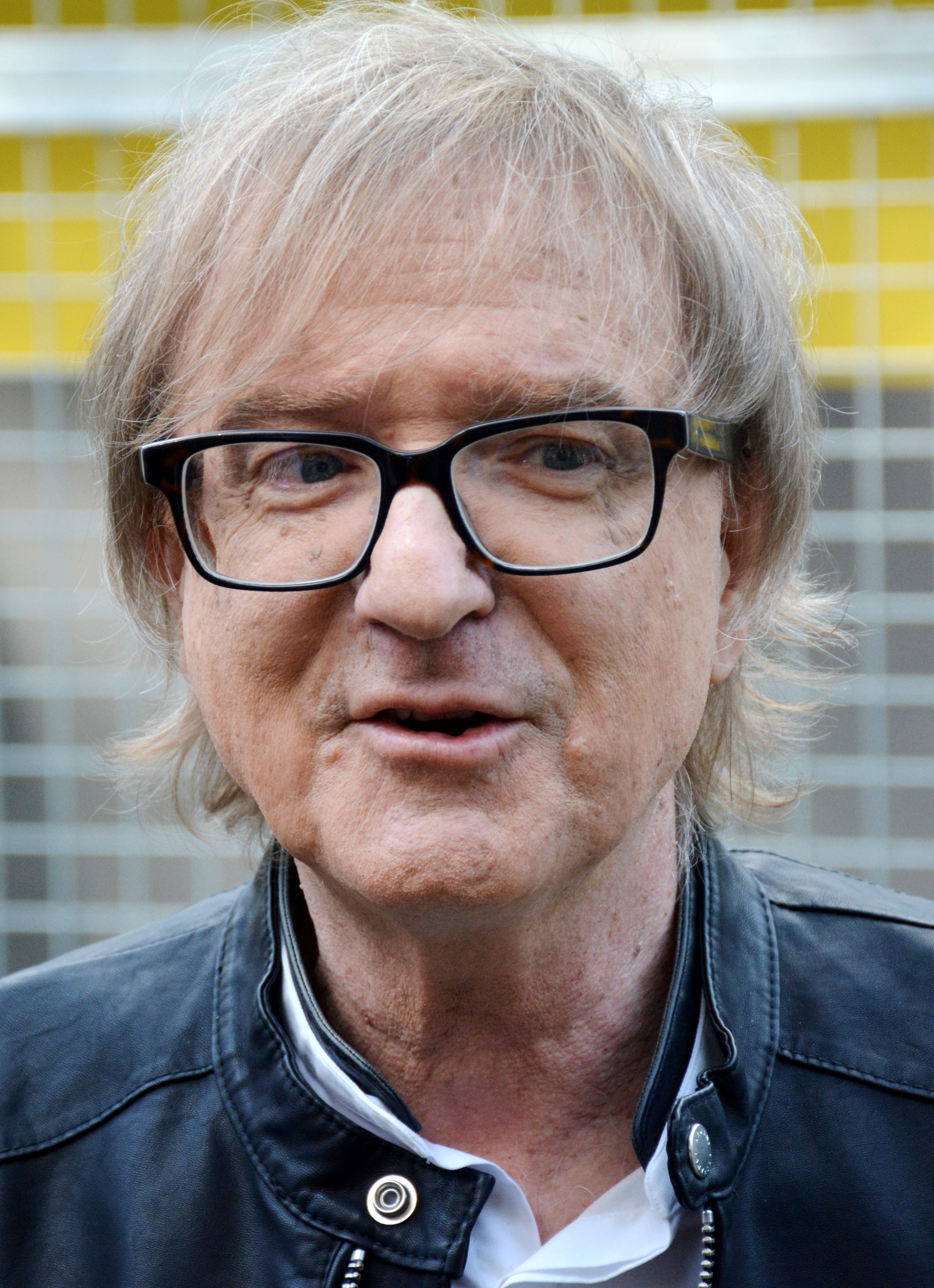
Miroslav Žbirka

10 awards

- Adela Vinczeová (née Banášová)^{Ю‡}

9 awards

- Marcel Merčiak^{Ю‡Ž}

7 awards

- Miroslav Žbirka
- Patrik Herman

6 awards

- Zdena Studenková^{Ю}
- Lenka Čviriková (née Hriadelová)^{‡}

5 awards

- Zlatica Švajdová (née Puškárová)
- Mário Kollár^{Ю}
- Lucia Barmošová

4 awards

- Jozef Nodžák
- Jana Kirschner
- Petra Polnišová^{ЮΨ}
- Peter Varinský^{‡}
- Jozef Kubáni^{Ž}

3 awards

- Soňa Müllerová^{Ю}
- Jozef Pročko
- Michal Dočolomanský
- Daniel Krajcer^{‡}
- Aneta Parišková
- Martina Šimkovičová (née Bartošíková)^{‡}
- Jarmila Lajčáková (née Hargašová)^{ЮΨ}
- Ján Koleník^{‡}
- Lukáš Latinák^{Ю‡}
- Celeste Buckingham
- Fragile
- Adam Ďurica
- Tomáš Maštalír

2 awards

- Misha
- Maroš Kramár^{Ю}
- Zuzana Smatanová
- Peter Marcin^{Ю‡}
- Zuzana Fialová
- Katarína Knechtová
- Janko Kroner
- Diana Mórová^{‡}
- Andrej Bičan
- Zuzana Šebová
- Adriana Kmotríková
- Kristína
- Michal Hudák
- IMT Smile

1 award

- Eva Černá
- Jozef Ráž
- Marika Gombitová^{┼}
- Miroslav Michalech
- Július Satinský^{†}
- Jana Majeská
- Viliam Rozboril
- Rastislav Žitný
- Emília Vášáryová^{┼}
- Martin Rausch
- Marián Čekovský
- Nela Pocisková
- Monika Hilmerová
- Ján Jackuliak
- Helena Krajčiová
- Marcel Chlpík
- Ján Mečiar
- Danica Kleinová
- Juraj Kemka
- Daniel Heriban
- Tatiana Pauhofová
- Leona Kočkovičová (née Fučíková)^{†}
- Ľubomír Bajaník
- Kristína Kövešová
- Lujza Garajová Schrameková
- Ondrej Kandráč
- Mária Čírová

Notes
^{┼} denotes an OTO honoree
^{Ю} denotes an overall winner of a ceremony
^{‡} denotes a winner in two main categories
^{Ψ} denotes a winner in three main categories
^{Ž} denotes also a winner of the Život Award
^{†} denotes an in memoriam-winner

=== Nominees ===
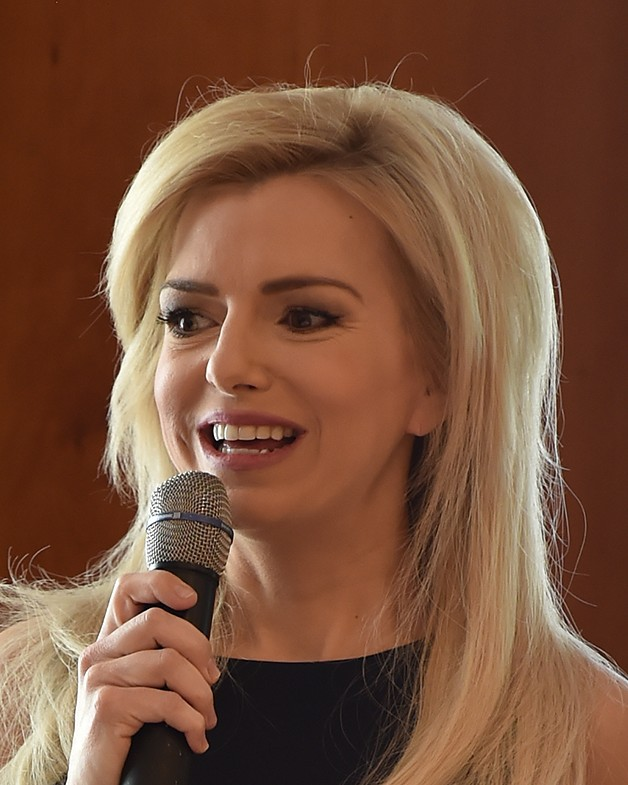
Zlatica Švajdová

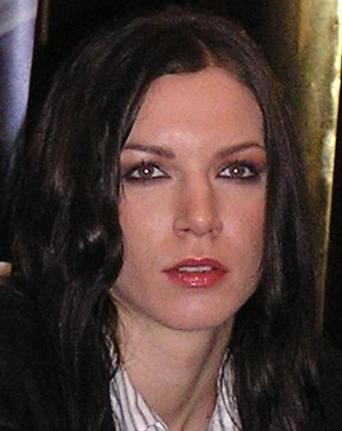
Zuza Smatanová

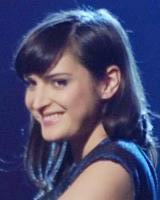
Jana Kirschner

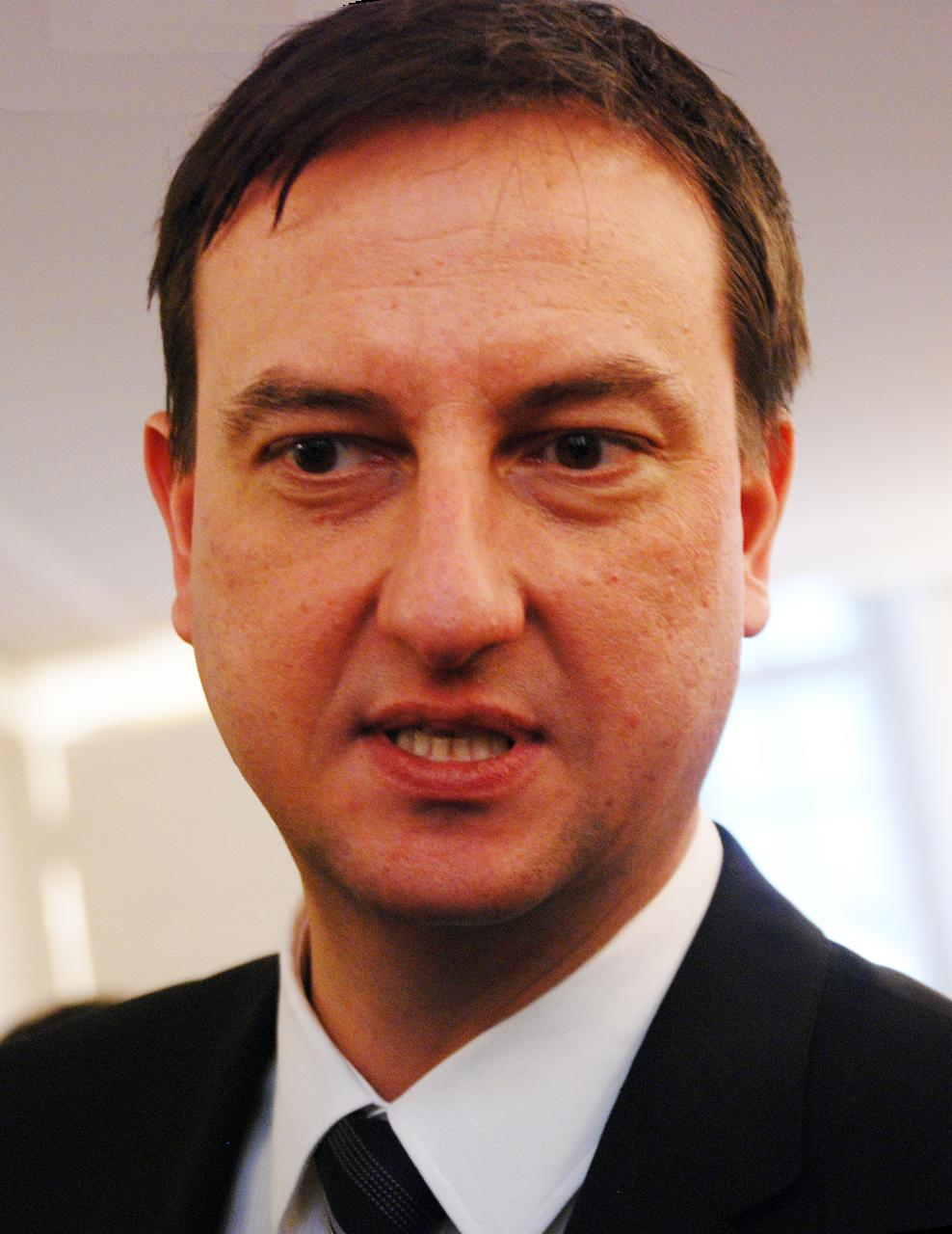
Daniel Krajcer

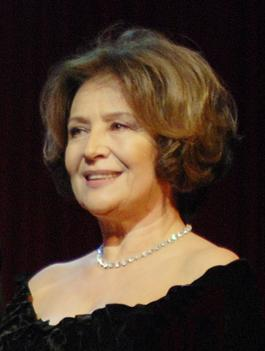
Emília Vášáryová

16 nominations

- Miroslav Žbirka

15 nominations

- Lenka Čviriková^{Ц}

14 nominations

- Patrik Herman
- Marcel Merčiak^{Щ}

13 nominations

- Zlatica Švajdová^{Ц}

12 nominations

- Viliam Rozboril

11 nominations

- Janko Kroner^{ЩΓ}
- Ján Plesník^{Ц}
- Adela Vinczeová^{Ц}

10 nominations

- Zuzana Smatanová
- Peter Varinský^{Ц}

9 nominations

- Jana Kirschner

8 nominations

- Maroš Kramár
- Daniel Krajcer^{Ц}
- Emília Vášáryová^{┼Ц}
- Martin Rausch^{Ц}
- Petra Polnišová^{Щ}

7 nominations

- Mário Kollár
- Andrej Bičan^{Щ}

6 nominations

- Zdena Studenková
- Michal Dočolomanský
- Jarmila Lajčáková^{Щ}
- Richard Müller
- Lucia Barmošová
- Ján Mečiar^{Ц}
- Jozef Kubáni

5 nominations

- Aneta Parišková^{Ц}
- Jana Majeská^{Ц}
- Stanislav Ščepán^{Ц}
- Lukáš Latinák^{Ц}
- Monika Hilmerová^{Ц}
- Ján Koleník^{Ц}
- Ľubomír Bajaník
- Zuzana Šebová^{Ц}
- Kristína

4 nominations

- Jozef Nodžák
- Peter Marcin^{Ц}
- Katarína Knechtová
- Alena Heribanová^{Ц}
- Peter Cmorik
- Ľuboš Kostelný^{Щ}
- Diana Mórová^{Ц}
- Tomáš Maštalír
- Marika Gombitová^{┼}
- Marián Čekovský
- Pavol Fejér
- Danica Kleinová
- Celeste Buckingham
- Fragile
- Štefan Eisele
- Marcel Forgáč
- Adam Ďurica
- IMT Smile

3 nominations

- Soňa Müllerová
- Jozef Pročko
- Miroslav Michalech
- Katarína Hasprová
- Miloš Bubán
- Kamila Magálová
- Misha
- Pavol Habera
- Jozef Ráž
- Magda Paveleková^{┼Ц}
- Martina Šimkovičová^{Ц}
- Zuzana Fialová
- Gabriela Dzuríková^{Щ}
- Alexander Bárta^{Ц}
- Zuzana Tlučková^{Ц}
- Miriam Šmahel (née Kalisová)
- Nela Pocisková
- Helena Krajčiová^{Ц}
- Peter Čambor^{Ц}
- Adriana Kmotríková
- Vladimír Voštinár
- Michal Hudák^{Ц}
- Mária Čírová
- Desmod

2 nominations

- Peter Kočiš
- Ivan Tásler
- Marianna Ďurianová
- Rastislav Žitný
- Viktória Ráková
- Elena Vacvalová^{Ц}
- Jaroslav Zápala
- Zdenka Predná
- Patrik Švajda
- Andrea Pálffy (née Belányiová)
- Ján Jackuliak^{Ц}
- Mária Chreneková (née Pietrová)
- Juraj Kemka
- Adam Zavřel
- Peter Bič Project
- Kveta Horváthová (née Kmotorková)
- Viktor Vincze
- Daniel Heriban
- Samuel Tomeček
- Veronika Ostrihoňová Cifrová
- Slávo Jurko
- Michal Kubovčík]]^{Ž}
- Tatiana Pauhofová
- Emma Drobná

1 nomination

- Ľubomír Karásek
- Ladislav Chudík^{┼}
- Zuzana Kronerová
- Eva Černá
- Milan Markovič
- Miroslav Noga
- Anna Šišková
- Július Satinský
- Branislav Ondruš
- Zuzana Hajdu
- Dorota Nvotová
- Emil Horváth^{┼}
- Dara Rolins
- Martin Vanek^{ф}
- Igor Adamec^{ф}
- Petra Jurínová
- Milan Lasica^{┼}
- Andy Kraus
- Peter Batthyany
- Michaela Čobejová
- Roman Juraško
- Erika Barkolová
- Roman Luknár
- Martina Kmeťová (alias Tina)
- Zuzana Kanócz
- Gabriela Marcinková
- Miroslava Almásy
- Ego (alias Michal Straka)
- Marcel Chlpík
- Sabína Grláková
- Juraj Loj
- Milan Zimnýkoval
- Elán
- Leona Kočkovičová (née Fučíková)^{†}
- Zuzana Mauréry
- Kristína Kövešová
- Boris Pršo
- Ján Tribula
- Lujza Garajová Schrameková
- Vladimír Kobielsky
- Ondrej Kandráč
- Lukáš Adamec
- Kandráčovci

Notes
^{ф} denotes a shared nomination
^{┼} Denotes an OTO honoree.
^{Ц} denotes a nominee in two main categories
^{Щ} denotes a nominee in three main categories
^{ЩΓ} denotes a nominee in four main categories
^{Ž} denotes a winner of the Život Award

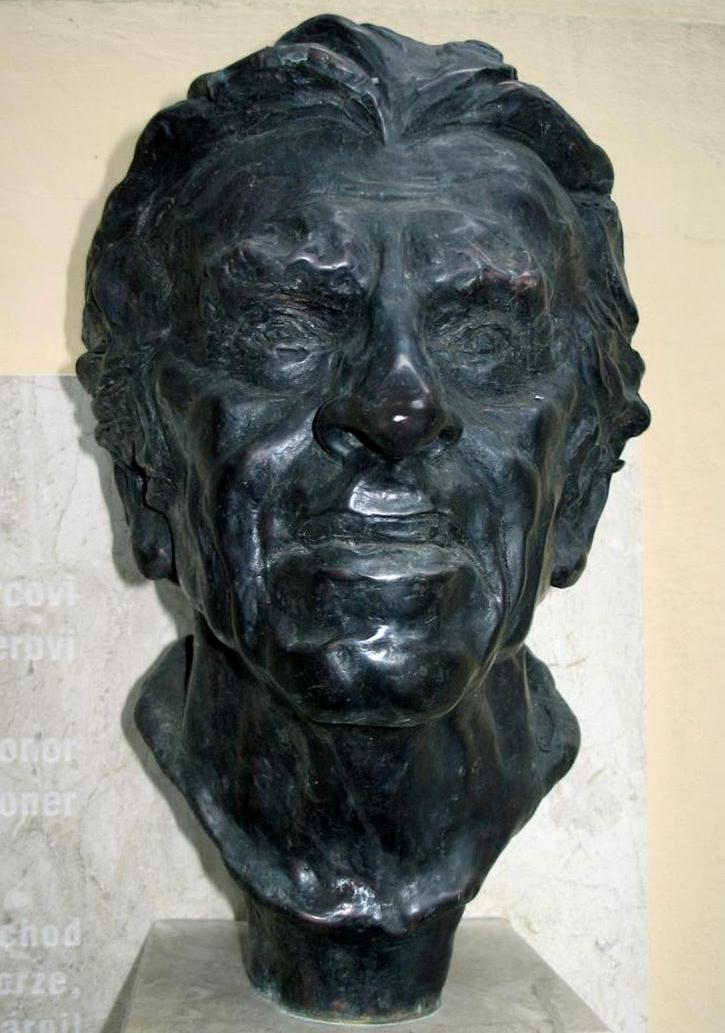
Jozef Kroner

=== Honorees-only ===
- Jozef Kroner^{†}
- Katarína Kolníková
- Eva Krížiková
- Pavol Mikulík
- Mária Kráľovičová
- Karol Machata
- Štefan Kvietik
- Stanislav Dančiak
- Dušan Gabáni
- Juraj Kukura
- Božidara Turzonovová
- Milan Kňažko

Notes
^{†} denotes an in memoriam-honoree
