= 9th OTO Awards =

Cultural award in Bratislava, Slovakia

9th OTO Awards

March 11, 2009

SND, Bratislava, Slovakia

Overall winner
Mário Kollár

Hall of Fame
Emília Vášáryová

Život Award
Mesto tieňov

KRAS Award
Vilomeniny

◄ 8th | 10th ►

The 9th OTO Awards, honoring the best in Slovak popular culture for the year 2008, took time and place on March 11, 2009, at the former Opera building of the Slovak National Theater in Bratislava. The ceremony broadcast live STV. The host of the show was Jozef Pročko, featuring guest appearances by Michal Hudák and Juraj Mokrý.

== Presenters ==
- Adela Banášová and Daniel Krajcer
- Peter Batthyany and Monika Hilmerová
- Ladislav Chudík and Štefan Nižňanský
- Csongor Kassai, Ľuboš Kostelný and Lukáš Latinák
- Boris Kollár and Jana Prágerová
- Maroš Kramár and Janko Kroner
- Petra Polnišová
- Juraj Vaculík

== Performers ==
- Michal Hudák and Juraj Mokrý
- IMT Smile, band
- Zuzana Mauréry, Nikol McCloud and Marcel Palonder, singers
- Tina, singer

== Winners and nominees ==
=== Main categories ===
Television

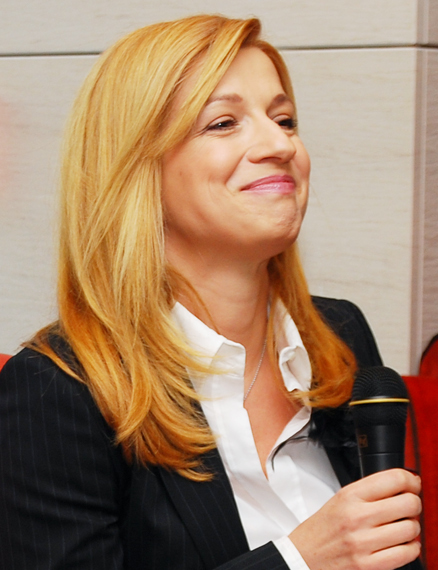
Jarmila Lajčáková

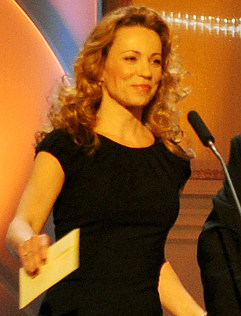
Diana Mórová

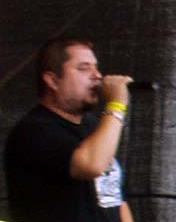
Mário Kollár alias "Kuly"

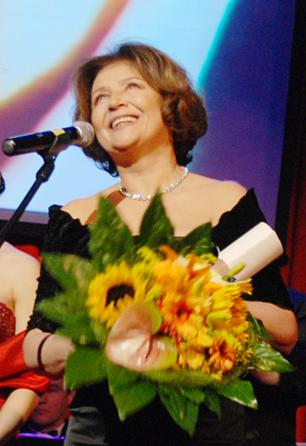
Emília Vášáryová

| News Host | Sports Host or Commentator |
|---|---|
| ★ Jarmila Lajčáková (née Hargašová): Patrik Švajda; Zlatica Švajdová | ★ Lenka Čviriková (née Hriadelová): Peter Čambor; Peter Varinský |
| Journalist | Entertainer |
| ★ Zlatica Švajdová (née Puškárová): Patrik Herman; Daniel Krajcer | ★ Adela Banášová: Martin Rausch; Viliam Rozboril |
| Actor | Actress |
| ★ Tomáš Maštalír: Janko Kroner; Alexander Bárta | ★ Diana Mórová: Michaela Čobejová; Zuzana Fialová |
| Program | Show |
| ★ Slovensko má talent – Markíza: Let's Dance – Markíza; Hodina deťom – STV | ★ Modré z neba – Markíza: Aj múdry schybí – Markíza; 5 proti 5 – STV |
Series
★ Ordinácia v ružovej záhrade – Markíza; Panelák – JOJ; Profesionáli – JOJ

Music

| Male Singer | Female Singer |
|---|---|
| ★ Mário Kollár: Miroslav Žbirka; Peter Cmorik | ★ Jana Kirschner: Katarína Knechtová; Zuzana Smatanová |

=== Others ===
| Overall winner | ★ Mário Kollár |
| Hall of Fame | ★ Emília Vášáryová |
| Život Award | ★ Mesto tieňov – Markíza |
| KRAS Award – TV Program Branding | ★ Vilomeniny – Markíza: Mesto tieňov – Markíza; Profesionáli – JOJ |

In addition, the winning actress Diana Mórová has been voted by public as the best-dressed woman of the ceremony in an online-based poll run by Topky.sk, accumulating 43%. The actress wore a champagne-golden colored gown by a local fashion designer, Andrea Paldan, including a set of jewels made of diamonds and golden topazes by Elen Russo. The runner-up Adela Banášová, she scored 26%, while Lenka Hriadelová received 17% of the total votes.

== Superlatives ==
=== Multiple nominees ===
2 nominations

- Zlatica Švajdová (née Puškárová)

== Reception ==
=== TV ratings ===
The broadcast of the awards gained Jednotka a 42.3% 12+ ratings share and was watched by 731,000 viewers, marking the second highest numbers for the show in the history and the most watched television program during prime time. Compared to its predecessor, the 9th OTO attracted 20,000 viewers more than in 2008. According to the STV network, the real-time event was the leader in all target groups that night, sharing audiences only with a TV JOJ series, Panelák.

=== The fine for Banášová ===
Almost two years later, the local Council for Broadcast and Retransmission (Rada pre vysielanie a retransmisiu) in Slovakia imposed on December 20, 2011, a fine of €3,000 to RTVS for "a prohibited direct support of sale, purchase and rental of goods, or services of the sponsor in the sponsored program OTO 2008", or rather for the Adela Banášová's acceptance speech during the event. She then said:

Well, I want to thank viewers of TV Markíza and [I] want to thank viewers of all televisions for [that], by means of their viewership, they create a pleasant competitive environment. I want to thank, I've spoken of TV Markíza twice to be sure, and [I] definitely believe [that] I am standing here also because I'm Fun Rádio, and so also this way.
