= 10th OTO Awards =

10th OTO Awards

March 13, 2010

SND, Bratislava, Slovakia

Overall winner
Adela Banášová

Hall of Fame
Štefan Kvietik

Život Award
Martin Mózer

◄ 9th | 11th ►

The 10th OTO Awards, honoring the best in Slovak popular culture for the year 2009, took time and place on March 13, 2010 at the former Opera building of the Slovak National Theater in Bratislava. The ceremony broadcast live STV. The hosts of the show were Michal Hudák and Štefan Skrúcaný.

== Presenters ==
- Adela Banášová and Tomáš Maštalír
- Peter Batthyany and Peter Sklár
- Peter Batthyany and Matej "Sajfa" Cifra
- Andrej Bičan and Daniel Dangl
- Zuzana Fialová and Janko Kroner
- Jarmila Lajčáková (née Hargašová) and Štefan Nižňanský
- Monika Hilmerová and Daniel Krajcer
- Renáta Klačanská
- Jana Kocianová, Marcela Laiferová and Eva Máziková
- Boris Kollár and Jana Prágerová
- Maroš Kramár and Diana Mórová, actors
- Lukáš Latinák and Petra Polnišová
- Juraj Lelkes and Miroslav Žbirka
- Svätopluk Malachovský and René Štúr
  (as Adonis Szabo and Igor Šrámek)
- Juraj Mokrý
- Soňa Müllerová
- Zdena Studenková and Jozef Vajda

== Performers ==
- Nina Balaščáková, child singer
- Michal Hudák, Juraj Mokrý and Štefan Skrúcaný
- Jana Kocianová, Marcela Laiferová and Eva Máziková, singers
- Zuzana Mauréry, Nikol McCloud, Sisa Sklovská and Anita Soul, singers

== Winners and nominees ==
=== Main categories ===
Television

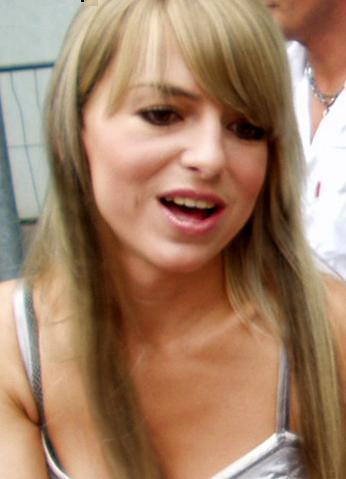
Zlatica Švajdová

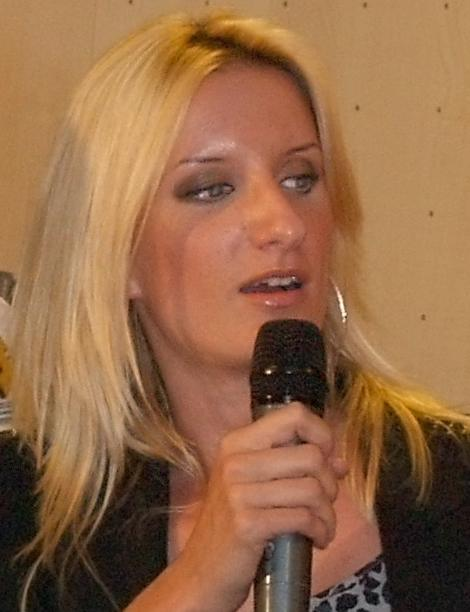
Adela Banášová

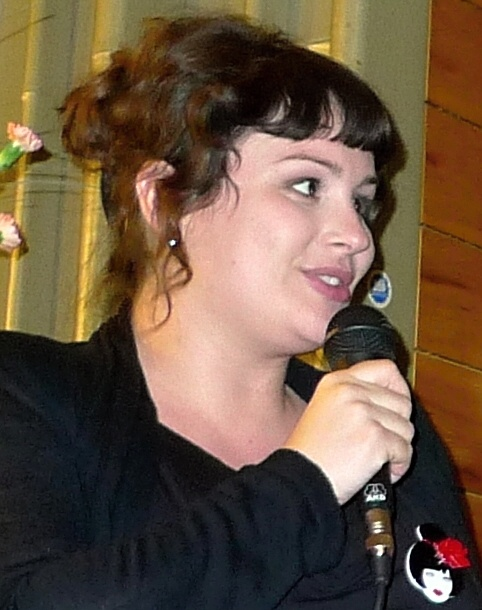
Petra Polnišová

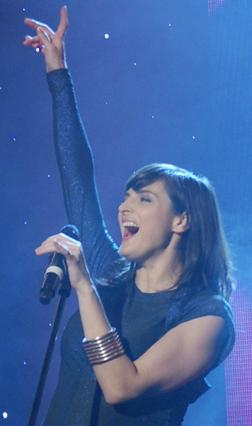
Jana Kirschner

News Host	Sports Host or Commentator
★ Lucia Barmošová: Jarmila Lajčáková (née Hargašová); Zlatica Švajdová	★ Lenka Čviriková (née Hriadelová): Peter Čambor; Peter Varinský
Journalist	Entertainer
★ Zlatica Švajdová (née Puškárová): Patrik Herman; Alena Heribanová	★ Adela Banášová: Martin Rausch; Viliam Rozboril
Actor	Actress
★ Janko Kroner: Ľuboš Kostelný; Alexander Bárta	★ Petra Polnišová: Gabriela Dzuríková; Emília Vášáryová
Program	Show
★ Česko Slovenská Superstar – Markíza: Novoročný príhovor tety Márgit – JOJ; Téma dňa – TA3	★ Modré z neba – Markíza: Partička – Markíza; Let's Dance – Markíza
Drama Series	Comedy Series
★ Ordinácia v ružovej záhrade – Markíza: Panelák – JOJ; Odsúdené – JOJ	★ Profesionáli – JOJ: MafStory – JOJ; Kutyil s.r.o. – JOJ

Music

Male Singer	Female Singer
★ Mário Kollár: Miroslav Žbirka; Peter Cmorik	★ Jana Kirschner: Katarína Knechtová; Zuzana Smatanová

=== Others ===
Overall winner	★ Adela Banášová
Hall of Fame	★ Štefan Kvietik
Život Award	★ Martin Mózer – JOJ

== Superlatives ==
=== Multiple nominees ===
2 nominations

- Zlatica Švajdová (née Puškárová)

== Reception ==
=== TV ratings ===
The show has gained on Jednotka a 37.1% ratings share among adults over 12 and, parallelly, 2.2% on the STV sister's channel Trojka. It garnered 734,000 and 44,000 viewers, making it a total audience of 778,000 viewers (39.3% share) on both RTVS networks and the most watched prime time TV program of the night in the region. Among adults aged 12–54, the totals were less; 32% with 394,000 viewers.
