= 13th OTO Awards =

13th OTO Awards

March 16, 2013

SND, Bratislava, Slovakia

Overall winner
Marcel Merčiak

Hall of Fame
Magda Paveleková

Život Award
Marcel Merčiak

◄ 12th | 14th ►

The 13th OTO Awards, honoring the best in Slovak popular culture for the year 2012, took time and place on March 16, 2013 on the New Opera stage of the Slovak National Theater in Bratislava. The ceremony broadcast live RTVS on Jednotka, the hosts of the show were Adela Banášová and Matej "Sajfa" Cifra.

== Presenters ==
- Dušan Gabáni, sports commentator
- Juraj Lelkes, Kooperatíva representative
- Ladislav Lučenič, musician
- Václav Mika, RTVS general manager
- Tom Nicholson
- Lukáš Pavlásek, comedian
- Karol Polák, sports commentator
- Sisa Sklovská, singer
- Miroslav Žbirka, musician

== Winners and nominees ==
=== Main categories ===
Television

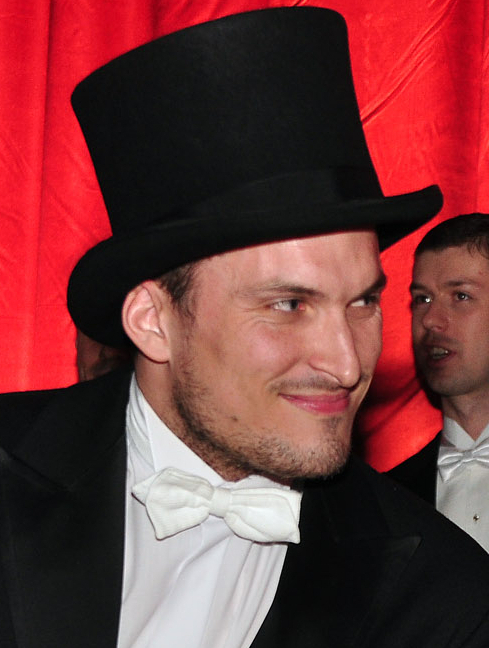
Ján Koleník

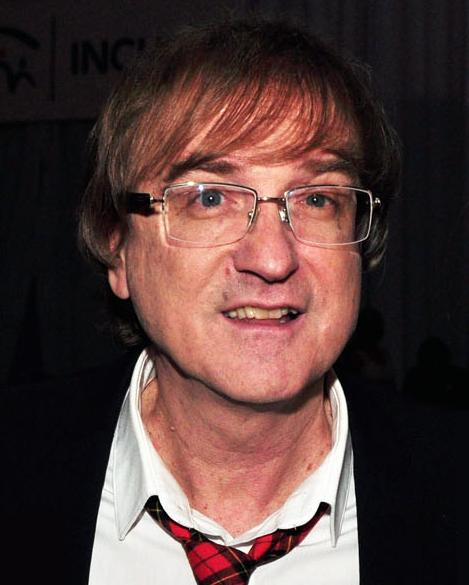
Miroslav Žbirka

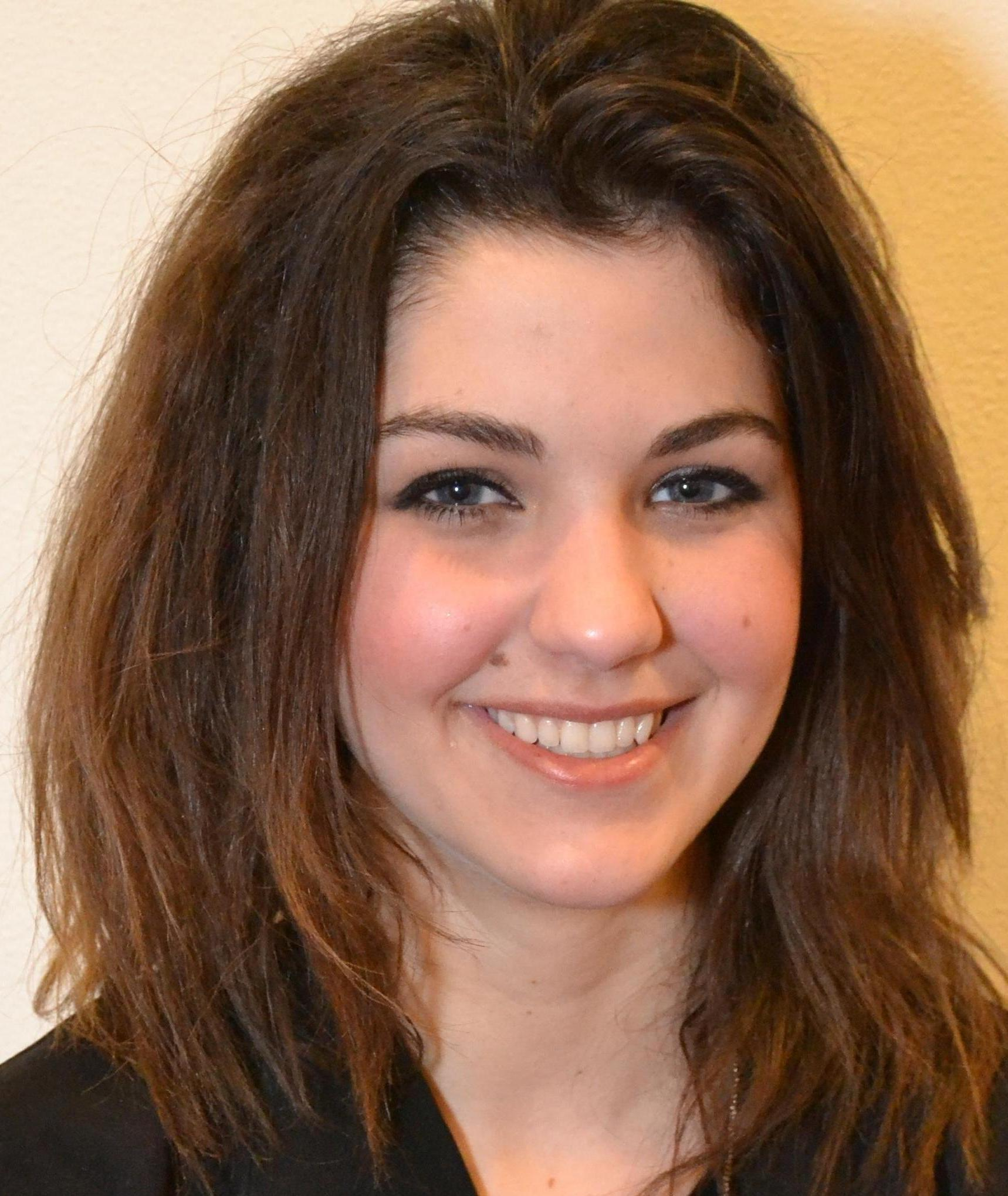
Celeste Buckingham

News Host	News Reporter
★ Lucia Barmošová: Ján Mečiar; Miriam Šmahel (née Kalisová)	★ Jozef Kubáni: Miroslava Almásy; Danica Kleinová
Sports Host	Sports Commentator
★ Lenka Čviriková (née Hriadelová): Marcel Merčiak; Peter Varinský	★ Marcel Merčiak: Ján Plesník; Stanislav Ščepán
Journalist	Entertainer
★ Patrik Herman: Ján Mečiar; Zlatica Švajdová (née Puškárová)	★ Andrej Bičan: Martin Rausch; Viliam Rozboril
Actor	Actress
★ Ján Koleník: Juraj Kemka; Lukáš Latinák	★ Monika Hilmerová: Zuzana Kanócz; Petra Polnišová
New Actor
★ Ján Jackuliak; Gabriela Marcinková; Zuzana Šebová
Program	Show
★ Srdce pre deti – JOJ: Česko Slovensko má talent – JOJ; MS v ľadovom hokeji 2012 – STV	★ Partička – Markíza: 5 proti 5 – STV; Legendy Popu – STV
Series
★ Panelák – JOJ; Horúca krv – Markíza; Profesionáli – JOJ

Music

Male Singer	Female Singer
★ Miroslav Žbirka: Marián Čekovský; Ego	★ Celeste Buckingham: Nela Pocisková; Zuzana Smatanová

=== Others ===
Overall winner	★ Marcel Merčiak
Hall of Fame	★ Magda Paveleková
Život Award	★ Marcel Merčiak

== Superlatives ==
In the main categories, Ján Mečiar and Marcel Merčiak received two simultaneous nominations, respectively. Merčiak scored one win, having also achieved two special awards as the first such recipient in the so far history of the poll.

=== Multiple nominees ===
2 nominations

- Ján Mečiar
- Marcel Merčiak

== Reception ==
=== TV ratings ===
The show has received a total audience of more than 587,000 viewers, making it the most watched television program within prime time in the region.
