= OTO Award for TV Series =

OTO Award
TV Series

Currently held by
Horná Dolná – Markíza

First awarded | Last awarded
2008 | Present

OTO Award for TV Series has been bestowed to the most recognized television series of the past year in Slovakia since 2008. In the year 2009, the accolade was given in two acting categories, depending on a genre such as TV drama and TV comedy. Since 2010, the general category is held.

== Winners and nominees ==
=== 2000s ===
Year	Recipient	Nominees
2000	Not awarded	
2001	Not awarded	
2002	Not awarded	
2003	Not awarded	
2004	Not awarded	
2005	Not awarded	
2006	Not awarded	
2007	Not awarded	
2008	★ Ordinácia v ružovej záhrade – Markíza	Panelák – JOJ; Profesionáli – JOJ
2009	Held only in genre	

=== 2010s ===
Year	Recipient	Nominees
2010	★ Profesionáli – JOJ	Ordinácia v ružovej záhrade – Markíza; Panelák – JOJ
2011	★ Panelák – JOJ (2 consecutive wins)	Profesionáli – JOJ; Hoď svišťom – JOJ
2012	★ Panelák – JOJ (2 consecutive wins)	Horúca krv – Markíza; Profesionáli – JOJ
2013	★ Búrlivé víno – Markíza (2 consecutive wins)	Dr. Dokonalý – JOJ; Chlapi neplačú – Markíza
2014	★ Búrlivé víno – Markíza (2 consecutive wins)	Panelák – JOJ; Profesionáli – JOJ
2015	★ Horná Dolná – Markíza (2 consecutive wins)	Doktor Martin – RTVS; Tajné životy – RTVS
2016	★ Horná Dolná – Markíza (2 consecutive wins)	Doktor Martin (season 2) – RTVS; Naši – JOJ
2017	★ Naši – JOJ	Horná Dolná – Markíza; Tajné životy – RTVS
2018	★ Oteckovia – Markíza	Milenky – Markíza; Som mama – JOJ

== Superlatives ==
=== Multiple winners ===
2 awards

- Panelák
- Horná Dolná

=== Multiple nominees ===
5 nominations

- Panelák
- Profesionáli

3 nominations

- Horná Dolná

2 nominations

- Ordinácia v ružovej záhrade
- Búrlivé víno
- Doktor Martin
- Naši
- Tajné životy

== Associated categories ==
OTO Award
TV Series – Drama

First awarded | Last awarded
2009

=== TV Series – Drama ===
Year	Recipient	Nominees
2009	★ Ordinácia v ružovej záhrade – Markíza	Panelák – JOJ; Odsúdené – JOJ

=== TV Series – Comedy ===
OTO Award
TV Series – Comedy

First awarded | Last awarded
2009

Year	Recipient	Nominees
2009	★ Profesionáli – JOJ	MafStory – JOJ; Kutyil s.r.o. – JOJ
