= OTO Award for TV Show – Entertainment =

OTO Award
TV Show – Entertainment

Currently held by
Milujem Slovensko – STV

First awarded | Last awarded
2005 | Present

OTO Award for TV Show – Entertainment has been bestowed to the most recognized television program of the past year in Slovak entertainment since 2005. The category includes various formats, such as a reality television, TV special, sitcom or else.

== Winners and nominees ==
=== 2000s ===
Year	Recipient	Nominees
2005	★ S.O.S. – STV	Uragán– STV; Inkognito – JOJ
2006	★ Susedia – Markíza (2 consecutive wins)	S.O.S.– STV; Inkognito – JOJ
2007	★ Susedia – Markíza (2 consecutive wins)	S.O.S.– STV; MafStory – JOJ
2008	★ Modré z neba – Markíza (2 consecutive wins)	Aj múdry schybí – Markíza; 5 proti 5 – STV
2009	★ Modré z neba – Markíza (2 consecutive wins)	Partička – Markíza; Let's Dance – Markíza

=== 2010s ===
Year	Recipient	Nominees
2010	★ Partička – Markíza (3 consecutive wins)	Modré z neba – Markíza; Adela Show – Markíza
2011	★ Partička – Markíza (3 consecutive wins)	Modré z neba – Markíza; 5 proti 5 – RTVS
2012	★ Partička – Markíza (3 consecutive wins)	5 proti 5 – RTVS; Legendy Popu – RTVS
2013	★ Milujem Slovensko – RTVS (4 consecutive wins)	5 proti 5 – RTVS; Modré z neba – Markíza
2014	★ Milujem Slovensko – RTVS (4 consecutive wins)	5 proti 5 – RTVS; Kredenc – Markíza
2015	★ Milujem Slovensko – RTVS (4 consecutive wins)	Kredenc – Markíza; Moja mama varí lepšie ako tvoja – JOJ
2016	★ Milujem Slovensko – RTVS (4 consecutive wins)	Dobre vedieť! – Markíza; Inkognito – JOJ

== Superlatives ==
=== Multiple winners ===
4 awards

- Milujem Slovensko

3 awards

- Partička

2 awards

- Susedia
- Modré z neba

=== Multiple nominees ===
5 nominations

- Modré z neba
- 5 proti 5

4 nominations

- Partička
- Milujem Slovensko

3 nominations

- S.O.S.
- Inkognito

2 nominations

- Susedia
- Kredenc
