= 6th OTO Awards =

6th OTO Awards

February 8, 2006

Expo Aréna, Bratislava, Slovakia

Overall winner
Maroš Kramár

Hall of Fame
Pavol Mikulík

EuroTelevízia Award
V politike

◄ 5th | 7th ►

The 6th OTO Awards, honoring the best in Slovak popular culture for the year 2005, took time and place on February 8, 2006, at the Incheba's Expo Aréna hall in Bratislava. The ceremony broadcast live STV. The host of the show was Karel Gott.

== Performers ==
- Peter Dvorský, opera singer
- Elán, band
- Karel Gott, singer
- Melánia Kasenčáková and Ján Mečoch (alias Lady Mel & Johnny Perfekto), dancers
- Dara Rolins and Tina, singers
- Miroslav Žbirka, singer

== Winners and nominees ==
=== Main categories ===
Television

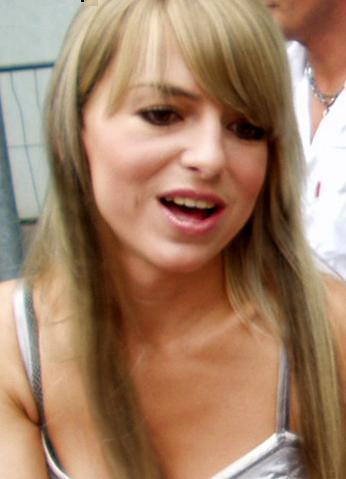
Zlatica Švajdová

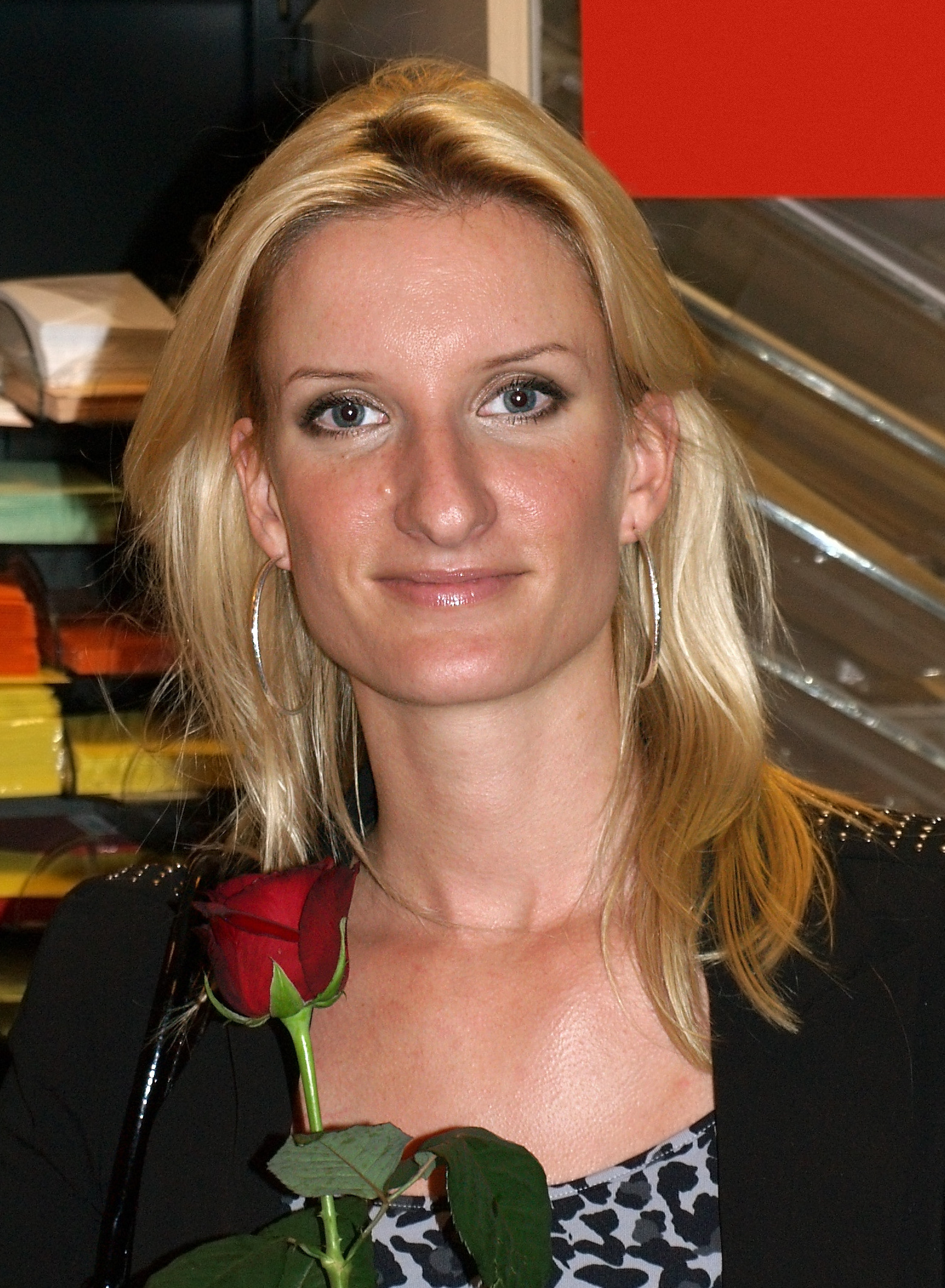
Adela Banášová

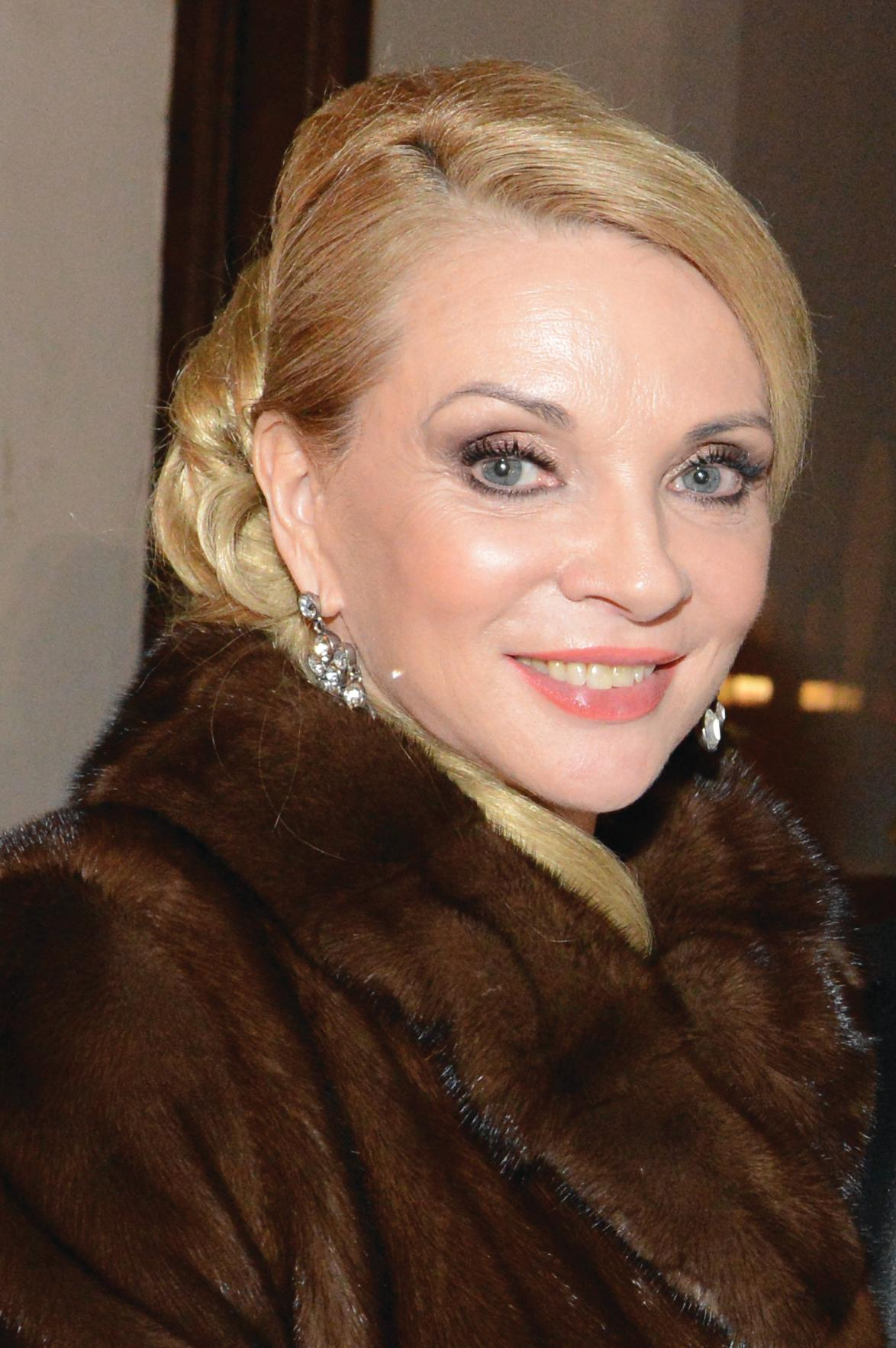
Zdena Studenková

| News Host | Sports Host or Commentator |
|---|---|
| ★ Aneta Parišková: Marianna Ďurianová; Jana Majeská | ★ Martina Šimkovičová (née Bartošíková): Lenka Čviriková (née Hriadelová); Ján Plesník |
| Journalist | Entertainer |
| ★ Zlatica Švajdová (née Puškárová): Patrik Herman; Daniel Krajcer | ★ Adela Banášová: Vladimír Voštinár; Peter Marcin |
| Actor | Actress |
| ★ Maroš Kramár: Michal Dočolomanský; Janko Kroner | ★ Zdena Studenková: Magda Paveleková; Emília Vášáryová |
| Program | Show |
| ★ Slovensko hľadá SuperStar – STV: VyVolení– JOJ; S.O.S. – STV | ★ S.O.S. – STV: Uragán– STV; Inkognito – JOJ |

Music

| Male Singer | Female Singer |
|---|---|
| ★ Miroslav Žbirka: Richard Müller; Jozef Ráž | ★ Zuzana Smatanová: Marika Gombitová; Jana Kirschner |

=== Others ===
| Overall winner | ★ Maroš Kramár |
| Hall of Fame | ★ Pavol Mikulík |
| EuroTelevízia Award | ★ V politike – TA3 |

== Superlatives ==
=== Multiple nominees ===
2 nominations

- S.O.S. – STV
