= OTO Award for TV Host – Entertainment =

Award

OTO Award
TV Host – Entertainment

First awarded | Last awarded
2000 | 2013

OTO Award for TV Host – Entertainment was awarded from the first until the 14th edition of the accolades, held in 2013. Each year, the award was presented to the most recognized television hosts in entertainers of the past year with the ceremony permitted live by the national television network STV.

== Winners and nominees ==
=== 2000s ===
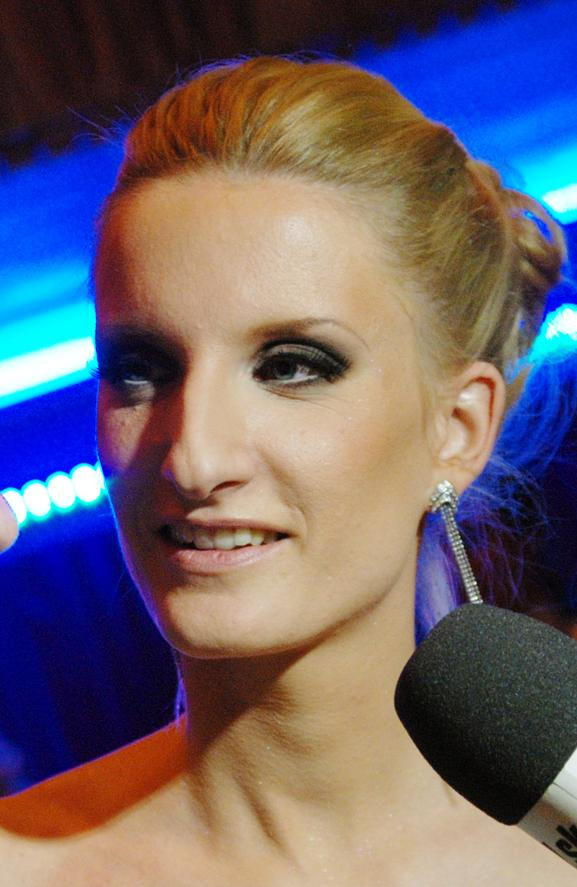
Adela Banášová runs the category as the most awarded TV host, overall six times.

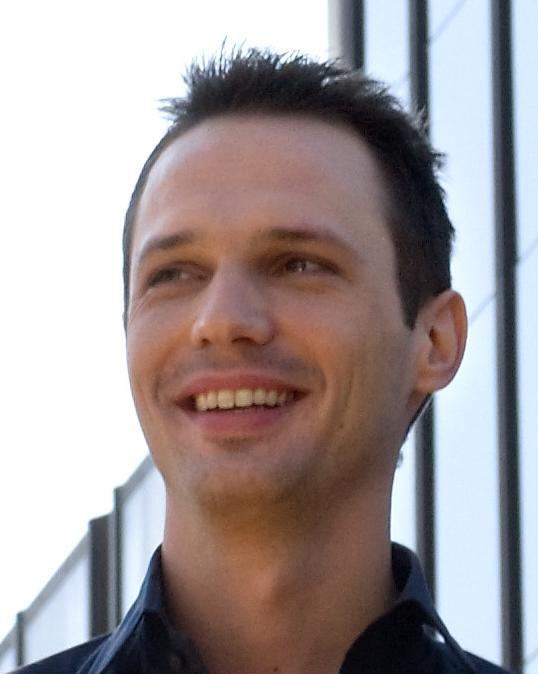
Martin Rausch alias "Pyco" has accumulated eight nominations, winning once.

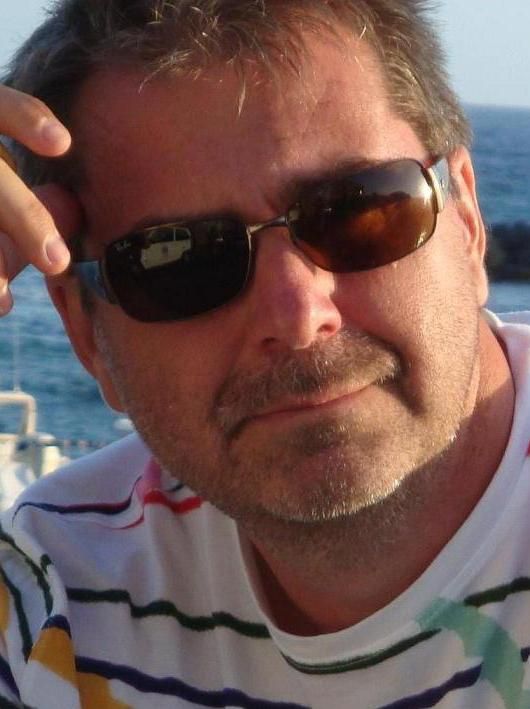
Peter Marcin has earned one win, out of three nominations.

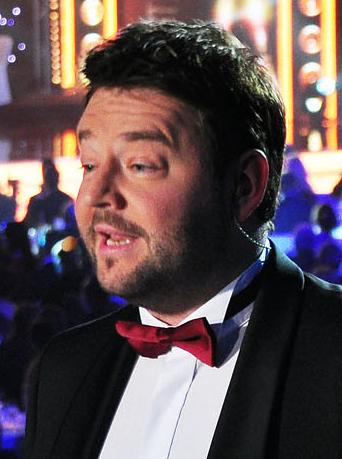
Michal Hudák has been a single nominee, for a change.

Year	Recipient	Nominees
2000	★ Jozef Pročko (3 consecutive wins)	Milan Markovič; Viliam Rozboril
2001	★ Jozef Pročko (3 consecutive wins)	Peter Kočiš; Viliam Rozboril
2002	★ Jozef Pročko (3 consecutive wins)	Viliam Rozboril; Elena Vacvalová
2003	★ Peter Marcin	Magda Paveleková; Peter Kočiš; Vladimír Voštinár
2004	★ Viliam Rozboril	Peter Marcin; Michal Hudák
2005	★ Adela Banášová (6 consecutive wins)	Vladimír Voštinár; Peter Marcin
2006	★ Adela Banášová (6 consecutive wins)	Viliam Rozboril; Martin Rausch
2007	★ Adela Banášová (6 consecutive wins)	Martin Rausch; Viliam Rozboril
2008	★ Adela Banášová (6 consecutive wins)	Martin Rausch; Viliam Rozboril
2009	★ Adela Banášová (6 consecutive wins)	Martin Rausch; Viliam Rozboril

=== 2010s ===
Year	Recipient	Nominees
2010	(See above)	Martin Rausch; Viliam Rozboril
2011	★ Martin Rausch	Viliam Rozboril; Adela Banášová
2012	★ Andrej Bičan (2 consecutive wins)	Martin Rausch; Viliam Rozboril
2013	★ Andrej Bičan (2 consecutive wins)	Martin Rausch; Viliam Rozboril

== Superlatives ==
=== Multiple winners ===
6 awards

- Adela Banášová^{†}

3 awards

- Jozef Pročko

2 awards

- Andrej Bičan

=== Multiple nominees ===
12 nominations

- Viliam Rozboril

8 nominations

- Martin Rausch

7 nominations

- Adela Banášová

3 nominations

- Jozef Pročko
- Peter Marcin^{┼†}

2 nominations

- Peter Kočiš
- Vladimír Voštinár
- Andrej Bičan

Notes

^{┼} Denotes also a winner in two or more of the main categories.
^{†} Denotes also a winner of the Absolute OTO category.
