= Branislav Ondruš =

Slovak politician and MEP (born 1973)

Member of the European Parliament for Slovakia
- Incumbent
- Assumed office 16 July 2024

State Secretary at the Ministry of Labour, Social Affairs and Family
- In office 1 November 2023 – 2024
- In office 10 April 2012 – 18 March 2020

Member of the National Council
- In office 8 July 2010 – 4 April 2012

Personal details
- Born: 28 March 1973 (age 53) Levoča, Czechoslovakia (now Slovakia)
- Party: Independent (2026–present)
- Education: Comenius University (political science)
- Occupation: Politician, journalist, political scientist

Branislav Ondruš (born 28 March 1973) is a Slovak politician, journalist and political scientist who has served as a Member of the European Parliament (MEP) since July 2024. He was elected on the list of Hlas – sociálna demokracia (Hlas–SD) and sits as a non-attached member. Before entering the European Parliament, he worked as a television journalist and later served as state secretary at the Slovak Ministry of Labour, Social Affairs and Family.

== Early life and education ==
Ondruš was born in Levoča on 28 March 1973 and grew up in Spišská Nová Ves. He studied political science at the Faculty of Arts of Comenius University in Bratislava and also studied European political systems at Thames Valley University in London. His European Parliament CV lists him as vice-chair and later chair of the Youth Council of Slovakia between 1993 and 1996.

== Journalism, writing and early public career ==
Ondruš began his professional career in 1996 at TV Markíza, where he worked as a news presenter, economic editor and commentator. From 2002 to 2008 he worked as an editor and presenter of news at TV JOJ. He subsequently spent two years as director of the press and information department of the Government Office of the Slovak Republic.

Alongside his television work, Ondruš published analyses, commentaries and interviews in the left-wing weekly Nové slovo, focusing mainly on socio-economic public policy and later also on environmental topics such as nature protection in construction and transport and the replacement of fossil fuels. A 2012 Trend article refers to a 2006 Nové slovo interview conducted by Ondruš with Robert Fico on pension reform, and the Nové slovo archive later listed him among contributors at the weekly's 75th-anniversary event. As a journalist he also supported public-interest development projects, including the pilot scheme of Roma assistants in kindergartens and primary schools; in parliament he later referred to the Roma teacher-assistant scheme in a debate on education and social inclusion.

== National political career ==
Ondruš was among the founders and the first chair of Mladá demokratická ľavica (Young Democratic Left), a youth organisation linked to the post-communist Party of the Democratic Left (SDĽ). His European Parliament CV lists him as vice-chair and later chair of the Youth Council of Slovakia between 1993 and 1996. In the same period he joined the steering committee of a Council of Europe campaign against racism, nationalism and xenophobia, representing national youth councils from Central and Eastern Europe. A member of SDĽ from its foundation, he was elected to its executive committee in 1995 and, at the party's 2000 congress in Košice, as its first vice-chair; his responsibilities included social policy, regional policy and international relations.

He returned to frontline politics in June 2010, when he was elected to the National Council for Smer–SD, and served as vice-chairman of its social affairs committee. The Slovak parliament's official member database lists him as a Smer–SD candidate born on 28 March 1973.

According to his European Parliament curriculum vitae, Ondruš served as Secretary of State at the Ministry of Labour, Social Affairs and Family from 10 April 2012 to 18 March 2020. His portfolio covered employment and labour, including labour law and occupational safety and health, social dialogue and tripartite negotiations, and European affairs; he represented Slovakia in the EPSCO Council formation. In October 2019 he presented Slovakia's position in a dialogue with the UN Committee on Economic, Social and Cultural Rights, where he discussed labour-law enforcement, sectoral collective agreements and minimum-wage setting.

At the labour ministry, Ondruš was closely associated with the preparation of Slovakia's first social-economy legislation. In September 2017 the ministry said it had prepared a new law on social economy and social enterprises and quoted Ondruš arguing that social economy should be linked with the market economy; the resulting Act No. 112/2018 on social economy and social enterprises was adopted in 2018. In European social-economy policy, he signed the 2015 Luxembourg Declaration on the Social and Solidarity Economy in Europe as Slovak state secretary; the Luxembourg presidency quoted him as saying that a "new paradigm" had emerged in which the economy should serve citizens and society, and that decent work and the impact of digitisation and automation would be priorities of the 2016 Slovak Council presidency.

After leaving domestic office in 2020, Ondruš worked externally as an expert and adviser for state institutions in Western Balkan countries within European Commission-funded reform support, including work linked to the Youth Guarantee in North Macedonia. He also worked on EU expert and twinning projects in the region and in Georgia; in 2024 he told Imedi TV that he had been working on Georgia for ten years and had led EU expert teams there.

Ondruš returned to the labour ministry as state secretary on 1 November 2023. In November 2023 he represented Slovakia at the EPSCO Council in Brussels, where the ministry said he supported the proposed European disability-card and parking-card rules and spoke in favour of social investment and social dialogue. He also represented the ministry at a European social-economy conference in San Sebastián, where he said social economy should be promoted as a tool for regional development and social inclusion.

His European Parliament declaration of private interests lists his pre-election roles as president of Social Economy Slovakia and state secretary at the labour ministry; it also lists post-election outside activities as adviser to the labour minister and twinning project leader.

== European Parliament ==
Ondruš was elected to the European Parliament in the 2024 election. Hlas–SD won one seat, which went to Ondruš after he overtook the party's lead candidate through preferential voting. He took office on 16 July 2024. In the tenth parliamentary term, he is a member of the Committee on Employment and Social Affairs (EMPL) and the Committee on International Trade (INTA).

In May 2026 Ondruš announced that he was leaving Hlas–SD in connection with his candidacy for president of the Confederation of Trade Unions of the Slovak Republic (KOZ). He said the decision was linked to the view within KOZ that its president should not simultaneously be a party member, and confirmed that he did not plan to give up his European Parliament mandate if elected.

== Other activities ==
Branislav Ondruš is also a long-standing member of the Slovak Union of Anti-Fascist Fighters (SZPB). For more than three years he served in an unpaid position as editor-in-chief of the SZPB magazine Bojovník; he is currently a member of the presidium of the SZPB regional committee in Lučenec and a member of the SZPB Central Council. He co-organises and takes part in many of the union’s activities, in particular those connected with commemorations of the liberation of Slovak towns and villages from the rule of German Nazis and their Slovak collaborators, anniversaries of the Slovak National Uprising, and the victory over fascism in Slovakia and Europe.

== Selected publications and public writing ==
Ondruš is listed as a co-author of analytical and expert publications on employment and the labour market. One verifiable example is the 2017 study Minimálna mzda – empirické zistenia kontra ideologické mýty (The Minimum Wage: Empirical Findings versus Ideological Myths), co-authored with Ivana Štefánková, Peter Líška and Tomáš Kramer for the Implementation Agency of the Ministry of Labour, Social Affairs and Family.

The Slovak labour ministry's EU-funds portal lists analytical outputs of the national project “Support for the Quality of Social Dialogue 2”, including NEET v SR – s kým a ako, Práce pre domácnosť ako forma práce – potenciál a bariéry v podmienkach, Nové formy práce – riziká a príležitosti, Sociálna politika zamestnávateľa and Ekonomické a sociálne prínosy sociálneho podnikania v SR. These correspond to several English titles attributed to Ondruš in the Slovak draft: The Slovak labour ministry's EU-funds portal lists analytical outputs of the national project “Support for the Quality of Social Dialogue 2”, including NEET v SR – s kým a ako, Práce pre domácnosť ako forma práce – potenciál a bariéry v podmienkach, Nové formy práce – riziká a príležitosti, Sociálna politika zamestnávateľa and Ekonomické a sociálne prínosy sociálneho podnikania v SR. Where direct PDFs are available, the corresponding English titles attributed to Ondruš in the Slovak draft are linked individually below:

- Life-long "flexi-account": analysis of feasibility of implementation in the Slovak Republic (2014)
- NEET in Slovakia – how and whom with? (2019)
- Household services as a job form – risks and opportunities in Slovakia (2021)
- New forms of work – risks and opportunities (2021)
- Social Policy of Employers (2022)
- Challenges of social entrepreneurship in Slovakia (2023)

His current political commentary is published on his official website and he has also contributed opinion pieces to Nové slovo.
