= Jozef Kroner Awards =

Annual art awards in Slovakia

- Awarded for: Outstanding achievements and lasting contributions in theater, film, television, radio and/or dubbing.
- Country: Slovakia
- Presented by: Kroner Foundation in conjunction with the National Center of Culture and the Kysuce Culture Foundation
- First award: 2001
- Website: http://www.nocka.sk

The Jozef Kroner Awards (in Slovak: Cena Jozefa Kronera) are bestowed annually since 2001 by the Jozef Kroner Foundation, which was established after the death of Jozef Kroner to remember his art and personality.

The awards are presented in two categories. For lasting contribution to the world of theatre (lifelong work), and for the most remarkable achievement in the area of theatre, film, television, radio or the art of dubbing.

In 2001-2005 awards were presented in Bratislava, but since 2006 they have been presented in the Jozef Gregor Tajovský Theatre in Zvolen. From 2004 the Jozef Kroner Foundation extended the scope of the Jozef Kroner Awards by including amateur actors. Awards in this category are presented on the occasion of Scenic Harvest in Martin.

== Winners ==
- Ladislav Chudík
- Andrej Mojžiš
- Jozef Dóczy
- Milan Sládek
- Karol L Zachar
- Elo Romančík
- Leopold Haverl
- Emília Vášáryová
- Emil Horváth
- Marián Geišberg
- Eva Krížiková
- Milan Kiš
- Ivan Vojtek Sr
- Vladimír Rohoň
- Mária Kráľovičová
- Eugen Libezňuk
- Kveta Stražanová
- Dušan Jamrich
- Božidara Turzonovová
