= Mesto tieňov =

- Created by: Stano Dančiak ml. Roman Olekšák; Otília Jurikovičová
- Starring: Look starring
- Theme music composer: Michal Novinski; Jan P. Muchow; Slavo Solovic
- Opening theme: Lucia Šipošová - Tiene miznú (Shadows disappear)
- Country of origin: Slovakia
- Original language: Slovak
- No. of seasons: 2
- No. of episodes: 20

Production
- Production location: Bratislava
- Running time: 60 minutes

Original release
- Network: Markíza
- Release: April 11, 2008 – February 23, 2012

Mesto tieňov or City of the Shadows, is a Slovak crime TV series which debuted on April 11, 2008 on the Markíza network. It was produced by the DNA production company with its episodes based on real life events.

The TV series received the "Televízna udalosť roka" Award (Television Event of Year) by film critics.

== Casts and characters ==
Name of characters	Role in team	Name of actor
Mr. Ivan Tomeček	Criminalist, team leader of investigators	Pavel Višňovský
2nd. Lt. Tomáš Benkovský	Criminalist, investigator	Marián Mitaš
2nd Lt. Jana Holíková	Forensic psychologist	Soňa Norisová
2nd Lt. Sergej Kopriva	Criminalist, investigator	Ladislav Hrušovský
2nd Lt. Oliver Bachratík	Criminalist, investigator	Róbert Jakab
M.D. Jozef Benkovský	Forensic doctor	Anton Vaculík
cpt. Rudo Uhrík	Criminalist, archivist	Ivan Vojtek
Lt. Col. Milan Horký	Supervisor of Department for Violent Crimes (Oddelenie násilnej kriminality)	Ivan Romančík

== Episode characters ==
- Martin Rausch
- Szidi Tobias
- Vlado Černý
- Vladimír Jedľovský
- Petra Polnišová
- Juraj Ďurdiak
- Zuzana Šebová

== List of episodes ==
=== Season 1: 2008 ===
Number	Number in season	Title	Director	Original air date
1	1	Záchvat ľudskosti“ (Attack of Humanity)	Róbert Šveda	11 April 2008
Midnight ambush by unknown perpetrators velkosklad flowers Stanislava Krekovič. Machine gunfire killed four people and the perpetrators steal a few million. Only a child survives the massacre. The same day rookie Tomas Benkovský is on board ONK, who at his own request was transferred to the capital. The very first day of work awaits him investigating the brutal mass murder ...
Number	Number in season	Title	Director	Original air date
2	2	„Smrteľný žart“ (Deadly Joke)	Peter Bebjak	18 April 2008
Investigators Ivana Tomečka concerned about problem behavior of his daughter, who skipped school and socializes with hooligans. He begins to worry about her. Drug dealer - Sklenára is killed at a brothel. The murder witness was not blindfolded, so the killer can be identified. Threads lead towards drug traffickers, but the revelation of the real perpetrator is shocking ...
Number	Number in Season	Title	Director	Original air date
3	3	„Chladnokrvne“ (Phlegmatically)	Róbert Šveda	25 April 2008
A decomposed arm is found leading to a corpse in an iron overload and blacksmith vessel. The identity of the murdered brings a number of questions and almost no answers. Then it turns out that the cold-blooded crime hides a ruthless and despotic killer . In addition, the police raids and arrests Ivana Tomečka's daughter . Ivana is afraid that his daughter takes drugs ...
Number	Number in Season	Title	Director	Original air date
4	4	„Koniec sveta I.“ (End of the World I.)	Peter Bebjak	2 May 2008
Investigators find a tortured body of a homeless man who was to testify before the police station. Investigators are convinced that an organized group is responsible for this. The number of corpses of homeless people rises and their communities are afraid. Tomáš Benkovský attempts to infiltrate the community and yet mysteriously disappears ...
Number	Number in Season	Title	Director	Original air date
5	5	„Koniec sveta II.“ (End of the World II.)	Peter Bebjak	9 May 2008
Tomáš Benkovský disappeared without a trace and searching for him does not bring any results. Chief Investigator Ivan Tomeček is under great pressure as a murder investigation went wrong. A few days later the investigators get information leading to Thomas, however, they are not sure if he is still alive because it was believed that he came across the hands of a monster in human skin...
Number	Number in Season	Title	Director	Original air date
6	6	„Úmyselné nehody“ (Advisedly Accident)	Róbert Šveda	16 May 2008
Lorry driver runs over a young woman, and the investigation reveals that at the time of the accident she was already dead. Investigators look for suspects as they find out that a rich and successful businessman also died under similar mysterious circumstances. The investigation leads to the deep past...
Number	Number in Season	Title	Director	Original air date
7	7	„Lúpež“ (Robbery)	Peter Bebjak	23 May 2008
In a small town some ambushes mail. Zasřelí while the local policeman. The case is summoned detectives from the capital, which local residents who are craving for revenge do not like. Investigators from ONK encounter when working with the resistance of local police officers. In addition, residents of the town are convinced that the killer knows and want revenge. In the air hangs lynching! Young criminologist Thomas Benkovský must face in investigating personal tragedy ...
Number	Number in Season	Název	Director	Original air date
8	8	„Únos“ (Kidnapping)	Gejza Dezorz	30 May 2008
The family pet Gallovičových tragedy occurs. The same night two children are missing from the family's home. Investigators must act quickly. Additionally, they are not sure whether it is a case of kidnapping or murder. The investigation will bring surprising and shocking results ...
Number	Number in Season	Title	Director	Original air date
9	9	„Sériový vrah“ (Serial Killer)	Róbert Šveda	6 June 2008
In the forest near the city, the skeleton of a young woman is found. Detectives suspect that in their city lurks a serial killer. Investigator Ivan Tomeček faces a real risk that one of the victims was his own child. The offender is convicted for the big ONK problem - most of the murdered have been dead for several years, and no traces of bodies are found ...
Number	Number in Season	Title	Director	Original air date
10	10	„Nebezpečné vzťahy“ (Dangerous Relations)	Gejza Dezorz	13 June 2008
A young girl appeared in the hospital. It is missing Eva Tomečková. Major Tomeček takes justice into his own hands. Tomáš Benkovský respects his behavior...

== Books ==
- 2008 - Marek Zákopčan - Mesto tieňov 1, Ikar ISBN 80-551-1696-2
- 2008 - Marek Zákopčan - Mesto tieňov 2, Ikar ISBN 80-551-1784-5
