= Jana Kocianová =

Slovak singer

- Born: 8 June 1946; Šaštín-Stráže, Czechoslovakia
- Died: 23 September 2018 (aged 72) Bratislava, Slovakia
- Occupation: Singer
- Instrument: Vocals

Jana Kocianová (8 June 1946 — 23 September 2018) was a Slovak singer.

Kocianová was born in Šaštín-Stráže. Even though she wanted to be an artist, she studied Pharmacology at the Comenius University, due to her parents' disapproval of her artistic ambitions.

Kocianová was a well known performer of Black music, in particular jazz, gospel and beat. She often performed together with Karel Gott. She also cooperated with the comedic duo Milan Lasica and Július Satinský, for whom the collaboration represented an important public outlet as their performances were commonly banned by the regime. She won the prestigious socialist-era singing competition Bratislavská lýra three times over the course of 1970s and 1980s.

Kocianová was married to drummer Josef Skvaril for nearly 50 years. She succumbed to breast cancer in 2018.
