= Emília Vášáryová =

Slovak actress (born 1942)

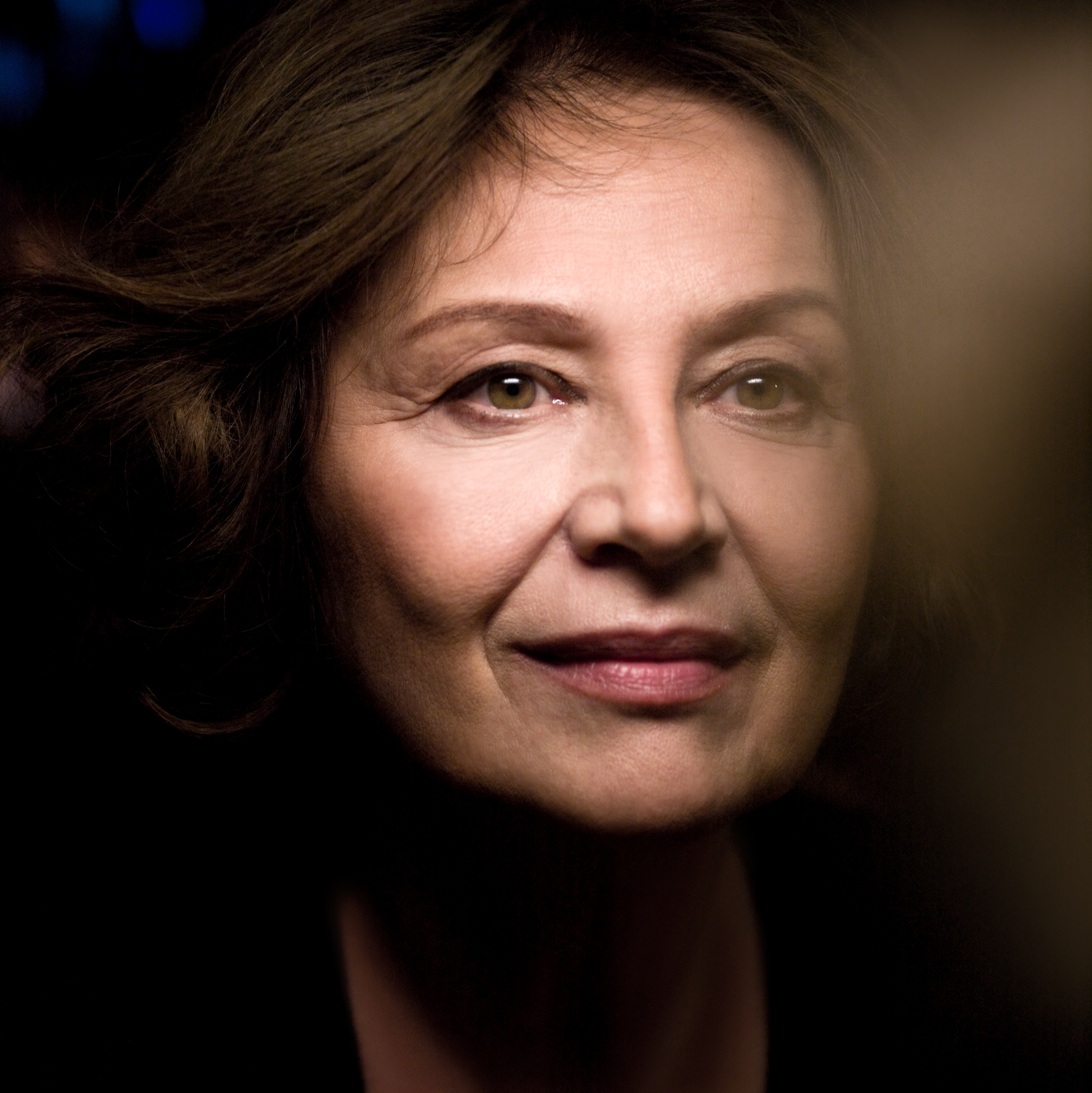
- Born: 18 May 1942 (age 84); Horná Štubňa, Slovak Republic
- Other names: Milka Vášáryová; Emília Vášáryová-Horská; Emília Čorbová (per marriage)
- Occupations: Actress; professor
- Years active: 1958–present
- Employers: NS, Bratislava (1963–64); SND, Bratislava (since 1964)
- Organization(s): VŠMU, Bratislava
- Spouses: Ivan Horský (m. 1968; div. 1976) Milan Čorba (m. 1977; w. 2013)
- Children: 2
- Relatives: Magdaléna Vášáryová (sister); Milan Lasica (brother-in-law)
- Website: Slovak National Theater

Emília Vášáryová, Doctor Artis Dramaticae (hon.) (Slovak pronunciation: [ˈemiːlija ˈʋaːʂarijɔʋa]; born 18 May 1942) is a Slovak stage and screen actress, whom Variety and other publications refer to as the "First Lady of Slovak Theater". During a career of more than five decades, she has received numerous awards including Meritorious Artist (1978), the Alfréd Radok Award (1996), the Czech Lion Award, the Golden Goblet Award (2008), and a 2010 ELSA award from the Czech Film and Television Academy (2010). Because her younger sister is former diplomat Magdaléna Vášáryová, the daily newspaper iDNES said fans consider her an "Honorary Consul of Czech and Slovak Relations".

== Biography ==
=== Early years ===
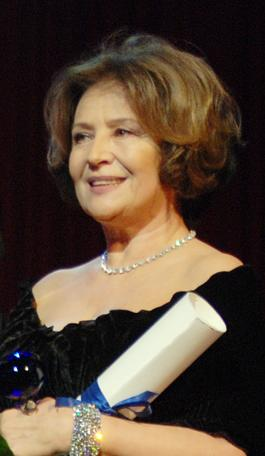
Vášáryová at the 2011 Bratislavský bál, honored with the Bratislavian Blueberry Award

Vášáryová was born in Horná Štubňa, the First Slovak Republic. However, and along with younger sister Magdaléna (who also became a popular actor), she was raised in Banská Štiavnica, where both their parents taught. Her father, Jozef Vášáry was a member of a Hungarian noble family. He taught Slovak literature and grammar at a gymnasium. Her mother, Hermína, taught German.

As a child and young woman, Vášáryová participated in amateur theater and gymnastics. While at JSŠ high school in Štiavnica, she received a cameo role in the Slovak/Hungarian film St. Peter's Umbrella. She had an uncredited role as a servant girl with only one line, "I'm coming, I'm coming!".

=== 1960s ===
She hoped to study languages or art history at university, but she lacked the so-called "confidential files" (issued by Communist Party of Czechoslovakia). Eventually she was able to enroll at the Academy of Performing Arts in Bratislava to study theater.

During college she had supporting roles in two black-and-white films, Marching Is Not Always Fun (1960), and Midnight Mass (1962). The film Young Ages (1962) also marked her television debut. Her big break came when she was cast in the lead (as "Diana") in Vojtěch Jasný's The Cassandra Cat, in which a magic cat reveals the true nature of everyone he sees. It premiered at the 1963 Cannes Film Festival, taking two major awards, the C.S.T. Prize and Special Jury prize. The film also won awards at various international festivals in Spain, Greece, Colombia, and Italy.

In December 1963, A Face at the Window (directed by Peter Solan) opened with her cast alongside leads Ladislav Chudík and Štefan Kvietik, both of whom had a significant impact on her career. The following year Chudík invited her to join the ensemble of the Slovak National Theatre, over the objections of some of the senior actors who thought she was too young and inexperienced for such a prominent national stage. She did bring some experience to this opportunity, however, because she had previously spent one season at the Bratislava main stage New Scene. Thanks to the influence of Magda Husáková-Lokvencová, wife of Czech President Gustáv Husák, she appeared in four productions.

Her debut rule at the national playhouse was as Ophelia in Hamlet. In 1967 she received the Janko Borodáč award on the basis of two roles, Helena in Shakespeare's A Midsummer Night's Dream, and Florelle in Lope de Vega's comedy The Dancing Master.

I didn't want to be an actress, and so I'd cry out whole days – that's what Magda [sister] says at least. I don't much recall it yet.

— Emília Vášáryová

She also became more prominent in feature films, including A Jester's Tale, which drew international attention when it brought director Karel Zeman two awards at the San Francisco IFF '64 (for Best Film and Best Direction), and also first prize at Addis Ababa IFF '64 in Ethiopia.

Her other feature films include St. Elizabeth Square (1965), Master Executioner (1966), Trailer People (1966), The Dragon's Return (1967) and There's No Other Way (1968). During this period, Vášáryová also launched her television career, receiving Most Popular Actress in Brno in 1967, and winning the first edition of the national TV contest Golden Croc in 1968.^{[X]}

=== 1970s ===
Along with acting onstage (in Herodes and Herodias by Pavol Országh Hviezdoslav, Gorky's Vassa Zheleznova and The Last Ones, Palárik's Thanksgiving Adventure, the Sophocles play Antigone and Leo Tolstoy and Erwin Piscator's War and Peace, Vášáryová continued her television career, with roles in The Balade for the Seven Hanged (1968), Parisian Mohicans (1971), Noodledom (1971), The Shepherd Wife (1972), Monna Vanna (1973), and Impatient Heart (1974; in which her sister Magda co-starred). She was cast in several films, including Copper Tower, directed by Martin Hollý Jr. (who had collaborated with Vášáryová in The Balade for the Seven Hanged), which earned a Special Prize at the 21st Film Festival of Proletariats (FFP) in 1970. Martin Ťapák's The Day Which Does Not Die received various domestic awards for best director and best lead male actor for Štefan Kvietik).

The second half of the 70s was a successful period, and she performed strong roles in both film and theater. She played "Zuza" in Who Leaves in the Rain (directed by Martin Hollý Jr), and she received in Prague ZČDU Award for Best Actress at the 13th Festival of Czechoslovak Film (FČSF) in 1975.

Red Wine by Andrej Lettrich, who received the State Prize of Klement Gottwald for his direction, brought her much popularity on screen, and also on television where the drama was presented as a two-episode TV series. Another Lettrich film, The Lawyer, won the Best Film award at the 16th Festival of Czechoslovak Film (FČSF) in České Budějovice in 1978, and brought Vášáryová her second ZČDU Award at the 21st Karlovy Vary International Film Festival, where she also received the ÚV SZŽ Gold Plaque. She was also awarded the honorary title of Meritorious Artist.

=== 1980s ===
Fame? Never. Neither at the times of much success, I would glorify my work. And that's why I don't want to watch my movies.

— Emília Vášáryová

The 1980s were not significant years for major films, and her film career stalled when she reached her forties. However, she did appear in more than 30 television movies. The only two big-screen films she co-starred in were the fairy tale Plavčík and Vratko (1981), directed by Martin Ťapák as their third collaboration (their earlier films featured Journey to San Jago and the Day Which Does Not Die), an adaptation of a short story by Peter Solan, 1984's About Fame and Grass. The Costume designer for both productions became Vášáryová's second husband, Milan Čorba.

Because of this lull in film opportunities, she focused more on her stage career. She played the lead role in Goethe's Iphigenia in Tauris. At the end of the decade, Vášáryová lectured on theater topics at the Academy of Performing Arts in Bratislava. Barbora Bobuľová was one of her students, and she later launched an international career with much recognition, including earning the David di Donatello and Nastro d'Argento awards.

=== 1990s ===
The Ministry of Culture gave her a lifetime achievement award in 1991. Then Vášáryová launched the fourth decade of her career, concentrating again mostly on TV roles. She did at least sixteen major film roles on television in the 'nineties, including the lead female role opposite Martin Huba) in Marguerite Duras's play La Musica, for which she won a 1992 Telemuse Award for Best TV Actress. It had now been almost eight years since her last appearance on the big screen, but she returned to major films, playing the part of "Silvia" in Red Gypsy (1992), directed by Branislav Mišík. Her role in Hazard (1995) was cast by Roman Petrenko (Czech director, not to be confused with the Russian media executive) making his directing debut. She co-starred in this film based on a true story with Marek Vašut. Tomáš Krnáč cast Vášáryová in his short film, The Higher Power (1996), playing the role of a diva diagnosed with a serious illness. In theater, she earned acclaim for her performance as "the Younger Sister" in the Thomas Bernhard play Ritter, Dene, Voss, presented at the Divadlo na Zábradlí Theatre in Prague in 1996. It earned the Best Play of 1996 award.

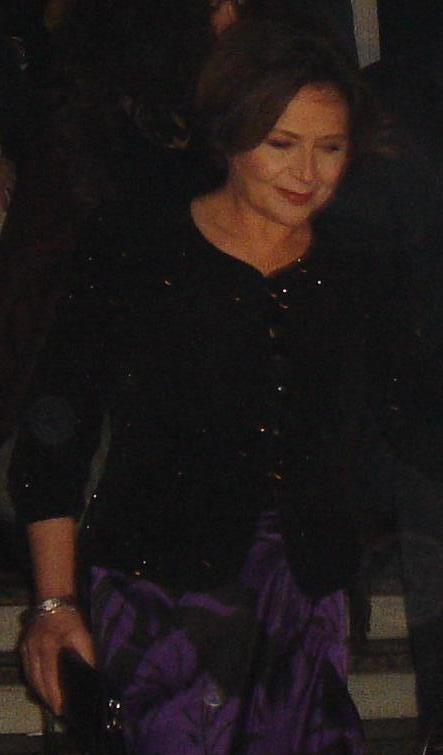
Vášáryová at the 2009 Czech Lion Awards

By the second half of the 'nineties Vášáryová was in her fifties, and successfully revived her legendary screen career. She began to engage more challenging roles. Following The Cage, she left television for almost a decade. She appeared in Martin Šulík's Orbis Pictus, and it was lauded at the International Filmfestival Mannheim-Heidelberg. Vášáryová played the role of mother. She starred in Eva Borušovičová's official debut Blue Heaven (1997), a film that was nominated at several festivals, including at the 32nd Karlovy Vary IFF, and at the independent Cinequest Film Festival held annually in San Jose, California. Return to Paradise Lost by Vojtěch Jasný was a Montréal WFF nominee. Her next picture, Cosy Dens (1999), was a comedy directed by Jan Hřebejk. Vášáryová became that young director's muse and canvas, starring for him throughout in the 2000s. In her stage work, she played the role of Agnes in the Edward Albee play, A Delicate Balance, and she received the Crystal Wing in 1999 as Best Artist in Theater/Film.

=== 2000s ===
A good role is a challenge, responsibility and duty not to betray a good author and reward him for this opportunity by work which exhausts [the] actor's abilities. Also trying to be an adequate partner, to serve the work of art which has proven its qualities.

— Emília Vášáryová

In the year 2000, for her 1999 role as the Old Woman in Ionesco's absurdist tragedy The Chairs, she received the Dosky Award, the Jozef Kroner Award. She also received the Literature Fund award. In 2001, Vášáryová won recognition from a national pool of Czech journalists who rated her as the "Actress of the Century". She acted in over ten stage roles during this period, performing as Maria Callas in Terrence McNally's Master Class, for which she received both the DOSKY and LitFond Awards in 2002. In 2009 she played the main role in Mother Courage and Her Children by Berthold Brecht and Paul Dessau, and in 2011 she was cast as Violet Weston in Tracy Letts' August: Lost in Oklahoma. For the role of Stevie Gray in Edward Albee's The Goat, or Who Is Sylvia? she received yet another DOSKY award in 2004. She also appeared in other local theatres, such as L&S Studio (Three Versions of Life in 2003, or Kingfisher in 2009) and GUnaGU Theater (Turn-away Side of the Moon in 2015). She also starred in stage productions in Prague, mostly working for the Studio DVA theater.

Her television work in the 2000s include a soap opera The Consulting Room at Pink Garden (2007), the series The Old Town's Crime Stories (2010), and a Czech TV movie, Picnic, directed by Hynek Bočan (2014).

Notes

- ^X The original show ran until 1989. A similar production, 'Television Bells', had been running in Czechoslovakia since 1985. In 1990 the Golden Croc was replaced by the "I Like" award. Beginning in 1991 the TýTý Awards were given in the Czech Republic, whereas Slovakia founded the OTO Awards in 2000.

== Awards ==
Year	Award	Category	Nominated work(s)	Result
Cinema
1975	ZČDU Award	Best Actress	Who Leaves in the Rain...	Won
1978	ZČDU Award	Best Actress	The Lawyer	Won
1978	ÚV SZŽ Gold Plaque	Best Actress	The Lawyer	Won
2004	Czech Lion	Best Actress	Up and Down	Won
2005	Cinema Award	Best Actress	Up and Down	Won
2005	SFZ Award	Best Actress	Up and Down	Won
2005	ÚSTT Award	Best Actress	Up and Down	Won
2005	LitFond Award	Best Actress	Up and Down	Yes
2008	Golden Goblet	Best Actress	Václav	Won
2008	Czech Lion	Best Supporting Actress	Nasty	Nominated^{A}
2014–2015	Sun in Net Award	Best Actress	Eva Nová	Won
Television
1968	Golden Croc	Most Popular Actress	various TV performances	Won
1992	Telemuse	Best Actress	La Musica (by M.Duras) / Mother of Jesus	Won
1995	Telemuse	Best Female Dubber	The Broken Hearts	Won
1999	Golden Loop	Best Female Dubber	Guarding Tess	Won
2001	Igric Award	Best Actress	The Cage	Won
2001	OTO Award	TV Female Actor	various TV performances	Nominated^{B}
2002	OTO Award	TV Female Actor	various TV performances	Nominated^{C}
2003	OTO Award	TV Female Actor	various TV performances	Nominated^{D}
2004	OTO Award	TV Female Actor	various TV performances	Nominated^{E}
2005	OTO Award	TV Female Actor	various TV performances	Nominated^{E}
2009	OTO Award	TV Female Actor	various TV performances	Nominated^{F}
2009	ELSA Award	Best Actress	The Archive	Won
2010	OTO Award	TV Female Actor – Drama	various TV performances	Won
2011	OTO Award	TV Female Actor – Drama	various TV performances	Nominated
Stage
1967	Janko Borodáč Award	Best Actress	The Dancing Master (by Lope de Vega); A Midsummer Night's Dream	Won
1983	Andrej Bagar Award	Best Actress	Iphigenia in Tauris	Won
1996	Alfréd Radok Award	Best Actress	Ritter, Dene, Voss	Won
1996	LitFond Award	Theater Act	The Cherry Orchard	Won
1998	Crystal Wing	Best Act – Theater/Film	A Delicate Balance	Won
2000	DOSKY Award	Best Actress	The Chairs	Won
2000	Jozef Kroner Award	Best Actress	The Chairs	Won
2000	LitFond Award	Best Actress	The Chairs	Won
2002	LitFond Award	Best Actress	Master Class	Won
2002	DOSKY Award	Best Actress	Master Class	Won
2003	Tatra Banka Award	Best Performance	Unknown	Won
2004	DOSKY Award	Best Actress	The Goat, or Who Is Sylvia?	Won
2006	Kobanadi Award	Best Actress	Joseph and Marie (by Peter Turrini)	Won
2006	To Najlepšie z Humoru Festival	Audience Choice	The Last Cigar (by B.Ahlfors)	Won

Notes

- ^{A} Won by Lenka Termerová for her role of Mother in Děti noci, directed by Michaela Pavlátová.
- ^{B} Won by Zdena Studenková. Vášáryová was ranked third, following Anna Šišková.
- ^{C} Won by Zdena Studenková. Vášáryová was ranked third, following Kamila Magálová.
- ^{D} Won by Zdena Studenková. Vášáryová was ranked second, followed by Kamila Magálová.
- ^{E} Won by Zdena Studenková. Vášáryová was ranked third, following Magda Paveleková.
- ^{F} Won by Petra Polnišová. Vášáryová was ranked third, following Gabriela Dzuríková.

Lifetime honors and other achievements
Year	Award/Category	Nominated work	Result
1970	For Outstanding Work	Herself	Honored
1978	Meritorious Artist	Herself	Honored
1991	Slovak Ministry of Culture Prize	Herself	Honored
2001	Actress of the Century (by the Slovak Journalists Syndicate)	Herself	Honored
2001	Actor's Mission Award	Herself	Honored
2002	Order of Ľudovít Štúr 1st Class (State decoration)	Herself	Honored
2003	Karel Čapek Award 2002	Herself	Honored
2003	Václav Havel Prize – The Medal of Merit	Herself	Honored
2005	Pavol Strauss Award (by UKF Nitra)	Herself	Honored
2007	LitFond Award	Herself	Honored
2008	OTO Award – Hall of Fame	Herself	Honored
2009	Artis Bohemiae Amicis (by Czech Ministry of Culture)	Herself	Honored
2010	Doctor Artis Dramaticae Honoris Causa (by JAMU)	Herself	Honored
2012	Bratislavian Blueberry (by Honorary Council of J.Satinský)	Herself	Honored
2016	The Film Walk of Fame (by IFF Bratislava)	Herself	Honored
