= Adela Vinczeová =

Slovak radio and television presenter (born 1980)

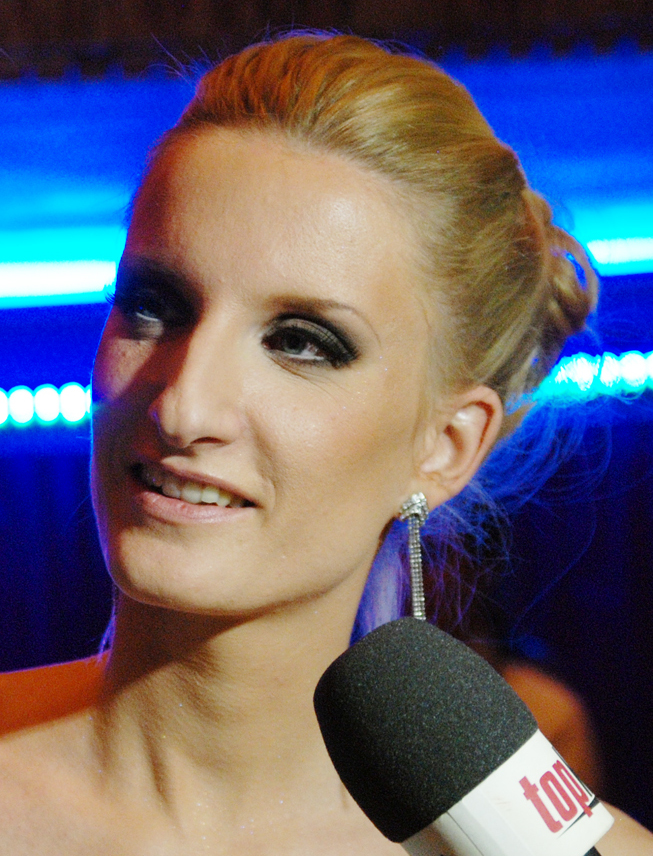
- Vinczeová in 2011
- Born: 12 October 1980 (age 45); Bratislava, Czechoslovakia now Slovakia
- Occupation: TV presenter
- Years active: 1996-present
- Children: 2

Adela Vinczeová (née Banášová; born 12 October 1980) is a Slovak radio and television presenter. She has presented television shows such as Česko Slovenská SuperStar season 1, the Anděl Awards, and the Czech Lion Awards.

== Biography ==
Vinczeová is the daughter of Slovak writer, agent of communist secret service (known as agent Lotos) and politician Jozef Banáš. She grew up in Eastern Germany together with her sister Maria. Living abroad helped her gain various language skills and experiences, but Vinczeová has been dedicated to her homeland, Slovakia. In 2015, Banášová won her ninth title at the OTO Awards, making her the most successful person in the ceremony's history.
