= Partička =

- Genre: Improvisational comedy
- Created by: Daniel Dangl
- Based on: Whose Line Is It Anyway?
- Starring: Juraj Kemka; Lukáš Latinák; Marián Miezga; Róbert Jakab; Roman Pomajbo; Petra Polnišová
- Country of origin: Slovakia
- Original language: Slovak
- No. of seasons: 4
- No. of episodes: 107

Production
- Producers: Vladimír Burianek; Zuzana Balkóová
- Running time: 30 minutes

Original release
- Network: Markíza
- Release: 4 October 2009 – 31 December 2012

Partička was a Slovak improvisational comedy show strongly inspired by Whose Line Is It Anyway?, later brought to the Czech Republic. The Slovak edition started in 2009. Although it saw a big success with the younger generation of viewers, its ratings were never high enough for the commercial television Markíza, which broadcast the show. After several shifts with its timeslot (starting on Monday nights – moved to Saturday nights) the show ended after its fourth season on 31 December 2012. Several Slovak actors have appeared on the show including Juraj Kemka, Lukáš Latinák and Petra Polnišová.

The show was later brought to the Czech television Prima, where its success slowly grew to a very popular show. Production made several tours across the Czech Republic and organized the summer festival Partička na Vzduchu starring Slovak actors as well. After cancellation on the television channel Prima, production moved to the internet television channel Stream.cz as iPartička and later to Barrandov television as La Parta, but neither was as successful as the original Slovak Partička. The Czech edition later ended on May 27, 2013.

Actors in Slovakian version:

- Daniel Dangl (host)
- Marián Čurko (music effects)
- Juraj Kemka
- Lukáš Latinák
- Marián Miezga
- Róbert Jakab
- Roman Pomajbo
- Petra Polnišová

Many guest appearances

Actors in Czech version:

- Daniel Dangl (host)
- Marián Čurko (music effects)
- Michal Suchánek
- Richard Genzer
- Ondřej Sokol
- Igor Chmela

Guests:

- Lucie Bílá
- Vojtěch Dyk
- Nightwork
- Tatiana Vilhelmová
- Petr Vacek
- Miloš Malý
- Paulina Nakashole
