= OTO Awards =

Slovak popular culture awards show

- Awarded for: Popular culture on TV
- Country: Slovakia
- Presented by: Art Production Agency
- First award: February 3, 2001
- Website: otoanketa.sk

Osobnosť televíznej obrazovky (Television Screen Personality), more commonly abbreviated as OTO, was a Slovak awards show recognizing the public figures and the work of popular culture in the country. Established by Art Production Agency (APA) in 2000, the television poll-based awards were voted on by the general viewing audiences. The annual ceremonies of the accolades were screened live by the national television network RTVS, usually in March for the previous calendar year.

The categories awarded regularly, included Program, Actor, Actress, Male and Female Singer, as well two special awards; Hall of Fame and Absolute OTO.

The announcement of awards' discontinuation was announced in 2022, following negative controversies in previous years, pandemic delays, declining popularity and high production costs.

== Categories ==
=== Latest awards ===
Hosts

- Host • Until 2013 Entertainer awarded instead.
- News Host • In 2001–2003 a joint-category held only, including presenters in broadcast journalism.
- Sports Host • From 2003 to 2011 a common category held only, including presenters in sportscasting.

Other presenters

- Journalist • In 2001–2003 a joint-category held only, including presenters in news coverage.
- News Reporter • Established in 2012.
- Sports Commentator • Held since 2001. From 2003 to 2011 a common category held only, including hosting.

Actors

- Actor^{┼} • In 2010–2011 split into genres, drama/comedy.
- Actress^{┼} • In 2010–2011 split into genres, drama/comedy.

Other performers

- Male Singer^{┼}
- Female Singer^{┼}
- Band • Established in 2013.

TV programming

- Program^{┼} • Includes various formats regardless of a genre, such as reality TV, special, sitcom or else.
- Show • Held since 2005.
- Series • Held since 2008, split into genres in 2009.

=== Special awards ===
- Absolute OTO^{┼} • The overall winner with the highest number of votes per ceremony.
- Hall of Fame^{┼} • Honors individuals with outstanding contributions to the medium, mainly in the acting field.
- Plus 7 dní Award • A journalistic award formerly given by TV listings-devoted weekly EuroTelevízia (2003–2006), later by Život magazine (2007–2015).

=== Retired awards ===
Note

^{┼} denotes a category awarded regularly since.

== Ceremonies ==
The listed years are of television release, annual ceremonies are held the following year.

- 1st OTO Awards (2000)
- 2nd OTO Awards (2001)
- 3rd OTO Awards (2002)
- 4th OTO Awards (2003)
- 5th OTO Awards (2004)
- 6th OTO Awards (2005)
- 7th OTO Awards (2006)
- 8th OTO Awards (2007)
- 9th OTO Awards (2008)
- 10th OTO Awards (2009)
- 11th OTO Awards (2010)
- 12th OTO Awards (2011)
- 13th OTO Awards (2012)
- 14th OTO Awards (2013)
- 15th OTO Awards (2014)
- 16th OTO Awards (2015)
- 17th OTO Awards (2016)
- 18th OTO Awards (2017)
- 19th OTO Awards (2018)
- 20th OTO Awards (2019)

== Superlatives ==
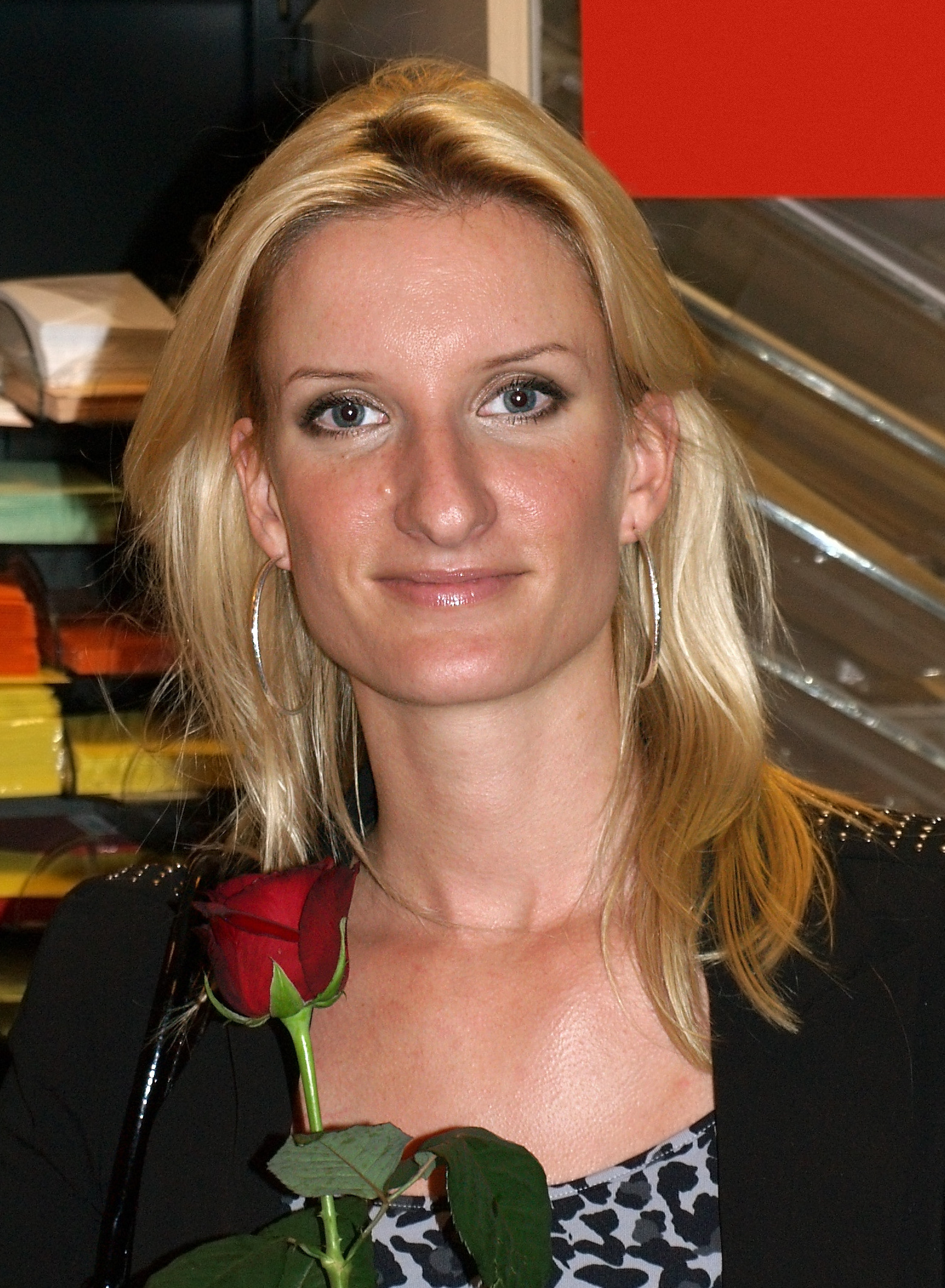
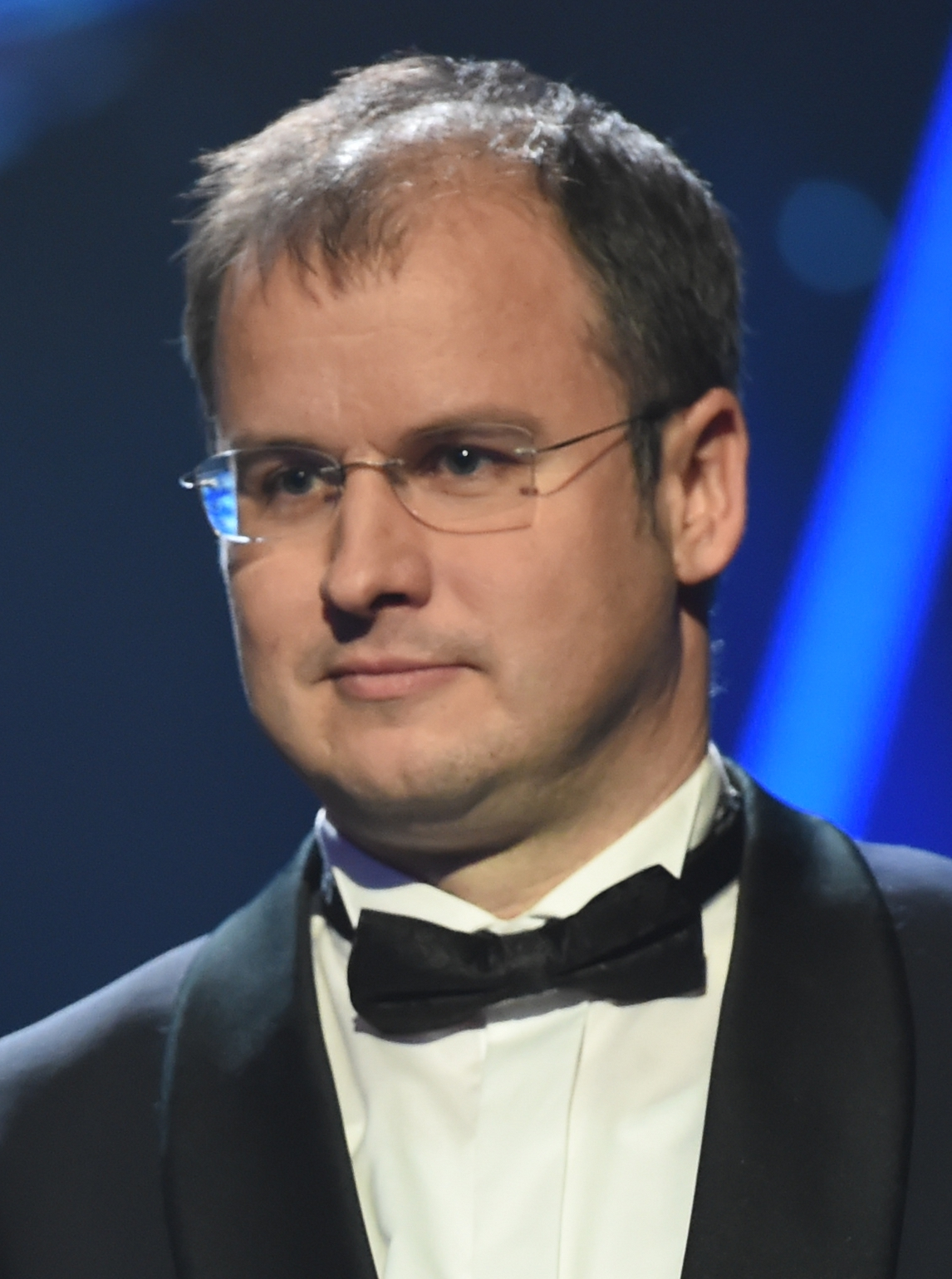
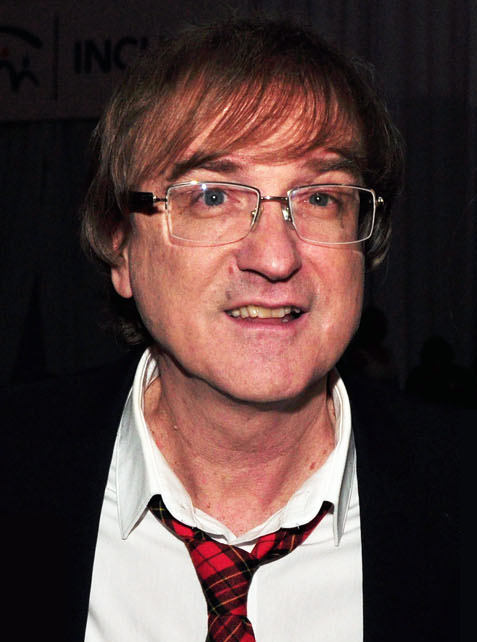
Left to right: Adela Vinczeová • Marcel Merčiak • Miroslav Žbirka

With ten awards having received in main categories, Adela Vinczeová is the most successful participant in the so far history of the OTO Awards poll, making her the most voted Entertainer and Host in general. She is followed by Marcel Merčiak who has accumulated nine as trophies as Sports Commentator, while Miroslav Žbirka and Patrik Herman have each scored seven wins, these as the most favorite Male Singer and TV Journalist, respectively. Herman also holds the record for the highest number of consecutive wins per category.

Including special achievements, Vinczeová leads with fifteen wins in total, while Merčiak with twelve. Besides, he is the only winner having scored at least in two categories per year, both the special (2012) and regular (2015–2017). The third participant with the highest number of OTO awards in general, is Actress Zdena Studenková with eight wins.

Within multiple nominees, Žbirka himself remains the most successful to date, having earned sixteen nominations in a row to his credit, all made since the second season of the show. His runners-up are Sportscaster Lenka Čviriková with fifteen nominations, and Herman and Merčiak; the latters with fourteen nominating bids.

== Reception ==
=== TV ratings ===
During the first decade, the show attracted in average over 700,000 viewers per ceremony, reaching its peak with a total audience of more than 855,00 viewers for the 7th season. Subsequently held ceremonies marked the second highest numbers for the title as whole. The 9th and 10th season were watched by 731,000 and 778,000 people respectively, with the latter being televised on two STV sister's channels at the same time; Jednotka (STV 1) and Trojka (STV 3).

Since the 2010s, the show format gains considerably less — roughly half a million audiences each year —, yet still making it the most watched television program within prime time in the region. The 12th season of the TV poll, or rather the only aired on a Friday instead, produced also the lowest ratings ever for the program; only 464,000 viewers that year.

Chronological list of all seasons with available rankings and audience share figures
Season	Original airing	Time (CET)	Network (Channel)	Ranking		Viewership				
Season	Original airing	Time (CET)	Network (Channel)	Day	Week	Share (12–54)	Viewers	Share (12+)	Viewers	Ref
1st (2000)	February 3, 2001	—N/a	STV: 1	—N/a	—N/a	—N/a	—N/a	—N/a	—N/a	—
2nd (2001)	February 2, 2002	—N/a	STV: 1	—N/a	—N/a	—N/a	—N/a	—N/a	—N/a	—
3rd (2002)	February 1, 2003	—N/a	STV: 1	—N/a	—N/a	—N/a	—N/a	—N/a	—N/a	—
4th (2003)	January 31, 2004	—N/a	JOJ	—N/a	—N/a	—N/a	—N/a	—N/a	—N/a	—
5th (2004)	February 9, 2005	—N/a	STV: 1	No. 1	No. 7	—N/a	—N/a	38.4%	680,000	
6th (2005)	February 8, 2006	—N/a	STV: 1	No. 1	—N/a	—N/a	—N/a	34.5%	611,000	
7th (2006)	March 14, 2007	08.15 pm	STV: 1	No. 1	—N/a	—N/a	—N/a	45.9%	855,000	
8th (2007)	March 12, 2008	08.15 pm	STV: 1	No. 1	No. 9	—N/a	—N/a	41.2%	709,000	
9th (2008)	March 11, 2009	08.15 pm	STV: 1	No. 1	—N/a	39.8%	421,000	42.3%	731,000	
10th (2009)	March 13, 2010	08.15 pm	STV: 1	No. 1	—N/a	32.0%	394,000	37.1%	734,000	
10th (2009)	March 13, 2010	08.15 pm	STV 3	No. 1	—N/a	32.0%	394,000	+2.2%	+44,000	
11th (2010)	March 12, 2011	08.15 pm	RTVS: 1	—N/a	—N/a	20.3%	248,000	27.9%	553,000	
12th (2011)	March 9, 2012	08.15 pm	RTVS: 1	No. 2	—N/a	17.3%	216,000	22.4%	464,000	
13th (2012)	March 16, 2013	08.15 pm	RTVS: 1	No. 1	—N/a	22.3%	271,000	28.6%	587,000	
14th (2013)	March 8, 2014	08.20 pm	RTVS: 1	No. 1	—N/a	23.1%	269,000	28.6%	551,000	
15th (2014)	March 14, 2015	08.22 pm	RTVS: 1	No. 1	—N/a	26.6%	308,000	30.6%	601,000	
16th (2015)	March 12, 2016	08.25 pm	RTVS: 1	No. 1	—N/a	30.2%	322,000	36.2%	675,000	
17th (2016)	March 11, 2017	08.25 pm	RTVS: 1	No. 1	—N/a	30.0%	356,000	32.7%	669,000	
18th (2017)	March 17, 2018	08.30 pm	RTVS: 1	No. 1	—N/a	28.7%	330,000	31.0%	629,000	
Legend	Saturday Wednesday Friday		The latest two seasons (2015—2016) include the delayed viewership with the numbers slightly increased.						Estimated	

== See also ==
- People's Choice Awards
