= Jozef Pročko =

Slovak comedian and politician

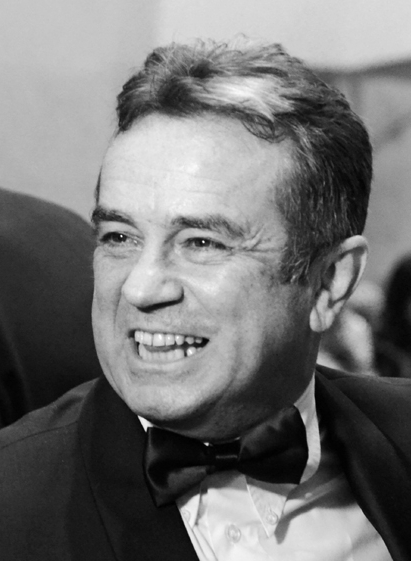
- Pročko in 2015

Member of the National Council
- Incumbent
- Assumed office 12 May 2020

Personal details
- Born: 13 March 1965 (age 61) Halič, Czechoslovakia
- Party: Ordinary People and Independent Personalities
- Children: 2
- Education: Comenius University; Academy of Performing Arts in Bratislava

Jozef Pročko (born 13 March 1965) is a Slovak comedian and politician. He has served as a Member of the National Council of Slovakia since 2020.

== Early life ==
Pročko was born in Halič on 13 March 1965. He studied physical education at the Comenius University and acting at the Academy of Performing Arts in Bratislava, graduating in 1994.

== Career ==
Pročko was employed by various TV Channels and the New Scene theatre from 1994 until 1996. He was the first host of Koleso Štastia, the Slovak adaptation of Wheel of Fortune. Pročko has been an independent artist since 1996, performing and hosting a variety of comedy shows. He is a four-time winner of the OTO Awards in the entertainer category.

Pročko has operated a cultural centre Zbrojnica in Halič since 2003. He also runs a foundation "Jožo Pročko for Children" which organizes summer camps for children from disadvantaged backgrounds and supports victims of domestic abuse. Pročko has been a Member of the National Council since 2020, being elected on OĽANO list.

== Personal life ==
Pročko is married and has two children. He lives in Bratislava.
