= TV JOJ =

Slovak television channel

- Country: Slovakia
- Headquarters: Bratislava, Slovakia

Programming
- Picture format: 1080i HDTV (downscaled to 576i for the SD feed)

Ownership
- Owner: JOJ Group (J&T Enterprises)
- Sister channels: JOJ Plus; JOJ Krimi; JOJ Cinema; Jojko; JOJ Šport; JOJ Šport 2 JOJ 24; JOJ Svet; JOJ Family

History
- Launched: 2 March 2002; 24 years ago
- Founder: Vladimír Železný
- Former names: TV Global (2000–2002)

Links
- Website: www.joj.sk

Availability

Terrestrial
- Digital terrestrial television: MUX 2 (FTA) (SD); MUX 4 (Pay) (HD)

Streaming media
- JOJ.sk: Watch live (Slovak only)

TV JOJ is a Slovak private television channel owned by J&T Enterprises and launched in March 2002. The channel screens serial dramas and TV shows. The name JOJ is derived from a Slovak interjection, comparable to oh là là.

== History ==
It was launched on 2 March 2002 as a successor of the network TV Global, which had been broadcasting since March 2000. The station's first slogan was "Nuda na Slovensku skončila," which translates to "Boredom in Slovakia has finished." TV JOJ was built by former head of the Czech channel TV Nova, Vladimír Železný, when he was at war with TV Nova's U.S. investor Central European Media Enterprises (CME). Through Joj, Železný wanted to shake the dominance of CME's station in Slovakia, TV Markíza, which was enjoying almost 50 percent of the country's nationwide audience. When TV JOJ first started, it was unpopular. The station was beaten by TV Nova, a more popular station.

In 2004, when CME bought back TV Nova, the Americans had to divest from TV Joj as Slovak legislation forbids a company to own two nationwide TV stations. The Czechs sold TV Joj back to Grafobal. As of 2004, TV Joj somewhat improved its audience and increased its reach from 65 percent of the country to 80 percent in 2005. Behind Grafobal is the Slovak businessman Ivan Kmotrík. His empire encompasses the country's largest newspaper distributor and retailer Mediaprint & Kapa Pressegrosso, four large printing houses and the advertising agency EURO RSCG Artmedia, among others.

J&T Media Enterprises, a J&T vehicle, bought Mac TV, the holder of the license for TV Joj, from Grafobal Group in January 2007. At the same time, from J&T Finance Group, Grafobal Group received the all-news TV station TA3, becoming the full owner of CEN, the company operating TA3.

TV JOJ has toughened up their primetime and their average weekly audience share has increased to 21,8 % as of July 2, 2012. Markíza's weekly audience share is 26,7 % nowadays. TV Markíza has recorded a massive decrease of audience share. Back to 2007 they had average weekly audience share up to 39,7%.

In October 2025, TV JOJ announced that it and all of its sister channels will cease free-to-air distribution from 1 January 2026, becoming pay-TV channels. Terrestrial television coverage will continue, but as encrypted channels on the Plustelka platform.

== Notable television presenters ==
- Dušan Ambróš (2022–present)
- Juraj Bača (2008)
- Erika Barkolová (2007–present)
- Lucia Barmošová (2005–present)
- Andrej Bičan (2003–2008)
- Pavel Bruchala (2014)
- Monika Bruteničová (2006–2021)
- Katarína Brychtová (2002–2004)
- Štefan Bučko (2002–2007)
- Bruno Ciberej (2009–present)
- Dušan Cinkota (2006)
- Dana Čapkovičová (2010–present)
- Marián Čekovský (2018–2019)
- Peter Čvirik (2021–present)
- Lenka Čviriková Hriadelová (2002–present)
- Matej Cifra (2005–2006, 2008–2010, 2013)
- Daniel Dangl (2014)
- Martin Dejdar (2018–2019)
- Michal Dočolomanský (2004)
- Michal Farkašovský (2008–present)
- Marcel Forgáč (2015–present)
- Ján Gallovič (2004)
- Juraj Hajdin (2004–present)
- Zuzana Hajdu (2002–2006)
- Dárius Haraksin (2004–present)
- Michal Hazlinger (2008–present)
- Peter Hollý (2002–2013)
- Michal Hudák (2002–present)
- Ivan Janda (2008–present)
- Miriam Jarošová (2008–present)
- Katarína Jesenská (2016–present)
- Lenka Ježová (2022–present)
- Peter Jurčovič (2008–present)
- Slavomír Jurko (2021–present)
- Thomas Kamenar (2013–present)
- Ondrej Kandráč (2016–present)
- Adriana Kmotríková (2002–2020)
- Simona Krainová (2007)
- Jan Kraus (2006, 2010)
- Iveta Krupová (2010–present)
- Milan Kňažko (2003–2007)
- Peter Kočiš (2005–2008)
- Mário "Kuly" Kollár (2019–present)
- Stanislava Kováčik (2008–present)
- Jozef Kuriľák (2002–2004, 2018–present)
- Radovan Ležovič (2004–present)
- Janko Kroner (2003–2007)
- Ján Mečiar (2008–present)
- Pavol Michalka (2008–present)
- Soňa Müllerová (2005–2010)
- Martin Nikodým (2014–2015)
- Bibiana Ondrejková (2018–present)
- Branislav Ondruš (2002–2008)
- Aneta Parišková (2007–present)
- Stanislava Pavolová (2005–present)
- Andrea Pállfy Belányiová (2011–present)
- Petra Polnišová (2007)
- Jakub Prachař (2010–present)
- Jozef Pročko (2006–2007)
- Martin Rausch (2010–2013, 2020–present)
- Viliam Rozboril (2014–present)
- Richard Rybníček (2002–2003)
- Ľuboš Sarnovský (2002–present)
- Štefan Skrúcaný (2017–present)
- Alexander Štefuca (2004)
- Alfonz Šuran (2002–2003)
- Klaudia Suchomel Guzová (2002–2018)
- Dana Španková Roháčová (2002–2004)
- Adela Vinczeová (2009, 2012)
- Vladimír Voštinár (2002–present)
- Hana Zavřelová Gallová (2002–present)
- Milan Zimnýkoval (2012–present)
