= Magda Paveleková =

Slovak actress

- Born: 7 June 1931; Levice, Czechoslovakia
- Died: 20 July 2015 (aged 84); Dunajská Lužná, Slovakia
- Occupation: Actress
- Years active: 1963–2008

Magda Paveleková (7 June 1931 – 20 July 2015) was a Slovak actress. She acted mainly on the stage, performing with the Slovak National Theatre for more than 40 years. She also played parts in 12 films. Paveleková won the Hall of Fame OTO Award for 2012. She won the Kvet Tálie prize in 2007.
