= Petra Brocková =

Slovak actress and stand-up comedian (born 1976)

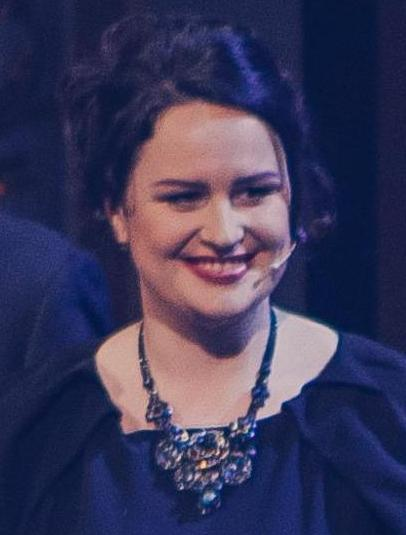
- Brocková in 2014
- Born: 24 February 1976 (age 50); Bratislava, Czechoslovakia
- Occupation: Actress
- Years active: 2004–present
- Children: 2

Petra Brocková (née Polnišová; born 24 February 1976) is a Slovak actress and stand-up comedian.

== Biography ==
Brocková studied puppetry at the Academy of Performing Arts in Bratislava. She worked at Teatro Laboratorio Mangiafuoco in Milan, Italy, for two years. In Slovakia, Brocková became a member of the theaters: GUnaGU in Bratislava, L+S, Nová scéna, and Aréna. She played the role of Milada Bučičová from Muzika in 2007.

== Awards ==
Year	Nominated work	Award	Category	Result
2006	Herself	OTO Awards	Humorist	Nominated
2007	Muzika (as Milada Bučičová)	Sun in a Net Awards	Best Actress in a Supporting Role	Nominated
2007	Herself	OTO Awards	Humorist	Won
2007	Herself	OTO Awards	Absolute OTO	Won
2009	Herself	OTO Awards	TV Female Actor	Won
2010	Herself	OTO Awards	TV Female Actor – Comedy	Won
2011	Herself	OTO Awards	TV Female Actor – Comedy	Won
2011	Herself	OTO Awards	Absolute Winner	Won
2012	Herself	OTO Awards	TV Female Actor	Nominated
2014	Herself	OTO Awards	TV Female Actor	Nominated
2015	Herself	OTO Awards	TV Female Actor	Nominated
