= Markíza =

Slovak television channel

- Logo used since 2022
- Country: Slovakia
- Transmitters: cable, satellite, IPTV, DVB-T
- Headquarters: Záhorská Bystrica, Bratislava

Programming
- Language: Slovak
- Picture format: 1080i HDTV

Ownership
- Owner: Markíza – Slovakia, spol. s r.o. (CME, owned by PPF Group)
- Sister channels: Markíza Doma; Markíza Dajto; Markíza KRIMI; Markíza Klasik; Markíza International

History
- Launched: 31 August 1996; 30 years ago
- Founder: Pavol Rusko

Links
- Website: markiza.sk tnlive.sk

Availability

Terrestrial
- DVB-T: MUX 4 (HD) (Pay)

Streaming media
- Archív Markíza: Watch live (Slovak only)
- Voyo: Voyo

Markíza (also known as Televízia Markíza) is a Slovak television channel launched on August 31, 1996. The channel was founded by a later politician Pavol Rusko, and is now part of the Central European Media Enterprises (CME). It also operates television channels Doma (since 2009), Dajto (since 2012), Markíza International (since 2016), Markíza KRIMI (since 2022), and Markíza Klasik (since 2024). In 2020, CME was bought out by Peter Kellner's investment group PPF. PPF is therefore the new owner of TV Markíza.

In addition to its news and local programs, TV Markíza has broadcast rights to a variety of popular American and European films and series.

TV Markíza's programming is also available through the Slovak streaming service Voyo, mobile applications.

The General Director of CME's operations in Slovakia is Peter Gažík.

== Etymology ==
The name of the channel, Markíza (Marquise), in the words of its director in 2008, evoked "freshness, glamour, prestige", which was seen as something "out of the ordinary".

== History ==
"Markiza is a daughter of the HZDS", said Emília Boldišová, who led the license drive, which refused to give a license to Pavol Rusko because he hid the co-owner from abroad, Sylvia Volzová. The committee in December 1994 issued a license to Markíza – Slovakia, Blatné, spol. s. r. o. which was awarded on 7 August 1995. According to Boldišová, thanks to the then president of the Slovak National Council Ivan Gašparovič, his assistant Ľuboš Jurík and Oľga Keltošová.

== CME Content Academy ==
In 2022, Markíza and TV Nova, in cooperation with The Television Institute Brno, launched CME Content Academy. The scholarship program is funded by Central European Media Enterprises, to which both TV Nova and Markíza belong. The Academy's two-year course is designed to provide participants with a grounding across various film-making disciplines, enabling students to become TV professionals.

The practice is divided according to the production scheme of TV Nova and Markíza and takes place in Brno, Prague, and Bratislava.
