= OTO Award for TV Host – Sports =

Media award in Slovakia

OTO Award
TV Host – Sports

Currently held by
Marcel Merčiak

First awarded | Last awarded
2000 | Present

OTO Award for TV Host – Sports has been awarded since the first edition of the accolades, established by Art Production Agency (APA) in Slovakia in 2000. Each year, the award has been presented to the most recognized television presenters of the past year in the sports program, with the ceremony permitted live by the national television network STV.

== Winners and nominees ==
=== 2000s ===
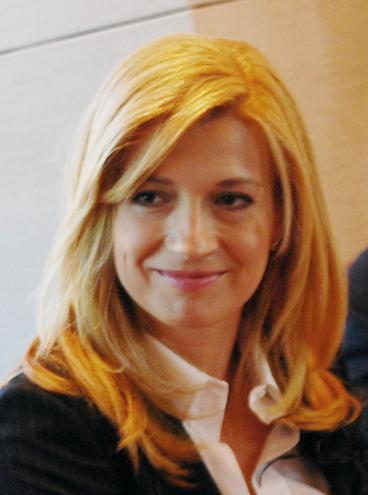
Jarmila Lajčáková has been awarded among TV Sports Hosts as the initial winner.

Year	Recipient	Nominees
2000	★ Jarmila Lajčáková^{┼†} (née Hargašová)	Miroslav Michalech; Stanislav Ščepán
2001	Not awarded	
2002	Not awarded	
2003	Held only in joint-category	
2004	Held only in joint-category	
2005	Held only in joint-category	
2006	Held only in joint-category	
2007	Held only in joint-category	
2008	Held only in joint-category	
2009	Held only in joint-category	

=== 2010s ===
Year	Recipient	Nominees
2010	Held only in joint-category	
2011	Held only in joint-category	
2012	★ Lenka Čviriková (née Hriadelová)	Marcel Merčiak^{†Ž}; Peter Varinský
2013	★ Peter Varinský (2 consecutive wins)	Marcel Merčiak^{†Ž}; Lenka Čviriková
2014	★ Peter Varinský (2 consecutive wins)	Marcel Merčiak^{†Ž}; Lenka Čviriková
2015	★ Marcel Merčiak (2 consecutive wins)	Lenka Čviriková; Peter Varinský
2016	★ Marcel Merčiak (2 consecutive wins)	Lenka Čviriková; Peter Varinský

== Superlatives ==
=== Multiple winners ===
2 awards

- Peter Varinský
- Marcel Merčiak^{ЮŽ}

=== Multiple nominees ===
5 nominations

- Lenka Čviriková
- Marcel Merčiak^{†Ž}
- Peter Varinský

Notes

^{┼} Denotes also a winner in two or more of the main categories.
^{Ю} Denotes also or a winner of the Absolute OTO category.
^{Ž} Denotes also or a winner of the Život Award.
