= OTO Award for TV Host – News =

Awards

OTO Award
TV Host – News

Currently held by
Adriana Kmotríková

First awarded | Last awarded
2000 | Present

OTO Award for TV Host – News has been awarded since the first edition of the accolades, established by Art Production Agency (APA) in Slovakia in 2000. Each year, the award has been presented to the most recognized television hosts in the news program of the past year with the ceremony permitted live by the national television network STV.

== Winners and nominees ==
=== 2000s ===
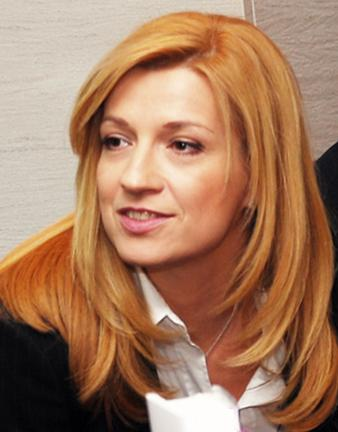
Jarmila Lajčáková is one of the few nominees having won in three individual categories, including the TV News Host.

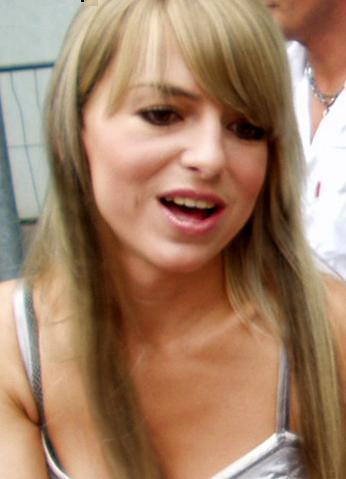
Zlatica Puškárová as a multi TV Journalist-winner, she has received three nominations.

| Year | Recipient | Nominees |
|---|---|---|
| 2000 | ★ Aneta Parišková | Ľubomír Karásek; Jana Majeská |
| 2001 | Held only within TV News and Journalism | |
| 2002 | Held only within TV News and Journalism | |
| 2003 | Held only within TV News and Journalism | |
| 2004 | ★ Aneta Parišková (2 consecutive wins) | Marianna Ďurianová; Andrea Pálffyová (née Belányiová) |
| 2005 | ★ Aneta Parišková (2 consecutive wins) | Marianna Ďurianová; Jana Majeská |
| 2006 | ★ Martina Šimkovičová (née Bartošíková) | Rastislav Žitný; Jarmila Lajčáková (née Hargašová) |
| 2007 | ★ Rastislav Žitný | Zlatica Švajdová (née Puškárová); Patrik Švajda |
| 2008 | ★ Jarmila Lajčáková | Zlatica Švajdová (née Puškárová); Patrik Švajda |
| 2009 | ★ Lucia Barmošová (5 consecutive wins) | Jarmila Lajčáková; Zlatica Švajdová |

=== 2010s ===
| Year | Recipient | Nominees |
|---|---|---|
| 2010 | (See above) | Jarmila Lajčáková; Miriam Kalisová |
| 2011 | (See above) | Andrea Pálffyová; Miriam Kalisová |
| 2012 | (See above) | Ján Mečiar; Miriam Kalisová |
| 2013 | (See above) | Ľubomír Bajaník; Ján Mečiar |
| 2014 | ★ Ján Mečiar | Ľubomír Bajaník; Lucia Barmošová |
| 2015 | ★ Adriana Kmotríková (2 consecutive wins) | Ľubomír Bajaník; Mária Chreneková (née Pietrová) |
| 2016 | ★ Adriana Kmotríková (2 consecutive wins) | Ľubomír Bajaník; Mária Chreneková (née Pietrová) |

== Superlatives ==
=== Multiple winners ===
5 awards

- Lucia Barmošová

3 awards

- Aneta Parišková

2 awards

- Adriana Kmotríková

=== Multiple nominees ===
6 nominations

- Lucia Barmošová

5 nominations

- Aneta Parišková

4 nominations

- Jarmila Lajčáková^{┼Ю}
  (née Hargašová)
- Ľubomír Bajaník

3 nominations

- Aneta Parišková
- Zlatica Švajdová^{≠}
  (née Puškárová)
- Miriam Kalisová
- Ján Mečiar

2 nominations

- Jana Majeská^{Ŧ}
- Marianna Ďurianová
- Patrik Švajda
- Rastislav Žitný
- Andrea Pálffyová
  (née Belányiová)
- Adriana Kmotríková
- Mária Chreneková (née Pietrová)

Notes

^{┼} Denotes also a winner in two or more of the main categories.
^{Ю} Denotes also a winner of the Absolute OTO category.
^{≠} Denotes a winner of the TV Journalism category.
^{Ŧ} Denotes a winner of the TV News and Journalism category.
