= OTO Award for TV Journalism =

OTO Award
TV Journalism

Currently held by
Patrik Herman

First awarded | Last awarded
2000 | Present

OTO Award for TV Journalism has been awarded since the first edition of the accolades, established by Art Production Agency (APA) in Slovakia in 2000. Each year, the award has been presented to the most recognized television journalists of the past year with the ceremony permitted live by the national television network STV.

== Winners and nominees ==
=== 2000s ===
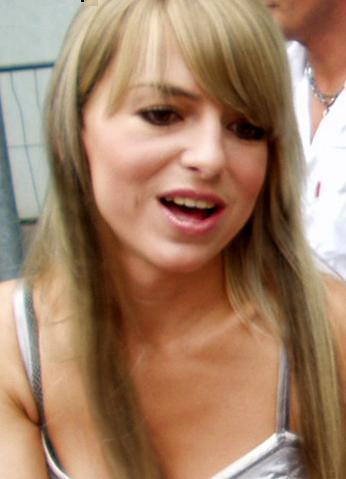
Patrik Herman and Zlatica Švajdová (pictured) have been the most awarded journalists.

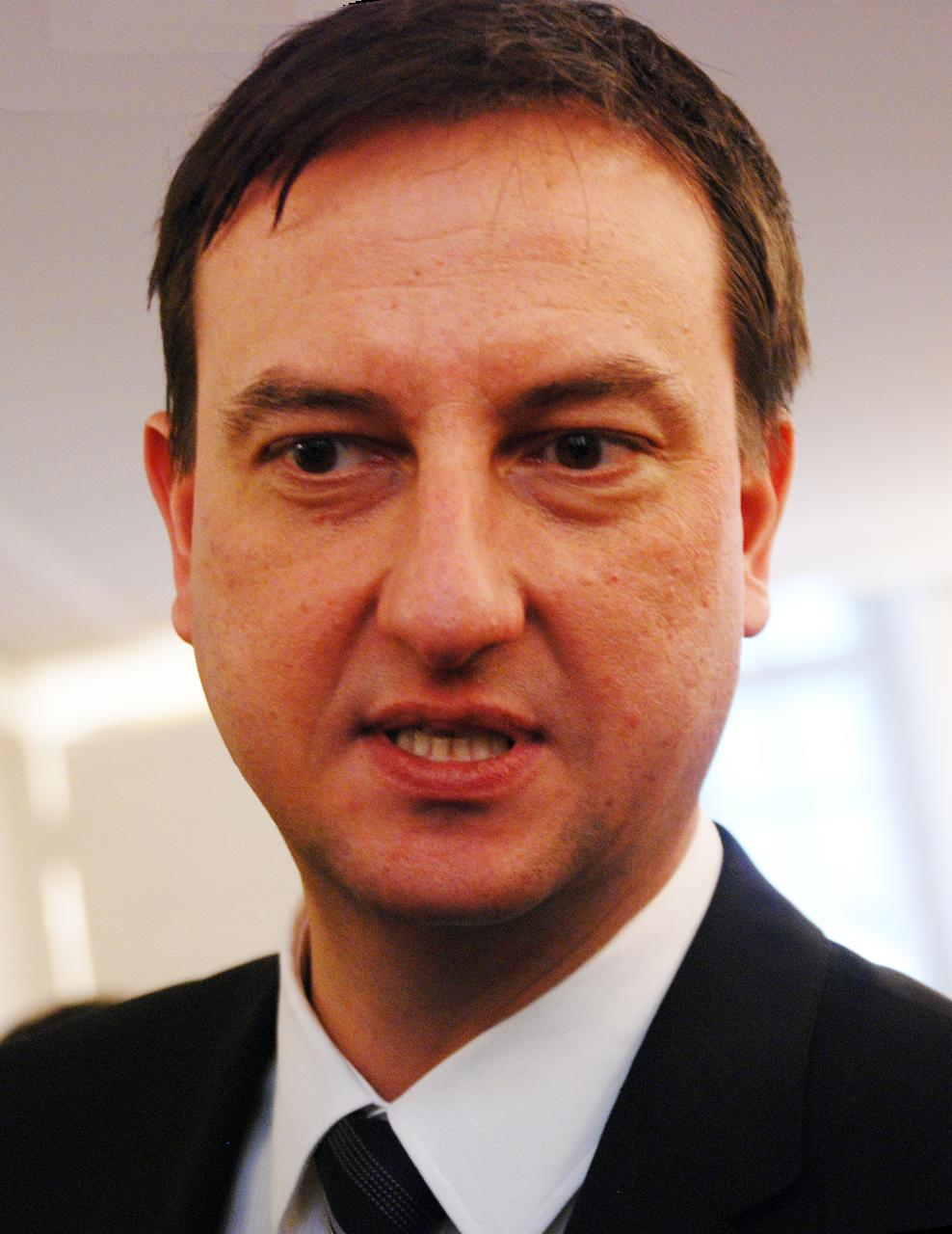
Though Daniel Krajcer has scored only win, he earlier scooped other two trophies within a joint OTO category.

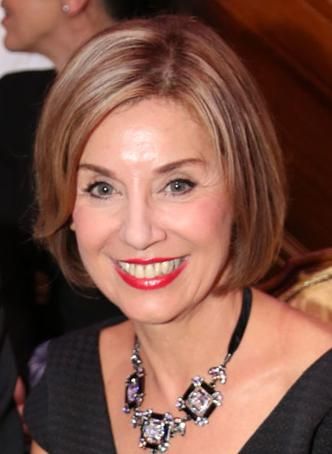
Alena Heribanová, a triple nominee for TV Announcers, later one-time nominee amongst the TV Journalists.

Year	Recipient	Nominees
2000	★ Eva Černá	Patrik Herman; Daniel Krajcer
2001	Held only within TV News and Journalism	
2002	Held only within TV News and Journalism	
2003	Held only within TV News and Journalism	
2004	★ Daniel Krajcer	Patrik Herman; Zlatica Švajdová
2005	★ Zlatica Švajdová (née Puškárová) (5 consecutive wins)	Patrik Herman; Daniel Krajcer
2006	★ Zlatica Švajdová (née Puškárová) (5 consecutive wins)	Patrik Herman; Daniel Krajcer
2007	★ Zlatica Švajdová (née Puškárová) (5 consecutive wins)	Daniel Krajcer; Pavol Fejér
2008	★ Zlatica Švajdová (née Puškárová) (5 consecutive wins)	Patrik Herman; Daniel Krajcer
2009	★ Zlatica Švajdová (née Puškárová) (5 consecutive wins)	Patrik Herman; Alena Heribanová

=== 2010s ===
Year	Recipient	Nominees
2010	★ Patrik Herman (7 consecutive wins)	Roman Juraško; Zlatica Švajdová
2011	★ Patrik Herman (7 consecutive wins)	Zlatica Švajdová; Erika Barkolová
2012	★ Patrik Herman (7 consecutive wins)	Ján Mečiar; Zlatica Švajdová
2013	★ Patrik Herman (7 consecutive wins)	Ján Mečiar; Zlatica Švajdová
2014	★ Patrik Herman (7 consecutive wins)	Kveta Horváthová (née Kmotorková); Pavol Fejér
2015	★ Patrik Herman (7 consecutive wins)	Kveta Horváthová (née Kmotorková); Pavol Fejér
2016	★ Patrik Herman (7 consecutive wins)	Pavol Fejér; Viktor Vincze

== Superlatives ==
=== Multiple winners ===
7 awards

- Patrik Herman

5 awards

- Zlatica Švajdová
  (née Puškárová)

=== Multiple nominees ===
12 nominations

- Patrik Herman

10 nominations

- Zlatica Švajdová

5 nominations

- Daniel Krajcer^{┼}

4 nominations

- Pavol Fejér

2 nominations

- Ján Mečiar

Notes

^{┼} Denotes also a winner in two or more of the main categories.
