= OTO Award for TV News Reporter =

Media award in Slovakia

OTO Award
TV News Reporter

Currently held by
Leona Kočkovičová

First awarded | Last awarded
2012 | Present

OTO Award for TV News Reporter has been awarded since the 13th edition of the accolades, established by Art Production Agency (APA) in Slovakia in 2000. Each year, the award has been presented to the most recognized television reporters in the news program of the past year with the ceremony permitted live by the national television network STV.

== Winners and nominees ==
=== 2010s ===
Year	Recipient	Nominees
2010	Not awarded	
2011	Not awarded	
2012	★ Jozef Kubáni (2 consecutive wins)	Miroslava Almásy; Danica Kleinová
2013	★ Jozef Kubáni (2 consecutive wins)	Danica Kleinová; Adam Zavřel
2014	★ Danica Kleinová	Jozef Kubáni; Adam Zavřel
2015	★ Jozef Kubáni	Danica Kleinová; Viktor Vincze
2016	★ Leona Kočkovičová^{†} (née Fučíková)	Jozef Kubáni; Veronika Ostrihoňová
^{†} denotes an in memoriam-nominee

== Superlatives ==
=== Multiple winners ===
3 awards

- Jozef Kubáni^{Ž}

=== Multiple nominees ===
5 nominations

- Jozef Kubáni

4 nominations

- Danica Kleinová

2 nominations

- Adam Zavřel

Notes

^{Ž} Denotes also a winner of the Život Award.
