= OTO Award for TV Female Actor =

OTO Award
TV Female Actor

Currently held by
Zuzana Mauréry

First awarded | Last awarded
2000 | Present

OTO Award for TV Female Actor has been bestowed to the most recognized female actors of the past year in Slovakia since 2000. In years 2010 and 2011, the award was split into two equivalent categories depending on a genre, TV drama or TV comedy. From 2012, the general category is held.

== Winners and nominees ==
=== 2000s ===
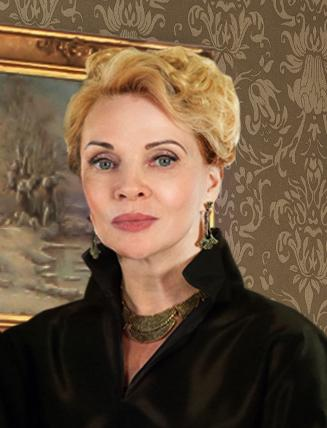
Zdena Studenková has won six consecutive times, making her the most winning actress.

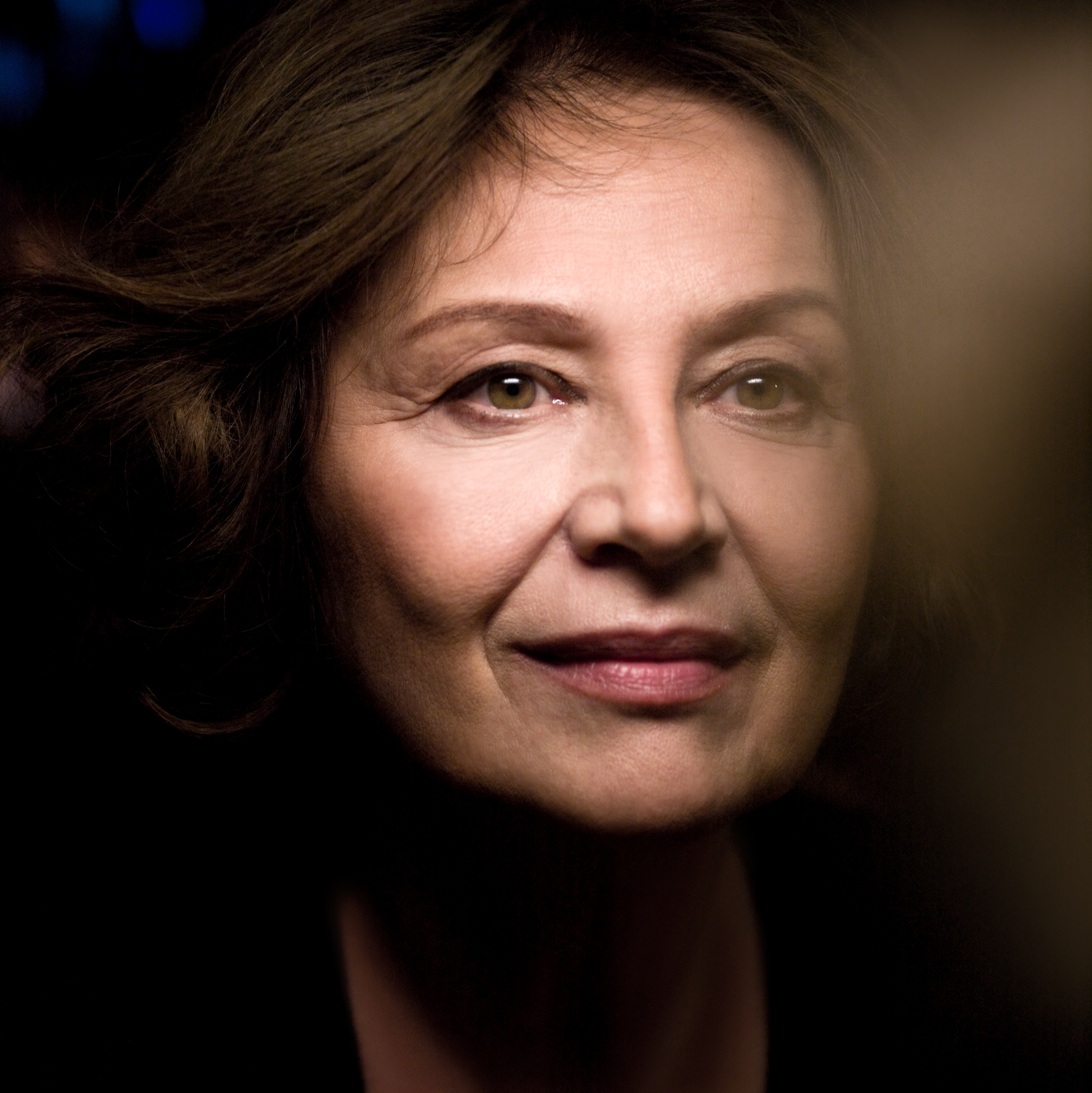
Emília Vášáryová comes the first in terms of her eight nominations, twice in drama.

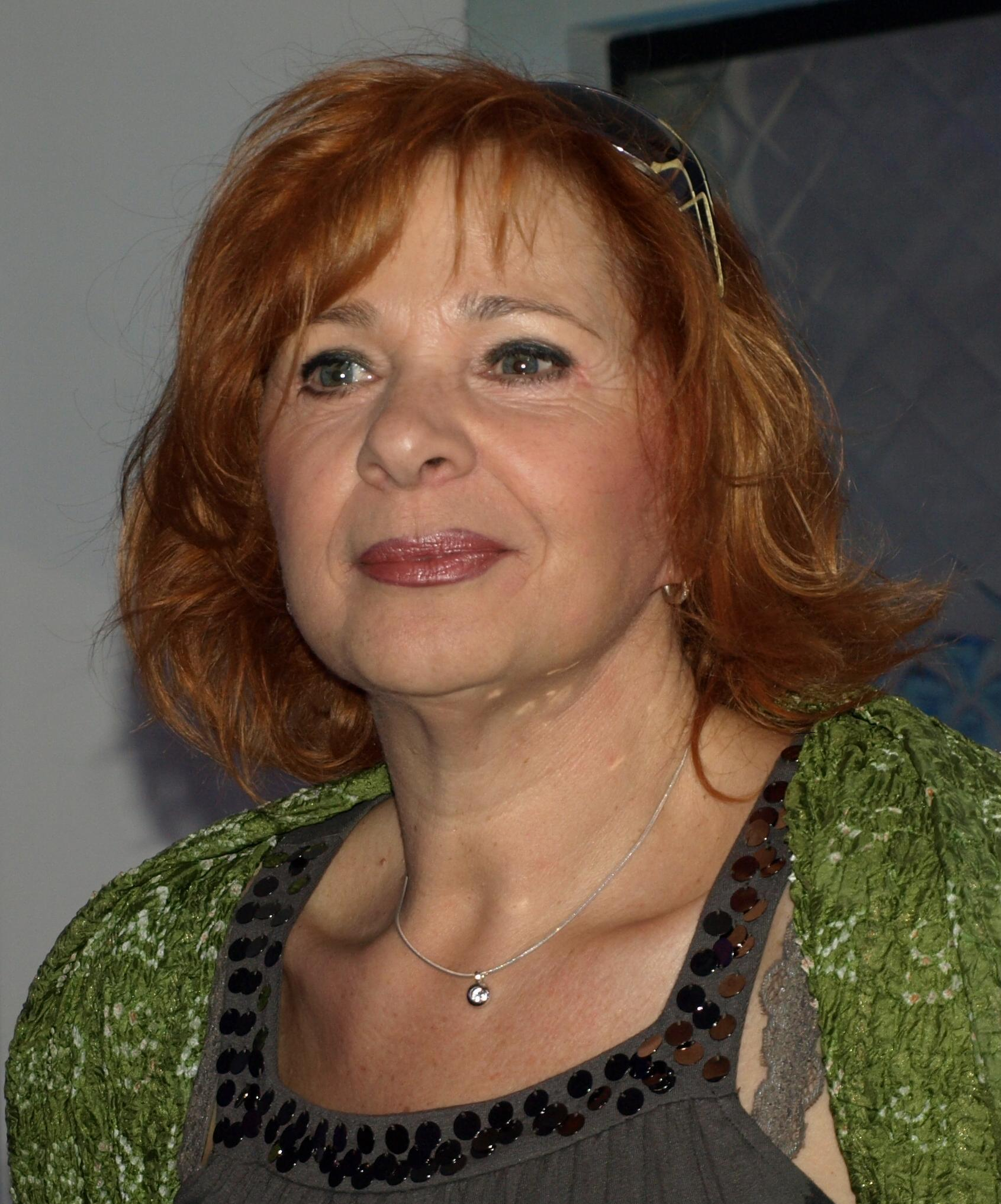
Kamila Magálová is one of the earliest triple nominees, having no winning bid though.

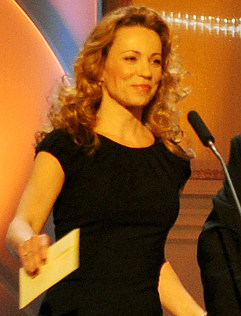
Diana Mórová has scored out of four nominations two awards, once in a genre.

Year	Recipient	Nominees
2000	★ Zdena Studenková (6 consecutive wins)	Kamila Magálová; Zuzana Kronerová
2001	★ Zdena Studenková (6 consecutive wins)	Anna Šišková; Emília Vášáryová
2002	★ Zdena Studenková (6 consecutive wins)	Kamila Magálová; Emília Vášáryová
2003	★ Zdena Studenková (6 consecutive wins)	Kamila Magálová; Emília Vášáryová
2004	★ Zdena Studenková (6 consecutive wins)	Magda Paveleková; Emília Vášáryová
2005	★ Zdena Studenková (6 consecutive wins)	Magda Paveleková; Emília Vášáryová
2006	★ Zuzana Fialová (2 consecutive wins)	Zuzana Tlučková; Viktória Ráková
2007	★ Zuzana Fialová (2 consecutive wins)	Zuzana Tlučková; Viktória Ráková
2008	★ Diana Mórová^{┼}	Michaela Čobejová; Zuzana Fialová
2009	★ Petra Polnišová	Gabriela Dzuríková; Emília Vášáryová

=== 2010s ===
Year	Recipient	Nominees
2010	Held only in genre	
2011	Held only in genre	
2012	★ Monika Hilmerová	Zuzana Kanócz; Petra Polnišová
2013	★ Helena Krajčiová	Monika Hilmerová; Diana Mórová
2014	★ Zuzana Šebová (2 consecutive wins)	Monika Hilmerová; Petra Polnišová
2015	★ Zuzana Šebová (2 consecutive wins)	Monika Hilmerová; Petra Polnišová
2016	★ Tatiana Pauhofová	Zuzana Mauréry; Zuzana Šebová
2017	★ Lujza Garajová-Schrameková	Tatiana Pauhofová; Zuzana Šebová
2018	★ Zuzana Mauréry	Tatiana Pauhofová; Mária Bartalos

=== Superlatives ===
==== Multiple winners ====
6 awards

- Zdena Studenková^{†}

2 awards

- Zuzana Fialová
- Zuzana Šebová

==== Multiple nominees ====
6 nominations

- Zdena Studenková^{†}
- Emília Vášáryová^{‡}

4 nominations

- Monika Hilmerová
- Petra Polnišová^{┼†}
- Zuzana Šebová

3 nominations

- Kamila Magálová
- Zuzana Fialová
- Tatiana Pauhofová

2 nominations

- Magda Paveleková^{‡}
- Zuzana Tlučková
- Viktória Ráková
- Diana Mórová

Notes

^{┼} Denotes also a winner in two or more of the main categories.
^{†} Denotes also a winner of the Absolute OTO category.
^{‡} Denotes also an inductee into the Hall of Fame OTO.

== Associated categories ==
OTO Award
TV Female Actor – Drama

First awarded | Last awarded
2010 | 2011

=== TV Female Actor – Drama ===
Year	Recipient	Nominees
2010	★ Emília Vášáryová	Diana Mórová; Gabriela Dzuríková
2011	★ Diana Mórová	Zuzana Tlučková; Emília Vášáryová

2 nominations

- Emília Vášáryová
- Diana Mórová

OTO Award
TV Female Actor – Comedy

First awarded | Last awarded
2010 | 2011

=== TV Female Actor – Comedy ===
Year	Recipient	Nominees
2010	★ Petra Polnišová (2 consecutive wins)	Helena Krajčiová; Gabriela Dzuríková
2011	★ Petra Polnišová (2 consecutive wins)	Helena Krajčiová; Monika Hilmerová

2 awards

- Petra Polnišová

2 nominations

- Petra Polnišová
- Helena Krajčiová
