= Plus 7 dní Award for TV Act of the Year =

Slovak award given to television hosts

Plus 7 dní Award
TV Act of the Year

Currently held by
Peter Núñez

First awarded | Last awarded
2003 | Present

Plus 7 dní Award for TV Act of the Year has been bestowed to the most recognized television host of the past year in Slovakia since 2003. Originally known as the EuroTelevízia Award (2003–2006) and Život Award (2007-2015), the accolade is given as part of the annual OTO Awards ceremony by the Plus 7 dní magazine as the official announcer of the awards show, and local journalists.

== Winners and nominees ==
=== 2000s ===
Year	Recipient	Nominees
2000	Not awarded	
2001	Not awarded	
2002	Not awarded	
EuroTelevízia Award
2003	★ IQ Test národa – JOJ	—
2004	★ Dievča za milión – JOJ	—
2005	★ V politike – TA3	—
2006	★ Najväčšie kriminálne prípady Slovenska – STV	—
Život Award
2007	★ MafStory – JOJ	Susedia – Markíza
2007	★ Téma dňa – TA3 (Special Achievement)	—
2008	★ Mesto tieňov – Markíza	—
2009	★ Martin Mózer – JOJ	—

=== 2010s ===
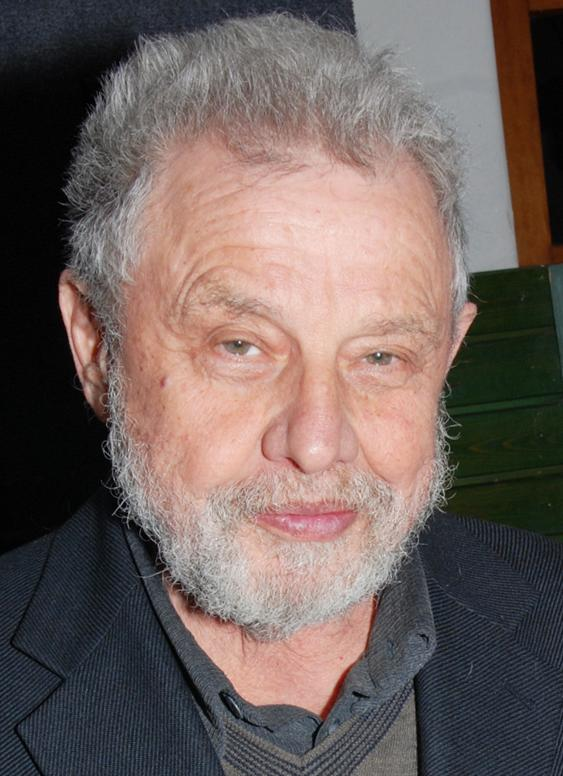
Pavel Dvořák

Year	Recipient	Nominees
2010	★ Peter Bielik – Téma dňa – TA3	—
2011	★ Jozef Kubáni	—
2012	★ Marcel Merčiak^{†}	—
2013	★ Pavol Barabáš	—
2014	★ Pavel Dvořák - Hľadanie stratených svetov	—
2015	★ Michal Kubovčík	—
Plus 7 dní Award
2016	★ Peter Núñez	—

Notes

^{†} Denotes also a winner of the Absolute OTO category.

== Superlatives ==
=== Multiple winners ===
2 awards

- Téma dňa – TA3 (including Special Achievement Award)
