= OTO Award for Female Singer =

OTO Award
Female Singer

Currently held by
Kristína

First awarded | Last awarded
2000 | Present

OTO Award for Female Singer has been awarded since the first edition of the accolades, established by Art Production Agency (APA) in Slovakia. Each year, the award is presented to the most recognized female artists of the past year with the ceremony permitted live by the national television network STV.

== Winners and nominees ==
=== 2000s ===
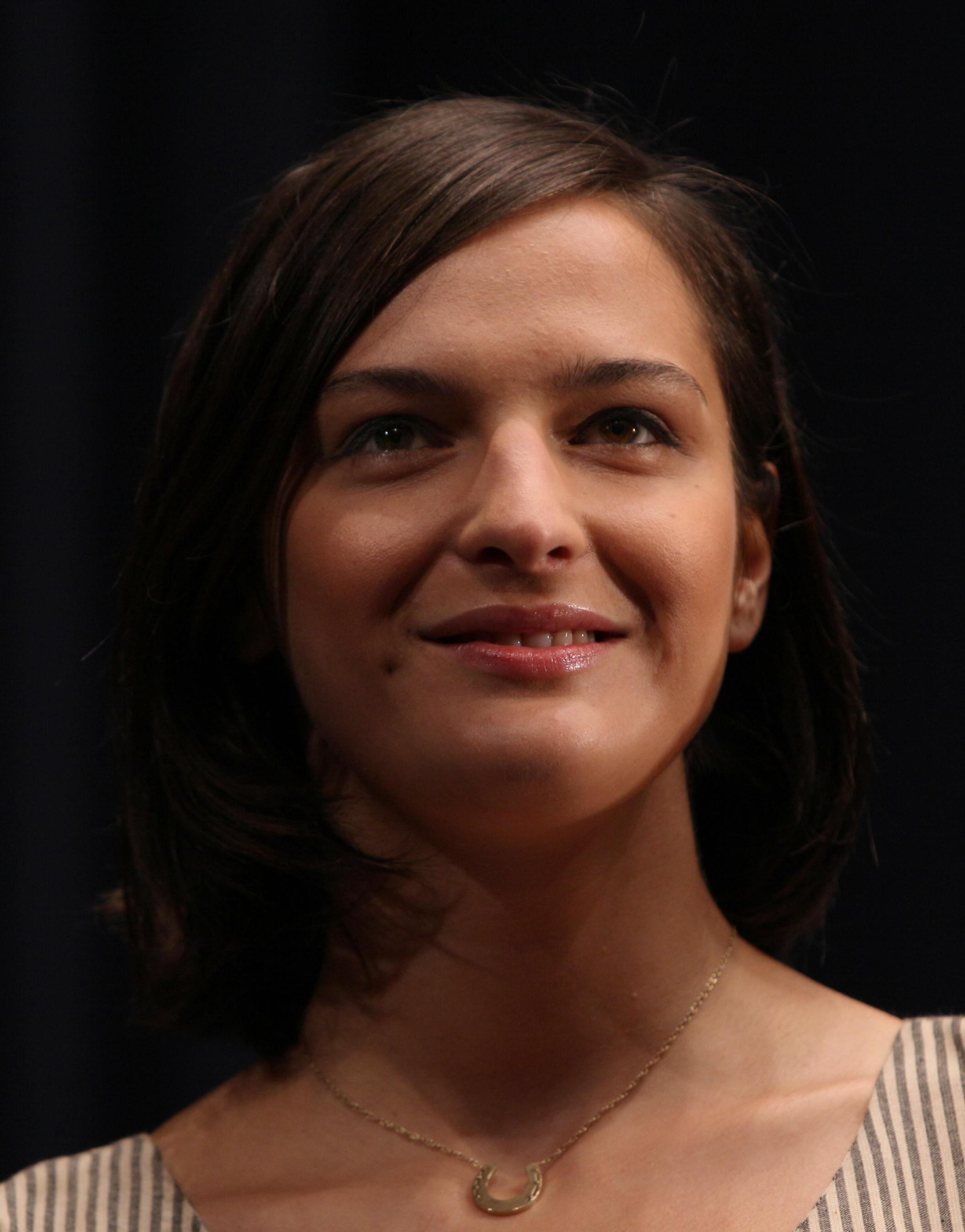
Jana Kirschner leads the category, having accumulated four trophies to her credit.

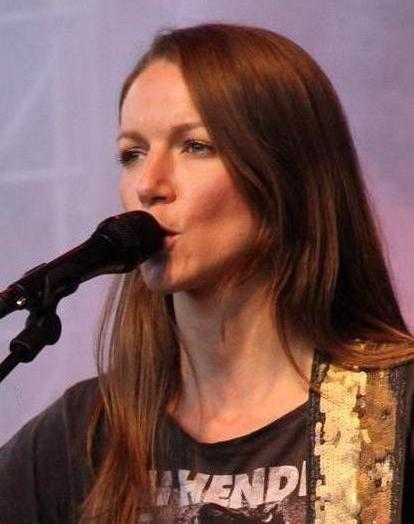
Zuzana Smatanová comes the first with the most achieved nominations, ten.

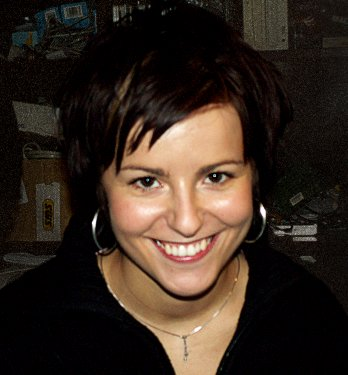
Katarína Knechtová has scooped two wins, being nominated four times.

Year	Recipient	Nominees
2000	★ Jana Kirschner	Katarína Hasprová; Marika Gombitová
2001	★ Marika Gombitová	Katarína Hasprová; Jana Kirschner
2002	★ Misha (2 consecutive wins)	Katarína Hasprová; Jana Kirschner
2003	★ Misha (2 consecutive wins)	Dara Rolins; Jana Kirschner
2004	★ Zuzana Smatanová (2 consecutive wins)	Misha; Jana Kirschner
2005	★ Zuzana Smatanová (2 consecutive wins)	Marika Gombitová; Jana Kirschner
2006	★ Katarína Knechtová (2 consecutive wins)	Zuzana Smatanová; Zdenka Predná
2007	★ Katarína Knechtová (2 consecutive wins)	Zuzana Smatanová; Zdenka Predná
2008	★ Jana Kirschner (3 consecutive wins)	Katarína Knechtová; Zuzana Smatanová
2009	★ Jana Kirschner (3 consecutive wins)	Katarína Knechtová; Zuzana Smatanová

=== 2010s ===
Year	Recipient	Nominees
2010	(See above)	Zuzana Smatanová; Kristína
2011	★ Nela Pocisková	Zuzana Smatanová; Tina
2012	★ Celeste Buckingham (3 consecutive wins)	Nela Pocisková; Zuzana Smatanová
2013	★ Celeste Buckingham (3 consecutive wins)	Nela Pocisková; Zuzana Smatanová
2014	★ Celeste Buckingham (3 consecutive wins)	Marika Gombitová; Kristína
2015	★ Kristína (2 consecutive wins)	Celeste Buckingham; Mária Čírová
2016	★ Kristína (2 consecutive wins)	Mária Čírová; Emma Drobná
2017	★ Mária Čírová	
2018	★ Simona Martausová (2 consecutive wins)	
2019	★ Simona Martausová (2 consecutive wins)	

== Superlatives ==
=== Multiple winners ===
4 awards

- Jana Kirschner

3 awards

- Celeste Buckingham

2 awards

- Misha
- Zuzana Smatanová
- Katarína Knechtová
- Kristína

=== Multiple nominees ===
10 nominations

- Zuzana Smatanová

9 nominations

- Jana Kirschner

4 nominations

- Katarína Knechtová
- Marika Gombitová
- Celeste Buckingham
- Kristína

3 nominations

- Katarína Hasprová
- Misha
- Nela Pocisková

2 nominations

- Zdenka Predná
- Mária Čírová
