= OTO Award for TV Program =

OTO Award
TV Program

Currently held by
Tvoja tvár znie povedome – Markíza

First awarded | Last awarded
2000 | Present

OTO Award for TV Program has been awarded to the most outstanding television program of the previous year in Slovakia since 2000. The category includes various formats, such as reality television and television specials

== Winners and nominees ==
=== 2000s ===
Year	Recipient	Nominees
2000	★ Dereš – Markíza	Televízne noviny – Markíza; Sensi Senzus – STV
2001	★ Milionár – Markíza	Večer Milana Markoviča – STV; Dereš – Markíza
2002	★ Je to možné!? – Markíza	Uragán – STV; Dereš – Markíza
2003	★ Uragán – STV	Inkognito – JOJ; Drišľakoviny – STV
2004	★ Slovensko hľadá SuperStar – STV (Series 1 and 2) (2 consecutive wins)	Uragán– STV; Vilomeniny – Markíza
2005	★ Slovensko hľadá SuperStar – STV (Series 1 and 2) (2 consecutive wins)	VyVolení– JOJ; S.O.S.– STV
2006	★ Susedia – Markíza (2 consecutive wins)	Let's Dance– Markíza; Pošta pre teba – STV
2007	★ Susedia – Markíza (2 consecutive wins)	Bailando– Markíza; Slovensko hľadá SuperStar – Markíza
2008	★ Slovensko má talent – Markíza	Let's Dance – Markíza; Hodina deťom – STV
2009	★ Česko Slovenská Superstar – Markíza	Novoročný príhovor tety Márgit – JOJ; Téma dňa – TA3

=== 2010s ===
Year	Recipient	Nominees
2010	★ Česko Slovensko má talent – JOJ	Let's Dance – Markíza; Talent Mánia
2011	★ Srdce pre deti – JOJ (3 consecutive wins)	Česko Slovensko má talent – JOJ; Legendy Popu – RTVS
2012	★ Srdce pre deti – JOJ (3 consecutive wins)	Česko Slovensko má talent – JOJ; MS v ľadovom hokeji 2012 – RTVS
2013	★ Srdce pre deti – JOJ (3 consecutive wins)	Česko Slovensko má talent – JOJ; MS v ľadovom hokeji 2013 – RTVS
2014	★ V siedmom nebi – JOJ	MS v ľadovom hokeji 2014 – RTVS; Trochu inak v SND – TA3
2015	★ Chart show – Markíza	Čo ja viem – RTVS; V siedmom nebi – JOJ
2016	★ Tvoja tvár znie povedome – Markíza	Projekt LOH v Riu 2016 – RTVS; V siedmom nebi – JOJ

== Superlatives ==
=== Multiple winners ===
3 awards

- Srdce pre deti

2 awards

- Slovensko hľadá SuperStar
- Susedia

=== Multiple nominees ===
4 nominations

- Česko Slovensko má talent

3 nominations

- Dereš
- Uragán
- Let's Dance
- Srdce pre deti
- Slovensko hľadá SuperStar
- MS v ľadovom hokeji
- V siedmom nebi

2 nominations

- Susedia
