= Karol Machata =

Slovak actor

- Born: 13 January 1928; Malacky, Czechoslovakia
- Died: 3 May 2016 (aged 88); Bratislava, Slovakia
- Occupation: Actor
- Years active: 1951–1992

Karol Machata (13 January 1928 – 3 May 2016) was a Slovak actor. He appeared in more than 40 films and television shows between 1951 and 1992. He was inducted into the Hall of Fame at the 8th OTO Awards in 2007.

== Selected filmography ==
- St. Peter's Umbrella (1958)
- A Song About the Gray Pigeon (1961)
