= 1st OTO Awards =

1st OTO Awards

February 3, 2001

Andrej Bagar Theatre, Nitra, Slovakia

Overall winner
Jarmila Hargašová

Hall of Fame
Jozef Kroner

2nd ►

The 1st OTO Awards, honoring the best in Slovak popular culture for the year 2000, took time and place on February 3, 2001 at the Andrej Bagar Theatre in Nitra. The ceremony was broadcast live by STV and was hosted by Tibor Hlista.

== Presenters ==
- Karel Fiala, actor
- Pavol Hammel, musician
- Blažena Kočtúchová, TV announcer
- Zora Kolínska, actress
- Eva Krížiková, actress
- Táňa Lucká, EuroTelevízia chief editor
- Milan Materák, STV managing director
- Izabela Pažítková, TV announcer
- Karol Polák, TV sport commentator
- Nora Selecká, TV announcer
- Eva Štefániková, Allianz representative

== Performers ==
- Close Harmony Friends, vocal group
- Pavol Habera, singer
- Pavol Hammel, Gladiator and Petr Rajchert
- Katarína Hasprová, singer
- Jana Kirschner, singer
- Richard Müller and B3
- Senzus, band

== Winners and nominees ==
=== Main categories ===
Television

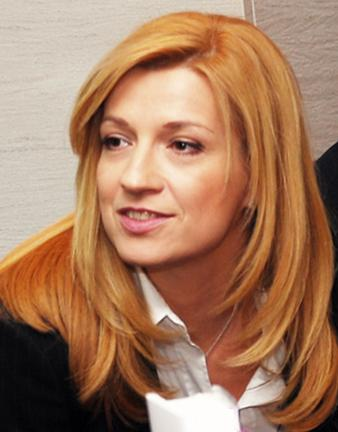
Jarmila Lajčáková

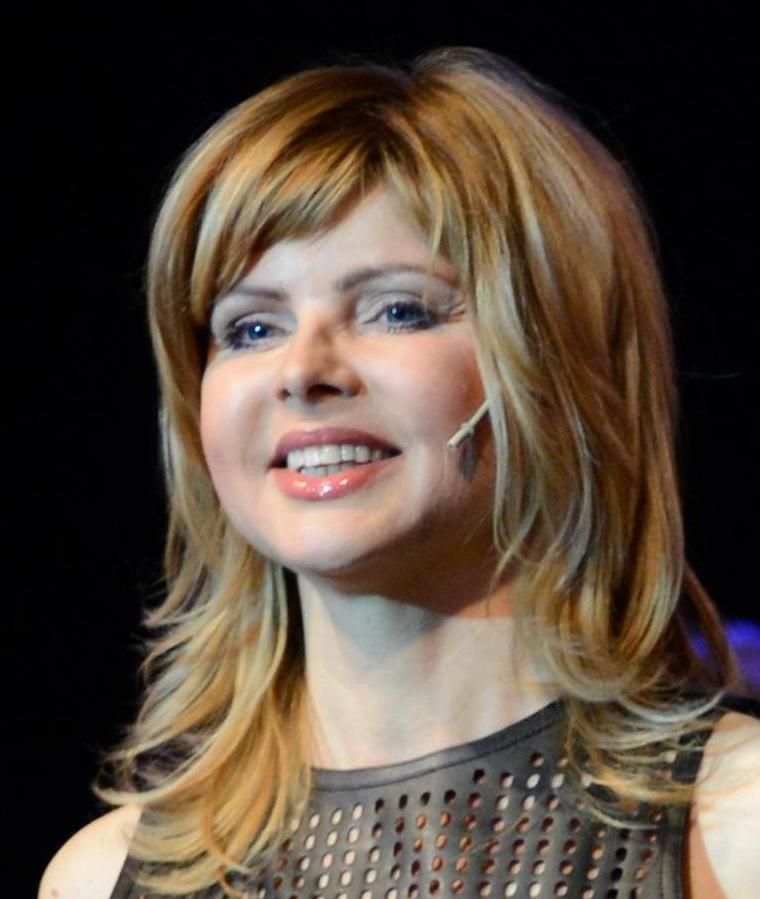
Soňa Müllerová

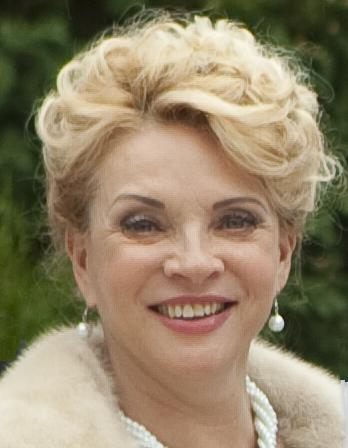
Zdena Studenková

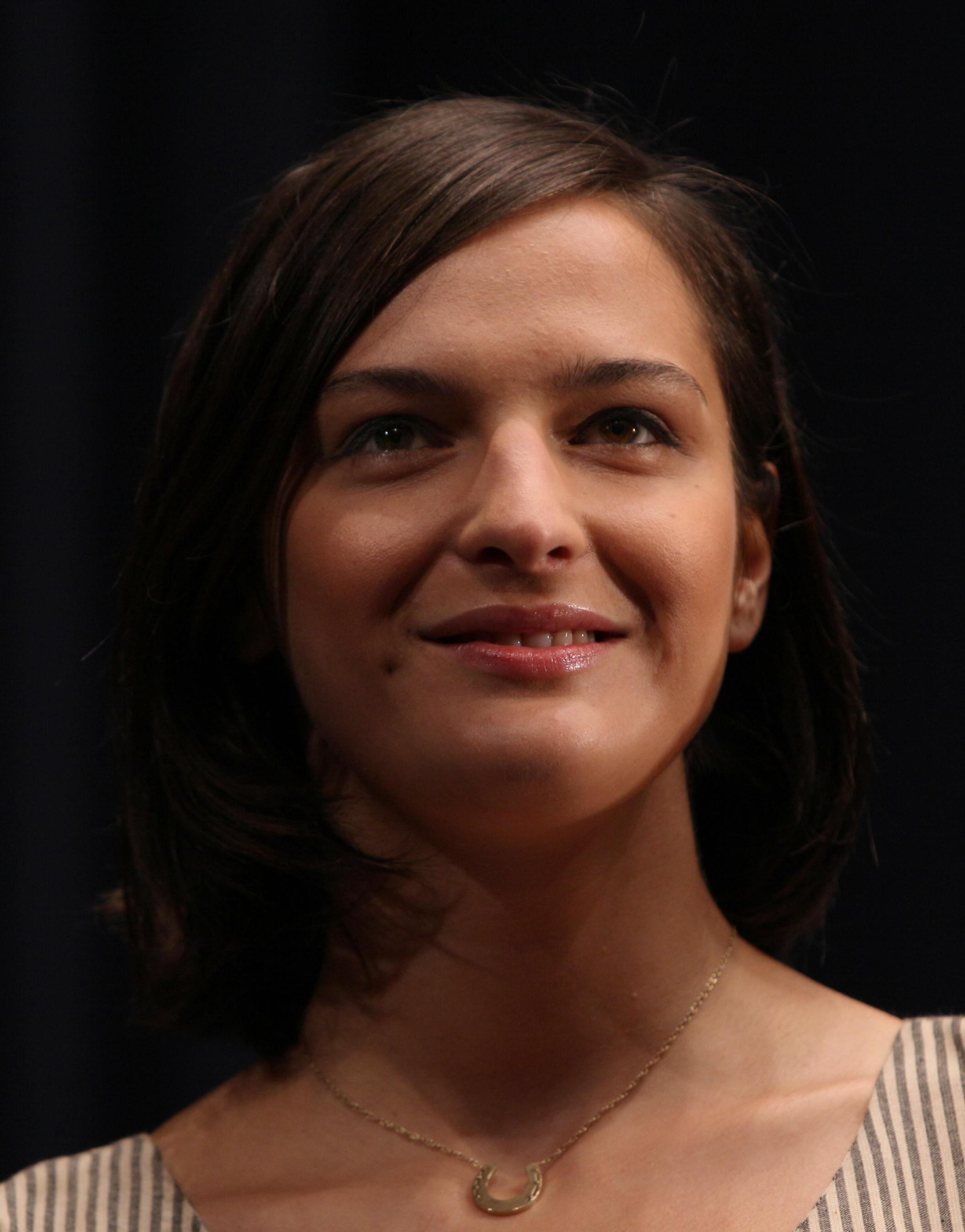
Jana Kirschner

News Host	Sports Host
★ Aneta Parišková: Ľubomír Karásek; Jana Majeská	★ Jarmila Lajčáková (née Hargašová): Miroslav Michalech; Stanislav Ščepán
Journalist	Entertainer
★ Eva Černá: Patrik Herman; Daniel Krajcer	★ Jozef Pročko: Milan Markovič; Viliam Rozboril
Announcer
★ Soňa Müllerová; Miloš Bubán; Alena Heribanová
Actor	Actress
★ Michal Dočolomanský: Maroš Kramár; Ladislav Chudík	★ Zdena Studenková: Kamila Magálová; Zuzana Kronerová
Program
★ Dereš – Markíza; Televízne noviny – Markíza; Sensi Senzus – STV

Music

Male Singer	Female Singer
★ Jozef Ráž: Pavol Habera; Richard Müller	★ Jana Kirschner: Katarína Hasprová; Marika Gombitová

=== Others ===
Overall winner	★ Jarmila Lajčáková (née Hargašová)
Hall of Fame	★ Jozef Kroner (In Memoriam)
