= 16th OTO Awards =

16th OTO Awards

March 12, 2016

SND, Bratislava, Slovakia

Overall winner
Adela Banášová

Hall of Fame
Emil Horváth

Život Award
Michal Kubovčík

◄ 15th | 17th ►

The 16th OTO Awards honoring the best in Slovak popular culture for the year 2015, took time and place on March 12, 2016 at the former Opera building of the Slovak National Theater in Bratislava. The ceremony was broadcast live the channel Jednotka of RTVS. The hosts of the upcoming show were for the fourth consecutive time, Adela Banášová and Matej "Sajfa" Cifra.

== Schedule ==
Date	Event
Friday, December 25, 2015	Opening for submission of entry forms – 1st round
Friday, January 22, 2016	Deadline for receiving voting ballots – 1st round
Friday, January 29, 2016	Top 7 nominees announced
Friday, January 29, 2016	Opening for submission of entry forms – 2nd round
Friday, February 19, 2016	Deadline for receiving voting ballots – 2nd round
Unspecified	Top 3 nominees announced
Saturday, March 12, 2016	Winners announced

== Nominees ==
=== Main categories ===
Television

News Host	News Reporter
★ Adriana Kmotríková: Ľubomír Bajaník; Mária Chreneková (née Pietrová)	★ Jozef Kubáni: Danica Kleinová; Viktor Vincze
Sports Host	Sports Commentator
★ Marcel Merčiak: Lenka Čviriková (née Hriadelová); Peter Varinský	★ Marcel Merčiak: Štefan Eisele; Ján Plesník
Host	Journalist
★ Adela Banášová: Marcel Forgáč; Milan Zimnýkoval	★ Patrik Herman: Pavol Fejér; Kveta Horváthová
Actor	Actress
★ Daniel Heriban: Ján Koleník; Michal Kubovčík	★ Zuzana Šebová: Monika Hilmerová; Petra Polnišová
Program	Show
★ Chart show – Markíza: Čo ja viem – RTVS; V siedmom nebi – JOJ	★ Milujem Slovensko – RTVS: Kredenc – Markíza; Moja mama varí lepšie ako tvoja – JOJ
Series
Horná Dolná – Markíza; Doktor Martin – RTVS; Tajné životy – RTVS

Music

Male Singer	Female Singer
★ Adam Ďurica: Samuel Tomeček; Miroslav Žbirka	★ Kristína: Celeste Buckingham; Mária Čírová
Band
Fragile; Elán; IMT Smile

=== Others ===
Overall winner	★ Adela Banášová
Hall of Fame	★ Emil Horváth
Život Award	★ Michal Kubovčík

== Superlatives ==
Having two simultaneous winning nominations, Marcel Merčiak has become the first participant of the TV poll to achieve it.

=== Multiple winners ===
2 awards

- Marcel Merčiak

=== Multiple nominees ===
2 nominations

- Marcel Merčiak
