= 15th OTO Awards =

Slovak awards ceremony

15th OTO Awards

March 14, 2015

SND, Bratislava, Slovakia

Overall winner
Adela Banášová

Hall of Fame
Marika Gombitová

Život Award
Pavel Dvořák

◄ 14th | 16th ►

The 15th OTO Awards honoring the best in Slovak popular culture for the year 2014, took time and place on March 14, 2015 at the former Opera building of the Slovak National Theater in Bratislava. The ceremony broadcast live the channel Jednotka of RTVS, while the hosts of the show were Adela Banášová and Matej "Sajfa" Cifra, both for the third time in a row.

== Nominees ==
=== Main categories ===
Television

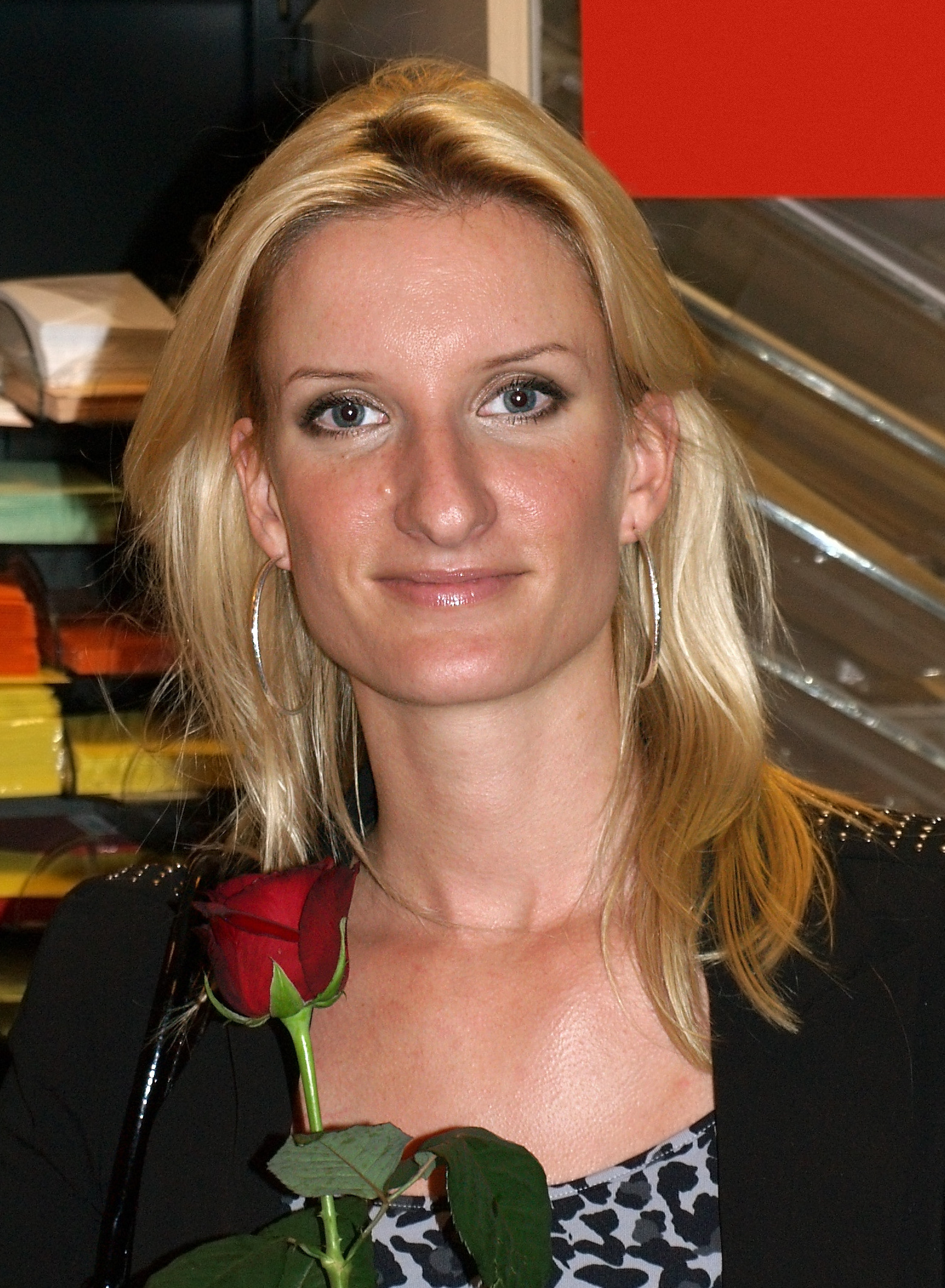
Adela Banášová

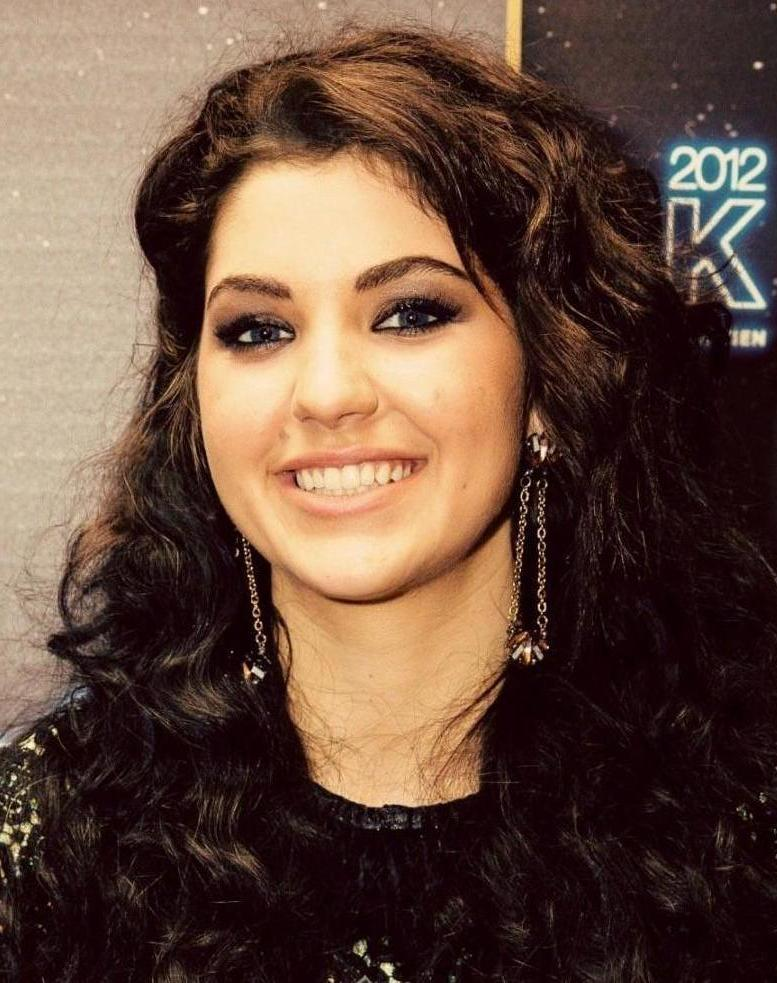
Celeste Buckingham

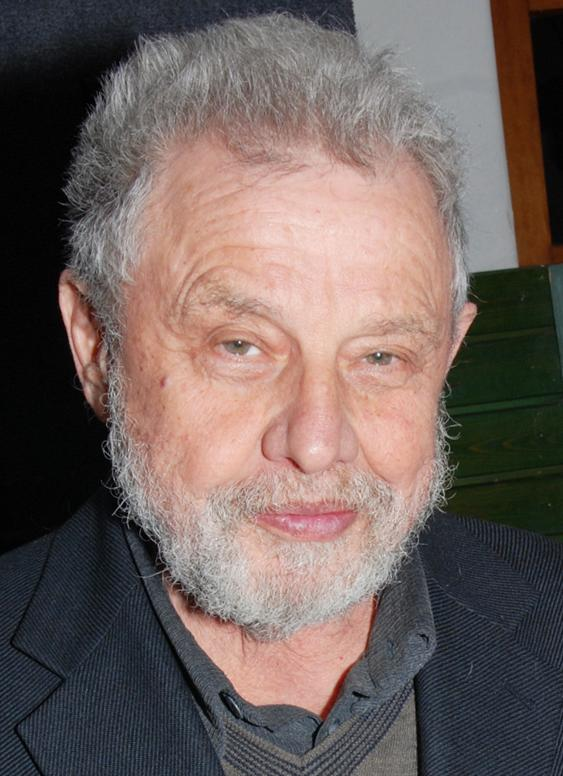
Pavel Dvořák

News Host	News Reporter
★ Ján Mečiar: Ľubomír Bajaník; Lucia Barmošová	★ Danica Kleinová: Jozef Kubáni; Adam Zavřel
Sports Host	Sports Commentator
★ Peter Varinský: Lenka Čviriková (née Hriadelová); Marcel Merčiak	★ Marcel Merčiak: Štefan Eisele; Ján Plesník
Host	Journalist
★ Adela Banášová: Andrej Bičan; Marcel Forgáč	★ Patrik Herman: Kveta Horváthová; Pavol Fejér
Actor	Actress
★ Juraj Kemka: Lukáš Latinák; Tomáš Maštalír	★ Zuzana Šebová: Monika Hilmerová; Petra Polnišová
Program	Show
★ V siedmom nebi – JOJ: MS v ľadovom hokeji 2014 – RTVS; Trochu inak v SND – TA3	★ Milujem Slovensko – RTVS: 5 proti 5 – RTVS; Kredenc – Markíza
Series
★ Búrlivé víno – Markíza; Panelák – JOJ; Profesionáli – JOJ

Music

Male Singer	Female Singer
★ Adam Ďurica: Marián Čekovský; Miroslav Žbirka	★ Celeste Buckingham: Marika Gombitová; Kristína
Band
★ Fragile; IMT Smile; Peter Bič Project

=== Others ===
Overall winner	★ Adela Banášová
Hall of Fame	★ Marika Gombitová
Život Award	★ Pavel Dvořák - Hľadanie stratených svetov

== Reception ==
=== TV ratings ===
The show has received a total audience of more than 601,000 viewers, making it the most watched television program within prime time in the region.
