= 17th OTO Awards =

Slowak popular culture awards

17th OTO Awards

March 11, 2017

SND, Bratislava, Slovakia

Overall winner
Adela Banášová

Hall of Fame
Božidara Turzonovová

Plus 7 dní Award
Peter Núñez

◄ 16th | 18th ►

The 17th OTO Awards honoring the best in Slovak popular culture for the year 2016, took time and place on March 11, 2017, at the new premises of the Slovak National Theater in Bratislava. The ceremony will broadcast live the channel Jednotka of RTVS. The hosts of the upcoming show will be for the fifth consecutive time, Adela Banášová and Matej Cifra.

== Schedule ==
| Date | Event |
|---|---|
| Monday, December 26, 2016 | Opening for submission of entry forms – 1st round |
| Sunday, January 22, 2017 | Deadline for receiving voting ballots – 1st round |
| Sunday, January 29, 2017 | Top 7 nominees announced |
| Monday, January 30, 2017 | Opening for submission of entry forms – 2nd round |
| Sunday, February 19, 2016 | Deadline for receiving voting ballots – 2nd round |
| Saturday, March 11, 2017 | Top 3 nominees announced |
| Saturday, March 11, 2017 | Winners announced |

== Nominees ==
=== Main categories ===
Television

| News Host | News Reporter |
|---|---|
| ★ Adriana Kmotríková: Ľubomír Bajaník; Mária Chreneková (née Pietrová) | ★ Leona Kočkovičová (née Fučíková)^{†}: Jozef Kubáni; Veronika Cifrová (née Ostrihoňová) |
| Sports Host | Sports Commentator |
| ★ Marcel Merčiak: Lenka Čviriková (née Hriadelová); Peter Varinský | ★ Marcel Merčiak: Štefan Eisele; Slávo Jurko |
| Host | Journalist |
| ★ Adela Banášová: Andrej Bičan; Marcel Forgáč | ★ Patrik Herman: Pavol Fejér; Viktor Vincze |
| Actor | Actress |
| ★ Michal Hudák: Daniel Heriban; Ján Koleník | ★ Tatiana Pauhofová: Zuzana Mauréry; Zuzana Šebová |
| Program | Show |
| ★ Tvoja tvár znie povedome – Markíza: Projekt LOH v Riu 2016 – RTVS; V siedmom nebi – JOJ | ★ Milujem Slovensko – RTVS: Dobre vedieť! – Markíza; Inkognito – JOJ |
Series
★ Horná Dolná (season 3 and 4) – Markíza; Doktor Martin (season 2) – RTVS; Naši – JOJ
^{†} denotes an in memoriam-nominee

Music

| Male Singer | Female Singer |
|---|---|
| ★ Adam Ďurica: Samuel Tomeček; Miroslav Žbirka | ★ Kristína: Mária Čírová; Emma Drobná |
Band
★ IMT Smile; Desmod; Fragile

=== Others ===
| Overall winner | ★ Adela Banášová |
| Hall of Fame | ★ Božidara Turzonovová |
| Plus 7 dní Award | ★ Peter Núñez |
