= 5th OTO Awards =

5th OTO Awards

February 9, 2005

NTC, Bratislava, Slovakia

Overall winner
Zdena Studenková

Hall of Fame
Milan Lasica

EuroTelevízia Award
Dievča za milión

◄ 4th | 6th ►

The 5th OTO Awards, honoring the best in Slovak popular culture for the year 2004, took time and place on February 9, 2005, at the National Tennis Center (NTC) in Bratislava. The ceremony broadcast live STV. The host of the show, for a change, was Halina Pawlowská.

== Performers ==
- Martin Babjak, opera singer
- Gladiator, band
- Misha, singer
- Dara Rolins, singer
- Zuzana Smatanová, singer
- Tina, singer
- Miroslav Žbirka and Linda Žbirková, singer

== Winners and nominees ==
=== Main categories ===
Television

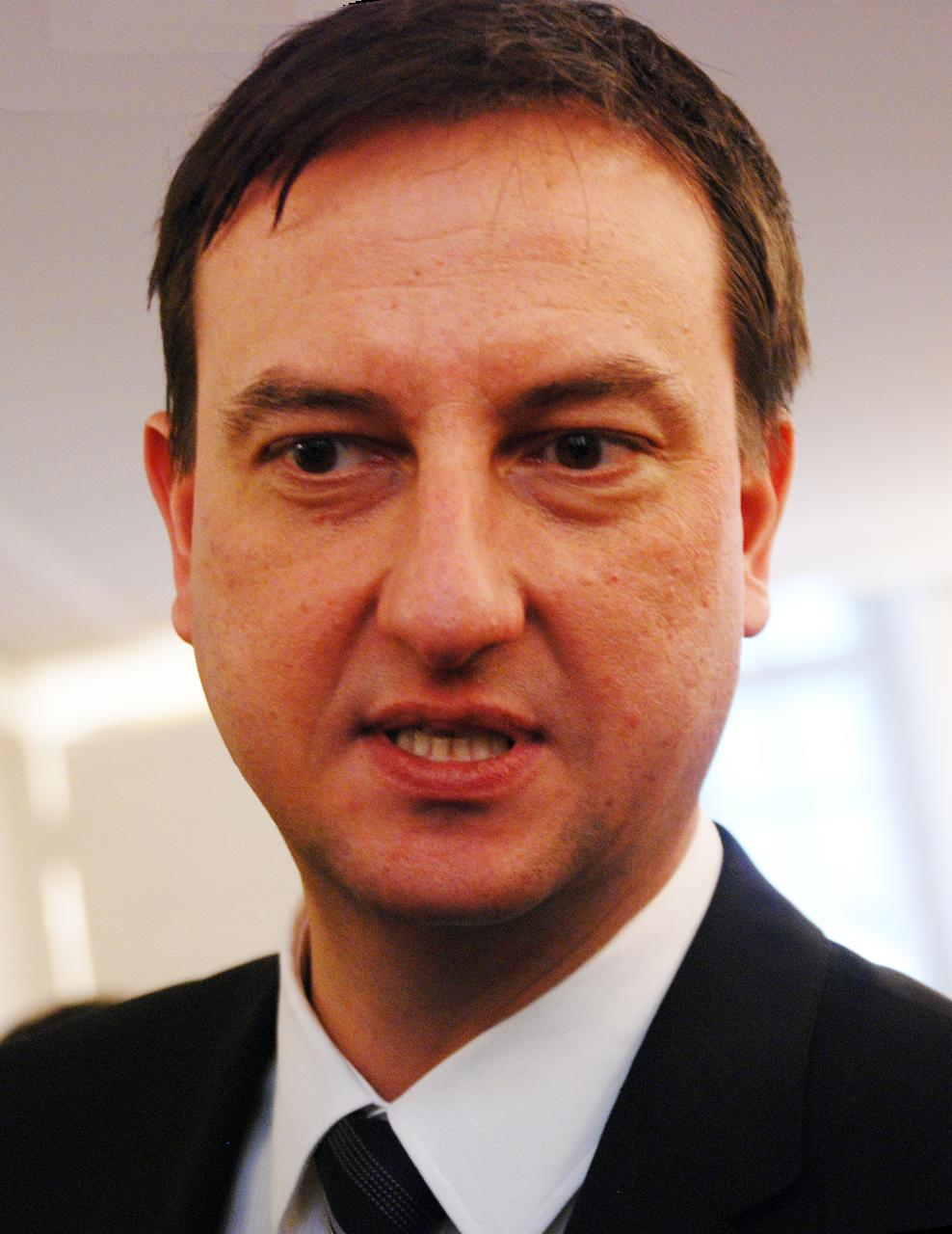
Daniel Krajcer

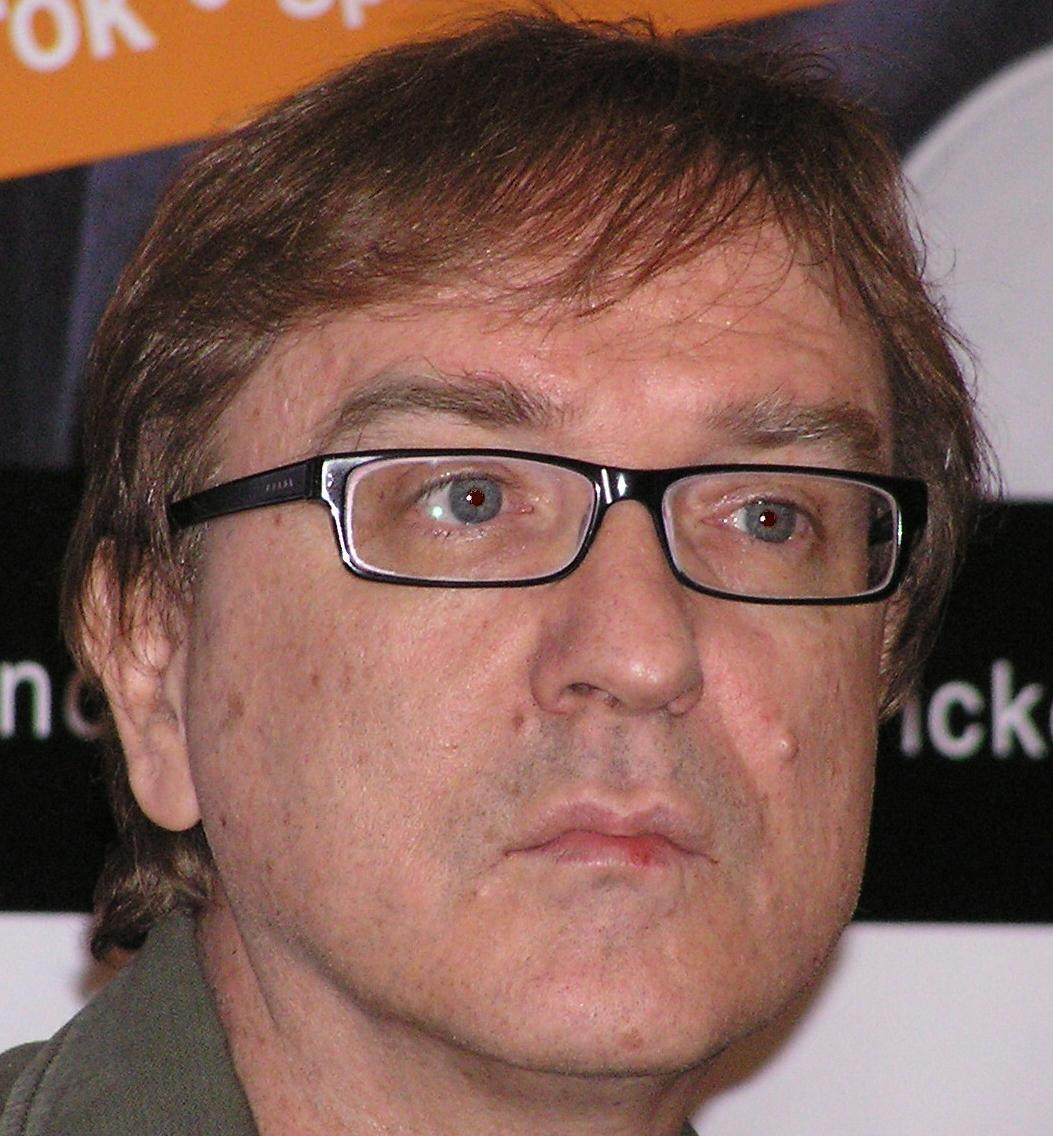
Miroslav Žbirka

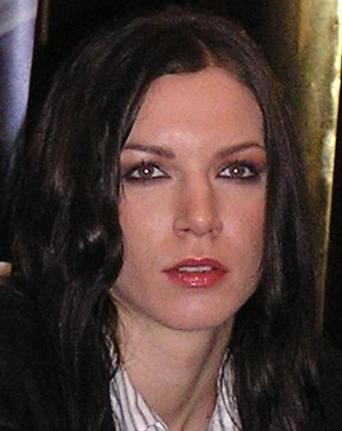
Zuzana Smatanová

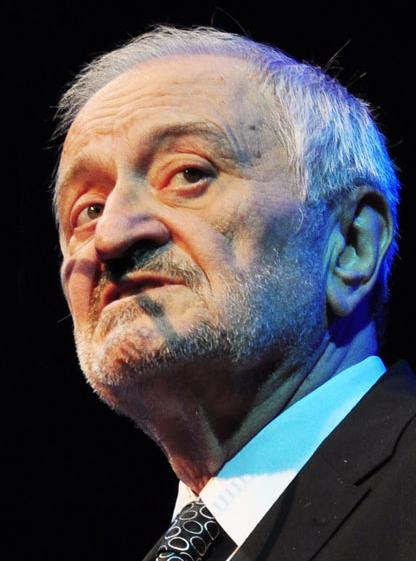
Milan Lasica

News Host	Sports Host or Commentator
★ Aneta Parišková: Marianna Ďurianová; Andrea Pálffy (née Belányiová)	★ Martina Šimkovičová (née Bartošíková): Lenka Čviriková (née Hriadelová); Ján Plesník
Journalist	Entertainer
★ Daniel Krajcer: Patrik Herman; Zlatica Švajdová (née Puškárová)	★ Viliam Rozboril: Peter Marcin; Michal Hudák
Children's Program Host
★ Jozef Nodžák; Martin Vanek and Igor Adamec; Petra Jurínová
Actor	Actress
★ Maroš Kramár: Michal Dočolomanský; Janko Kroner	★ Zdena Studenková: Magda Paveleková; Emília Vášáryová
Program
★ Slovensko hľadá SuperStar – STV; Uragán– STV; Vilomeniny – Markíza

Music

Male Singer	Female Singer
★ Miroslav Žbirka: Pavol Habera; Ivan Tásler	★ Zuzana Smatanová: Misha; Jana Kirschner

=== Others ===
Overall winner	★ Zdena Studenková
Hall of Fame	★ Milan Lasica
EuroTelevízia Award	★ Dievča za milión – JOJ
