= Hall of Fame OTO Award =

Hall of Fame OTO Award

Currently held by
Božidara Turzonovová

First awarded | Last awarded
2000 | Present

Hall of Fame OTO Award has been annually presented at the OTO Awards ceremony for lifetime achievements. Since 2000, the honor is given by the Academy of Personalities of Culture and Social Life in Slovakia.

== Honorees ==
=== 2000s ===
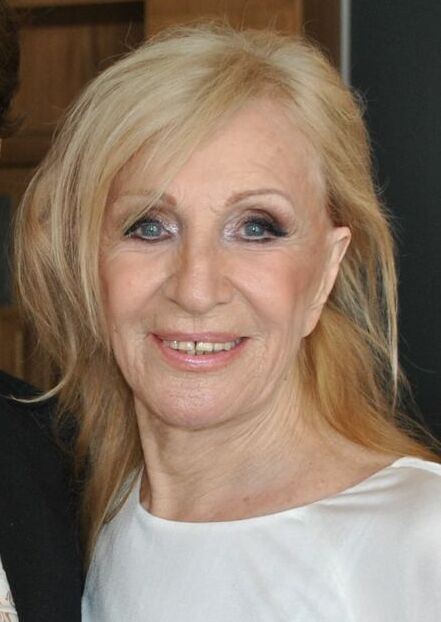
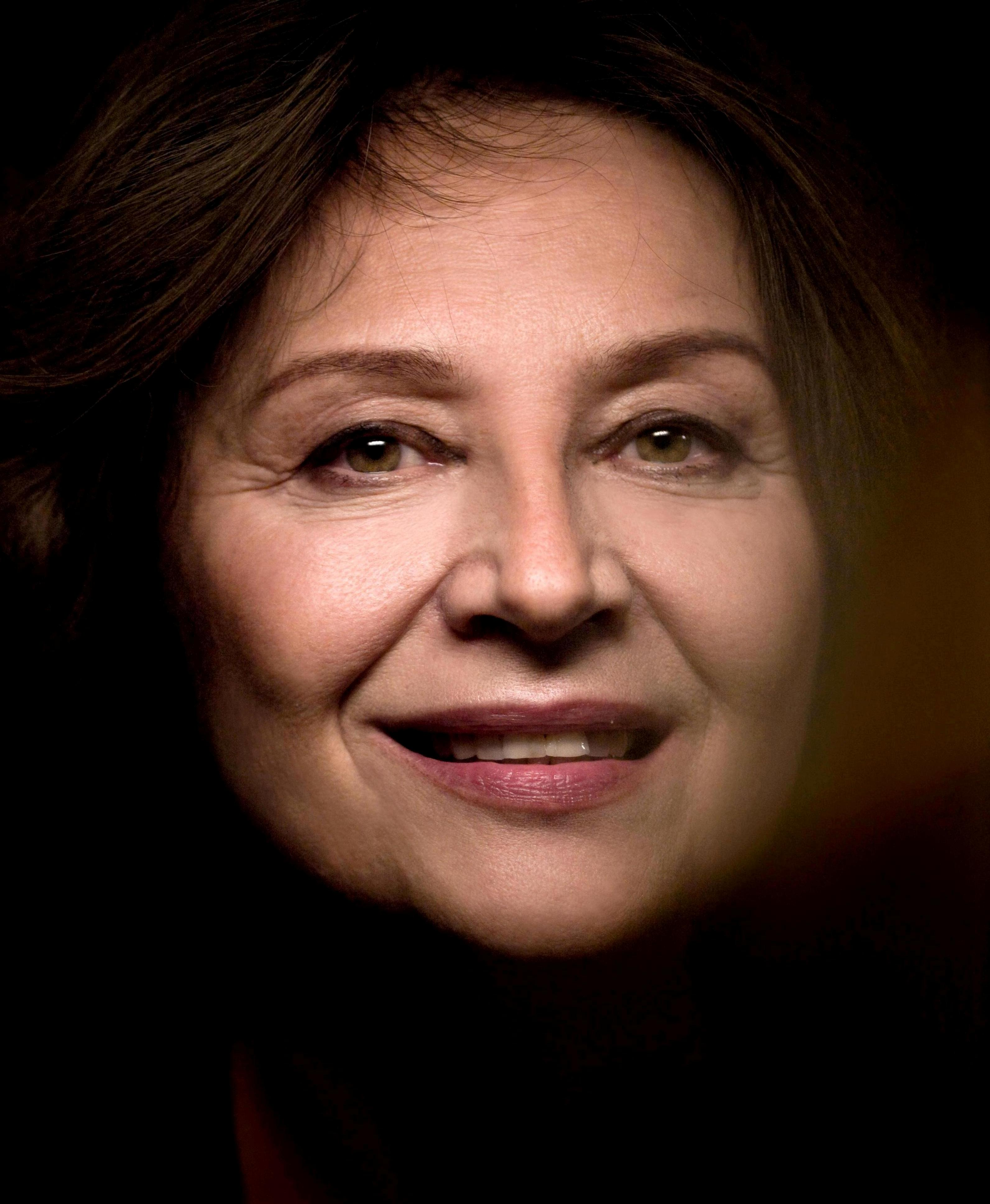
Left to right: Actresses Mária Kráľovičová and Emília Vášáryová
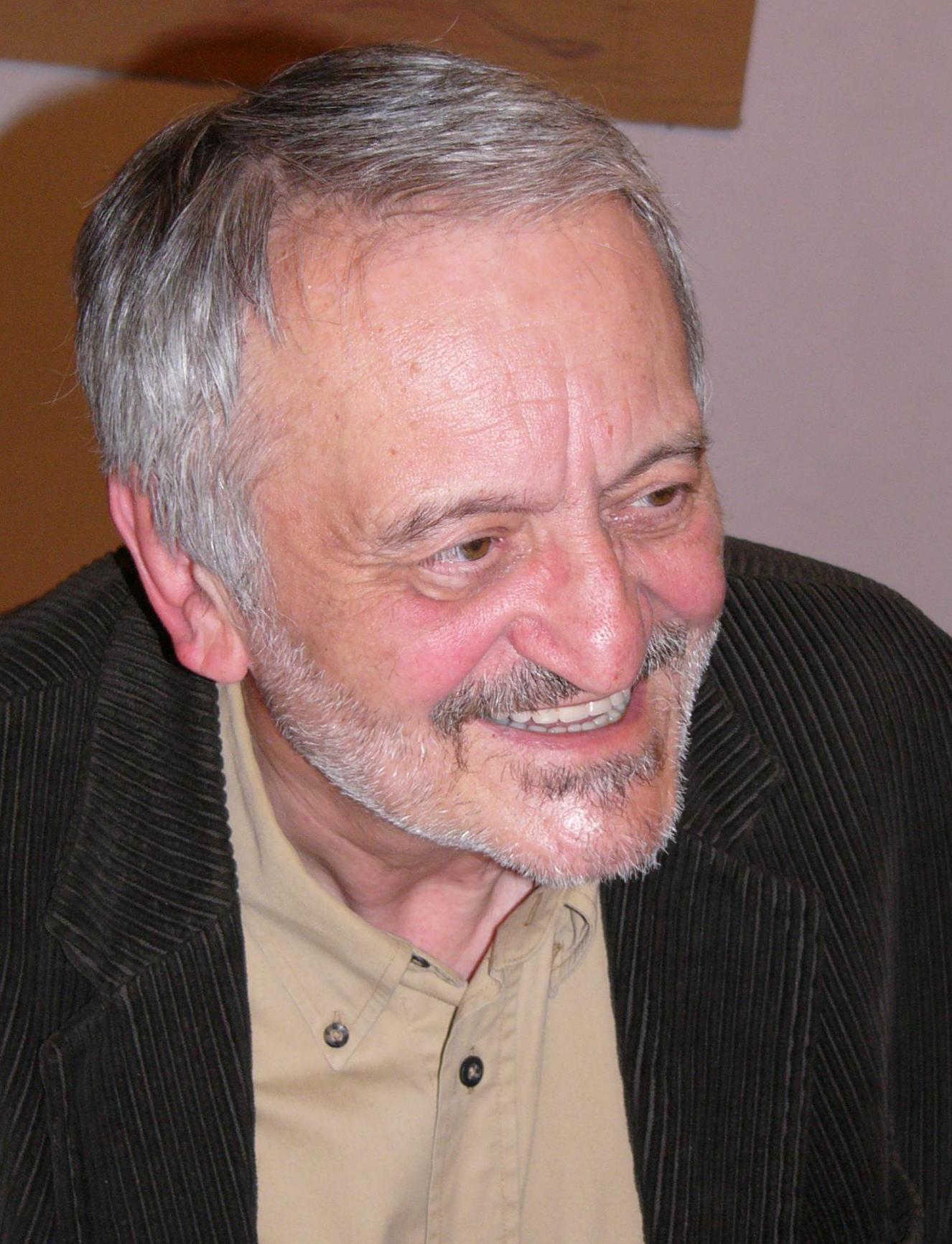
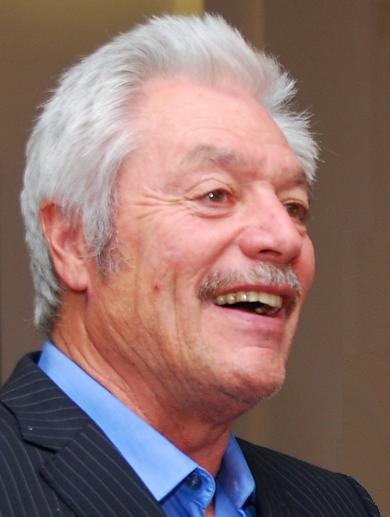
Left to right: Actors Milan Lasica and Juraj Kukura

| Year | Recipient |
|---|---|
| 2000 | ★ Jozef Kroner |
| 2001 | ★ Katarína Kolníková |
| 2002 | ★ Ladislav Chudík |
| 2003 | ★ Eva Krížiková |
| 2004 | ★ Milan Lasica |
| 2005 | ★ Pavol Mikulík |
| 2006 | ★ Mária Kráľovičová |
| 2007 | ★ Karol Machata |
| 2008 | ★ Emília Vášáryová^{Ψ} |
| 2009 | ★ Štefan Kvietik |

=== 2010s ===
| Year | Recipient |
|---|---|
| 2010 | ★ Stanislav Dančiak |
| 2011 | ★ Dušan Gabáni |
| 2012 | ★ Magda Paveleková |
| 2013 | ★ Juraj Kukura |
| 2014 | ★ Marika Gombitová |
| 2015 | ★ Emil Horváth |
| 2016 | ★ Božidara Turzonovová |
| 2017 | ★ Milan Kňažko |
| 2018 | ★ Juraj Jakubisko |

Notes

^{Ψ} Denotes also a winner in one of the main categories.
