= 8th OTO Awards =

8th OTO Awards

March 12, 2008

SND, Bratislava, Slovakia

Overall winner
Petra Polnišová

Hall of Fame
Karol Machata

Život Awards
MafStory
Téma dňa (Special)

◄ 7th | 9th ►

The 8th OTO Awards, honoring the best in Slovak popular culture for the year 2007, took time and place on March 12, 2008, at the former Opera building of the Slovak National Theater in Bratislava. The ceremony broadcast live STV. The hosts of the show were Jan Kraus and Zuzana Fialová.

== Performers ==
- Peter Cmorik, singer
- Peter Dvorský and Adriana Kučerová, opera singers
- Fragile, band
- Jozef Ráž and Ján Baláž
- Štefan Skrúcaný, actor
- Helena Vondráčková, singer

== Winners and nominees ==
=== Main categories ===
Television

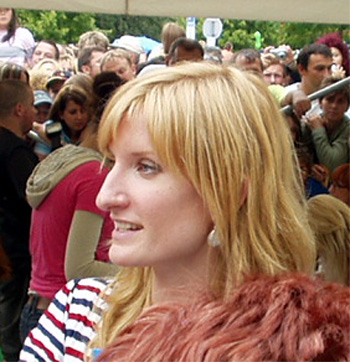
Adela Banášová

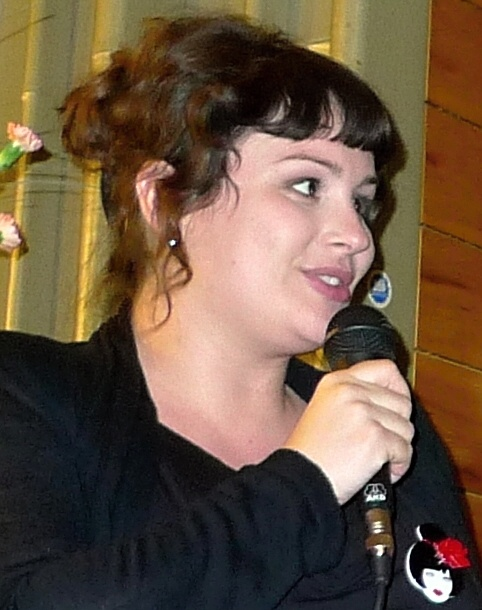
Petra Polnišová

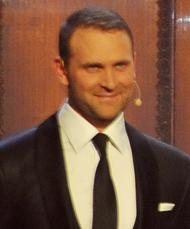

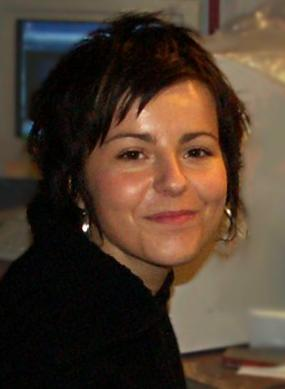
Katarína Knechtová

News Host	Sports Host or Commentator
★ Rastislav Žitný: Zlatica Švajdová; Patrik Švajda	★ Lenka Čviriková (née Hriadelová): Ján Plesník; Jaroslav Zápala
Journalist	Entertainer
★ Zlatica Švajdová (née Puškárová): Daniel Krajcer; Pavol Fejér	★ Adela Banášová: Martin Rausch; Viliam Rozboril
Humorist
★ Petra Polnišová; Peter Batthyany; Elena Vacvalová
Actor	Actress
★ Tomáš Maštalír: Maroš Kramár; Janko Kroner	★ Zuzana Fialová: Zuzana Tlučková; Viktória Ráková
Program	Show
★ Susedia – Markíza: Bailando– Markíza; Slovensko hľadá SuperStar – Markíza	★ Susedia – Markíza: S.O.S.– STV; MafStory – JOJ

Music

Male Singer	Female Singer
★ Mário Kollár: Miroslav Žbirka; Peter Cmorik	★ Katarína Knechtová: Zdenka Predná; Zuzana Smatanová

=== Others ===
Overall winner	★ Petra Polnišová
Hall of Fame	★ Karol Machata
Život Awards	★ MafStory – JOJ
Život Awards	★ Téma dňa – TA3 (Special Achievement)

== Superlatives ==
=== Multiple winners ===
2 awards

- Susedia – Markíza

=== Multiple nominees ===
2 nominations

- Zlatica Švajdová (née Puškárová)
- Susedia – Markíza

== Reception ==
=== TV ratings ===
The show has received a total audience of more than 709,000 viewers, making it the most watched television program within prime time in the region.
