= 7th OTO Awards =

7th OTO Awards

March 14, 2007

SND, Bratislava, Slovakia

Overall winner
Peter Marcin

Hall of Fame
Mária Kráľovičová

EuroTelevízia Award
Najväčšie kriminálne prípady Slovenska

◄ 6th | 8th ►

The 7th OTO Awards, honoring the best in Slovak popular culture for the year 2006, took time and place on March 14, 2007, at the former Opera building of the Slovak National Theater in Bratislava. The ceremony broadcast live STV. The host of the show was Jozef Bednárik.

== Performers ==
- Peter Cmorik, singer
- Marián Čekovský, musician
- Desmod, band
- Karel Gott, singer
- Adriana Kučerová, opera singer
- Dara Rolins, singer
- Martina Schindlerová, singer
- Laci Strike and Street Dance Academy, dancers

== Winners and nominees ==
=== Main categories ===
Television

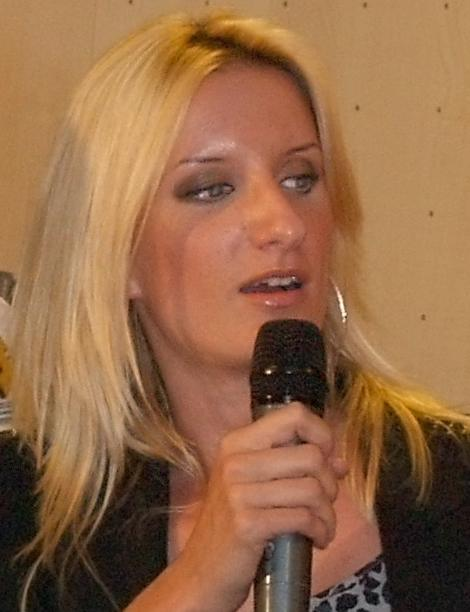
Adela Banášová

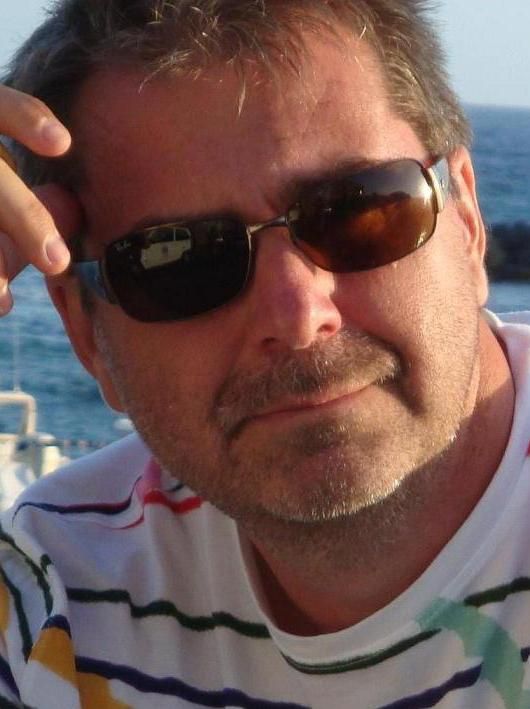
Peter Marcin

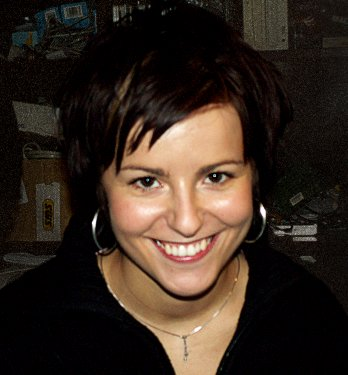
Katarína Knechtová

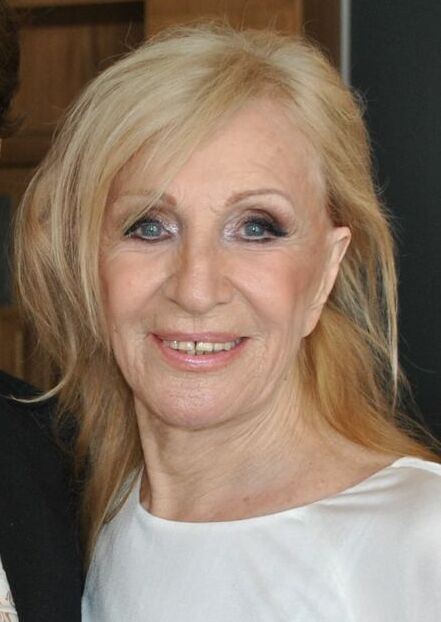
Mária Kráľovičová

News Host	Sports Host or Commentator
★ Martina Šimkovičová (née Bartošíková): Rastislav Žitný; Jarmila Lajčáková (née Hargašová)	★ Lenka Čviriková (née Hriadelová): Jaroslav Zápala; Ján Plesník
Journalist	Entertainer
★ Zlatica Švajdová (née Puškárová): Patrik Herman; Daniel Krajcer	★ Adela Banášová: Viliam Rozboril; Martin Rausch
Humorist
★ Peter Marcin; Petra Polnišová; Andy Kraus
Actor	Actress
★ Janko Kroner: Maroš Kramár; Milan Lasica	★ Zuzana Fialová: Zuzana Tlučková; Viktória Ráková
Program	Show
★ Susedia – Markíza: Let's Dance– Markíza; Pošta pre teba – STV	★ Susedia – Markíza: S.O.S.– STV; Inkognito – JOJ

Music

Male Singer	Female Singer
★ Mário Kollár: Peter Cmorik; Miroslav Žbirka	★ Katarína Knechtová: Zuzana Smatanová; Zdenka Predná

=== Others ===
Overall winner	★ Peter Marcin
Hall of Fame	★ Mária Kráľovičová
EuroTelevízia Award	★ Najväčšie kriminálne prípady Slovenska – STV

== Superlatives ==
=== Multiple winners ===
2 awards

- Susedia – Markíza

=== Multiple nominees ===
2 nominations

- Susedia – Markíza

== Reception ==
=== TV ratings ===
The show has received a total audience of more than 855,000 viewers, making it the most watched television program within prime time in the region.
