= Eva Krížiková =

Slovak actress (1934–2020)

- Born: 15 July 1934; Račišdorf, Czechoslovakia
- Died: 31 March 2020 (aged 85); Malacky, Slovakia
- Other name: Eva Zvaríková (per marriage)
- Education: State Conservatory, Bratislava: * Performing Arts (1949–51) * Professional Theater Course (1951–53)
- Occupations: Actor, presenter, lecturer
- Years active: 1952–2020
- Employer(s): Army Theater, Martin (1953–54); SND, Bratislava (1954–2020)
- Spouse: František Zvarík (1961–2008)
- Children: Ján Zvarík (stepchild); Barbora Zvaríková
- Relatives: Milan Lasica (cousin); Veronika Morávková (grand children)
- Awards: Eva Krížiková awards
- Website: Slovak National Theater

Signature
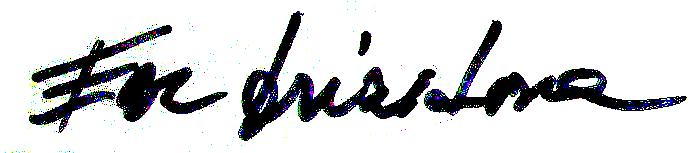

Eva Krížiková (Slovak pronunciation: [ˈeʋa ˈkriːʐikɔʋaː]; 15 July 1934 – 31 March 2020) was a Slovak film and stage actress, often celebrated as one of the greatest entertainers ever in her country of origin and The First Lady of Slovak Humor, respectively. Apart from her cinematic achievements, her name was credited in over five hundred productions made for television.

== Filmography ==
The filmography of Eva Krížiková chronicles her film work through the artist's 60 years as a motion picture actress. She initially entered the film industry through a minor, backup role in Paľo Bielik's work The Mountains Are Stirring from 1952. Her first starring role came shortly after that, in Friday the 13th (1953), also by Bielik. However she has been cast in only eighteen feature films in total, her name has been credited in over five hundred productions made for television, one-hundred-thirty-three of which represent TV films and/or series.

== Awards ==
Year	Nominated work	Award	Category	Result
1972	Yegor Bulychov (as His wife)	Andrej Bagar Awards	Outstanding Performance	Won
1977	Herself	Golden Croc Awards		Won
1978	Raca - My Love (as Darina's mother)	Život Awards	Most Favorite Actress	Won
2001	Seascape (as Nancy)	Jozef Kroner Awards	Outstanding Performance	Won
2001	Herself	Crystal Wing Awards	Theater — Female Actor	Won
2002	Herself	Slovenka Awards	The Woman of the Year	Won
2004	The Grandmother (title role)	RF Miraculous Nut Piešťany	Children's Jury Price	Won
2009	Herself	Karel Čapek Awards		Won
2011	Herself	Slovenka Awards	Art and Culture	Won
Lifetime honors
1976	Herself	Meritorious Artist		Honored
2003	Herself	OTO Awards	Hall of Fame	Honored
2005	Herself	Mayor of Bratislava Awards	Bronze statuette of Roland	Honored
2005	Herself	FAJ Awards	Thalia Flower	Honored
2005	Herself	LitFond Awards	Lifetime work	Honored
2013	Herself	IFFB/Municipality of the Capital City of Slovakia	Film Walk of Fame	Honored
2014	Herself	Pribina Cross	2nd Class	Honored
Note: The years are listed in order of the respective calendar years, annual ceremonies are usually held the next.

== See also ==
- List of Slovak films
- 3rd Czech Lion Awards — Best Design Achievement nomination (V erbu lvice)
- 18th Berlin International Film Festival — Silver Bear Award (L'homme qui ment)
- 42nd Venice International Film Festival — Sergio Trasatti Award (Perinbaba)
