= 12th OTO Awards =

12th OTO Awards

March 9, 2012

SND, Bratislava, Slovakia

Overall winner
Petra Polnišová

Hall of Fame
Dušan Gabáni

Život Award
Jozef Kubáni

◄ 11th | 13th ►

The 12th OTO Awards, honoring the best in Slovak popular culture for the year 2011, took time and place on March 9, 2012 at the Opera of the Slovak National Theater in Bratislava. The ceremony broadcast live RTVS on Jednotka. The hosts of the show were Marián Čekovský and Michal Hudák.

== Winners and nominees ==
=== Main categories ===
Television

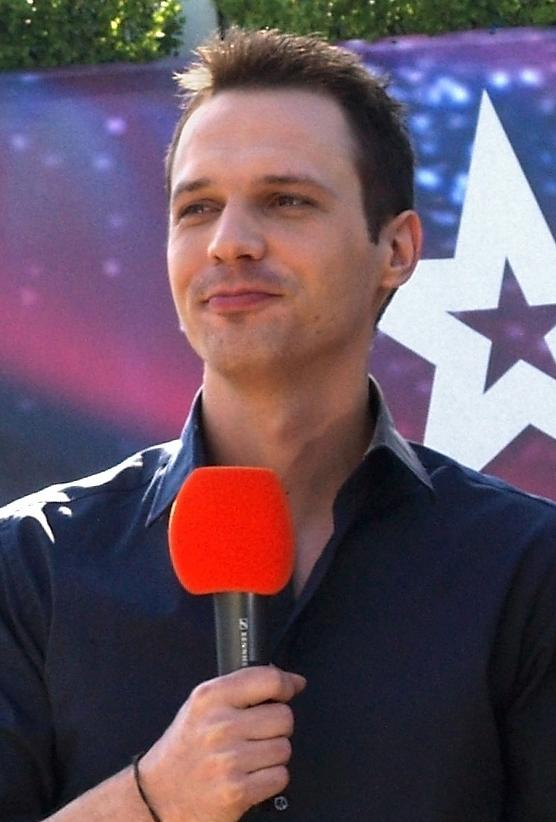
Martin Rausch alias "Pyco"

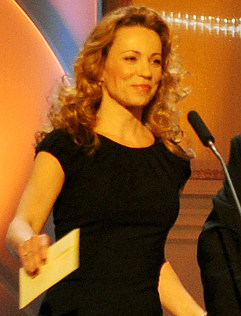
Diana Mórová

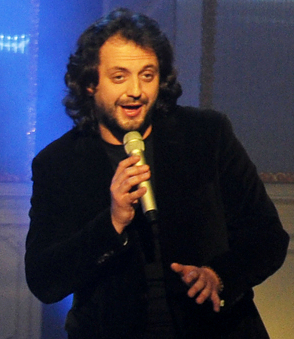
Marián Čekovský

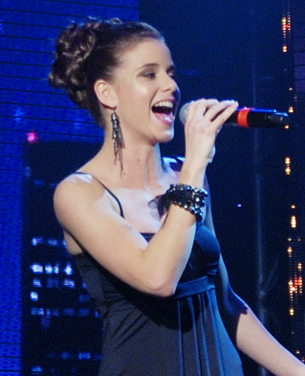
Nela Pocisková

News Host	Sports Host or Commentator
★ Lucia Barmošová: Andrea Pálffy (née Belányiová); Miriam Šmahel (née Kalisová)	★ Peter Varinský: Lenka Čviriková (née Hriadelová); Marcel Merčiak
Journalist	Entertainer
★ Patrik Herman: Zlatica Švajdová (née Puškárová); Erika Barkolová	★ 'Martin Rausch: Viliam Rozboril; Adela Banášová
Drama Actor	Drama Actress
★ Ján Koleník: Roman Luknár; Janko Kroner	★ Diana Mórová: Zuzana Tlučková; Emília Vášáryová
Comedy Actor	Comedy Actress
★ Lukáš Latinák: Ľuboš Kostelný; Alexander Bárta	★ Petra Polnišová: Helena Krajčiová; Monika Hilmerová
Program	Show
★ Srdce pre deti – JOJ: Česko Slovensko má talent – JOJ; Legendy Popu – STV	★ Partička – Markíza: Modré z neba – Markíza; 5 proti 5 – STV
Series
★ Panelák – JOJ; Profesionáli – JOJ; Hoď svišťom – JOJ

Music

Male Singer	Female Singer
★ Marián Čekovský: Mário Kollár; Miroslav Žbirka	★ Nela Pocisková: Zuzana Smatanová; Tina

=== Others ===
Overall winner	★ Petra Polnišová
Hall of Fame	★ Dušan Gabáni
Život Award	★ Jozef Kubáni

== Reception ==
=== TV ratings ===
The show has received a total audience of more than 464,000 viewers, making it the second most watched television program within prime time in the region, yet the lowest rated in the TV poll's history.
