= List of retired OTO Awards =

OTO is a television awards show recognizing the public figures and the work of popular culture in Slovakia.

== Main categories ==
=== TV Announcer ===
OTO Award
TV Announcer

First awarded | Last awarded
2000 | 2002

Year	Recipient	Nominees
2000	★ Soňa Müllerová^{†} (3 consecutive wins)	Miloš Bubán; Alena Heribanová
2001	★ Soňa Müllerová^{†} (3 consecutive wins)	Miloš Bubán; Alena Heribanová
2002	★ Soňa Müllerová^{†} (3 consecutive wins)	Miloš Bubán; Alena Heribanová

=== TV News and Journalism ===
OTO Award
TV News and Journalism

First awarded | Last awarded
2001 | 2003

Year	Recipient	Nominees
2001	★ Daniel Krajcer^{┼} (2 consecutive wins)	Aneta Parišková; Jana Majeská
2002	★ Daniel Krajcer^{┼} (2 consecutive wins)	Aneta Parišková; Jana Majeská
2003	★ Jana Majeská	Branislav Ondruš; Zuzana Hajdu

=== TV Host – Children's Program ===
OTO Award
TV Host – Children's Program

First awarded | Last awarded
2001 | 2004

Year	Recipient	Nominees
2001	★ Jozef Nodžák (4 consecutive wins)	Andrej Bičan; Janko Kroner
2002	★ Jozef Nodžák (4 consecutive wins)	Andrej Bičan; Janko Kroner
2003	★ Jozef Nodžák (4 consecutive wins)	Andrej Bičan; Dorota Nvotová
2004	★ Jozef Nodžák (4 consecutive wins)	Martin Vanek and Igor Adamec; Petra Jurínová

=== TV Sports – Host or Commentator ===
OTO Award
TV Sports – Host or Commentator

First awarded | Last awarded
2003 | 2011

Year	Recipient	Nominees
2003	★ Lenka Čviriková (née Hriadelová)	Ján Plesník; Stanislav Ščepán
2004	★ Martina Šimkovičová^{┼} (née Bartošíková)	Lenka Čviriková; Ján Plesník
2005	★ Martina Šimkovičová^{┼} (née Bartošíková)	Lenka Čviriková; Ján Plesník
2006	★ Lenka Čviriková (4 consecutive wins)	Jaroslav Zápala; Ján Plesník
2007	★ Lenka Čviriková (4 consecutive wins)	Jaroslav Zápala; Ján Plesník
2008	★ Lenka Čviriková (4 consecutive wins)	Peter Čambor; Peter Varinský
2009	★ Lenka Čviriková (4 consecutive wins)	Peter Čambor; Peter Varinský
2010	★ Peter Varinský (2 consecutive wins)	Lenka Čviriková; Ján Plesník
2011	★ Peter Varinský (2 consecutive wins)	Lenka Čviriková; Marcel Merčiak^{†}

=== TV Humorist ===
OTO Award
TV Humorist

First awarded | Last awarded
2006 | 2007

Year	Recipient	Nominees
2006	★ Peter Marcin^{┼†}	Petra Polnišová; Andy Kraus
2007	★ Petra Polnišová^{┼†}	Peter Batthyany; Elena Vacvalová

=== TV Actor – New Artist ===
OTO Award
TV Actor – New Artist

First awarded | Last awarded
2012 | 2013

Year	Recipient	Nominees
2012	★ Ján Jackuliak	Gabriela Marcinková; Zuzana Šebová
2013	★ Marcel Chlpík	Laura Hritzová; Timur Kramár

=== TV Series – Drama | Comedy ===
Notes

^{┼} Denotes also or a winner in two or more of the main categories.
^{†} Denotes also or a winner of the Absolute OTO category.

== Special awards ==
=== EuroTelevízia Award ===
EuroTelevízia Award

First awarded | Last awarded
2003 | 2006

Year	Recipient
2003	★ IQ Test národa – JOJ
2004	★ Dievča za milión – JOJ
2005	★ V politike – TA3
2006	★ Najväčšie kriminálne prípady Slovenska – STV

=== KRAS Award for TV Program Branding ===
KRAS Award
TV Program Branding

First awarded | Last awarded
2008

Year	Recipient	Nominees
2008	★ Vilomeniny – Markíza	Mesto tieňov – Markíza; Profesionáli – JOJ

== Further information ==
- OTO Award for TV Host – Entertainment (presented until 2013)
