= 4th OTO Awards =

4th OTO Awards

January 31, 2004

Reduta, Bratislava, Slovakia

Overall winner
Zdena Studenková

Hall of Fame
Eva Krížiková

EuroTelevízia Award
IQ Test národa

◄ 3rd | 5th ►

The 4th OTO Awards, honoring the best in Slovak popular culture for the year 2003, took time and place on January 31, 2004, at the Reduta concert hall in Bratislava. Unlike the previous editions of the show, the ceremony broadcast live JOJ. The host of the show, for a change, was actor Maroš Kramár.

== Performers ==
- Lenka Filipová, musician
- Jana Kirschner, singer
- Ján Kuric and Vidiek, band
- Martin Maxa, singer
- Misha, singer
- No Name, band
- R.A.D.O., singer

== Winners and nominees ==
=== Main categories ===
Television

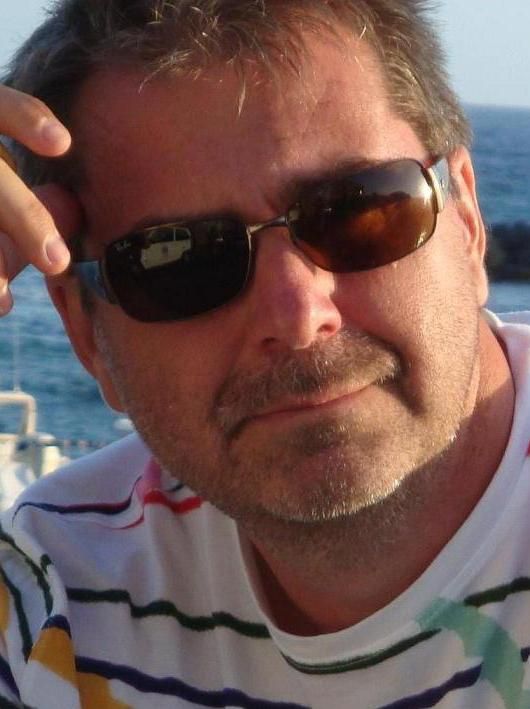
Peter Marcin

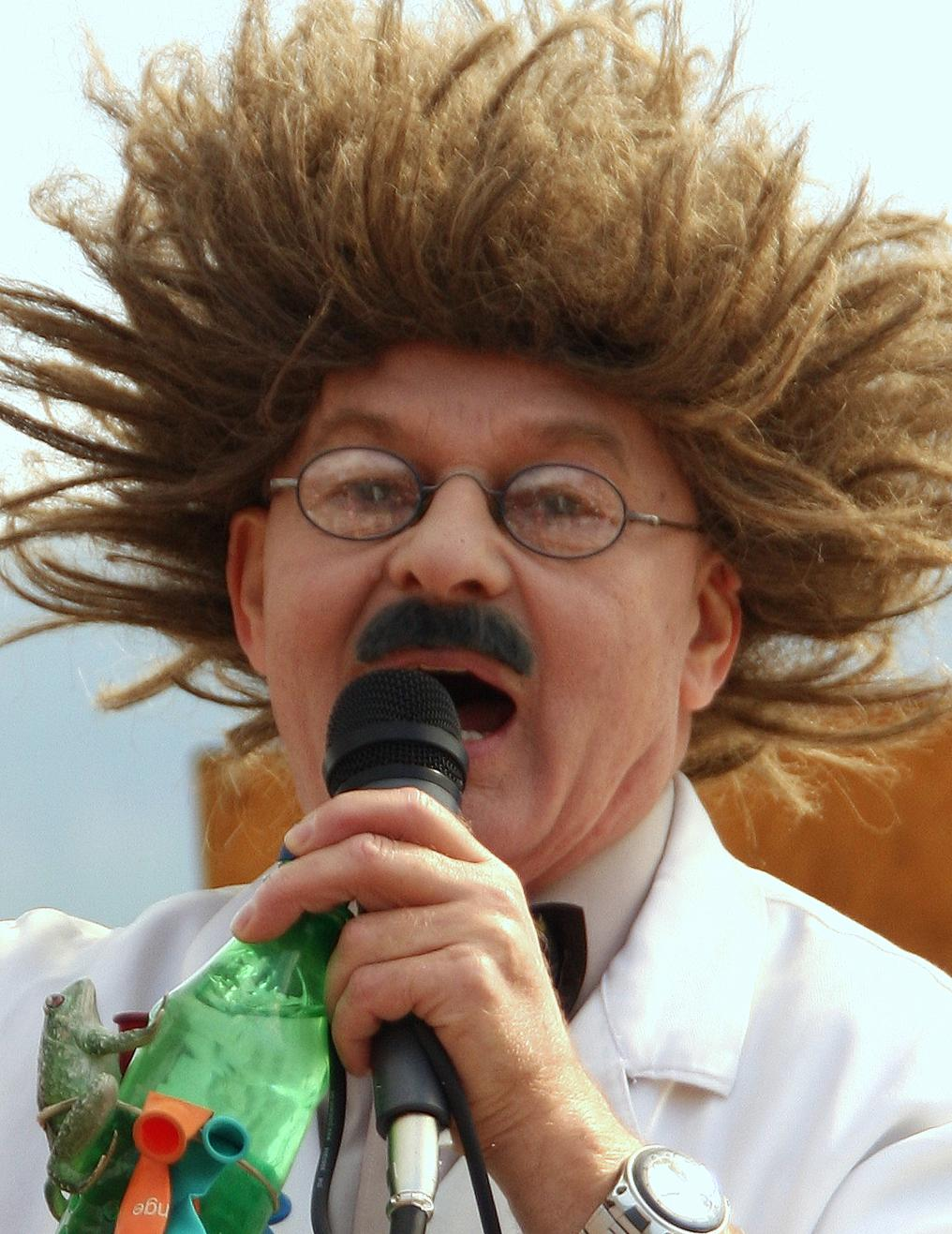
Jozef Nodžák

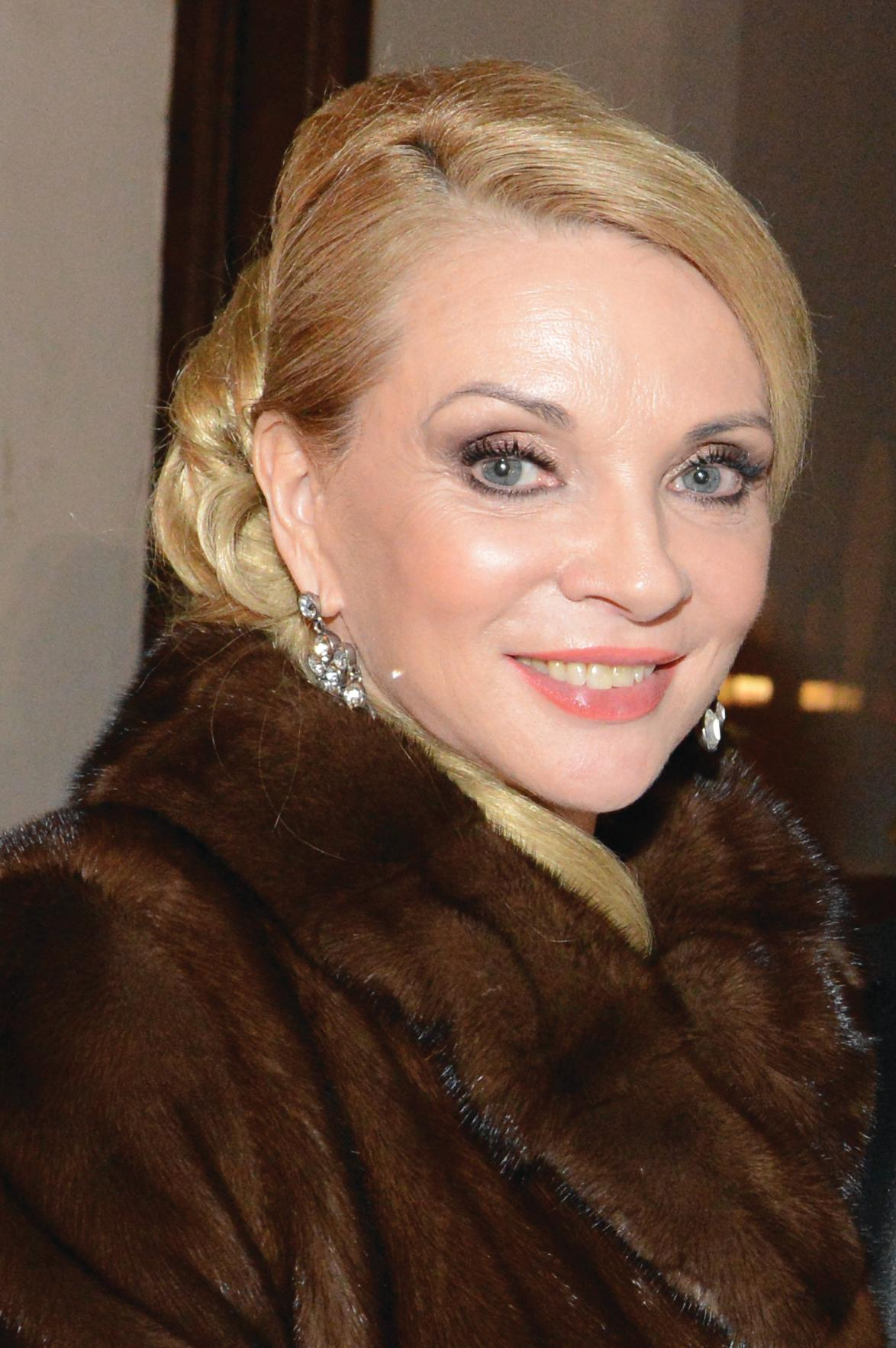
Zdena Studenková

News and Journalism	Sports Host or Commentator
★ Jana Majeská: Branislav Ondruš; Zuzana Hajdu	★ Lenka Čviriková (née Hriadelová): Ján Plesník; Stanislav Ščepán
Entertainer	Children's Program Host
★ Peter Marcin: Magda Paveleková; Peter Kočiš; Vladimír Voštinár	★ Jozef Nodžák: Andrej Bičan; Dorota Nvotová
Actor	Actress
★ Michal Dočolomanský: Maroš Kramár; Emil Horváth	★ Zdena Studenková: Emília Vášáryová; Kamila Magálová
Program
★ Uragán – STV; Inkognito – JOJ; Drišľakoviny – STV

Music

Male Singer	Female Singer
★ Miroslav Žbirka: Ivan Tásler; Richard Müller	★ Misha: Dara Rolins; Jana Kirschner

=== Others ===
Overall winner	★ Zdena Studenková
Hall of Fame	★ Eva Krížiková
EuroTelevízia Award	★ IQ Test národa – JOJ
