= 2nd OTO Awards =

2nd OTO Awards

February 2, 2002

Reduta, Bratislava, Slovakia

Overall winner
Jarmila Hargašová

Hall of Fame
Katarína Kolníková

◄ 1st | 3rd ►

The 2nd OTO Awards, honoring the best in Slovak popular culture for the year 2001, took time and place on February 2, 2002, at Reduta, a Slovak Philharmonic concert hall in Bratislava. As with the first edition of the show, the ceremony broadcast live by STV was hosted by Tibor Hlista.

== Presenters ==
- Andrea Bugošová, TV presenter
- Jozef Golonka, ice hockey coach
- Juraj Jakubisko, film director
- Jarmila Košťová, TV announcer
- Mária Kráľovičová, actress
- Milan Materák, STV managing director
- Eva Máziková, singer
- Bolek Polívka, actor-mime
- Stanislav Ruman, TV Komplet chief editor
- Kristína Svarinská, child actress
- Stanislav Ščepka, theatre artist
- Miroslav Žbirka, musician

== Performers ==
- Petr Muk, singer
- Bolek Polívka and The Backwards, band
- Andrea Zimányiová, singer

== Winners and nominees ==
=== Main categories ===
Television

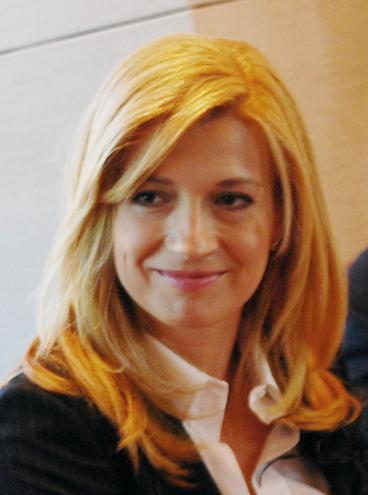
Jarmila Lajčáková

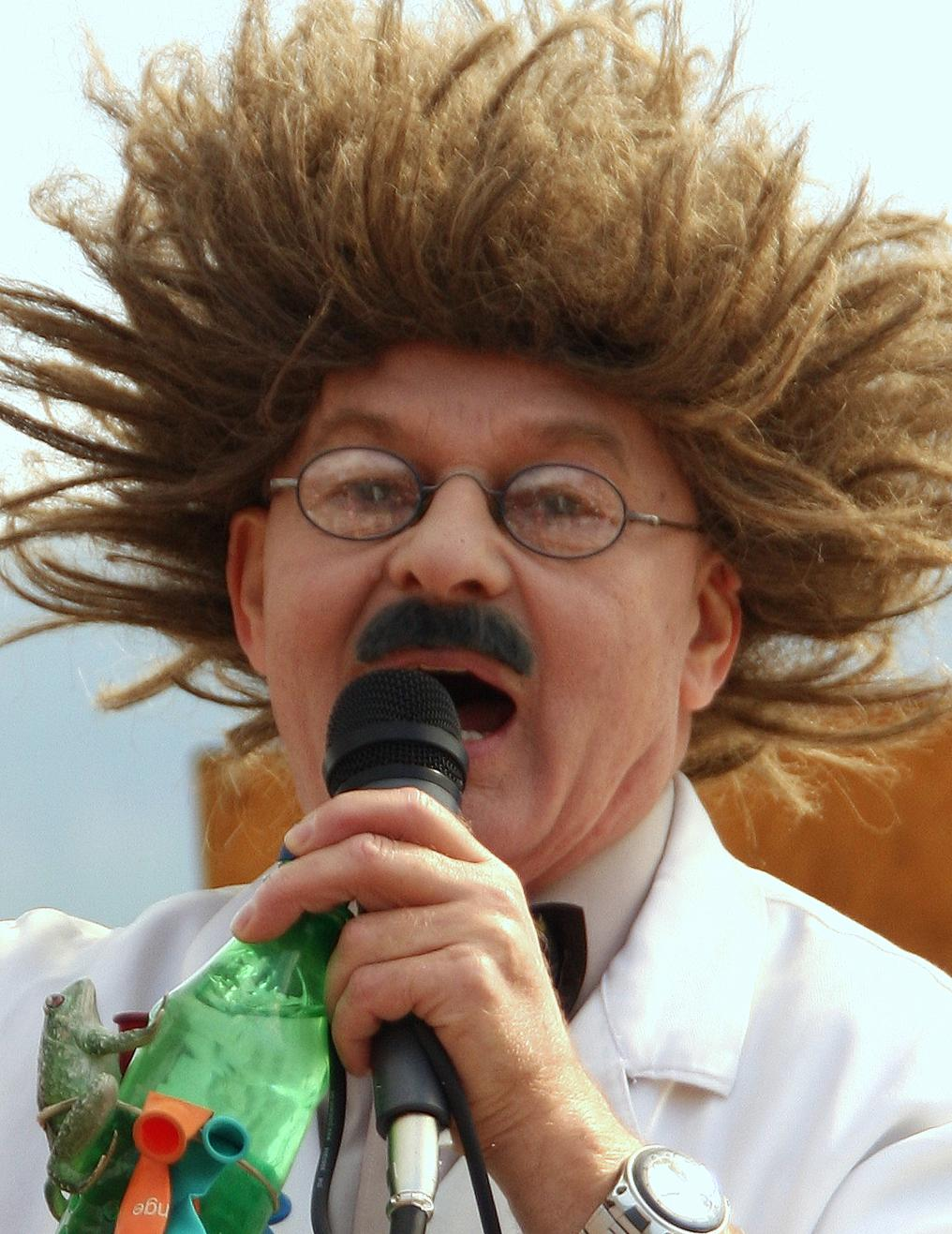
Jozef Nodžák

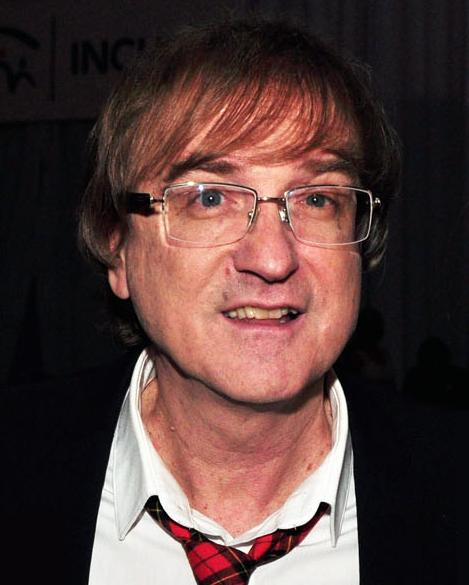
Miroslav Žbirka

News and Journalism	Sports Commentator
★ Daniel Krajcer: Aneta Parišková; Jana Majeská	★ Jarmila Lajčáková (née Hargašová): Stanislav Ščepán; Marcel Merčiak; Miroslav Michalech
Entertainer	Announcer
★ Jozef Pročko: Peter Kočiš; Viliam Rozboril	★ Soňa Müllerová: Alena Heribanová; Miloš Bubán
Children's Program Host
★ Jozef Nodžák; Andrej Bičan; Janko Kroner
Actor	Actress
★ Michal Dočolomanský: Miroslav Noga; Maroš Kramár	★ Zdena Studenková: Anna Šišková; Emília Vášáryová
Program
★ Milionár – Markíza; Večer Milana Markoviča – STV; Dereš – Markíza

Music

Male Singer	Female Singer
★ Miroslav Žbirka: Jozef Ráž; Richard Müller	★ Marika Gombitová: Katarína Hasprová; Jana Kirschner

=== Others ===
Overall winner	★ Jarmila Lajčáková (née Hargašová)
Hall of Fame	★ Katarína Kolníková
