= Absolute OTO Award =

Absolute OTO Award

Currently held by
Adela Banášová

First awarded | Last awarded
2000 | Present

Absolute OTO Award has been annually presented at the Slovak OTO Awards.

== Winners ==
=== 2000s ===
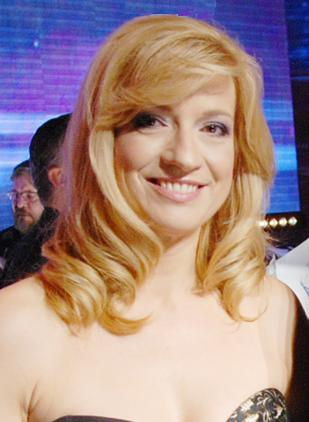
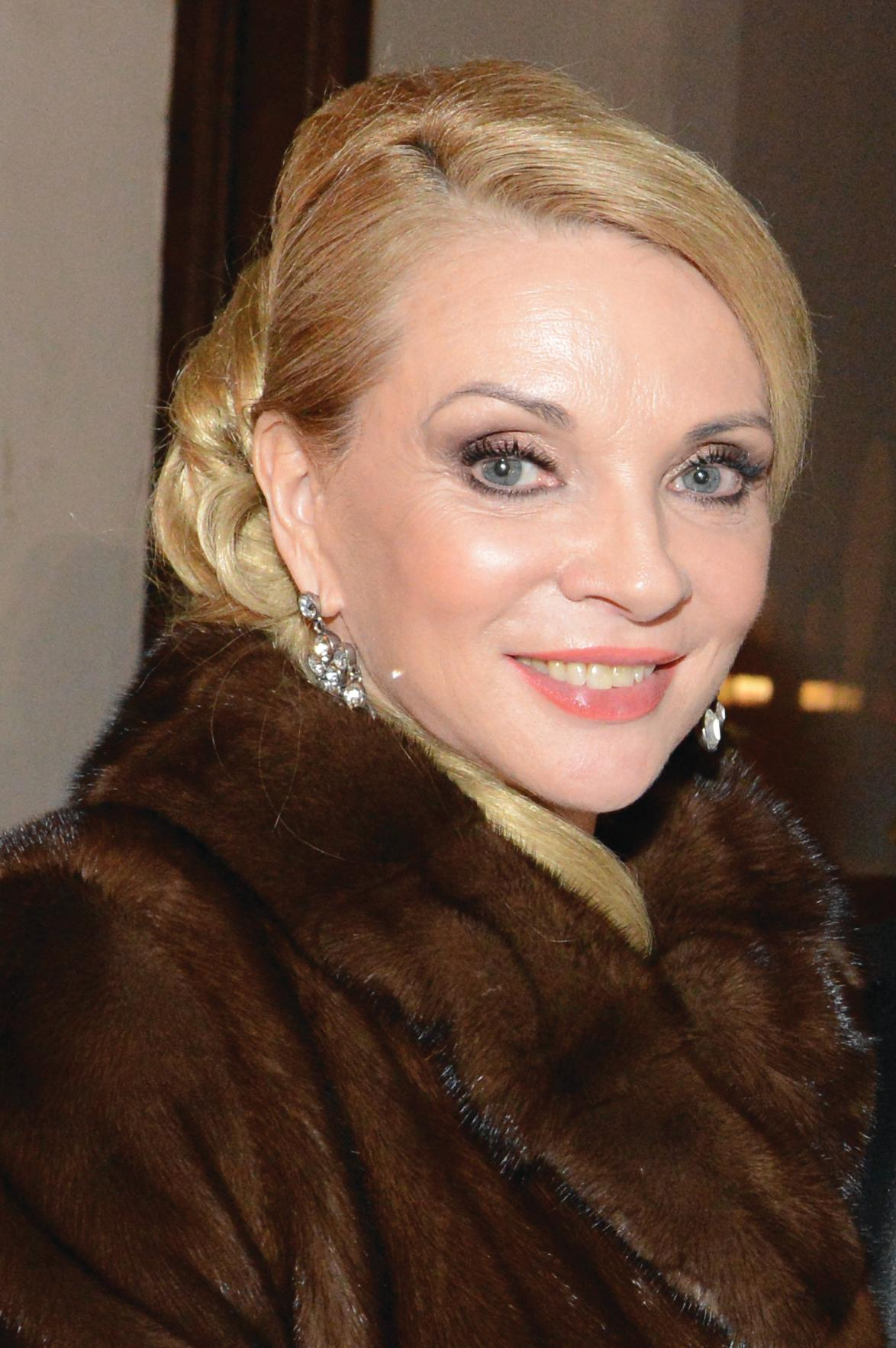
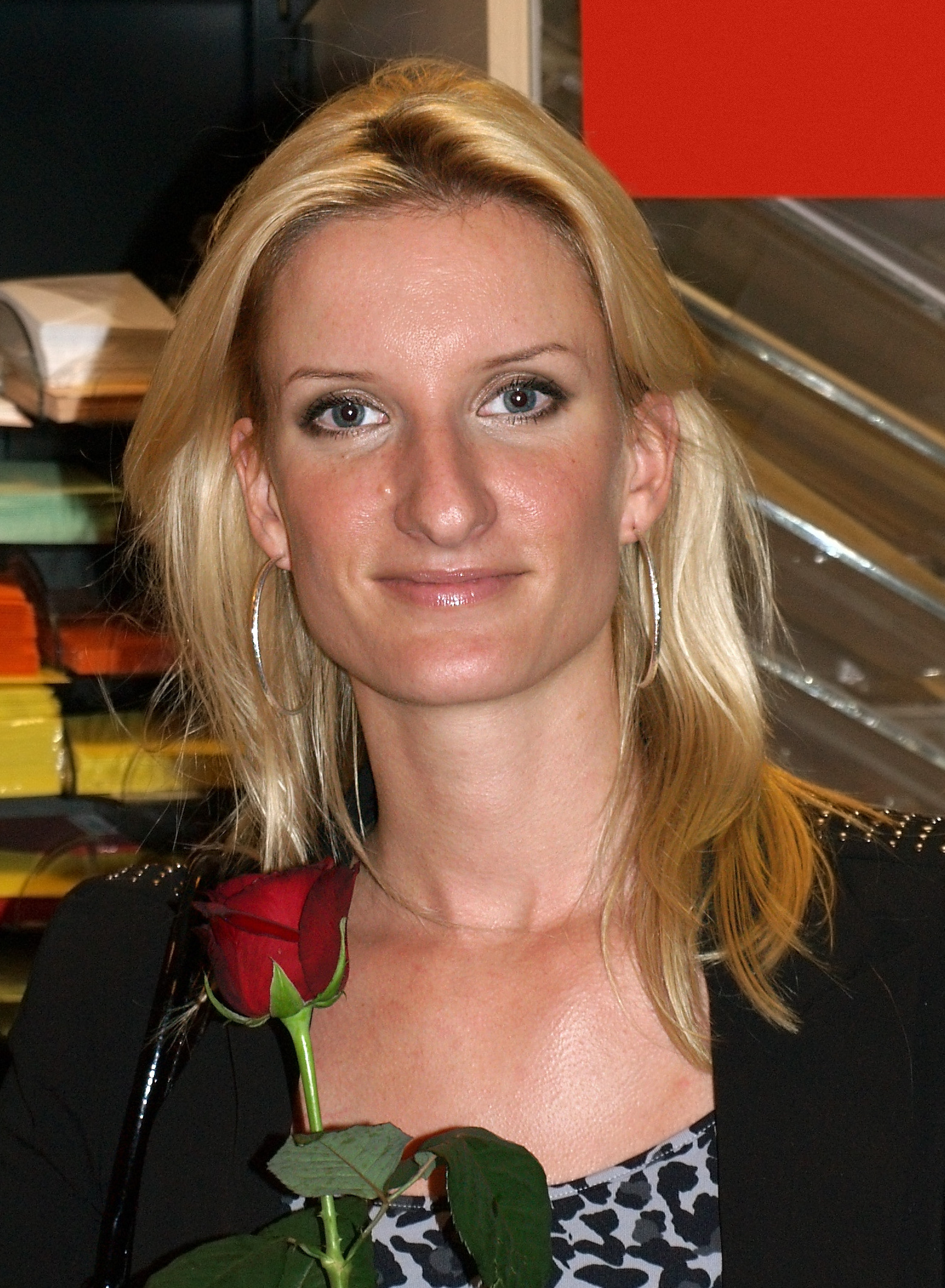
Left to right: TV presenter Adela Banášová has won three seasons of the show, while actress Zdena Studenková and Jarmila Lajčáková (née Hargašová), also a host, have each two times.
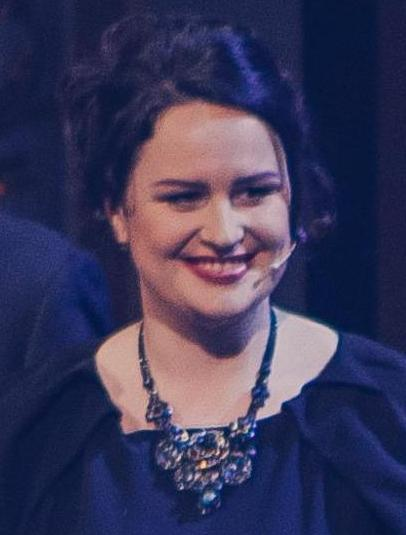
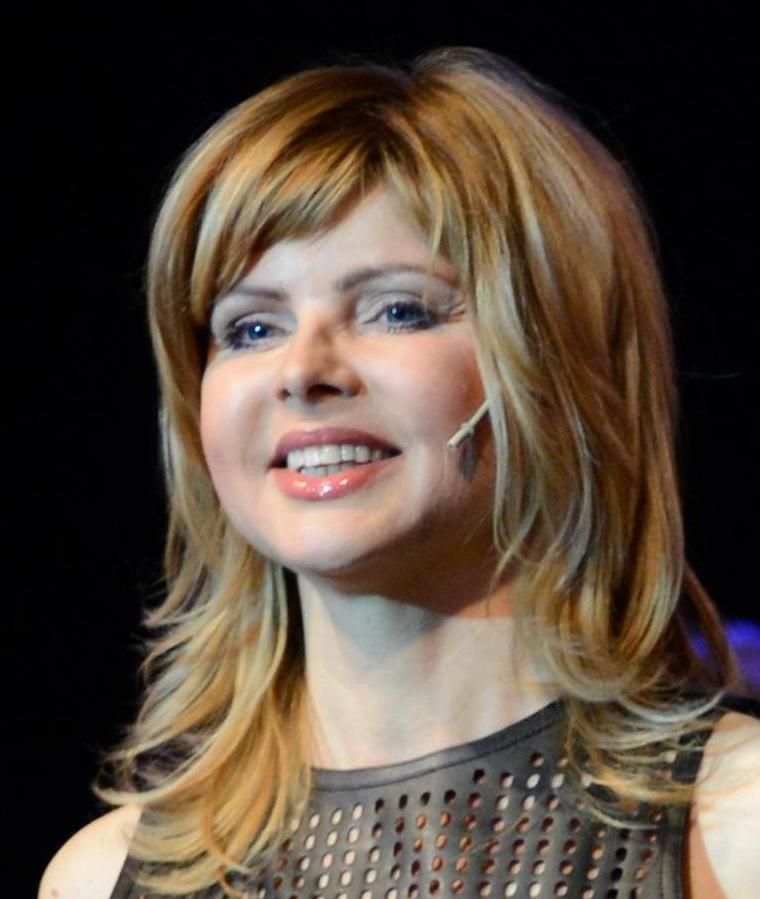
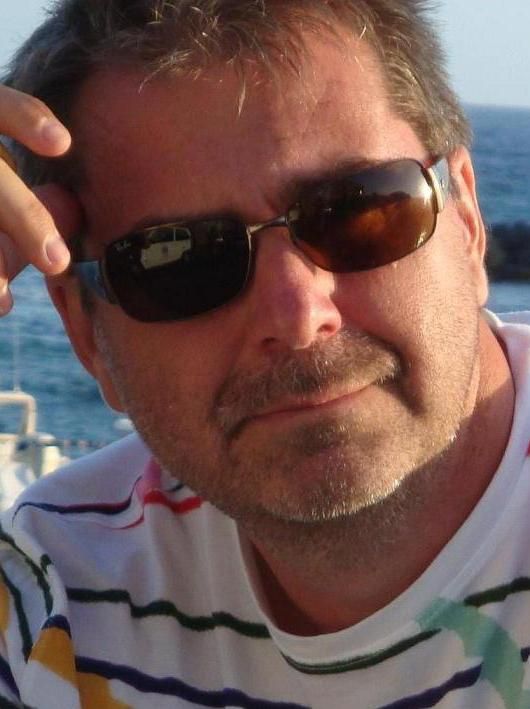
Left to right: While comedian Petra Polnišová is a double winner, TV host Soňa Müllerová and humorist Peter Marcin, these have managed to win once.

Year	Recipient
2000	★ Jarmila Lajčáková^{┼} (2 consecutive wins)
2001	★ Jarmila Lajčáková^{┼} (2 consecutive wins)
2002	★ Soňa Müllerová
2003	★ Zdena Studenková (2 consecutive wins)
2004	★ Zdena Studenková (2 consecutive wins)
2005	★ Maroš Kramár
2006	★ Peter Marcin^{┼}
2007	★ Petra Polnišová^{┼}
2008	★ Mário Kollár
2009	★ Adela Banášová

=== 2010s ===
Year	Recipient
2010	★ Lukáš Latinák^{┼}
2011	★ Petra Polnišová^{┼}
2012	★ Marcel Merčiak^{Ž} (2 consecutive wins)
2013	★ Marcel Merčiak^{Ž} (2 consecutive wins)
2014	★ Adela Banášová (3 consecutive wins)
2015	★ Adela Banášová (3 consecutive wins)
2016	★ Adela Banášová (3 consecutive wins)

Notes

^{┼} Denotes also a winner in two or more of the main categories.
^{Ž} Denotes also a winner of the Život Award.

== Superlatives ==
=== Multiple winners ===
4 awards

- Adela Banášová

2 awards

- Jarmila Lajčáková (née Hargašová)
- Zdena Studenková
- Petra Polnišová
- Marcel Merčiak
