= 3rd OTO Awards =

3rd OTO Awards

February 1, 2003

Reduta, Bratislava, Slovakia

Overall winner
Soňa Müllerová

Hall of Fame
Ladislav Chudík

◄ 2nd | 4th ►

The 3rd OTO Awards, honoring the best in Slovak popular culture for the year 2002, took time and place on February 1, 2003, at the Reduta concert hall in Bratislava. As with the previous editions of the show, the ceremony broadcast live by STV was hosted by Tibor Hlista.

== Presenters ==
- Manuel Bauer, Allianz representative
- Stano Dančiak, actor
- Dana Herrmannová, TV announcer
- Renáta Klačanská, EuroTelevízia chief editor
- Peter Kočiš, actor
- Marcela Laiferová, singer
- Josef Laufer, actor-singer
- Zuzana Neubauerová
- Richard Rybníček, STV managing director
- Božidara Turzonovová, actress
- Pavel Zedníček, actor

== Performers ==
- Hex, group
- Jolana Fogašová, opera singer
- Jana Kirschner, singer
- Josef Laufer, singer
- Ivan Tásler, singer
- Linda Vargová, singer
- Lucie Vondráčková, singer

== Winners and nominees ==
=== Main categories ===
Television

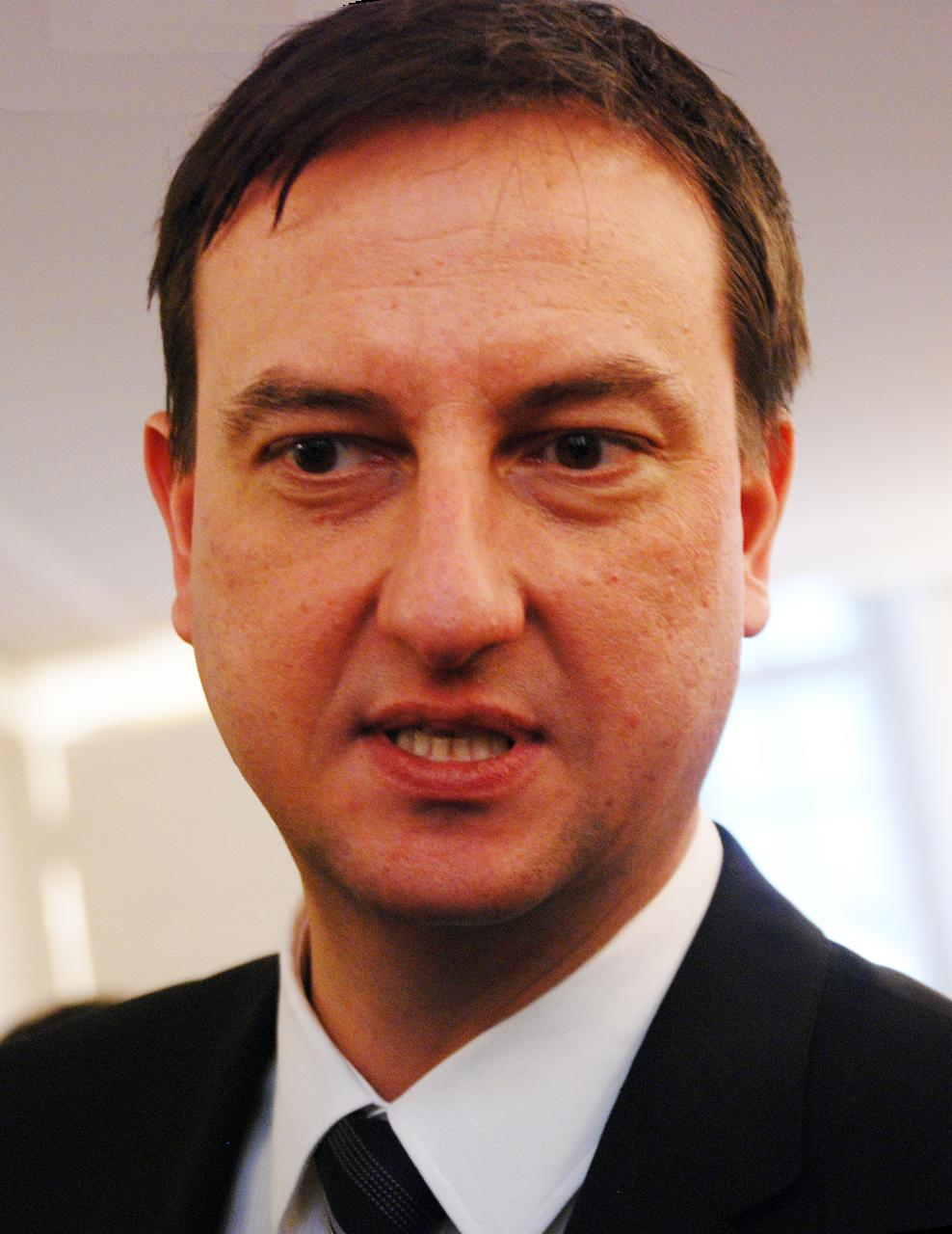
Daniel Krajcer

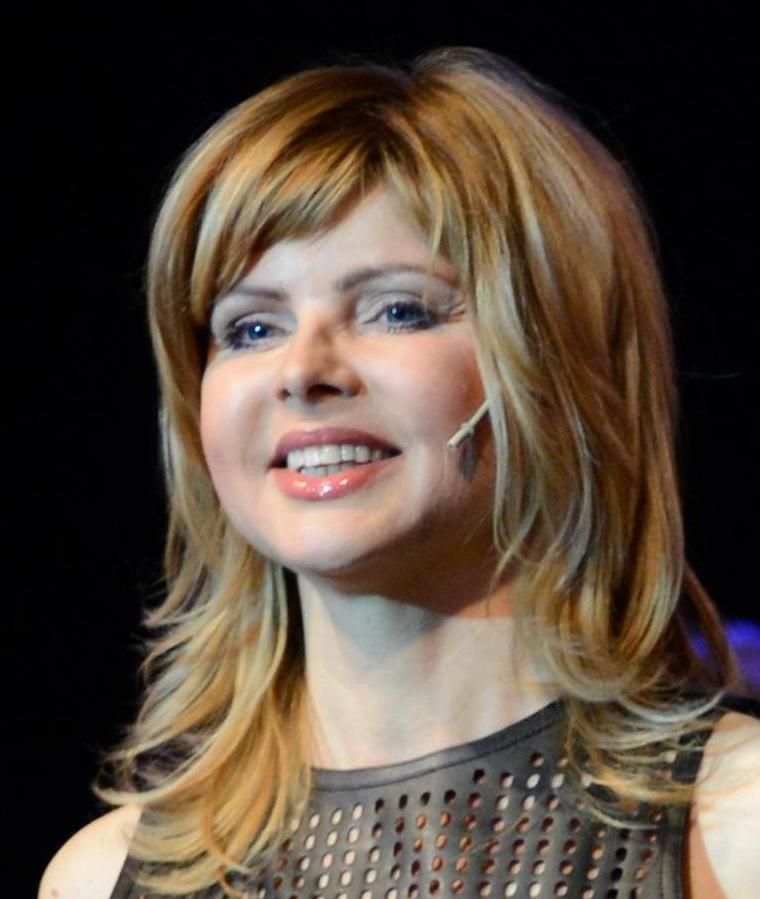
Soňa Müllerová

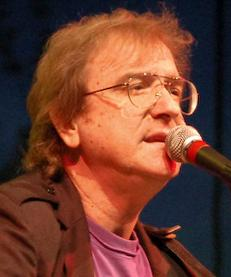
Miroslav Žbirka

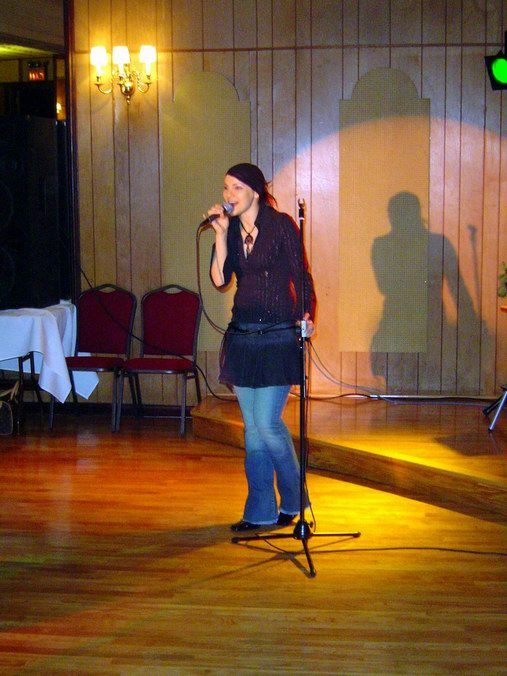
Michaela Paľová alias Misha

News and Journalism	Sports Commentator
★ Daniel Krajcer: Aneta Parišková; Jana Majeská	★ Miroslav Michalech: Ján Plesník; Stanislav Ščepán
Entertainer	Announcer
★ Jozef Pročko: Viliam Rozboril; Elena Vacvalová	★ Soňa Müllerová: Miloš Bubán; Alena Heribanová
Children's Program Host
★ Jozef Nodžák; Janko Kroner; Andrej Bičan
Actor	Actress
★ Július Satinský (In Memoriam): Maroš Kramár; Michal Dočolomanský	★ Zdena Studenková: Kamila Magálová; Emília Vášáryová
Program
★ Je to možné!? – Markíza; Uragán – STV; Dereš – Markíza

Music

Male Singer	Female Singer
★ Miroslav Žbirka: Pavol Habera; Richard Müller	★ Misha: Katarína Hasprová; Jana Kirschner

=== Others ===
Overall winner	★ Soňa Müllerová
Hall of Fame	★ Ladislav Chudík
