= 1st Aurel Awards =

1st Aurel Awards

- March 8, 2002
- Istropolis, Bratislava, Slovakia

Producer
Forza

Broadcaster
Markíza

Lifetime Achievement
Jaroslav Filip

2nd ►

The 1st Aurel Awards, honoring the best in the Slovak music industry for individual achievements for the year of 2001, took time and place on March 2, 2002 at the Istropolis in Bratislava.

== Winners ==
=== Main categories ===
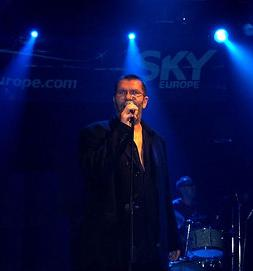
Richard Müller

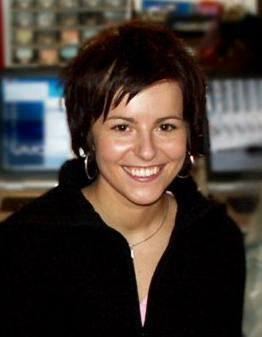
Katarína Knechtová

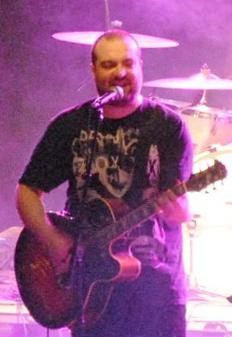
Ivan Tásler

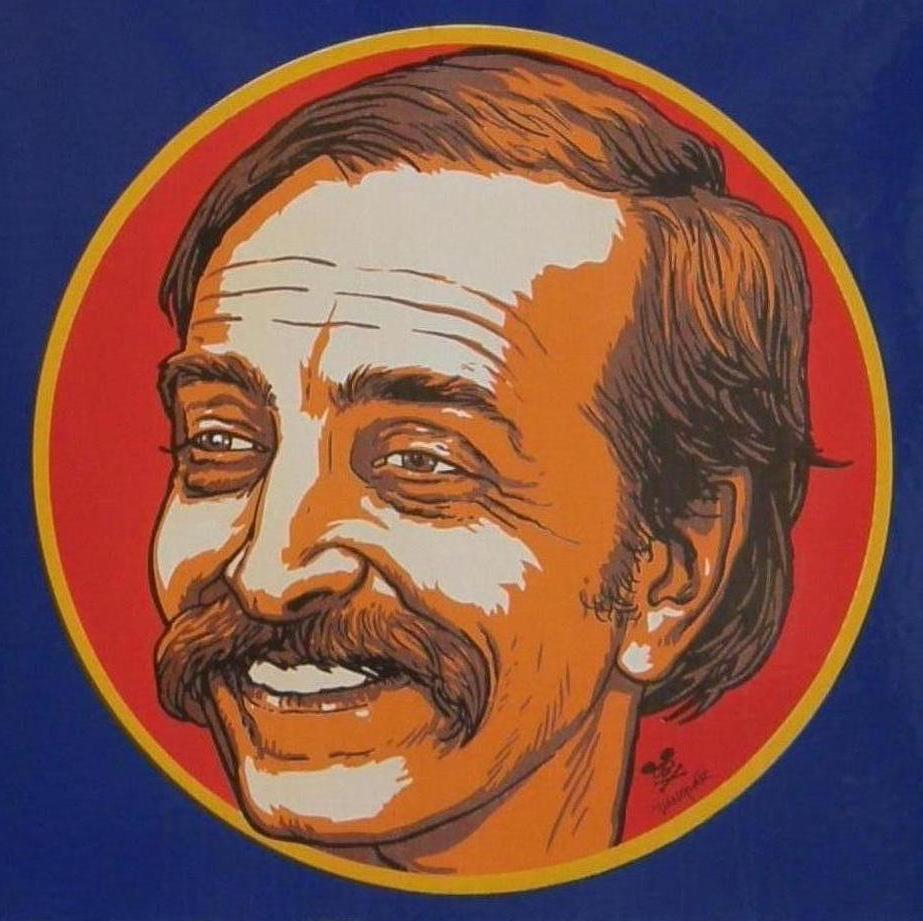
Jaroslav Filip

Best Male Vocal Performance	Best Female Vocal Performance
★ Richard Müller: Peter Lipa; Miroslav Žbirka	★ Katarína Knechtová: Marika Gombitová; Jana Kirschner
Best Ensemble Vocal Performance	Best New Artist
★ Free Faces: Ghymes; No Name	★ Seven Days to Winter: Ears; Jej družina
Best Instrumental Performance	Best Producer
★ Juraj Burian: Andrej Šeban; Henrich Tóth	★ Juraj Bartoš – Ja som optimista (by M. Lasica with Bratislava Hot Serenaders): Peter Graus • Tomáš Zubák – Afternoon (by Seven Days to Winter); Ivan Tásler – '01 (by R. Müller)
Best Record	Best Album
★ Ján Došek • Ján Machút – '01 (by R. Müller): Vladimír Bajnóci – Audiohead (by B3); Ján Došek • Juraj Kupec • Oskar Rósza • Miroslav Širáň – La Belle Epoque (by Free Faces)	★ '01 – Richard Müller: Babylon Hotel – Gladiator; Modrý album – Miroslav Žbirka
Best Cover Art	Best Song
★ La Belle Epoque (by Free Faces) – Bronislava Brtáňová: Jej družina (by Themselves) – Rastislav Andris • Miroslav Béreš; '01 (by R. Müller) – Rastislav Andris • Miroslav Béreš	★ "Nahý II" (by R. Müller) – Richard Müller (lyrics) • Ivan Tásler (music); "Láska" (by Gladiator) – Juraj Babulic; "Ochorel som smútkom belasým" (by Le Payaco) – Le Payaco • Marián Hečko
Best Music Video
★ "Nahý II" (by R. Müller) – Vladimír Struhár "Dobre sa jej padá" (by Ears) – Ján Greguš "Ráno" (by Love 4 Money) – Stanislav Petrov

=== Others ===
Lifetime Achievement	★ Jaroslav Filip (In memoriam)
