= 3rd Aurel Awards =

3rd Aurel Awards

- March 5, 2004
- Istropolis, Bratislava, Slovakia

Producer
Forza

Broadcaster
Markíza

Lifetime Achievement
František Krištof Veselý

◄ 2nd │ 4th ►

The 3rd Aurel Awards, honoring the best in the Slovak music industry for individual achievements for the year of 2003, took time and place on March 5, 2004 at the Istropolis in Bratislava.

== Winners ==
=== Main categories ===
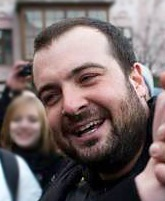
Ivan Tásler of IMT Smile

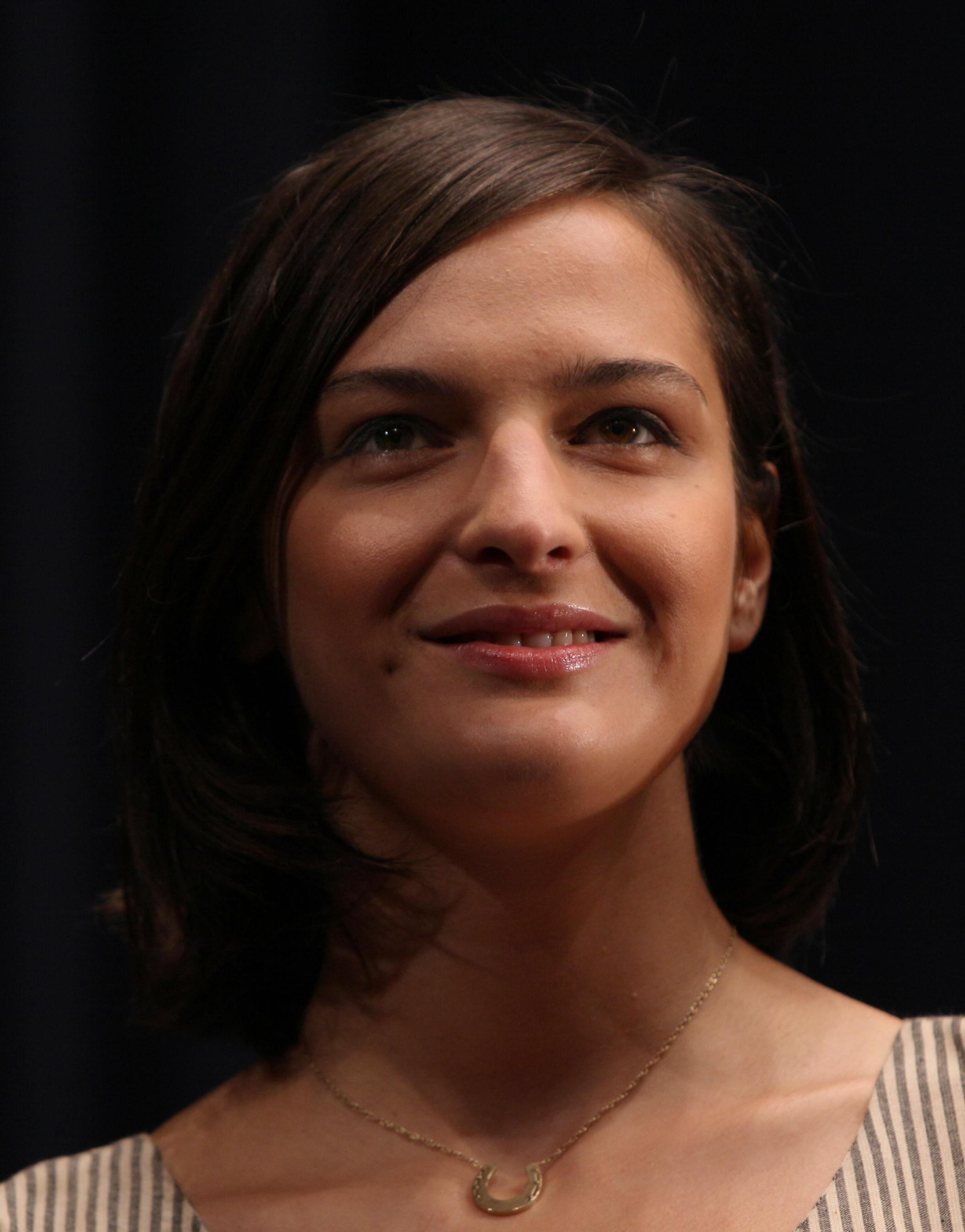
Jana Kirschner

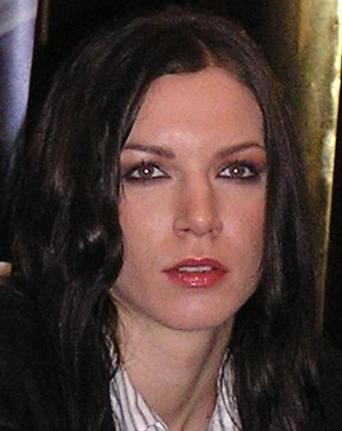
Zuzana Smatanová

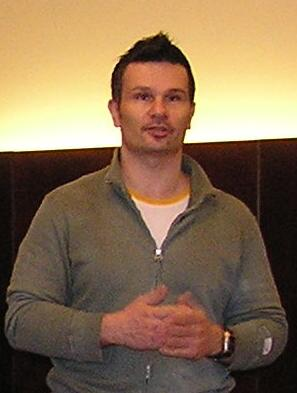
Július "Gajo" Kuruc

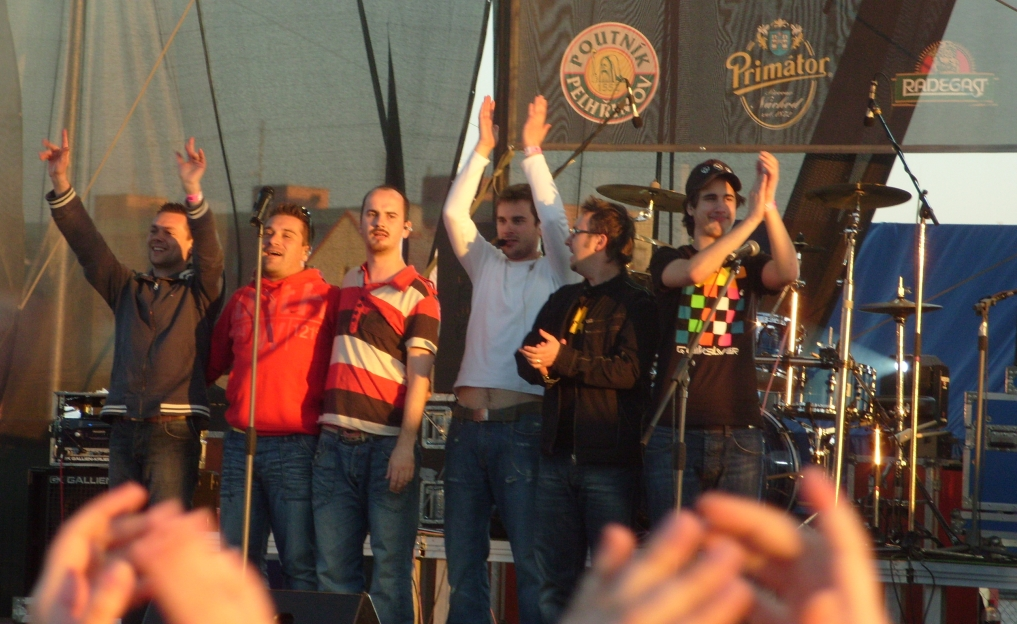
No Name

Best Male Vocal Performance	Best Female Vocal Performance
★ Ivan Tásler: Miroslav Žbirka; Mário Kollár	★ Jana Kirschner: Katarína Knechtová; Zuzana Smatanová
Best Ensemble Vocal Performance	Best New Artist
★ IMT Smile: Desmod; No Name	★ Zuzana Smatanová: Chiki liki tu-a; Veneer
Best Instrumental Performance	Best Producer
★ Erich Boboš Procházka: Peter Bič; Marcel Buntaj; Oskar Rózsa	★ Juraj Kupec • Július Kuruc – "Vráť trochu lásky medzi nás" (by G8): Maroš Hečko – Na československom žúre (by Wedding Band); Oskar Rózsa – ...grooved (by Erich Boboš Procházka & The Frozen Dozen)
Best Record	Best Album
★ Juraj Kupec – Veci čo sa dejú (by J. Kirschner): Ján Došek – IMT Smile (by Themselves); Milan Tököly – Short Stories (by Barflies)	★ IMT Smile – Themselves: Light – Veneer; Veci čo sa dejú – Jana Kirschner
Best Cover Art	Best Song
★ High Voltage Resistance (by Home Made Mutant) – Bronislava Brtáňová: Choďťe sa hrať pred vlastný vchod (by Chiki liki tu-a) – Igor Derevenec; Experiment (by Peha) – Martin Migaš • Jaroslav Vaľko; Derylov svet (by Desmod) – Branislav Ivanič • Michal Tankovič	★ "Na čiernom koni" (by Herself) – Jana Kirschner (music and lyrics) • Martin Wittgruber (lyrics); "2 líšky" – Richard Müller (lyrics) • Ivan Tásler (music); "Kým stúpa dym" (by IMT Smile) – Vladimír Krausz (lyrics) • I. Tásler (music); "Láska moja" (by Elán) – Boris Filan (lyrics) • Václav Patejdl (music); "Naoko spím" (by Peha) – V. Krausz (lyrics) • Katarína Knechtová (music)
Best Music Video
★ "Prvá" (by No Name) – Marek Kuboš • Juraj Lehotský "Posledná" (by Desmod) – Michal Kožuch "Vráť trochu lásky medzi nás" (by G8) – Vladimír Balko "Zostať smieš (Nize & Slow)" (by Helicó featuring Dara Rolins) – Martin Štelbaský

=== Others ===
Lifetime Achievement	★ František Krištof Veselý
