= OTO Award for Male Singer =

Slovak music award

OTO Award
Male Singer

Currently held by
Adam Ďurica

First awarded | Last awarded
2000 | Present

OTO Award for Male Singer has been annually presented in Slovakia from 2000.

== Winners and nominees ==
=== 2000s ===
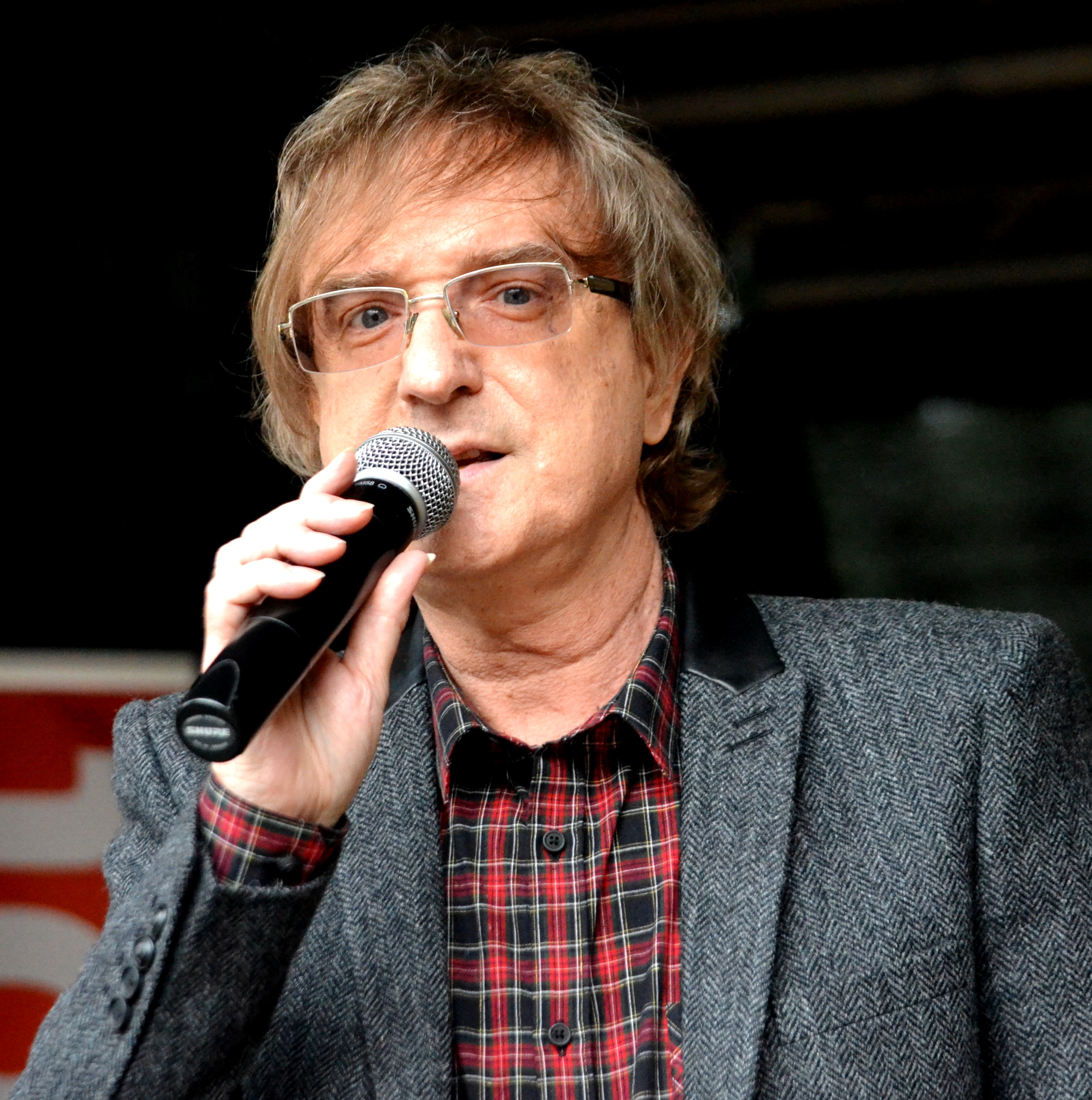
Having won seven times out of fifteen, Miroslav Žbirka is the leader among singers.

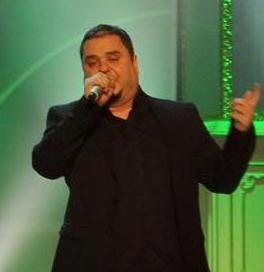
With seven nominations including five wins, Mário Kollár alias "Kully" follows second.

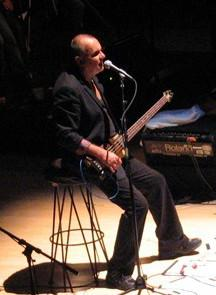
Jozef Ráž of Elán band has earned one trophy himself, have been a triple nominee.

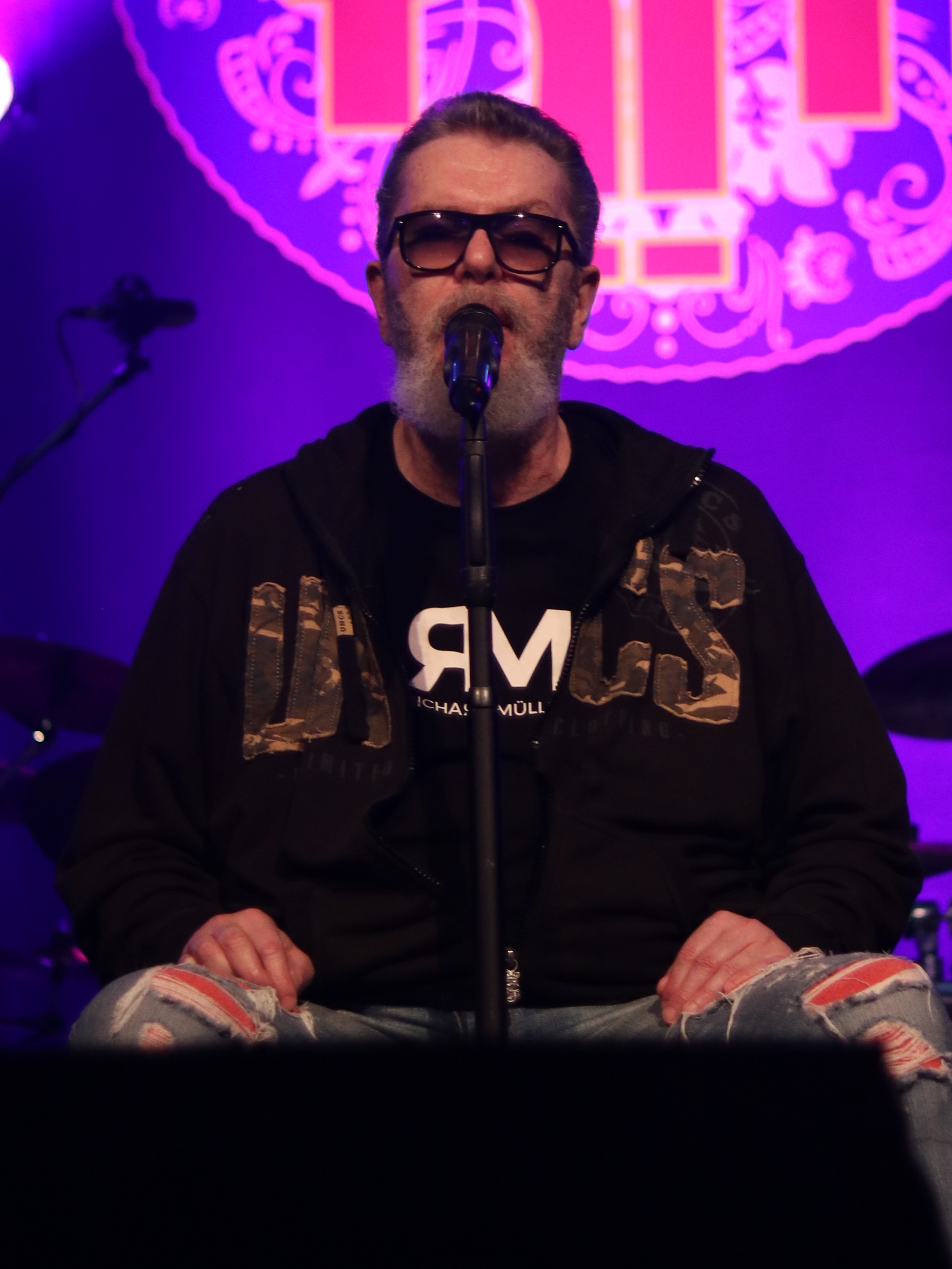
Richard Müller of Banket has secured six nominations.

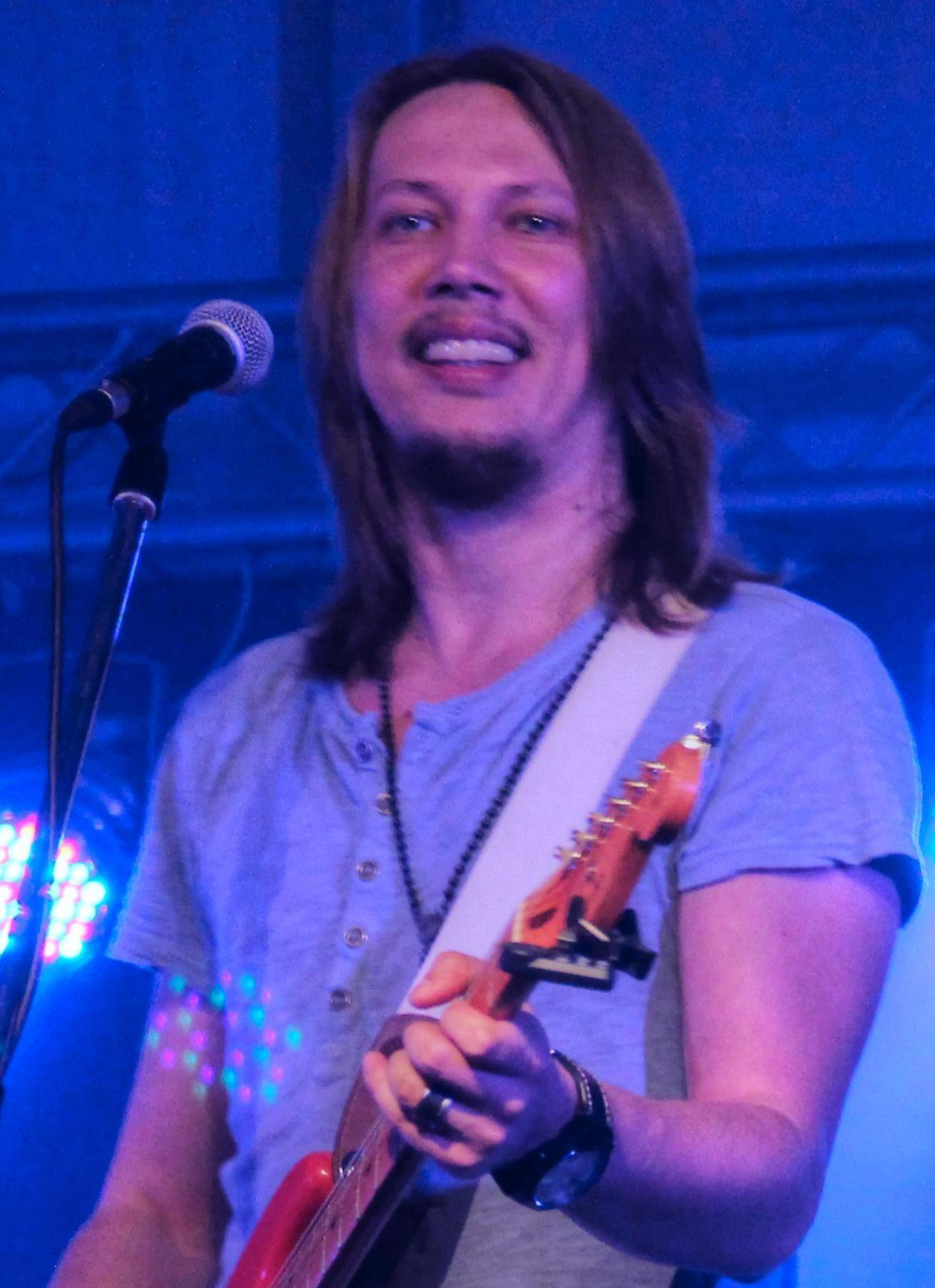
Peter Cmorik has scored four nominating bids at least.

Year	Recipient	Nominees
2000	★ Jozef Ráž	Pavol Habera; Richard Müller
2001	★ Miroslav Žbirka (5 consecutive wins)	Jozef Ráž; Richard Müller
2002	★ Miroslav Žbirka (5 consecutive wins)	Pavol Habera; Richard Müller
2003	★ Miroslav Žbirka (5 consecutive wins)	Ivan Tásler; Richard Müller
2004	★ Miroslav Žbirka (5 consecutive wins)	Pavol Habera; Ivan Tásler
2005	★ Miroslav Žbirka (5 consecutive wins)	Richard Müller; Jozef Ráž
2006	★ Mário Kollár (5 consecutive wins)	Peter Cmorik; Miroslav Žbirka
2007	★ Mário Kollár (5 consecutive wins)	Peter Cmorik; Miroslav Žbirka
2008	★ Mário Kollár (5 consecutive wins)	Peter Cmorik; Miroslav Žbirka
2009	★ Mário Kollár (5 consecutive wins)	Peter Cmorik; Miroslav Žbirka

=== 2010s ===
Year	Recipient	Nominees
2010	(See above)	Miroslav Žbirka; Richard Müller
2011	★ Marián Čekovský	Mário Kollár; Miroslav Žbirka
2012	★ Miroslav Žbirka (2 consecutive wins)	Marián Čekovský; Ego
2013	★ Miroslav Žbirka (2 consecutive wins)	Marián Čekovský; Mário Kollár
2014	★ Adam Ďurica (3 consecutive wins)	Marián Čekovský; Miroslav Žbirka
2015	★ Adam Ďurica (3 consecutive wins)	Samuel Tomeček; Miroslav Žbirka
2016	★ Adam Ďurica (3 consecutive wins)	Samuel Tomeček; Miroslav Žbirka

== Superlatives ==
=== Multiple winners ===
7 awards

- Miroslav Žbirka

5 awards

- Mário Kollár^{†}

3 awards

- Adam Ďurica

=== Multiple nominees ===
16 nominations

- Miroslav Žbirka

7 nominations

- Mário Kollár^{†}

6 nominations

- Richard Müller

4 nominations

- Peter Cmorik
- Marián Čekovský

3 nominations

- Jozef Ráž
- Pavol Habera
- Adam Ďurica

2 nominations

- Ivan Tásler
- Samuel Tomeček

Notes

^{†} Denotes also a winner of the Absolute OTO category.
