= 2nd Aurel Awards =

2nd Aurel Awards

- March 7, 2003
- Istropolis, Bratislava, Slovakia

Producer
Forza

Broadcaster
Markíza

Lifetime Achievement
Marián Varga

◄ 1st │ 3rd ►

The 2nd Aurel Awards, honoring the best in the Slovak music industry for individual achievements for the year of 2002, took time and place on March 7, 2003, at the Istropolis in Bratislava.

== Winners ==
=== Main categories ===
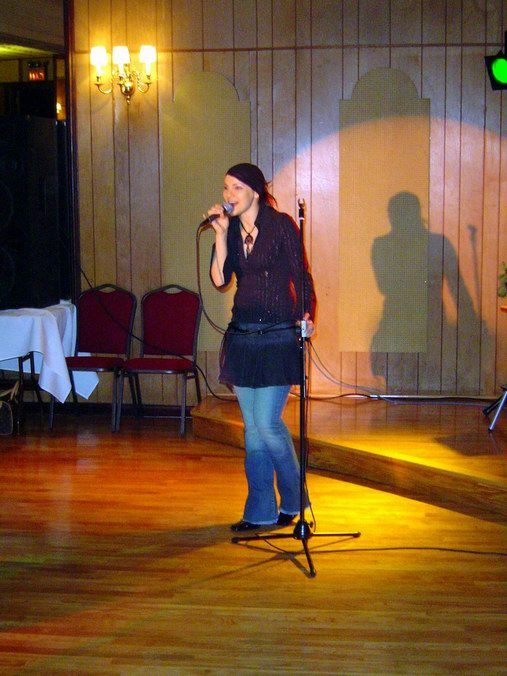
Misha

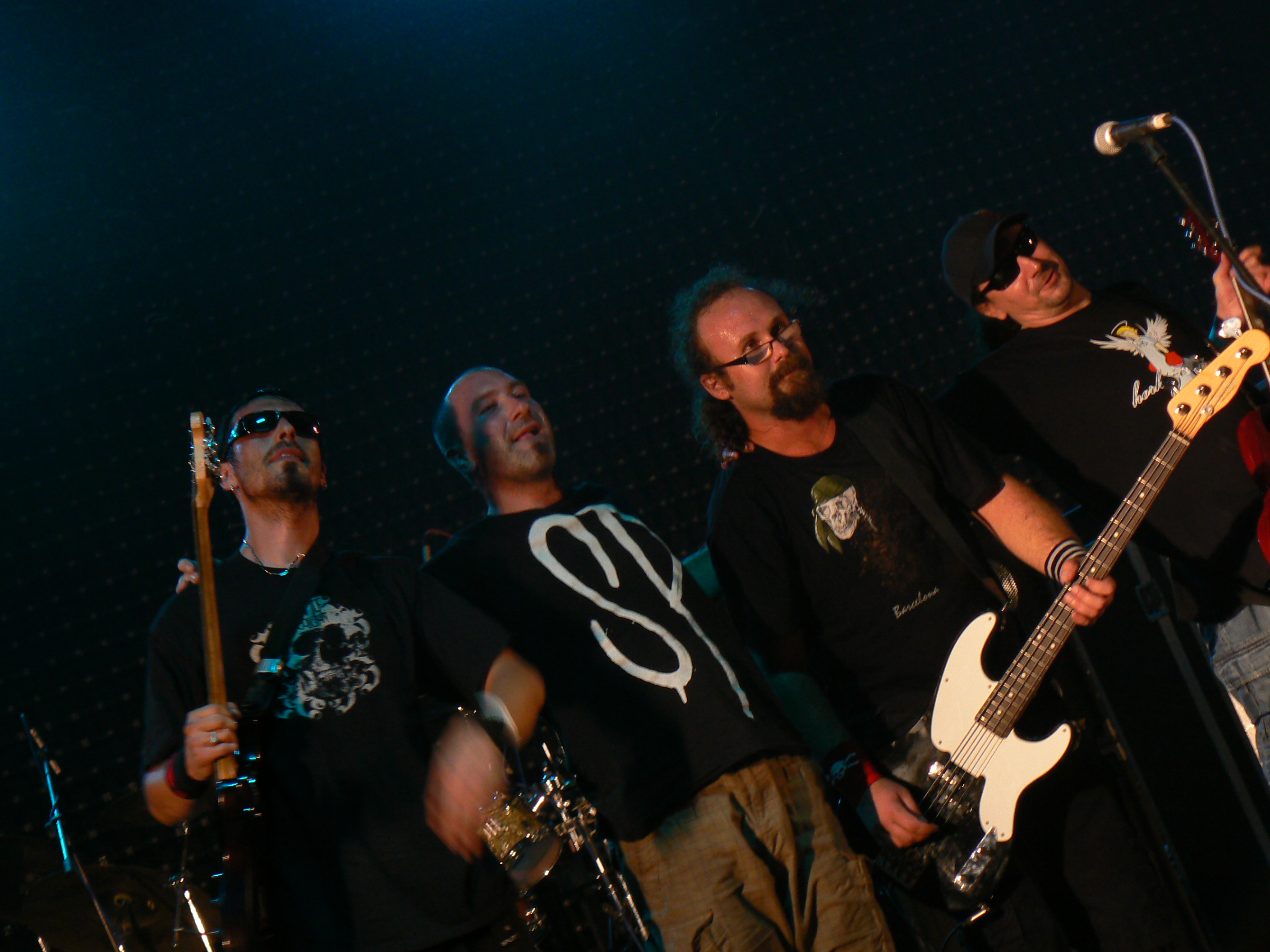
Horkýže Slíže

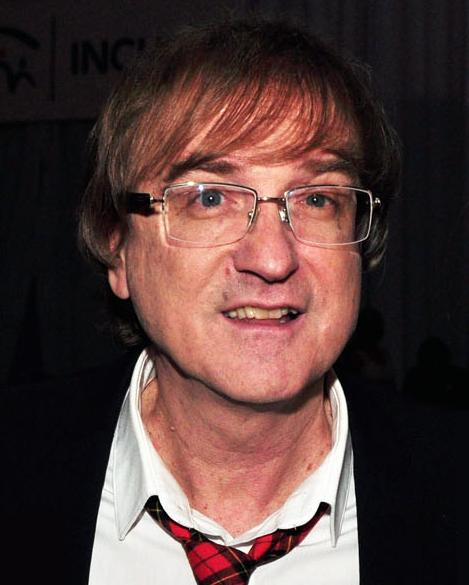
Miroslav Žbirka

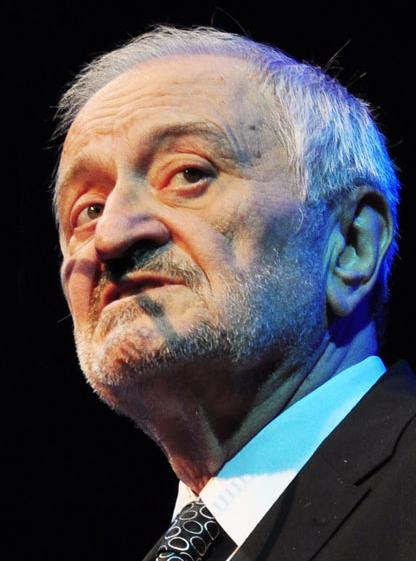
Milan Lasica

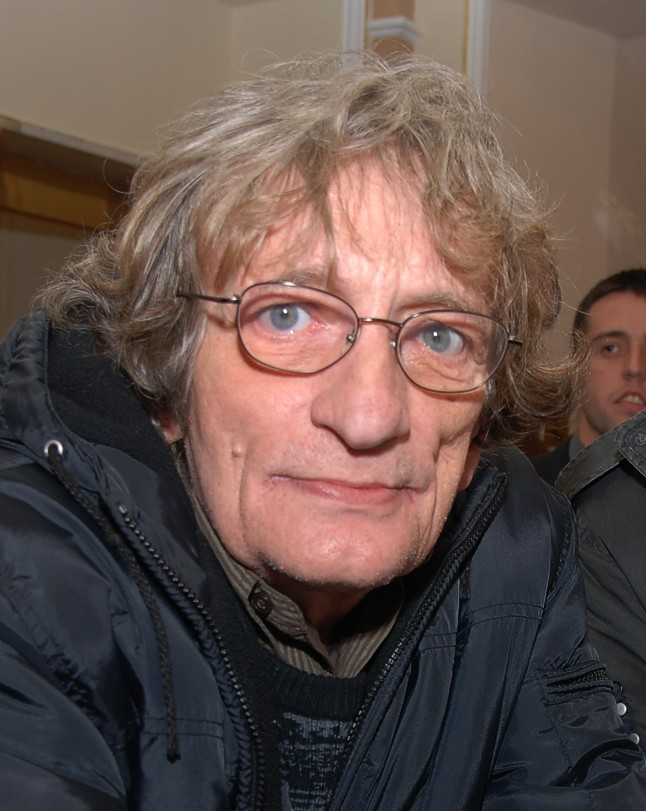
Marián Varga

Best Male Vocal Performance	Best Female Vocal Performance
★ Richard Müller: Karol Mikloš; Ivan Tásler	★ Misha: Jana Kirschner; Lucia Šoralová
Best Ensemble Vocal Performance	Best New Artist
★ Horkýže Slíže: Hex; Polemic	★ Misha: Chill on the Sun; Shellwoy
Best Instrumental Performance	Best Producer
★ Juraj Bartoš: Marcel Buntaj; Gabriel Jonáš	★ Marián Kachút – Colors in My Life (by Misha): Juraj Bartoš – Celý svet sa mračí (by M. Lasica with Bratislava Hot Serenaders); Oskar Rózsa – Tásler (by I. Tásler)
Best Record	Best Album
★ Juraj Kupec – Pelikán (by J. Kirschner): Vladimír Bajnóci – Colors in My Life (by Misha); Richard Fičor – Celý svet sa mračí (by M. Lasica with Bratislava Hot Serenaders)	★ Colors in My Life – Misha: Pelikán – Jana Kirschner; Tásler – Ivan Tásler
Best Cover Art	Best Song
★ Retro (by Müller) – Slavomír Gibej • Richard Müller: Na slovenskej svadbe I (by Wedding Band) – Bronislava Brtáňová; Ďalšia o láske (by M. Železňák) – František Guldan	★ "Co bolí to přebolí" (by M. Žbirka, Martha) – Kamil Peteraj (lyrics) • Miroslav Žbirka (music); "Len tebe" – Ivan Tásler; "Náladu mi dvíhaš" (by Herself) – Misha (lyrics) • Marián Kachút and Misha (music)
Best Music Video
★ "Skôr než odídeš" (by M. Lasica with Bratislava Hot Serenaders) – Vladimír Balko "About the Thing" (by Žena z lesoparku) – Ondrej Rudavský "Náladu mi dvíhaš" (by Misha) – Karol Vosátko • Reserve 07

=== Others ===
Lifetime Achievement	★ Marián Varga
