= Česko Slovenská SuperStar season 5 =

Česko Slovenská SuperStar
- Season 5
- Hosted by: Leoš Mareš; Jasmina Alagič
- Judges: Matěj Ruppert; Katarína Knechtová; Ben Cristovao; Pavol Habera
- Winner: Tereza Anna Mašková
- Runner-up: Eliška Rusková
- Finals venue: Barrandov Studios

Release
- Original network: Nova; Markíza
- Original release: February 24 – June 10, 2018

Season chronology
- ← Previous; Season 4 Next → Season 6

Česko Slovenská SuperStar (English: Czech&Slovak SuperStar) is the joint Czech-Slovak version of Idols merged from Česko hledá SuperStar and Slovensko hľadá SuperStar which previous to that had three individual seasons each. The fifth season castings were held in Prague, Brno, Ostrava, Žilina, Bratislava and Košice. The season premiered on February 24, 2018 on TV Nova in the Czech Republic and on February 25, 2018 on Markíza in Slovakia, which have also been the broadcast stations for the individual seasons.

== Regional auditions ==
Auditions were held in Bratislava, Košice, Prague, Ostrava, Žilina and Brno in the autumn and winter of 2017.

Audition City	Date
Ostrava, Czech Republic	November 11, 2017
Brno, Czech Republic	November 12, 2017
Žilina, Slovakia	November 18, 2017
Košice, Slovakia	November 19, 2017
Bratislava, Slovakia	November 25–26, 2017
Prague, Czech Republic	December 2–3, 2017

== Super Výber ==
After castings, remaining 120 contestant entered to the Super Výber.

In the first round, the girls were called in groups of ten to sing acapella in front of the judges. Each girl had a few seconds to sing and after the entire group performed, they found out whether they were eliminated or they would continue in the next round.

The boys did not get to perform at all, the judges told them they all advanced to the next round, due to the smaller number of boys in the contest.

The next round took place at the same night. All contestants were divided into 2 groups, the first one went to perform songs of their choice in front of the judges. The second group did not perform because they had impressed the judges before.

After the first two rounds, 60 contestants made it to the second day.

On the next day, the contestants sang solo with an acoustic band.

The songs they had to perform were:

Billionaire - Bruno Mars, Travie McCoy

Diamonds - Rihanna

Raise Your Glass - P!nk

Something Just Like This - The Chainsmokers, Coldplay

Rockabye - Clean Bandit, Sean Paul, Anne Marie

Love Yourself - Justin Bieber

Use Somebody - Kings Of Leon

Treat You Better - Shawn Mendes

Radioactive - Imagine Dragons

Million Reasons - Lady Gaga

Shape Of You - Ed Sheeran

Words - Emma Drobná

After this round, 20 contestants were sent home.

In the last round, 40 best contestants sang in pairs, where either 1 or both contestants were eliminated, or in some cases, both got through.

Four contestants received a “wild card” from judges, which meant their immediate advancement to the semi-finals.

Those contestants were: Jakub Pružinský, Zuzana Chalupová, Dominik Gerda and Adéla Ferencová.

The last round was Dlouhá cesta/Dlhá cesta in which 16 contestants made it to the semi-finals, creating the top 20.

== Semi-final ==
20 semifinalists were revealed in April when the show premiered on screen.

=== Top 10 - Boys ===
Order	Contestant	Song (original artist)	Result
1	Matej Bartko	"I'm Not the Only One" (Sam Smith)	Eliminated
2	Petr Borkovec	"Hold Back the River" (James Bay)	Advanced
3	Bryan Gandola	"Bohemian Rhapsody" (Queen)	Advanced
4	Dominik Gerda	"Carry You Home" (James Blunt)	Advanced
5	Richard Chovan	"Take Me to Church" (Hozier)	Advanced
6	Tomáš Karlík	"Iris" (Goo Goo Dolls)	Eliminated
7	Marek Motalík	"When We Were Young" (Adele)	Eliminated
8	Victor Peeters	"Love Runs Out" (OneRepublic)	Eliminated
9	Jakub Pružinský	"I See Fire" (Ed Sheeran)	Advanced
10	Kristián Révay	"Unchain My Heart" (Joe Cocker)	Eliminated

=== Top 10 - Girls ===
Order	Contestant	Song (original artist)	Result
1	Aneta Horňáková	"At Last" (Etta James)	Advanced
2	Karmen Pál-Baláž	"Someone like You" (Adele)	Advanced
3	Timea Lacová	"You Don't Own Me" (Grace ft. G-Eazy)	Eliminated
4	Adéla Ferencová	"Without You" (Mariah Carey)	Eliminated
5	Eliška Rusková	"Skyscraper" (Demi Lovato)	Advanced
6	Adéla Kvitová	"IDGAF" (Dua Lipa)	Advanced
7	Viktorie Černíková	"The Power of Love" (Gabrielle Aplin)	Eliminated
8	Tereza Anna Mašková	"One Night Only" (Jennifer Hudson)	Advanced
9	Ester Kubátová	"Another Love" (Tom Odell)	Eliminated
10	Zuzana Chalupová	"Believe" (Cher)	Eliminated

=== Finalist ===
Contestant	Age	Hometown	Place finished
Tereza Anna Mašková	21	Prague, Czech Republic	Winner
Eliška Rusková	15	Orlová, Czech Republic	Runner-up
Karmen Pál-Baláž	19	Rožňava, Slovakia	3rd
Petr Borkovec	18	Jablunkov, Czech Republic	4th
Jakub Pružinský	19	Považská Bystrica, Slovakia	5th
Aneta Horňáková	20	Senica, Slovakia	6th
Bryan Gandola	25	Prague, Czech Republic	7th
Adéla Kvitová	20	Ostrava, Czech Republic	8th
Dominik Gerda	24	Prešov, Slovakia	9th
Richard Chovan	27	Bratislava, Slovakia	10th

== Finals ==
Ten contestants made it to the finals. TOP 10 consists of 3 Slovak boys, 1 Czech boy, 1 Filipino boy, 2 Slovak girls and 3 Czech girl. Every final night has its theme. Audience can vote for contestants from the very beginning of the show, voting ends during result show on the same day.

=== Top 10 – No. 1 Hits ===
Order	Contestant	Song (original artist)	Result
1	Petr Borkovec	"Stitches" (Shawn Mendes)	Safe
2	Aneta Horňáková	"Crazy in Love" (Beyoncé)	Safe
3	Bryan Gandola	"Locked Out of Heaven" (Bruno Mars)	Safe
4	Karmen Pál-Baláž	"Dream On" (Aerosmith)	Safe
5	Jakub Pružinský	"Let Her Go" (Passenger)	Safe
6	Adéla Kvitová	"The Edge of Glory" (Lady Gaga)	Safe
7	Dominik Gerda	"Rude" (Magic!)	Eliminated
8	Eliška Rusková	"What About Us" (Pink)	Safe
9	Richard Chovan	"Titanium" (David Guetta ft. Sia)	Eliminated
10	Tereza Anna Mašková	"Billie Jean" (Michael Jackson)	Safe

- Group performance: "Counting Stars" (OneRepublic)

=== Top 8 – Dedications ===
Order	Contestant	Song (original artist)	Result
1	Petr Borkovec	"Human" (Rag'n'Bone Man)	Safe
2	Aneta Horňáková	"Can’t Help Falling In Love With You" (Elvis Presley)	Safe
3	Bryan Gandola	"Angels" (Robbie Williams)	Eliminated
4	Karmen Pál-Baláž	"Proud Mary" (Tina Turner)	Safe
5	Jakub Pružinský	"Viva la Vida" (Coldplay)	Safe
6	Adéla Kvitová	"Set Fire To The Rain" (Adele)	Eliminated
7	Eliška Rusková	"Shake It Off" (Taylor Swift)	Safe
8	Tereza Anna Mašková	"Chandelier" (Sia)	Safe

- Group performance: "Wake Me Up" (Avicii)

=== Top 6 – Czech and Slovak Songs & Duets ===
Order	Contestant	Song (original artist)	Result
1	Petr Borkovec	"Dotknu se ohně" (Lucie)	Saved
2	Aneta Horňáková	"Unikát" (Mária Čírová)	Eliminated
3	Karmen Pál-Baláž	"Chlap z kríža" (Szidi Tobias)	Safe
4	Jakub Pružinský	"Pocta Majakovskému" (Robo Grigorov)	Safe
5	Eliška Rusková	"Toužím" (Ewa Farná)	Safe
6	Tereza Anna Mašková	"Vyznanie" (Marika Gombitová)	Safe
7	Karmen Pál-Baláž & Tereza Anna Mašková	"Survivor" (Destiny's Child)	N/A
8	Jakub Pružinský & Aneta Horňáková	"Beneath Your Beautiful" (Labrinth ft. Emeli Sandé)	N/A
9	Petr Borkovec & Eliška Rusková	"Dusk Till Dawn" (Zayn Malik ft. Sia)	N/A

=== Top 5 – Old hits & New hits ===
Order	Contestant	Song (original artist)	Result
1	Petr Borkovec	"Proklínám" (Janek Ledecký)	Eliminated
2	Karmen Pál-Baláž	"Sweet Child O' Mine" (Guns N' Roses)	Safe
3	Jakub Pružinský	"Bonboniéra" (Gladiátor)	Eliminated
4	Eliška Rusková	"Stay" (Shakespears Sister)	Safe
5	Tereza Anna Mašková	"Hallelujah" (Leonard Cohen)	Safe
6	Petr Borkovec	"Rolling In The Deep" (Adele)	Eliminated
7	Karmen Pál-Baláž	"Wings" (Birdy)	Safe
8	Jakub Pružinský	"Impossible" (James Arthur)	Eliminated
9	Eliška Rusková	"A Thousand Years" (Christina Perri)	Safe
10	Tereza Anna Mašková	"Uptown Funk" (Mark Ronson ft. Bruno Mars)	Safe

- Group performance: "Spomaľ" (Katarína Knechtová)

=== Top 3 – Grand Finale ===
Order	Contestant	Song (original artist)	Result
1	Karmen Pál-Baláž	"The Show Must Go On" (Queen)	Eliminated
2	Eliška Rusková	"I Will Always Love You" (Whitney Houston)	Super Final
3	Tereza Anna Mašková	"Ain't Nobody" (Chaka Khan)	Super Final
4	Karmen Pál-Baláž	"My Immortal" (Evanescence)	Eliminated
5	Eliška Rusková	"Raise Your Glass" (Pink)	Super Final
6	Tereza Anna Mašková	"Fighter" (Christina Aguilera)	Super Final

- TOP 10: "Príbeh nekončí" (Anthem of SuperStar 2009 & 2015)

=== Top 2 – Super Final ===
Order	Contestant	Song (original artist)	Result
1	Eliška Rusková	"Lásko má já stůňu" (Helena Vondráčková)	Runner-up
2	Tereza Anna Mašková	"Jednoho dne se vrátíš " (Věra Špinarová)	Winner

== Elimination chart ==
Legend
Female	Male	Top 20	Top 10	Winner

Did Not Perform	Safe	Safe First	Safe Last	Eliminated

Stage:		Semi-Finals		Finals					
Week:		4/29	5/6	5/13	5/20	5/27	6/3	6/10	
Place	Contestant	Result							
1	Tereza Anna Mašková		Safe	Safe	Safe	Safe	Safe	Safe	Winner
2	Eliška Rusková		Safe	Safe	Safe	Safe	Safe	Safe	Runner-up
3	Karmen Pál-Baláž		Safe	Safe	Safe	Safe	Safe	Eliminated	
4-5	Petr Borkovec	Safe		Safe	Safe	Saved	Eliminated		
4-5	Jakub Pružinský	Safe		Safe	Safe	Safe	Eliminated		
6	Aneta Horňáková		Safe	Safe	Safe	Eliminated			
7-8	Bryan Gandola	Safe		Safe	Eliminated				
7-8	Adéla Kvitová		Safe	Safe	Eliminated				
9-10	Dominik Gerda	Safe		Eliminated					
9-10	Richard Chovan	Safe		Eliminated					
Semi- Final 2	Timea Lacová		Eliminated						
Semi- Final 2	Adéla Ferencová		Eliminated						
Semi- Final 2	Viktorie Černíková		Eliminated						
Semi- Final 2	Ester Kubátová		Eliminated						
Semi- Final 2	Zuzana Chalupová		Eliminated						
Semi- Final 1	Matej Bartko	Eliminated							
Semi- Final 1	Tomáš Karlík	Eliminated							
Semi- Final 1	Marek Motalík	Eliminated							
Semi- Final 1	Victor Peeters	Eliminated							
Semi- Final 1	Kristián Révay	Eliminated							

== Contestants who appeared on other seasons/shows ==
- Tereza Anna Mašková was a semi-finalist on Česko Slovensko má talent season 1.
- Adéla Ferencová was a finalist on Česko Slovensko má talent season 2.
- Karmen Pál-Baláž appeared on X-Faktor Hungary season 7. She was eliminated before Judge's House.
