= OTO Award for Music Band =

Slovak award category

OTO Award
Music Band

Currently held by
IMT Smile

First awarded | Last awarded
2013 | Present

OTO Award for Music Band has been awarded since the 2013, established by Art Production Agency (APA) in Slovakia. The award is presented to the most recognized music band of the past year with the ceremony permitted live by the national television network STV.

== Winners and nominees ==
=== 2010s ===
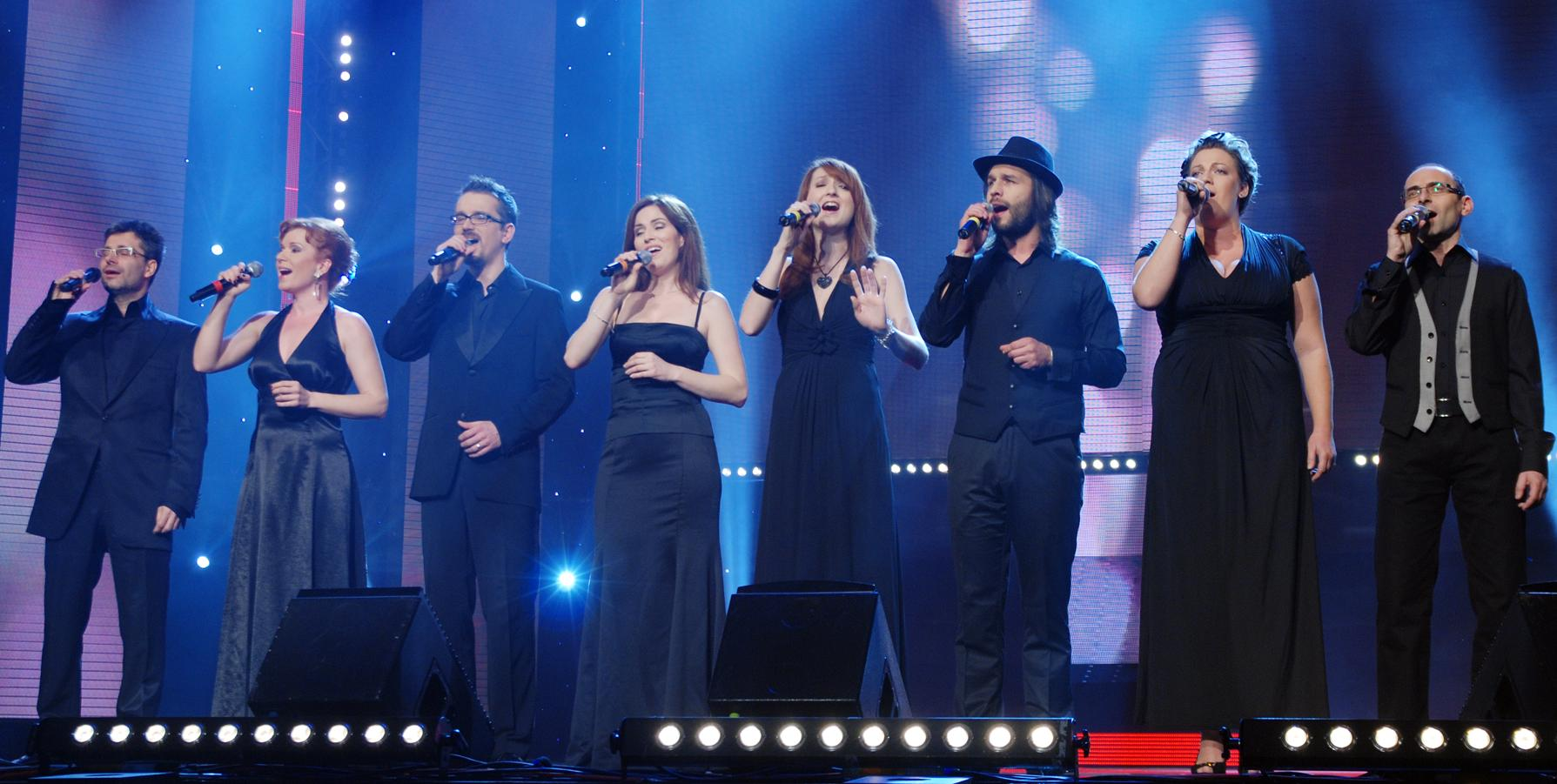
Fragile has won the award at all ceremonies since.

Year	Recipient	Nominees
2010	Not awarded	
2011	Not awarded	
2012	Not awarded	
2013	★ Fragile (3 consecutive wins)	Desmod; Peter Bič Project
2014	★ Fragile (3 consecutive wins)	IMT Smile; Peter Bič Project
2015	★ Fragile (3 consecutive wins)	Elán; IMT Smile
2016	★ IMT Smile	Desmod; Fragile

== Superlatives ==
=== Multiple winners ===
3 awards

- Fragile

=== Multiple nominees ===
4 nominations

- Fragile

3 nominations

- IMT Smile

2 nominations

- Peter Bič Project
- Desmod
