= 14th OTO Awards =

14th OTO Awards

8 March 2014

SND, Bratislava, Slovakia

Overall winner
Marcel Merčiak

Hall of Fame
Juraj Kukura

Život Award
Pavol Barabáš

◄ 13th | 15th ►

The 14th OTO Awards, honoring the best in Slovak popular culture for the year 2013, occurred on 8 March 2014 at the Slovak National Theater in Bratislava. The ceremony broadcast live on Jednotka, with Adela Vinczeová and Matej Cifra hosting the show.

== Winners and nominees ==
=== Main categories ===
Television

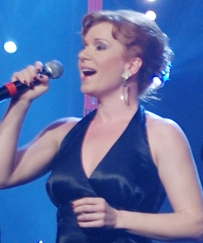
Helena Krajčiová

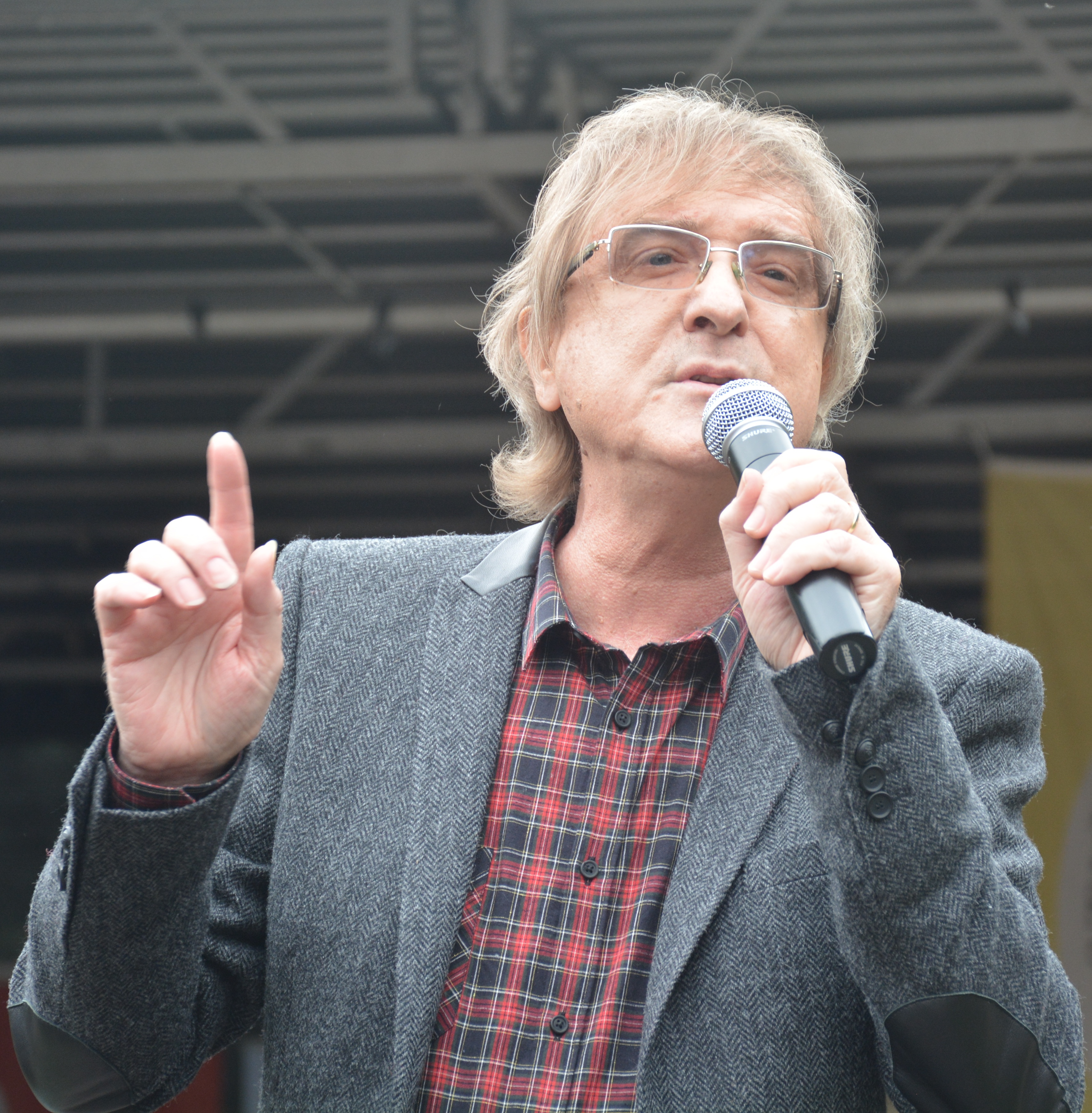
Miroslav Žbirka

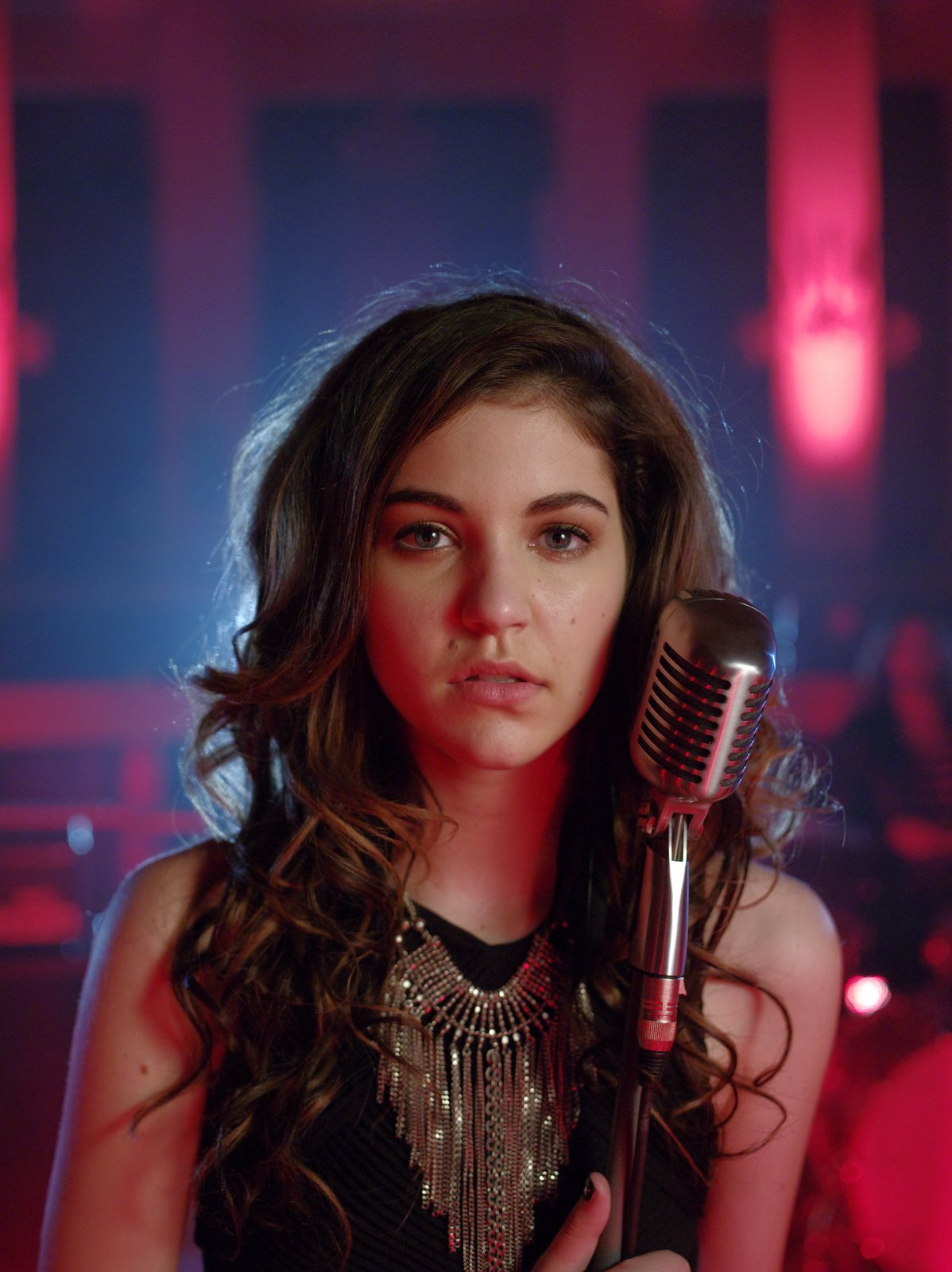
Celeste Buckingham

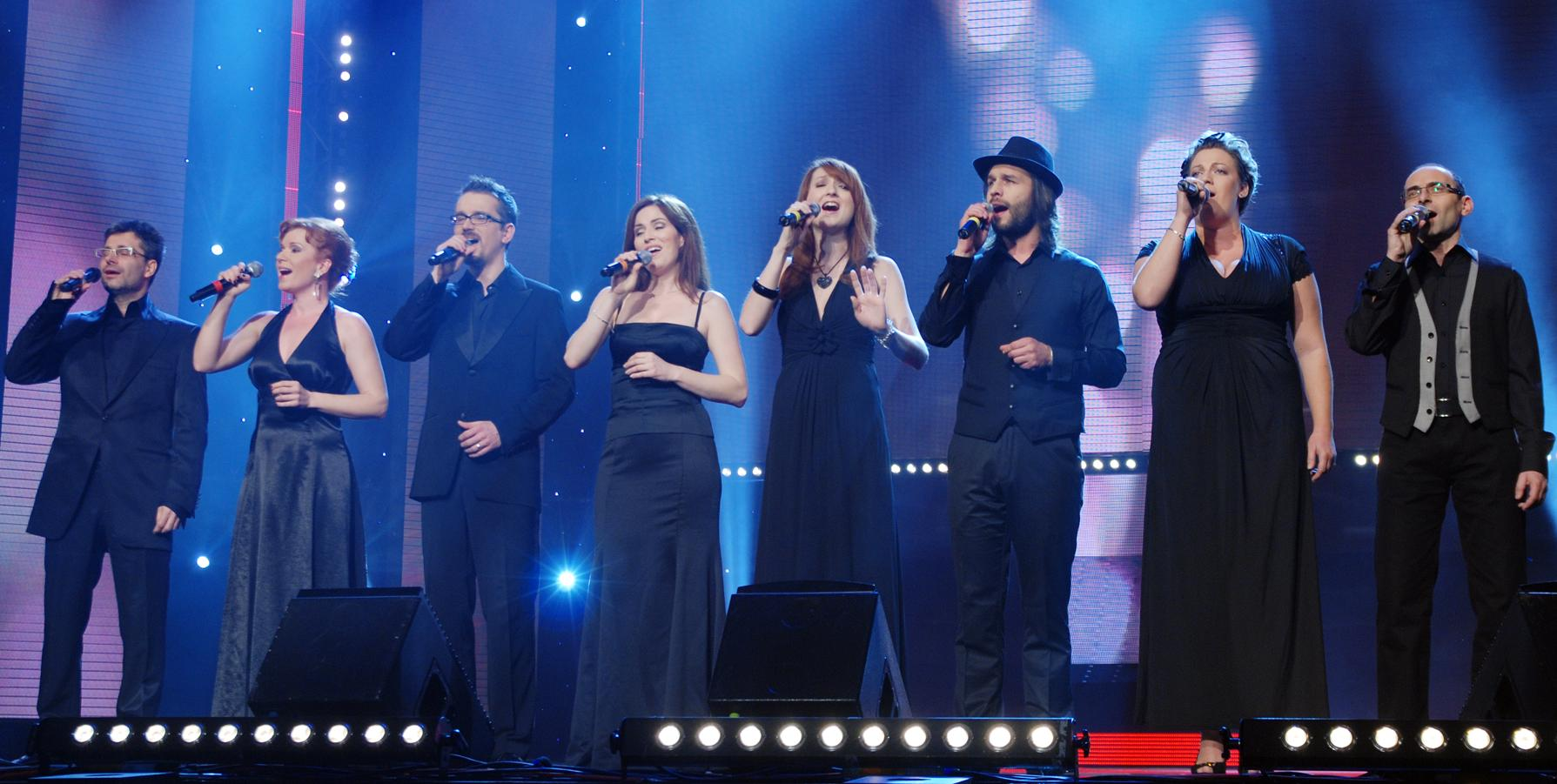
Fragile

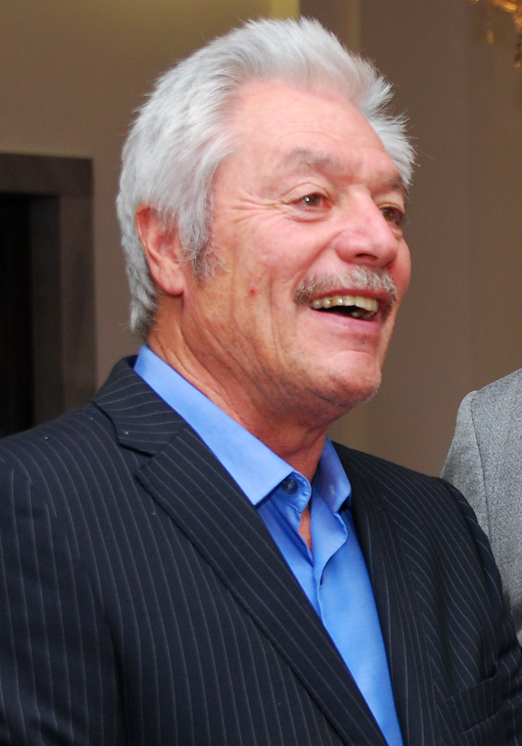
Juraj Kukura

| News Host | News Reporter |
|---|---|
| ★ Lucia Barmošová: Ľubomír Bajaník; Ján Mečiar | ★ Jozef Kubáni: Danica Kleinová; Adam Zavřel |
| Sports Host | Sports Commentator |
| ★ Peter Varinský: Lenka Čviriková (née Hriadelová); Marcel Merčiak | ★ Marcel Merčiak: Peter Čambor; Ján Plesník |
| Journalist | Entertainer |
| ★ Patrik Herman: Ján Mečiar; Zlatica Švajdová (née Puškárová) | ★ Andrej Bičan: Martin Rausch; Viliam Rozboril |
| Actor | Actress |
| ★ Lukáš Latinák: Ján Jackuliak; Tomáš Maštalír | ★ Helena Krajčiová: Monika Hilmerová; Diana Mórová |
New Actor
★ Marcel Chlpík; Sabína Grláková; Juraj Loj
| Program | Show |
| ★ Srdce pre deti – JOJ: Slovensko 2013 Advent – RTVS; Trochu inak v SND – TA3 | ★ Milujem Slovensko – RTVS: 5 proti 5 – RTVS; Modré z neba – Markíza |
Series
★ Búrlivé víno – Markíza; Panelák – JOJ; Profesionáli – JOJ

Music

| Male Singer | Female Singer |
|---|---|
| ★ Miroslav Žbirka: Marián Čekovský; Mário "Kuly" Kollár | ★ Celeste Buckingham: Nela Pocisková; Zuzana Smatanová |
Band
★ Fragile; Desmod; Peter Bič Project

=== Others ===
| Overall winner | ★ Marcel Merčiak |
| Hall of Fame | ★ Juraj Kukura |
| Život Award | ★ Pavol Barabáš |

== Superlatives ==
=== Multiple nominees ===
2 nominations

- Ján Mečiar
- Marcel Merčiak

== Reception ==
=== TV ratings ===
The show has received a total audience of more than 551,000 viewers, making it the most watched television program within prime time in the region.
