= '01 (Richard Müller album) =

Studio album by Richard Müller
- Released: 2001
- Genre: pop rock
- Length: 51:38
- Label: Universal Music
- Producer: Ivan Tásler

Richard Müller chronology
... a hosté (2000)	'01 (2001)	Monogamný vzťah (2004)

Singles from '01
- 1. "Spočítaj ma" 2. "Do čista" 3. "Nahý II."; 4. "Rieka"

'01 is the seventh solo album by the Slovak singer Richard Müller. Müller wrote most of the lyrics and, due to the death of his favourite composer Jaro Filip, Müller also composed half of the music. The album was critically well received, and placed at number 9 in the Czech musicserver.cz's list of the 25 best Czech and Slovak albums of the decade.

== Track listing ==
1. "Už asi nie si" (Richard Müller, Müller) – 3:49
2. "Spočítaj ma" (Müller, Jaro Filip) – 4:33
3. "2 líšky" (Ivan Tásler, Müller) – 6:10
4. "Cítim" (Müller, Müller) – 4:08
5. "Do čista" (Müller, Müller) – 4:03
6. "Studňa" (Tásler / Vlado Krausz) – 3:42
7. "Ako vánok" (Marcel Buntaj, Tásler, Müller, Filip) – 3:09
8. "Rieka" (Tásler, Müller) – 5:05
9. "Ráno" (Müller, Filip) – 5:22
10. "Nahý II" (Tásler, Müller) – 3:59
11. "Planý poplach duše" (Filip, Müller) – 5:39

The album's 12th track is a 1:09 excerpt of an early version of Planý poplach duše sung by composer Jaro Filip.

== See also ==
- 1st Aurel Awards
