= OTO Award for TV Sports Commentator =

OTO Award
TV Sports Commentator

Currently held by
Marcel Merčiak

First awarded | Last awarded
2001 | Present

OTO Award for TV Sports Commentator has been awarded since the second edition of the accolades, established by Art Production Agency (APA) in Slovakia in 2000. Each year, the award has been presented to the most recognized television sportcasters of the past year with the ceremony permitted live by the national television network STV.

== Winners and nominees ==
=== 2000s ===
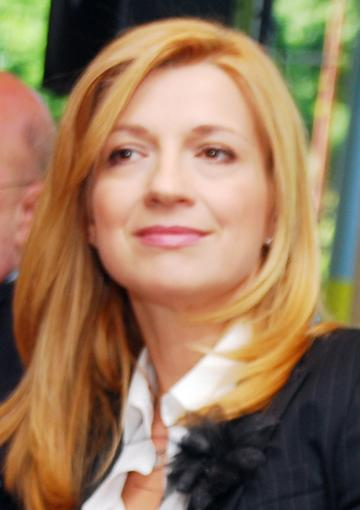
Jarmila Lajčáková, formerly a Sports Host-winner, has won among the sportscasters too.

Year	Recipient	Nominees
2000	Not awarded	
2001	★ Jarmila Lajčáková^{┼†} (née Hargašová)	Stanislav Ščepán; Marcel Merčiak; Miroslav Michalech
2002	★ Miroslav Michalech	Ján Plesník; Stanislav Ščepán
2003	Held only in joint-category	
2004	Held only in joint-category	
2005	Held only in joint-category	
2006	Held only in joint-category	
2007	Held only in joint-category	
2008	Held only in joint-category	
2009	Held only in joint-category	

=== 2010s ===
Year	Recipient	Nominees
2010	Held only in joint-category	
2011	Held only in joint-category	
2012	★ Marcel Merčiak^{†Ž} (5 consecutive wins)	Ján Plesník; Stanislav Ščepán
2013	★ Marcel Merčiak^{†Ž} (5 consecutive wins)	Peter Čambor; Ján Plesník
2014	★ Marcel Merčiak^{†Ž} (5 consecutive wins)	Štefan Eisele; Ján Plesník
2015	★ Marcel Merčiak^{†Ž} (5 consecutive wins)	Štefan Eisele; Ján Plesník
2016	★ Marcel Merčiak^{†Ž} (5 consecutive wins)	Štefan Eisele; Slávo Jurko

== Superlatives ==
=== Multiple winners ===
5 awards

- Marcel Merčiak^{†Ž}

=== Multiple nominees ===
6 nominations

- Marcel Merčiak

5 nominations

- Ján Plesník

3 nominations

- Stanislav Ščepán
- Štefan Eisele

2 nominations

- Miroslav Michalech

Notes

^{┼} Denotes also a winner in two or more of the main categories.
^{†} Denotes also a winner of the Absolute OTO category.
^{Ž} Denotes also a winner of the Život Award.
