= Misha (singer) =

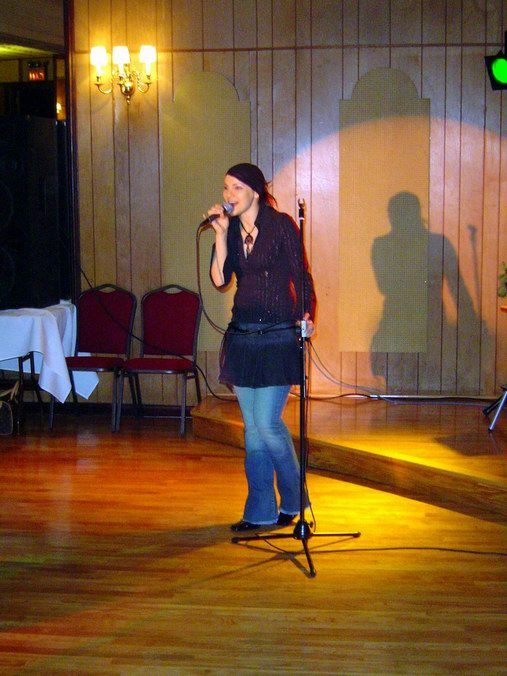

Background information
- Born: Michaela Paľová; 6 March 1975 (age 51)
- Origin: Michalovce, Slovakia
- Genres: R&B; soul; jazz
- Years active: 2002–present
- Label: Monitor EMI
- Website: www.misha.sk

Michaela Paľová (born 6 March 1975) known under her stage name Misha, is an R&B and soul vocalist, from Slovakia. She has released three studio albums. Her latest album, 13000krát, was released in October 2007. Her first single "Náladu mi dvíhaš" was released in June 2002 and scored No.1 on the Slovak airplay chart. It was followed by a second single, "Druha," written by the American bassist and composer Gregory Delcore, which remained on the top of the Slovak airplay chart for 6 weeks. Misha was the winner of the Coca-Cola Pop Star talent contest in 2002. In 2002, 2003, and 2004 she received a number of Slovak Music Academy and popularity awards.

Though she went to study English at university (graduated in 1997), after nine years of working as an English teacher, translator and interpreter she pursued music and has been writing lyrics and co-writing music on all her tracks ever since. She has collaborated with many Slovak and Czech artists including the African bass player, singer and multi-instrumentalist Richard Bona.

She has a website and a MySpace page.

== Discography ==
=== Albums ===
- Colors in My Life (2002)
- Misha (2005)
- 13000krát (2007)
- Ako nikdy predtým (2010)

=== Singles ===
- "Náladu mi dvíhaš" (2002)
- "Druhá" (2002)
- "Naozajstné, dobré" (2003)
- "Dobrý pocit" (2004)
- "Barbecue" (2005)
- "Stále" (2005)
- "Možno sa to dá" (2006)
- "Čiarky" (2007)
- "Spomalíme svet" (2007)
- "Afrodiziakum" (2008)
- "Budeme Alright" (2009)
- "Krídla" (2009)

== See also ==
- The 100 Greatest Slovak Albums of All Time
