= Peha =

Slovak pop rock band

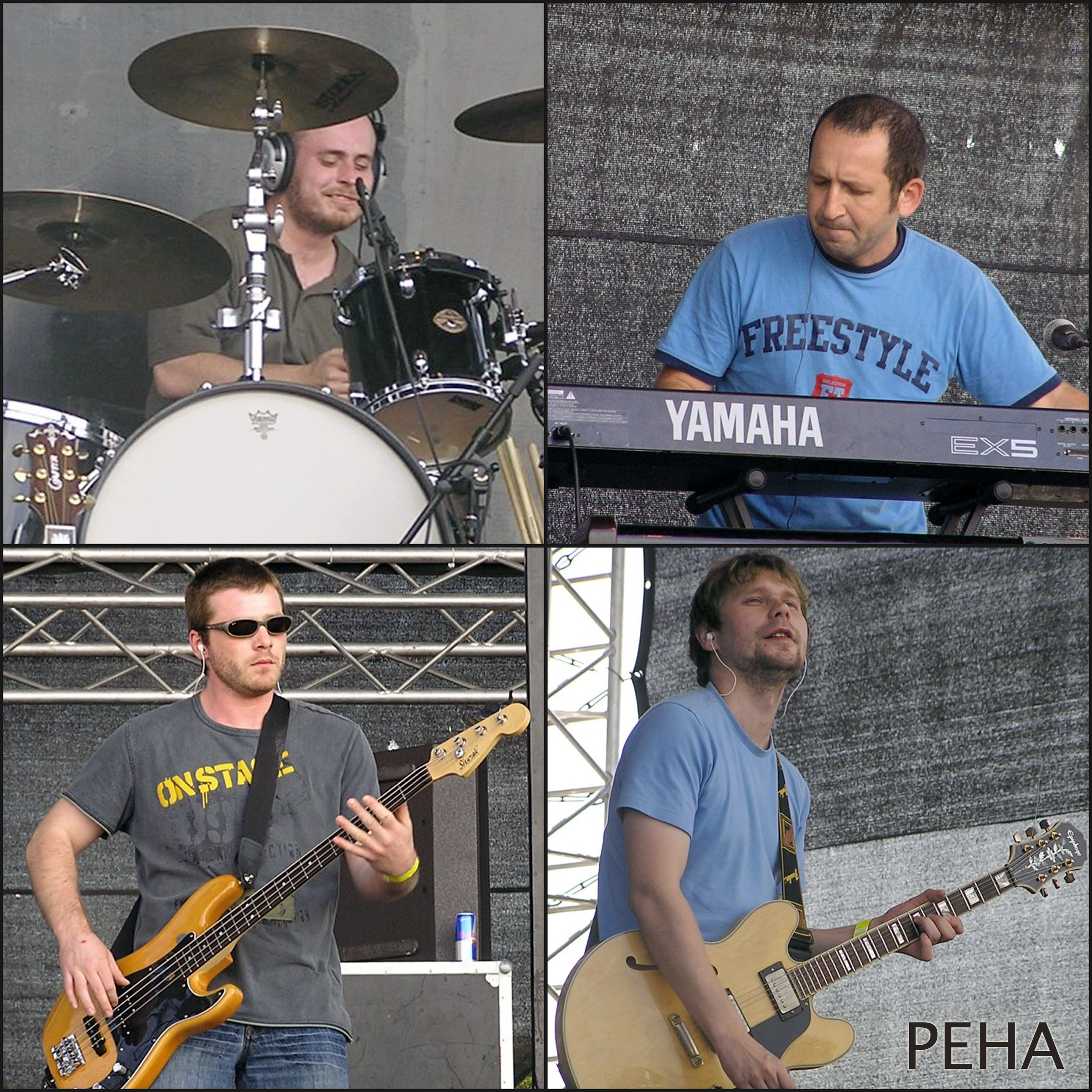
- Peha performing in 2006: From top left, clockwise: Martin Migaš, Juraj Ondko, Marek Belanský, Karol Sivák

Background information
- Also known as: Peha & Karmen Pál-Baláž (2018)
- Origin: Prešov, Slovakia
- Genres: Rock; pop rock
- Years active: 1997–2008; 2011–2012; 2018
- Labels: Sony Music/Bonton; B&N Music; Sony BMG
- Past members: Katarína Knechtová; Karol Sivák; Marek Belanský; Juraj Ondko; Martin Migaš; Romana Hlobeňová; Karmen Pál-Baláž

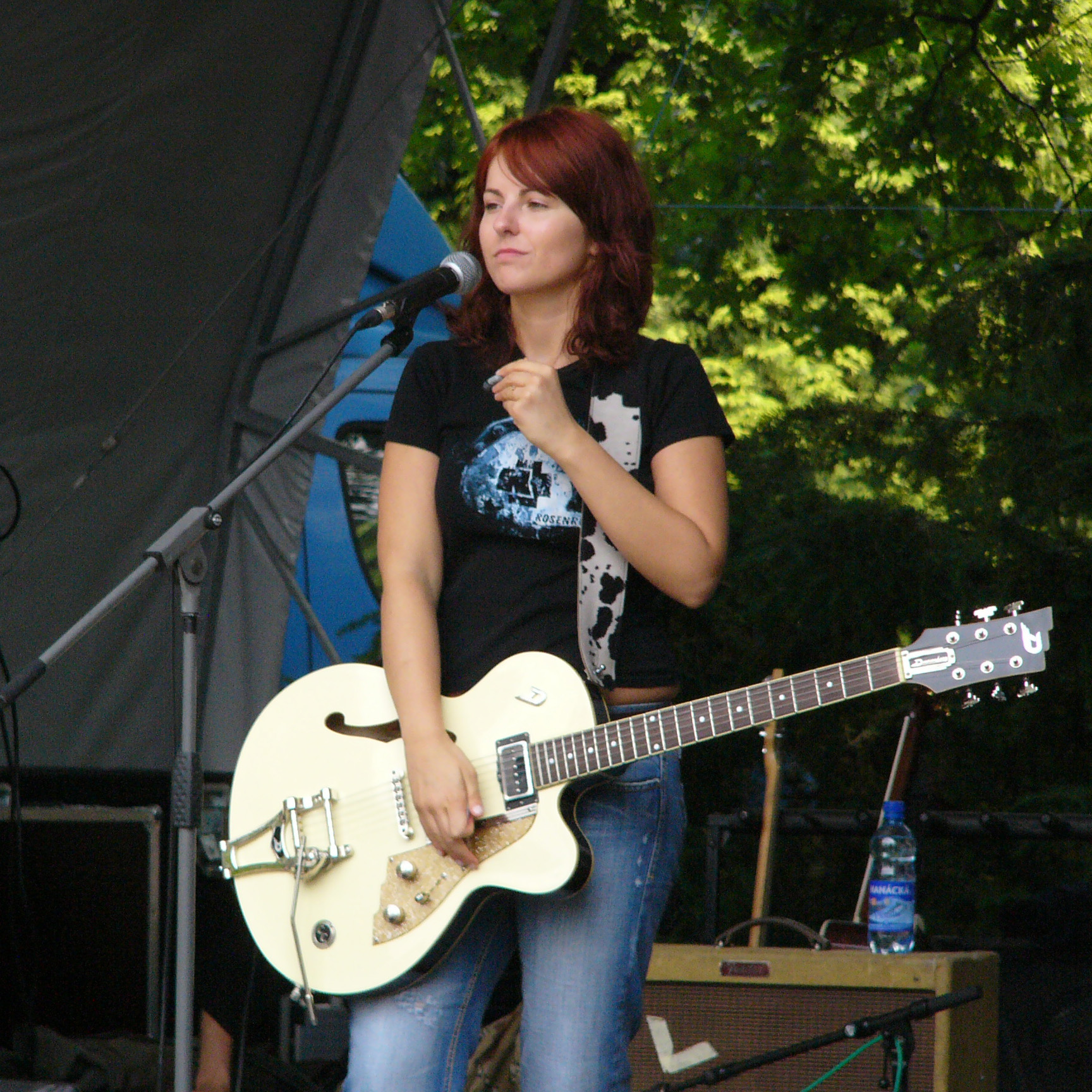
Katarína Knechtová in 2007

Peha, also known as Peha & Karmen Pál-Baláž, was a Slovak pop rock band from Prešov that originally consisted of Katarína Knechtová, Martin Migaš, Karol Sivák, Marek Belanský, and Juraj Ondko. They won several Slávik and Aurel Awards throughout their career, including in 2006 for Best Song, with the No. 1 hit "Spomaľ". The band released four studio albums and broke up in 2008 after Knechtová's departure. In 2011, they reformed with a new singer and released the single "Minca". After another hiatus, Peha regrouped again in 2018, with SuperStar 2018 winner Karmen Pál-Baláž on vocals. They have been inactive since 2019.

== History ==
Peha was formed in 1997 when former members of IMT Smile Katarína Knechtová (vocals, guitar) and Martin Migaš (drums) joined with 67th Harlem members Karol Sivák (guitar), Marek Belanský (bass), and Juraj Ondko (keyboards). They released their debut studio album, titled Niečo sa chystá, in 1999, and followed it with Krajinou (2001), Experiment (2003), and Deň medzi nedeľou a pondelkom (2005). In 2008, Knechtová left to start a solo career, spelling an end to Peha.

In 2011, it was announced that the group had reformed with a new vocalist, 16-year-old Romana Hlobeňová. During her year-long stint, the band released the single "Minca". Members of Peha later distanced themselves from Hlobeňová, stating she had never been an official member. Hlobeňová, now Kiššová, currently performs under the name ROuMY as a solo artist.

Peha regrouped once more in 2018, with SuperStar 2018 winner Karmen Pál-Baláž behind the microphone, and they were briefly known as Peha & Karmen Pál-Baláž. The group dissolved once more a year later.

== Band members ==
- Katarína Knechtová – vocals, guitar
- Karol Sivák – guitar
- Marek Belanský – bass
- Juraj Ondko – keyboards
- Martin Migaš – drums
- Romana "ROuMY" Hlobeňová – vocals
- Karmen Pál-Baláž – vocals

== Discography ==
Studio albums

- Niečo sa chystá (1999)
- Krajinou (2001)
- Experiment (2003)
- Deň medzi nedeľou a pondelkom (2005)

Compilations

- Best Of (2006)
- Donekonečna (The Best of 1997–2010) (2010)

== Awards ==
- Aurel Award for Best Female Singer (Katarína Knechtová) – 2001
- Aurel Award for Best Singer (Katarína Knechtová) – 2005
- Aurel Award for Best Song ("Spomaľ") – 2006
- Slávik Award for Band of the Year – 2006
- Slávik Award for Band of the Year (2007)
- Slávik Award for Female Singer of the Year (Katarína Knechtová) – 2007
