= Banket (band) =

Slovak pop band

- Origin: Bratislava, Slovakia
- Genres: Synthpop; pop; new wave
- Years active: 1984–1991
- Labels: Opus
- Past members: Richard Müller; Andrej Šeban; Martin Karvaš; Emil Frátrik; Svaťo Juřík; Dušan Hájek

Banket was a Slovak pop band active between 1984 and 1991. Its lead singer was Richard Müller. Banket were among the pioneers of electronic pop music in Slovakia and Czechoslovakia in the 1980s. In this regard, they can be considered Slovakia's answer to Depeche Mode.

Banket made their first performance in 1984 at the Bratislava Lyre pop festival with the song Nespoznaný (Unknown). Some of Banket's best-known and typically "electronic" hits originated between 1984 and 1985, but they were not included on the band's debut album Bioelektrovízia (Bioelectrovision, 1986) that was more conventional in nature. These early hits were (although not all of them) for the first time issued on a CD on the 1994 greatest hits album Banket ’84–’91.

== Discography ==
=== Albums ===
Year	Title	Translation of title	Note
1986	Bioelektrovízia	Bioelectrovision	debut album
1988	Up the Stairs	—	English version of debut album
1988	Druhá doba?!	Second Era?!	second studio album
1990	Vpred?	Forwards?	third and final studio album
1998	Banket ’84–’91	—	best-of double-album; first album release of many of the band's earliest hits
2005	Gold	—	greatest hits selection (however, lacking many of Banket's greatest hits)

=== Hits ===
A chronological selection of Banket's greatest hits:

- Nespoznaný (Unknown, 1984) – a ballad, not in the typical electronic style; the band's first single
- Dva metre v hubertuse (Two Meters in a Duffel Coat, 1984)
- Prečo vy, ľudia 20. storočia, máte vždy zachmúrené obočia? (Why Do You, People of the 20th Century, Keep Frowning All the Time?, 1985) – the band's first smash hit, considered legendary today; the song's lyrics are a sly parody of the cheerful lyrics required of pop bands by the Communist regime prevalent in Czechoslovakia at the time; this was the band's second single release
- Štrbina možnej lásky v grafikone nesmelého muža (A Crack of Possible Love Affair in the Schedule of a Shy Man, 1985) – another hit featuring Banket's trademark electronic sound and an impossibly long title; released as the B side of the preceding song
- Praveký manekýn (Primaeval Mannequin, 1985) – probably the closest Banket ever came to sounding like Depeche Mode
- Basketbal alebo ja (Basketball Or Me, 1985) – the band's third single release
- Po schodoch (Up the Stairs, 1986) – the band's greatest ever hit, but more conventional than the electronic pop preceding it
- Tlaková níž (The Pressure Is Low, 1986) – an electronic ballad and another huge hit for Banket
- Bioelektrovízia (Bioelectrovision, 1986) – Banket's trademark electronic sound; title song of debut album
- Salieri (1986) – inspired by Miloš Forman's blockbuster movie Amadeus
- Slon v porceláne (Elephants Are Crazy, 1986) – a ballad
- Nezavadzaj (Get Out of My Way, 1986)
- Plesový marš (Ball March, 1988) – an ingenious re-working of Johann Strauss Sr.'s Radetzky March, employing the sound of screeching guitars
- Slovenské tango (Slovak Tango, 1988)
- Bytové jadro problému (Apartment Core of the Matter, 1988) – a nonsense, tongue-in-cheek sequel to Up the Stairs
- Nález na svedomí (Finding of Conscience, 1988) – electronic ballad
- Slaďák (Ballad, 1988) – a fast-paced song, despite the title
- Slúžiť ti chcem (I Want to Serve You, 1990) – a ballad
- Aj ty! (You Too!, 1990)

== See also ==
- The 100 Greatest Slovak Albums of All Time
