= Ghymes =

Slovak rock band

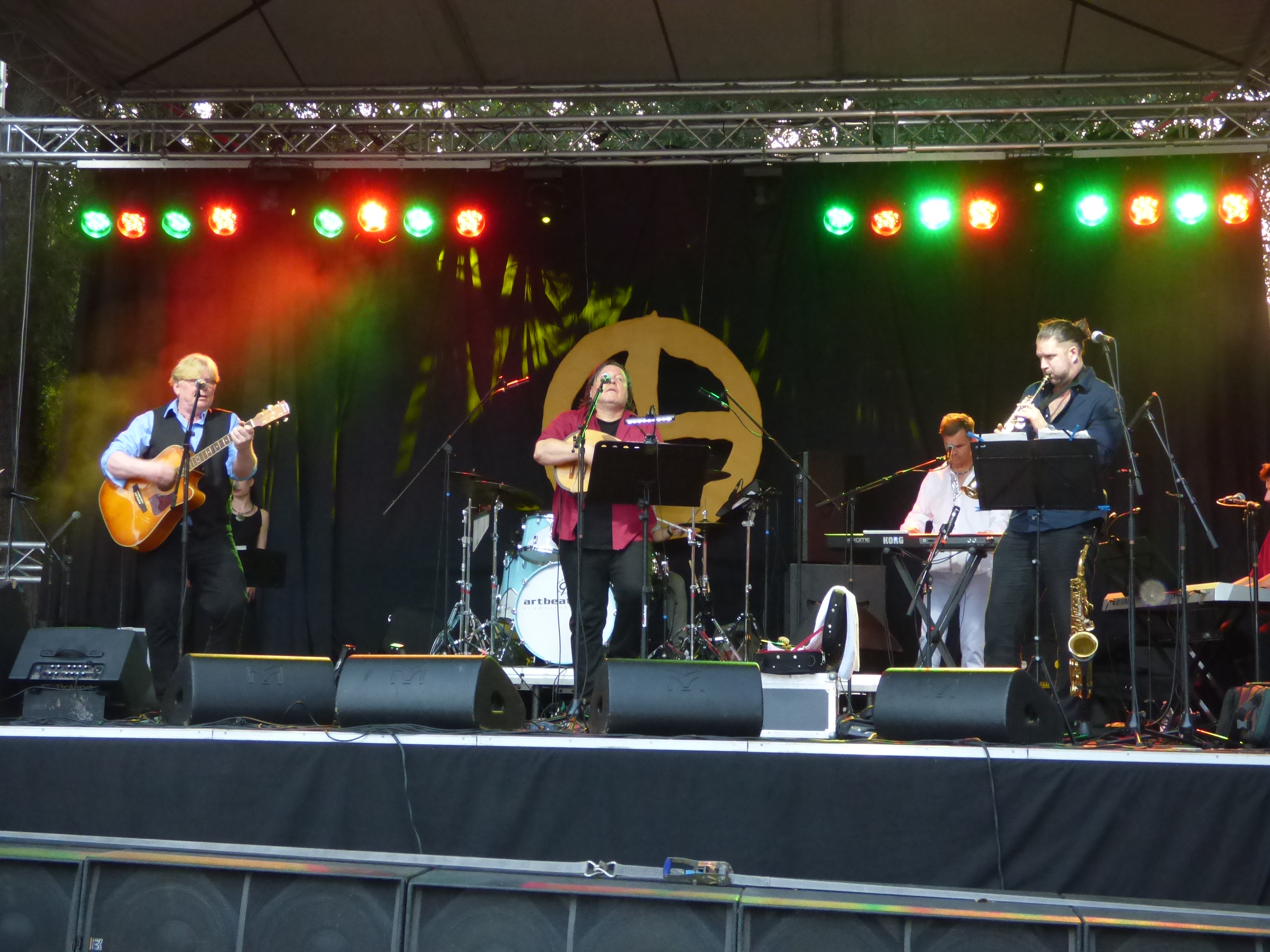
- Ghymes in 2016

Background information
- Origin: Nitra, Slovakia
- Genres: Rock, folk rock, world music
- Years active: 1984–present
- Label: EMI
- Members: Gyula Szarka; Tamás Szarka Csaba Kún; Péter Jelasity; András Jász; Szabolcs Nagy; Tamás Széll; János Lau; Imre Molnár; Bori Varga
- Past members: Andor Buják
- Website: Official website

Ghymes is a band consisting of musicians of the Hungarian minority from Slovakia, founded at the University of Education in Nitra in 1984, by musicians with different preliminary musical experiences from classical through rock and Renaissance music. Folk elements have gradually clung together with their own individual musical ideas.

In the year of 2000, Ghymes had the opportunity to attend two events: the World Expo 2000 in Hanover (Day of Hungary) and the official celebrations of the New Millennium in Hungary (St. Stephen's day, August 20, 2000).

Smaragdváros (Emerald City) was produced by EMI Records and came out in Hungary in November 2000. In March 2001, it was #11 on the World Music Charts Europe.

On December 24, 2018, the band performed a Christmas concert, Mennyből az angyal [Angel from heaven], which broadcast on national television (Duna Televizio). The Ghymes band performed together with the Hungarian Radio's children's choir.

== Members ==
- Gyula Szarka - lead vocal, contrabass, guitar, calabash zither, fretless bass, lute, vocals
- Tamás Szarka - lead vocal, violin, koboz (Hungarian lute), guitar, contrabass, fretless bass, percussion, bass drum, calabash zither, vocals
- Csaba Kún - synthesizer, vocals
- Péter Jelasity - alto and soprano saxophone, flute
- András Jász - alto saxophone
- Szabolcs Nagy - synthesizer, bass drum, vocals
- Tamás Széll - percussion, drums
- János Lau - percussion, drums
- Imre Molnár - contrabass, vocals
- Bori Varga - alto and soprano saxophone, Turkish pipe, recorder, bassoon, vocals

== Discography ==
- 1988: Az ifjúság sólyommadár (Youth as Falcon)
- 1991: Ghýmes
- 1993: Üzenet (Message)
- 1995: Bennünk van a kutyavér (Dog's Blood's Inside Us)
- 1996: Tűzugrás (Firejump)
- 1998: Rege (Legend)
- 2000: Smaragdváros (Emerald City)
- 2001: Üzenet (Message - latest release)
- 2002: Héjavarázs (Hawkspell)
- 2003: Ghymes koncert (Ghymes Concert)
- 2004: éGHYMESe (Sky Thale)
- 2005: Csak a világ végire... (Only to the Edge of the World)
- 2006: Messzerepülő (Farflyer)
- 2007: Mendika
- 2008: Álombálom (My Dream Ball)
- 2010: Szikraszemű (Spark-eyed)
- 2016: Mennyből az angyal

Other releases

- 2001: A nagy mesealbum (The Big Album of Fairy Tales - various artists)
- 2002: Bakaballada (Soldier's Ballad - with Hobo)
- 2003: A nagy mesealbum II. (The Big Album of Fairy Tales II)
- 2006: Üvegtigris 2 (Glass Tiger 2)

Members releases
Gyula Szarka

- 2004: Alku (Deal)
- 2007: Bor és a lányka (Wine and the Girl)

Tamás Szarka

- 2004: Anonymus
