= Andrej Šeban =

Slovak musician (born 1962)

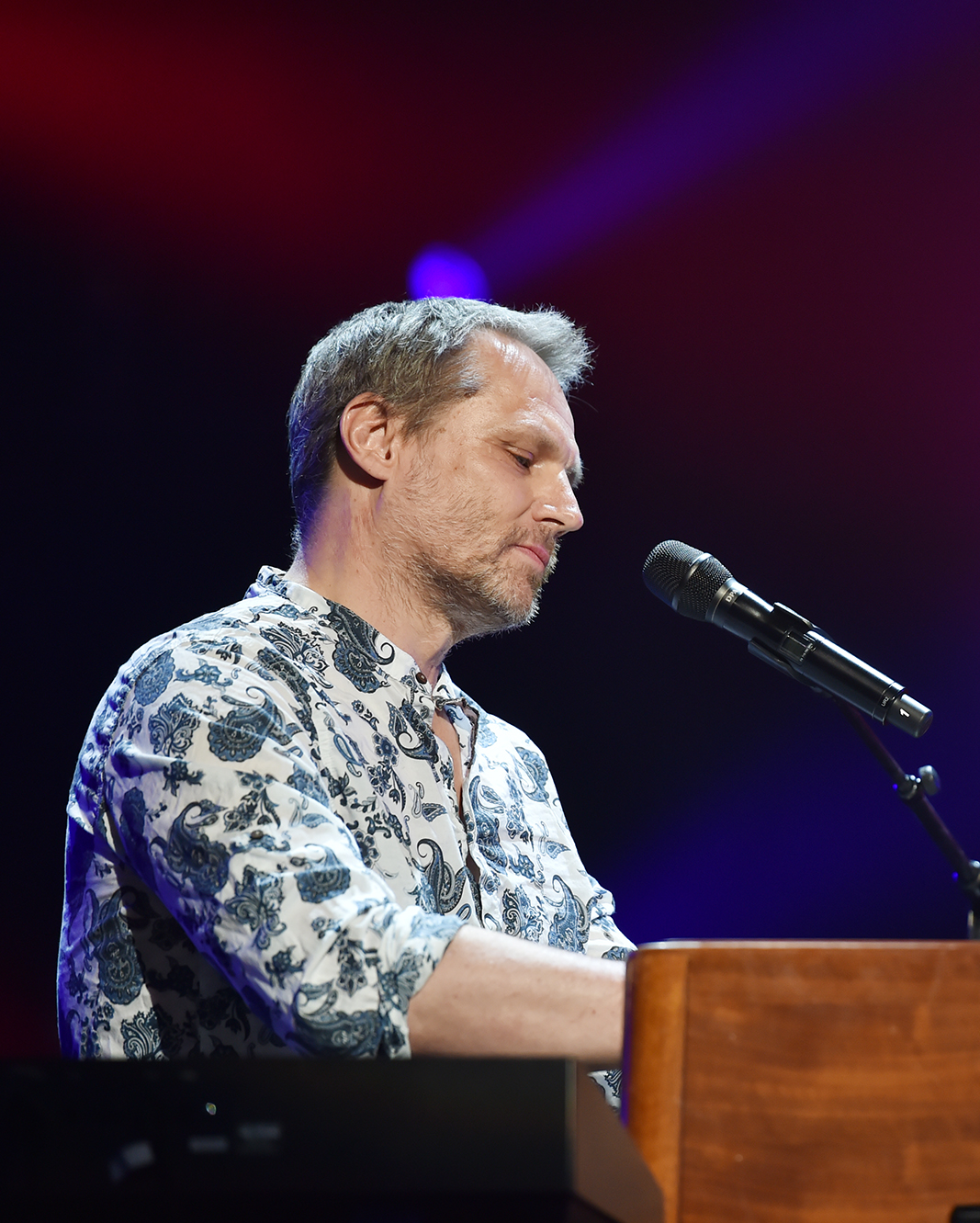
- Šeban in 2017

Background information
- Born: 23 June 1962 (age 64); Bratislava, Czechoslovakia
- Genre: Jazz fusion
- Occupation: Musician
- Instruments: Guitar; keyboards; vocals
- Years active: 1977–present
- Member of: Ash Band/Andrej Šeban Band
- Formerly of: Míting; Nervy; Tristo hrmených; Burčiak; Banket; Combo; Tutu; Provisorium; Lipa-Šeban Band; Free Faces; Chillpill
- Website: andrejseban.com

Andrej Šeban (born 23 June 1962) is a Slovak guitarist, composer, producer, and multi-instrumentalist.

== Life and career ==
Šeban was born in Bratislava in 1962. At the age of seven, he began playing piano and later guitar. At around the age of 15, he was a member of the jazz rock band Míting. In high school, he formed the band Nervy (later renamed Demikát) with Martin Ďurinda and Marián Greksa. Šeban graduated in musicology from FFUK in 1985. In 1986, he wrote the score for the film Slané cukríky and briefly played in the groups Tristo hrmených and Burčiak with Pavol Habera.

After university, Šeban became a member of the army's artistic ensemble, with Richard Müller, and they later went on to form the pop band Banket. He was also in Peter Lipa's Combo until 1989. From then until 1993, Šeban played with the fusion group Tutu. With his own Ash Band (also known as Esh Band and Andrej Šeban Band), he toured England in 1993. From 1992 to 1995, he was a member of Provisorium. In 1996, together with Lipa, he formed Lipa-Šeban Band, which toured England, Portugal, and Switzerland. He is a co-founder of the progressive rock group Free Faces. In 2006, together with Martin Krampl, he formed Chillpill.

Šeban appeared as an actor in the 1980 film Odveta, directed by Ivan Húšťava.

In 2012, he began collaborating with younger musicians and revived Ash Band.

On Christmas Eve 2020, his recording studio was robbed, and guitars and equipment worth €35,000 were stolen.

== Awards ==
- 1992: Hudobná akadémia award – instrumentalist of the year
- 1994: Ladislav Martoník award for jazz composition
- 1994: Hudobná akadémia award – musical producer of the year
- 1995: Hudobná akadémia award – instrumentalist of the year
- 1997: Crystal Wing Award in the music category
- 1998: Hudobná akadémia award – instrumentalist of the year
- 2000: Hudobná akadémia award – instrumentalist of the year

== Partial discography ==
=== Solo ===
- Baal with Richard Müller (1989)
- Milión bohov with Oskar Rózsa and Marcel Buntaj (1999)
- Kamakura with Oskar Rózsa and Marcel Buntaj (2000)
- Bezvetrie (2000)
- Spaceboys Polymusic with Anton Kubasák (2005)
- Sklony (2008)
- Šeban – Godár – Breiner – Kolkovič with Vladimír Godár, Peter Breiner, and Jozef Kolkovič (2008)
- Časozber (2011)
- Triplet (2019) – triple album reissuing Hody náhody, Medzi Sviatkami, and Tokom
- Rock and Roll z Rači (2020)
- Zep Tepi (2021)

=== Ash Band ===
- Čo dom dal (1993)
- Andrej Šeban Band... (1997)
- Andrej Šeban Band Live in Bratislava (2013)

=== Soundtracks ===
- Slané cukríky (feature film, 1986)
- Nemožná (feature film, 1986)
- Kúpeľňový hráč (feature film, 1987)
- Karpatský les (documentary film, 1994)
- Plameň (radio play, 1995)
- Vrana Florenťanka (radio play, 1995)

=== Video ===
- Gitarová škola Andreja Šebana (instructional DVD, 2009)
- Gitarová škola Andreja Šebana II. (instructional DVD, 2012)
- Andrej Šeban Band Live in Bratislava (live DVD, 2012)

=== with Banket ===
- Bioelektrovízia (1986)
- Druhá doba?! (1988)
- Up the Stairs (1988)
- Vpred? (1990)
- Banket: 1984 – 1991 (compilation, 1991)
- Gold (compilation, 2005)
- 001 (EP, 2011)
- Biobonus (EP, 2011)

=== with Demikát ===
- Grejtst Hic (1995)

=== with Burčiak ===
- Stala sa nám láska (1989)

=== with Po piči front ===
- Po piči front (1996)

=== with Tutu ===
- Mr. Jazzman (1991)

=== with Free Faces ===
- Almost True Story (1998)
- I Am Waiting: Free Faces for Lawrence Ferlinghetti (1998)
- La Belle Epoque (2001)

=== with Chillpill ===
- Long Overdue 1 & 2 (2008)
- One Night Only: Live (DVD, 2008)
