= Katarína Knechtová =

Slovak musician (born 1981)

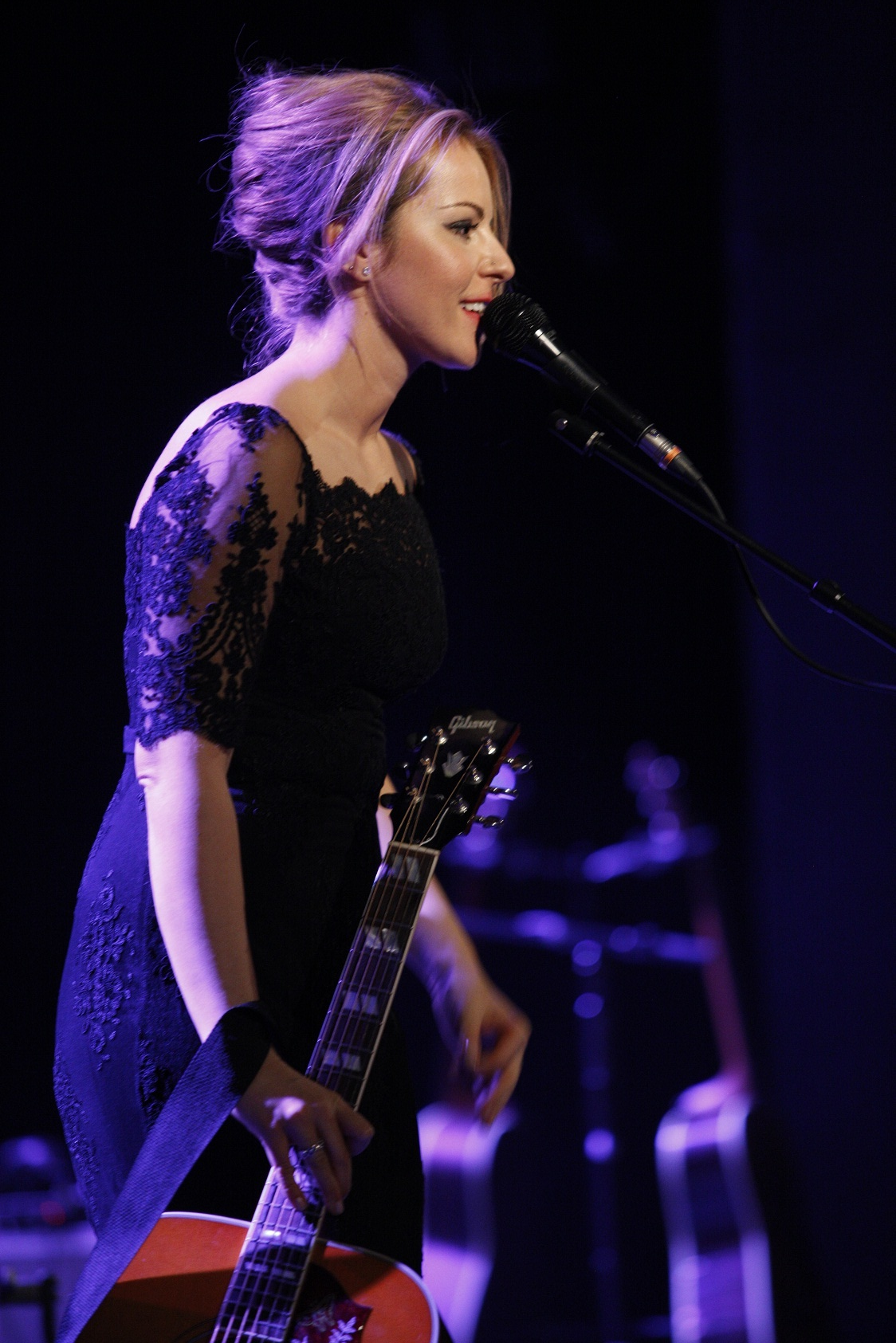
- Katarína Knechtová (2013)

Background information
- Also known as: Katka Knechtová
- Born: Katarína Knechtová; March 14, 1981 (age 45); Prešov, Slovakia
- Origin: Slovakia
- Genres: Pop, pop rock, rock, alternative rock
- Occupations: Singer, songwriter, guitarist, keyboardist
- Instruments: Guitar, keyboard
- Years active: 1996–present
- Labels: Universal Music, Perina
- Website: katarinaknechtova.com

Katarína Knechtová (born March 14, 1981) is a Slovak singer-songwriter and guitarist, originally known for her work with the band Peha.

== Biography ==
Katarína was born in Prešov, to a Czech mother and Slovak father. In Prešov she attended the Ján Adam Raymann Gymnasium. After finishing school, she studied philosophy. For seven years she studied to play keyboard, she is also a self-taught guitarist. She started her music career in local band named Prešovčatá. Katarína has a younger sister, Veronika.

== Music career ==
Katarína Knechtová debuted on the Slovak music scene in 1996 with the band IMT Smile led by Ivan Tásler. One year later, she left the band together with its drummer and joined the band Peha, which was considered the revelation of the year in 1999. Two years later, Katarína won the Aurel award as the best female singer (in 2005, she won it again). She also won the OTO award in 2007.

Even though she wrote a lot of lyrics, she credits Vlado Krausz as her "main writer".

In 2008, she left her band Peha to pursue a solo career.

== Discography ==
=== Albums ===
==== Studio albums ====
Year	Album details	Top positions		
Year	Album details	Charts		GSA
Year	Album details	SK	CZ	GSA
with IMT Smile
1997	Klik-Klak: Released: 1997; Label: Závodský/Škvrna (#167 013/210 059); Format: CD	—N/a	—	31
with Peha
1999	Niečo sa chystá: Released: 1999; Label: Bonton (#495 354); Format: CD	—N/a	—	—
2001	Krajinou: Released: 2001; Label: Epic (#500 740); Format: CD	—N/a	—	84
2003	Experiment: Released: 2003; Label: Epic (#511 320); Format: CD	—N/a	—	94
2005	Deň medzi nedeľou a pondelkom: Released: 2005; Label: B&M/Universal (#987 363/275 364); Format: CD	—N/a	7	8
Solo
2008	Zodiak: Released: December 1, 2008; Label: Universal (#179 399); Format: CD	—N/a	20	—
2012	Tajomstvá: Released: February 13, 2012; Label: Universal (#279 541); Format: CD	—N/a	9	—
"—" denotes an album that did not chart or was not released in that region.

==== Compilations ====
Year	Album	Charts	
Year	Album	SK	CZ
with Peha
2006	Best Of: Released: October 1, 2006; Label: Epic (#88697 02194); Format: CD	—N/a	8
2010	Donekonečna: Best of 1997–2010: Released: October 25, 2010; Label: Universal (#2755 161); Format: 2CD	—N/a	—
"—" denotes an album that did not chart or was not released in that region.

=== Singles ===
Year	Song	Charts				Album
Year	Song	SK		CZ		Album
Year	Song	50	100	50	100	Album
Airplay singles
2006	"Za tebou" with Peha	46	—	5	18	Deň medzi nedeľou a pondelkom
2006	"Deň medzi nedeľou a pondelkom" with Peha	—	—	10	39	Deň medzi nedeľou a pondelkom
2006	"Spomaľ" with Peha	17	80	1	1	Deň medzi nedeľou a pondelkom
2006	"Renesancia" with Peha	1	1	4	15	Deň medzi nedeľou a pondelkom
2007	"Opýtaj sa" with Peha	1	1	—	—	Deň medzi nedeľou a pondelkom
2007	"Muoj Bože"	1	1	1	1	Zodiak
2008	"Do batôžka"	7	16	—	—	Pocta Jarovi Filipovi: Jarove pesničky
2008	"Vo svetle žiariacich hviezd"	2	2	3	13	Zodiak
2009	"V tichu"	1	3	4	15	Zodiak
2009	"Píseň labutí" with Michal Hrůza	17	40	9	47	Napořád
2009	"V krajine zázrakov"	17	45	—	—	Zodiak
2010	"Všetko inak vyzerá"	4	15	—	—	Zodiak
2010	"Slovensko na nohy"	11	50	—	—	Donekonečna: Best of 1997–2010
2011	"To musí byť len láskou"	2	19	—	—	Tajomstvá
2011	"Zopár slov"	7	37	27	—	Tajomstvá
2012	"Zmier svetlo s tmou"	1	5	45	—	Tajomstvá
2013	"Zločin"	4	30	17	95	Tajomstvá
2013	"Keby"	5	43	—	—	Tajomstvá
2013	"Isabel"	4	41	13	67	
"—" denotes a single that did not chart or was not released in that region.

=== Other appearances ===
- 2011: Tante Cose da Veder with Petr Hapka, Michal Horáček & Ondřej Brzobohatý

== See also ==
- The 100 Greatest Slovak Albums of All Time
