= IMT Smile =

Slovak rock band

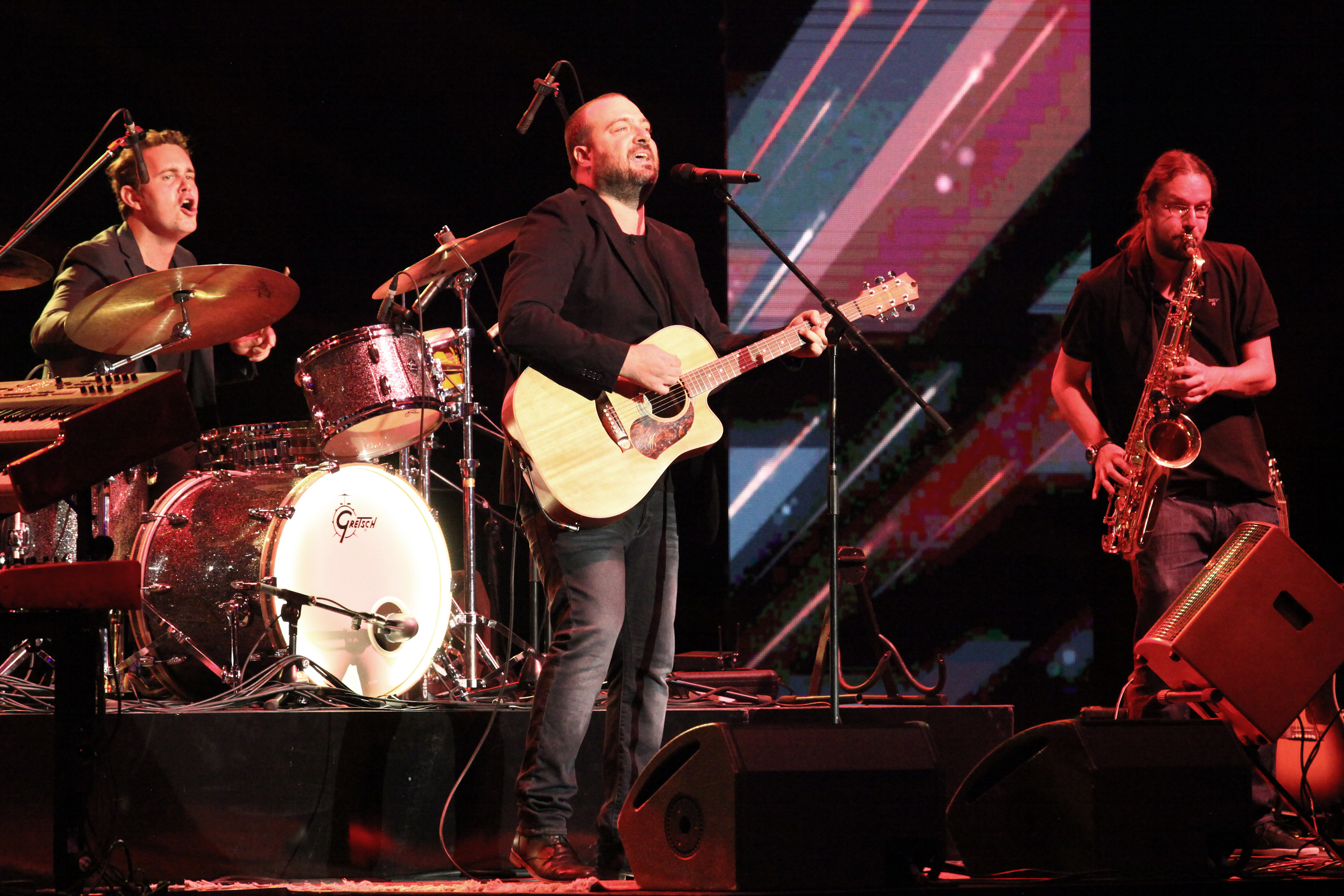
- IMT Smile performing in 2016

Background information
- Also known as: Epitath; Ruka
- Origin: Prešov, Czechoslovakia
- Genres: Rock; pop rock; alternative rock
- Years active: 1992–present
- Spinoffs: Peha
- Members: Ivan Tásler; Miro Tásler; Mário Garbera; Ivan Kormaňák; Pavol Jeňo; Martin Samuely
- Past members: Peter Bič; Martin Migaš; Martin Tkáčik; Katarína Knechtová; Martin Valihora; Viktor Špak; Peter Bartoník; Tomáš Slávik; Lukáš Kolivoška
- Website: imtsmile.com

IMT Smile is a Slovak rock band formed in 1992 by brothers Ivan and Miro Tásler (their initials provide the "IMT" in the band's name). They released their debut album, Klik-klak, in 1996, and as of 2026 have followed it with 13 more, as well as several live albums and compilations. The band has won numerous accolades throughout its career, including three ZAI Awards, two Slávik Awards, two Aurel Awards, three OTOs, and a Crystal Wing Award.

== History ==
=== Early days: 1992–1996 ===
I.M.T. Smile was formed in 1992 by brothers Ivan and Miro Tásler from Prešov, Slovakia, and their initials formed the band's name. They were joined by Miro's classmate Peter Bič on guitar and Martin Migaš on drums. They began recording songs in 1993, using the poetry of Ľubomír Feldek as lyrics. In 1994, musician, composer, and producer Robo Grigorov organized a competition called RG tip, which the band won with the songs "Pán v saku" and "Spím". In the following months, the foursome explored different musical genres and even changed their name, first to Epitath and later to Ruka, and they were joined by guitarist Martin Tkáčik.

In 1995, they performed at Rock FM Fest in Banská Bystrica with their largest lineup to date, which now included the vocal section of Miro Bórik, Marcela Kvašňáková, Jana Bednarčíková, and Viera Kollárová. A year later, Škvrna Records approached the group with the offer of a recording contract for five years and three albums. At this time, joined by vocalist Katarína Knechtová, the band recorded the singles "Nepoznám" and "Balada", which were produced by Ladislav Lučenič, who went on to also produce the band's debut album, Klik-klak, released in 1996.

=== Success: 1998–2001 ===
Migaš and Knechtová left the band in 1998 and went on to form the group Peha with members of 67th Harlem. Martin Valihora joined I.M.T. Smile on drums, and they released their second album, Valec, in October, which was later certified Gold, and the group won the ZAI Award for band of the year. In 1999, I.M.T. Smile launched an unplugged tour and collected several music awards, including a silver Slávik as band of the year. They also reissued Valec with bonus tracks under the title Valec Extra and held the Valec tour '99.

The Tásler brothers subsequently moved to Bratislava, and Ivan began working with Richard Müller, contributing to the latter's 2000 album, ...a hosté. Müller, along with Milan Lasica and Jaroslav Filip, made songwriting contributions to I.M.T. Smile's third studio album, Nech sa páči (2000), and in 2001, Tásler produced and co-wrote Müller's next record, '01, after which, I.M.T. Smile toured with Müller. The band completed two more tours and won another silver Slávik award for band of the year. Also in 2001, Ivan Tásler released his debut solo album, titled Tásler, or simply T, which was produced by Oskar Rózsa and included songwriting contributions from Müller and Filip.

=== Subsequent work: 2003–present ===
In 2003, I.M.T. Smile released an eponymous album, for which they received two Aurel Awards, both for album and band of the year. Their track "Kým stúpa dym" was nominated for best song, and Ivan Tásler won for best male singer. A year later, the band issued the album Exotica, credited as Ivan Tásler & I.M.T. Smile. At this stage, the band decided to simplify the way their name was written, removing the periods that followed the initials "IMT", and they have since been known as IMT Smile.

In 2005, the band published their first compilation, titled Diamant, and Ivan Tásler produced the debut album by SuperStar Search Slovakia singer Samuel Tomeček. IMT Smile followed up with their sixth studio album, Niečo s nami je, in 2006. They also experienced a number of personnel changes around this time, with the departure of Viktor Špak and longtime member Tomáš Okres, who went on to start their own band, Cirkus, and the return of Peter Bič. They also hired the young bass guitarist Lukáš "Kolja" Kolivoška. In 2007, they released their first live album, simply titled Live.

In 2008, IMT Smile published their seventh studio album, Hlava má sedem otvorov. This was followed by 2010: Odysea dva (2010), Rodina (2012), Na ceste 1979 (2015), Budeme to stále my (2018), Srdce rozum blvd (2021), Exoticana (2024), and Vianoce (2024).

In 2023, bassist Peter Bartoník died, and guitarist Tomáš Slávik left the band, to be replaced by returning guitarist Viktor Špak.

== Lawsuit ==
In 1999, shortly before the release of Valec Extra, Škvrna Records sued the band for alleged breach of an artistic collaboration contract related to the departures of Migaš and Knechtová without the label's consent, among other points. The case was ultimately not resolved.

== Awards and recognition ==
- ZAI Award for discovery of the year – 1996
- ZAI Award for band of the year – 1998
- ZAI Award for band of the year – 1999
- Silver Slávik for band of the year – 1999
- Silver Slávik for band of the year – 2001
- Aurel Award for album of the year
- Aurel Award for band of the year
- OTO Award for Music Band – 2014
- OTO Award for Music Band – 2015
- OTO Award for Music Band – 2016
- Crystal Wing Award in the category Popular Music – 2018

== Band members ==
Current

- Ivan Tásler – vocals, guitar
- Miro Tásler – keyboards, vocals
- Mário Garbera – saxophone, clarinet
- Ivan Kormaňák – drums
- Pavol Jeňo – trumpet
- Martin Samuely – bass

Past

- Peter Bič – guitar
- Martin Migaš – drums (1992–1998)
- Martin Tkáčik – guitar
- Katarína Knechtová – vocals (1996–1998)
- Martin Valihora – drums
- Viktor Špak – guitar
- Peter Bartoník – bass
- Tomáš Slávik – guitar
- Lukáš "Kolja" Kolivoška – bass

== Discography ==
Studio albums

- Klik-klak (1996)
- Valec (1998)
- Valec Extra (1999)
- Nech sa páči (2000)
- I.M.T. Smile (2003)
- Exotica credited as "Ivan Tásler & I.M.T. Smile" (2004)
- Niečo s nami je (2006)
- Hlava má sedem otvorov (2008)
- 2010: Odysea dva credited as "Ivan Tásler & I.M.T. Smile" (2010)
- Rodina credited as "Ivan Tásler & I.M.T. Smile" (2012)
- Na ceste 1979 credited as "Ivan Tásler & I.M.T. Smile" (2015)
- Budeme to stále my (2018)
- Srdce rozum blvd (2021)
- Exoticana (2024)
- Vianoce (2024)

EPs

- Príbeh Príbehov (2016)

Live albums

- Live (2007)
- 2010: Odysea Live (2010)
- Košice–Bratislava–Live! (2014)
- hiSTORY Live (2017)
- Východná with Kandráčovci (2018)
- Exotica Live 2004 (2024)

Compilations

- Diamant (2005)
- Best of I.M.T. Smile (2009)
- Universal Komplet Box 13 CDs (2012)
- Bestlove (2014)
- Acoustic Best (2015)
- hiSTORY 1996 – 2016 (2016)
- Aj to je život: B-strana a rarity & live (2020)
- Život 1998 – 2020 (2020)
- 30 x 30 (2022)
- Život človeka v roku 2022 (2022)

DVDs

- Letmý pohľad (2003)
