= Richard Müller (singer) =

Slovak singer and songwriter (born 1961)

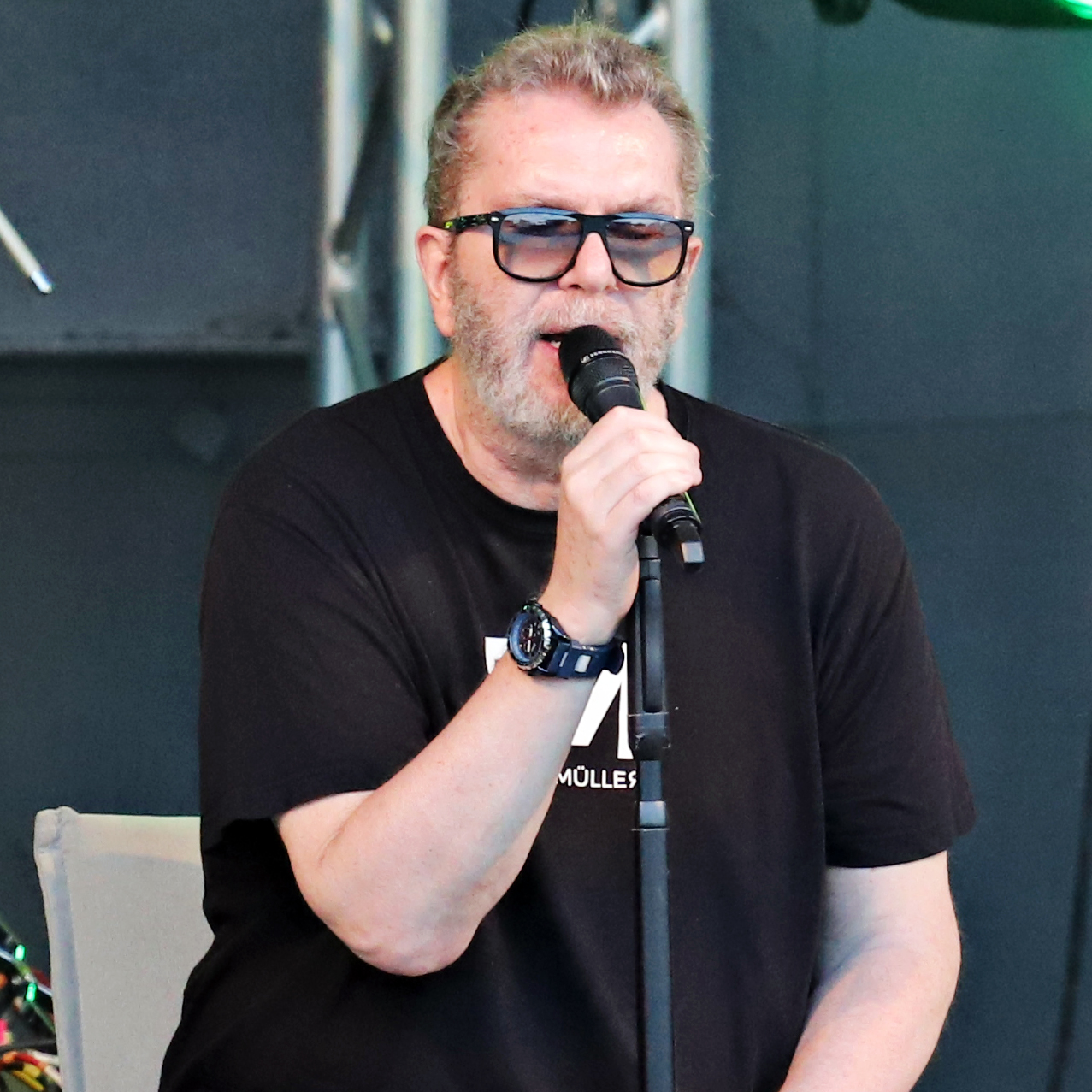
- Müller performing in 2023

Background information
- Born: 6 September 1961 (age 64); Hlohovec, Czechoslovakia (now Slovakia)
- Genres: Pop rock
- Occupations: Singer; songwriter; actor
- Instrument: Vocals
- Years active: 1984–present
- Formerly of: Banket
- Spouse: Soňa Müllerová (div. 2001)
- Partner: Vanda Wolfová
- Website: muller.sk

Richard Müller (born 6 September 1961) is a Slovak singer, songwriter, photographer, and occasional actor. He is one of the most successful singers in both Czechia and Slovakia, where he has sold more than one million records. At the beginning of his musical career, he was a member of Pavel Daněk's band Burčiak and later formed his own group, Banket, with whom he recorded three studio albums. He launched a solo career in the early 1990s and has issued sixteen studio albums as well as several compilations and live recordings. Müller collaborated with pianist Jaroslav Filip until the latter's death in 2000.

== Career ==
=== Banket: 1984–91 ===
Müller started his career as a music journalist. In the beginning of the 1980s, while studying drama and screenwriting at the Academy of Performing Arts in Bratislava, he started writing for the daily paper and the only specialized periodical at the time, Popular, and later for Gramorevue. His first song, "Radio", was recorded with Pavel Daněk's band Burčiak. The track found success on the charts, and this encouraged Müller to start his own band, called Banket, which also included Andrej Šeban. Their debut album, Bioelektrovízia (1986), included the song "Po schodoch", written by Vašo Patejdl. Banket released two more albums, Druhá doba?! (1988) and Vpred? (1990), before splitting up in 1991.

=== Theatre work ===
In 1988, Müller, together with Šeban, composed music for the play Kúpeľňový hráč, and in 1991, the duo released Baal, a soundtrack album to Bertolt Brecht's play of the same name.

=== Collaboration with Jaroslav Filip: 1994–2000 ===
Müller subsequently launched a solo career. He initially found success singing in Czech, including such songs as "Štěstí je krásná věc" and "Rozeznávám", but eventually switched to his native language. He released his debut album, Neuč vtáka lietať, in 1992, and followed it in 1994 with 33, his first collaboration with pianist and longtime friend Jaroslav Filip. The two went on to record LSD in 1996, Nočná optika in 1998, Koniec sveta in 1999, and ...a hosté in 2000, which was released a few months before Filip's death. Filip is credited on Müller's album '01, in memoriam, as a co-writer on several songs. The album's final track, "Planý poplach duše", is dedicated to his memory. The record also includes contributions from Ivan Tásler and Iva Bittová.

=== PPF, ...a hosté: 1995–2000 ===
In 1995, Müller again worked with Šeban as well as with Oskar Rózsa and Emil Frátrik, on a series of improvisations they called PPF. They recorded one album together, titled Po piči front, and released it the next year in limited format. Rózsa produced Müller's 2000 album, ...a hosté, which included Šeban on guitar, Filip on piano, as well numerous musical guests from Czechia and Slovakia, such as Ivan Tásler, Michal Horáček, David Koller, Robert Kodym, Anna K, Hana Hegerová, Petr Hapka, and Iva Bittová.

=== New York City recordings: 2003–06 ===
Müller's next three albums, Monogamný vzťah (2003), 44 (2005), and V.V. (2006), were recorded in New York City, with various American musicians. In 2005, he toured Czechia and Slovakia with the backing of drummer Omar Hakim, bassists Anthony Jackson and Will Lee, guitarists Hiram Bullock and Mike Caffrey, and keyboardist Clifford Carter. A selection of live recordings from this tour was subsequently released as 44: Koncert in 2007.

=== Return to Slovakia: 2007–present ===
After his return to Slovakia in 2007, Müller continued recording and performing. In 2010, he published the album Už (2010) and followed it a year later with Ešte. In 2013 and 2014, he recorded two albums with the Slovak a cappella vocal group Fragile, for which they won a Crystal Wing Award in 2013. In 2015, he collaborated with Michal Horáček and Michal Pavlíček, recording the album Socialní síť, which the duo had penned. In 2016, he released 55, in 2020, Hodina medzi psom a vlkom, and his latest album, Čierna Labuť Biela Vrana, came out in 2022.

=== Other activities ===
Müller has moderated various radio and television shows as well as appearing in a few productions as an actor, including the long-running Panelák, the 1998 film Rivers of Babylon, and 2015's Burácení.

He has also published two photography books: Amerika, Americký denník (1996) and Enter (2010).

== Personal life ==
Müller is the son of actor Vladislav Müller and actress Eliška Müller. He married TV announcer Soňa Müllerová in 1986, and the couple has a son and a daughter. They divorced in 2001. His current partner is Vanda Wolfová, with whom he has a son.

Müller has consumed illegal drugs since the 1990s. In a March 2000 television interview, he admitted to using marijuana, cocaine, and heroin. For this appearance, he was later charged by Slovak police with the crime of promoting drug use. His performance with the group IMT Smile the same month also led to controversy, as at one point in the show, Müller performed naked and demanded meth.

The singer also has bipolar disorder and has attempted suicide on several occasions.

== Awards and achievements ==
Müller has received nine Aurel Awards, one Artmedia Award, and three Gold Slávik Awards (as well as three Silver and five Bronze). Four of his solo albums are included in the 100 Greatest Slovak Albums of All Time, as are two Banket records. In 2013, he won a Crystal Wing Award together with the group Fragile.

== Discography ==
=== with Banket ===
- Bioelektrovízia (1986)
- Up the Stairs (English version of Bioelektrovízia, 1986)
- Druhá doba?! (1988)
- Vpred? (1990)
- Banket '84–'91 (compilation, 1991)
- Gold (compilation, 2005)

=== Solo ===
Studio albums

- Neuč vtáka lietať (1992)
- 33 (1994)
- LSD (1996)
- Nočná optika (1998)
- Koniec sveta (1999)
- ...a hosté (2000)
- '01 (2001)
- Monogamný vzťah (2004)
- 44 (2005)
- V.V. (2006)
- Už (2010)
- Ešte (2011)
- Socialní síť (2015)
- 55 (2016)
- Hodina medzi psom a vlkom (2020)
- Čierna Labuť Biela Vrana (2022)

EPs

- Slávnosť úprimných slov (1987) with Marika Gombitová, Vašo Patejdl, and Ján Lehotský

Compilations

- Retro (2002)
- Čo bolo, bolo (2006)
- Všetko (2011)
- Výberovka (2017)

Live albums

- Müllénium: Live (1999)
- 44: Koncert (2007)
- Koncert (2018)

=== Other recordings ===
- Baal with Andrej Šeban (1991)
- Po piči front with PPF (1996)
- Müller spieva Lasicu, Lasica spieva Müllera, Müller a Lasica spievajú Filipa with Milan Lasica (2008)
- Hlasy with Fragile (2013)
- Hlasy 2 with Fragile (2014)
- Hlasy Live with Fragile (2014)
