= Tanec Snov season 1 =

Tanec Snov
- Season 1
- Celebrity winner: Diana Mórová
- Professional winner: Andrej Krížik
- No. of episodes: 8

Release
- Original network: JOJ
- Original release: 8 March – 26 April 2015

Tanec snov is a Slovak reality television that premiered on March 8, 2015, on the television channel JOJ. The concept of the series presents nine local celebrities coupled with an equal number of dancers to "dance their dream" in common. Viliam Rozboril and Barbora Rakovská have been hosting the show since, while Eva Máziková, Ján Ďurovčík and Peter Modrovský, these were promoted as the judges for the series opening season. Apart from that, a guest judge will appear per episode too.

== Couples ==
The nine couples featuring selected celebrities and their dancing partners:

Celebrity	Occupation / Known for	Dance partner	Status
Ján Dobrík^{┼}	Actor	Dominika Geregová	Withdrew on March 22, 2015
Adriana Kmotríková	Newsreader	Peter Ruman	Eliminated 2nd on March 22, 2015
Andrea Heringhová	Model, Ex-Playmate	Michal Potocký	Eliminated 3rd on March 29, 2015
Mário "Kuly" Kollár	Singer	Lucia Wijacká	Eliminated 4th on April 5, 2015
Lukáš Latinák	Actor	Natália Kubičková	Eliminated 5th on April 12, 2015
Ivana Christová	Miss Czechoslovakia 1989	Radoslav Kováčik	Eliminated 6th on April 19, 2015
Rakby	Rapper	Veronika Fialová	Third Place on April 26, 2015
Kristína	Singer	Karol Kotlár	Runner-up on April 26, 2015
Diana Mórová	Actress	Andrej Krížik	Winner on April 26, 2015
^{┼} Due to a viral disease, Dobrík was replaced by actor Ján Koleník the second and his final week.

== Scoring charts ==
Couple	Place	1	2	3	4	5	6	7	8	
Couple	Place	1	2	3	4	5	6	7	Top 3	Top 2
Diana & Andrej	1	26	32	32	36	31+37=68	25+39=64	39+34=73	37+40=77	+39=116
Kristína & Karol	2	20	27	28	37	29+31=60	36+30=66	36+37=73	37+40=77	+39=116
Rakby & Veronika	3	13	22	27	25	29+26=55	28+32=60	33+38=71	37+35=72	
Ivana & Radoslav	4	24	23	32	31	28+26=54	35+35=70	29+28=57		
Lukáš & Natália	5	21	25	27	24	26+34=60	26+31=57			
Kuly & Lucia	6	20	23	23	29	23+23=46				
Andrea & Michal	7	21	18	24	21					
Adriana & Peter	8	20	25	24						
Ján & Dominika	9	20	33	—						

Red numbers indicate the lowest score for each week
Green numbers indicate the highest score for each week
the couple eliminated that week
the returning couple finishing in the bottom two
this couple withdrew from the competition
the winning couple
the runner-up couple
the third-place couple

=== Average score chart ===
This table only counts for dances scored on a 40-point scale.

Rank	Place	Couple	Total points	Dancing numbers	Average
1	1	Diana & Andrej	447	13	34.4
2	2	Kristína & Karol	431	13	32.9
3	4	Ivana & Radoslav	291	10	29.1
4	3	Rakby & Veronika	345	12	27.8
5	5	Lukáš & Natália	214	8	26.8
6	9	Ján & Dominika	53	2	26.5
7	6	Kuly & Lucia	141	6	23.5
8	8	Adriana & Peter	69	3	23.0
9	7	Andrea & Michal	84	4	21.0

=== Highest and lowest scoring performances ===
The best and worst performances in each dance according to the judges' 40-point scale are as follows:

Dance	Highest scored	Total points	Lowest scored	Total points
Cha-cha-cha	Kristína	36	Mário "Kuly" Kollár; Ján Dobrík	20
Waltz	Ivana Christová	35	Rakby	13
Quickstep	Ján Koleník	33	Ivana Christová; Mário "Kuly" Kollár	23
Rumba	Diana Mórová	40	Andrea Heringhová	18
Tango	Lukáš Latinák	34	Mário "Kuly" Kollár	23
Jive	Diana Mórová	32	Lukáš Latinák; Rakby	27
Slowfox	Diana Mórová	36	Lukáš Latinák	24
Samba	Kristína	40	Andrea Heringhová	21
Paso Doble	Ivana Christová	29	Mário "Kuly" Kollár	23
Salsa	Kristína	36	Diana Mórová	25
Viennese Waltz	Diana Mórová	39	Rakby	33
Folklore	Rakby	38	Ivana Christová	28
Argentine Tango	Diana Mórová	39	—N/a	—N/a
Sandungueo	Kristína	39	—N/a	—N/a
Showdance	Diana Mórová; Kristína; Rakby	37	-	-

=== Couples' highest and lowest scoring dances ===
Scores are based upon a potential 40-point maximum.

Couples	Highest scoring dance(s)	Lowest scoring dance(s)
Diana & Andrej	Rumba (40)	Salsa (25)
Kristína & Karol	Samba (40)	Waltz (20)
Rakby & Veronika	Folklore (38)	Waltz (13)
Ivana & Radoslav	Salsa & Waltz (35)	Quickstep (23)
Lukáš & Natália	Tango (34)	Cha-cha-cha (21)
Kuly & Lucia	Samba (29)	Cha-cha-cha (20)
Andrea & Michal	Tango (24)	Rumba (18)
Adriana & Peter	Rumba (25)	Waltz (20)
Ján & Dominika	Quickstep (33)	Cha-cha-cha (20)

=== Week 1 ===
Individual judges scores in the chart below (given in parentheses) are listed in this order from left to right: Ján Koleník, Ján Ďurovčík, Eva Máziková, Peter Modrovský.

Couples performed the waltz or cha-cha-cha.

Running order

Couple	Score	Dance	Music
Ján & Dominika	20 (7, 3, 5, 5)	Cha-cha-cha	"Blurred Lines" by Robin Thicke featuring T.I. and Pharrell Williams
Kristína & Karol	20 (6, 4, 6, 4)	Waltz	"Unchained Melody" by The Righteous Brothers
Kuly & Lucia	20 (6, 2, 7, 5)	Cha-cha-cha	"Y.M.C.A." by Village People
Adriana & Peter	20 (6, 3, 6, 5)	Waltz	"Moon River" by Andy Williams
Lukáš & Natália	21 (7, 2, 7, 5)	Cha-cha-cha	"Mercy" by Duffy
Andrea & Michal	21 (6, 3, 6, 6)	Waltz	"And I Love You So" by Don McLean
Ivana & Radoslav	24 (7, 5, 6, 6)	Cha-cha-cha	"All About That Bass" by Meghan Trainor
Rakby & Veronika	13 (6, 1, 4, 2)	Waltz	"I Wonder Why" by Curtis Stigers
Diana & Andrej	26 (7, 5, 7, 7)	Cha-cha-cha	"Sway" by The Pussycat Dolls

=== Week 2 ===
Individual judges scores in the chart below (given in parentheses) are listed in this order from left to right: Lucia Barmošová, Ján Ďurovčík, Eva Máziková, Peter Modrovský.

Due Ján Dobrík's injury, his dance partner Dominika will dance with actor Ján Koleník in week 2.

Couples performed the quickstep or rumba.

Running order

Couple	Score	Dance	Music	Results
Ivana & Radoslav	23 (7, 4, 6, 6)	Quickstep	"Valerie" by Amy Winehouse	Safe
Andrea & Michal	18 (7, 3, 5, 3)	Rumba	"Underneath Your Clothes" by Shakira	Safe
Kuly & Lucia	23 (8, 4, 6, 5)	Quickstep	"I'll Be There for You" by The Rembrandts	Safe
Lukáš & Natália	25 (8, 4, 7, 6)	Rumba	"Take My Breath Away" by Berlin	Eliminated
Kristína & Karol	27 (8, 6, 7, 6)	Quickstep	"You're the One That I Want" by Grease	Safe
Adriana & Peter	25 (8, 4, 7, 6)	Rumba	"She's Like the Wind" by Patrick Swayze	Safe
Ján & Dominika	33 (9, 6, 10, 8)	Quickstep	"I'm So Excited" by The Pointer Sisters	Safe
Rakby & Veronika	22 (7, 4, 5, 6)	Rumba	"Diamonds" by Rihanna	Bottom two
Diana & Andrej	32 (9, 6, 9, 8)	Quickstep	"Part-Time Lover" by Stevie Wonder	Safe

=== Week 3 ===
Individual judges scores in the chart below (given in parentheses) are listed in this order from left to right: Ján Dobrík, Ján Ďurovčík, Eva Máziková, Peter Modrovský.

Ján Dobrík and Dominika Geregová withdrew from the competition and were replaced by Lukáš Latinák and Natália Kubičková.

Couples performed the tango or jive.

Running order

Couple	Score	Dance	Music	Result
Ján & Dominika	—	Jive	"Do You Love Me" by The Contours	Withdrew
Lukáš & Natália	27 (8, 6, 8, 7)	Jive	"Jailhouse Rock" by Elvis Presley	Safe
Adriana & Peter	24 (7, 5, 7, 6)	Tango	"Buona Sera" by Louis Prima	Eliminated
Diana & Andrej	32 (9, 7, 8, 8)	Jive	"Candyman" by Christina Aguilera	Safe
Andrea & Michal	24 (7, 4, 7, 6)	Tango	"Blame" by Calvin Harris	Safe
Rakby & Veronika	27 (8, 5, 7, 7)	Jive	"Happy" by Pharrell Williams	Bottom two
Kuly & Lucia	23 (8, 4, 6, 5)	Tango	"Oh, Pretty Woman" by Roy Orbison	Safe
Kristína & Karol	28 (9, 7, 7, 7)	Jive	"Marry You" by Bruno Mars	Safe
Ivana & Radoslav	32 (9, 7, 8, 8)	Tango	"Money, Money, Money" by ABBA	Safe

=== Week 4 ===
Individual judges scores in the chart below (given in parentheses) are listed in this order from left to right: Adriana Kmotríková, Ján Ďurovčík, Eva Máziková, Peter Modrovský.

Couples performed the Slowfox or samba.

Running order

Couple	Score	Dance	Music	Result
Rakby & Veronika	25 (7, 4, 7, 7)	Samba	"La Bomba" by Ricky Martin	Bottom two
Diana & Andrej	36 (10, 7, 10, 9)	Slowfox	"Theme from New York, New York" by Frank Sinatra	Safe
Andrea & Michal	21 (7, 3, 6, 5)	Samba	"Macarena" by Los del Río	Eliminated
Lukáš & Natália	24 (8, 4, 6, 6)	Slowfox	"Don't Worry, Be Happy" by Bobby McFerrin	Safe
Kristína & Karol	37 (10, 8, 10, 9)	Samba	"Ai Se Eu Te Pego" by Michel Teló	Safe
Ivana & Radoslav	31 (9, 6, 8, 8)	Slowfox	"I'm Yours" by Jason Mraz	Safe
Kuly & Lucia	29 (9, 5, 9, 6)	Samba	"Fireball" by Pittbull featuring John Ryan	Safe

=== Week 5 ===
Individual judges scores in the chart below (given in parentheses) are listed in this order from left to right: Andrea Heringhová, Ján Ďurovčík, Eva Máziková, Peter Modrovský.

Couples performed unlearned dances and dance duel.

Running order

Couple	Score	Dance	Music	Result
Ivana & Radoslav	28 (9, 5, 7, 7)	Tango	"Santa María del Buen Ayre" by Philippe Cohen	Bottom two
Ivana & Radoslav	26 (9, 4, 7, 6)	Samba	"Tequila" by The Champs	Bottom two
Kuly & Lucia	23 (8, 3, 6, 6)	Tango	"Santa María del Buen Ayre" by Philippe Cohen	Eliminated
Kuly & Lucia	23 (8, 2, 7, 6)	Paso Doble	"Toreador Song" by Georges Bizet	Eliminated
Rakby & Veronika	29 (9, 3, 9, 8)	Quickstep	"Puttin on the Ritz" by Robbie Williams	Safe
Rakby & Veronika	26 (9, 3, 7, 7)	Jive	"Let's Twist Again" by Chubby Checker	Safe
Kristína & Karol	29 (9, 6, 7, 7)	Slowfox	"The Pink Panther Theme" by Henry Mancini	Safe
Kristína & Karol	31 (10, 5, 8, 8)	Jive	"Let's Twist Again" by Chubby Checker	Safe
Diana & Andrej	31 (10, 5, 8, 8)	Cha-cha-cha	"Lady Marmalade" by Labelle	Safe
Diana & Andrej	37 (10, 7, 10, 10)	Rumba	"I Just Can't Stop Loving You" by Michael Jackson	Safe
Lukáš & Natália	26 (9, 4, 7, 6)	Cha-cha-cha	"Lady Marmalade" by Labelle	Safe
Lukáš & Natália	34 (10, 6, 9, 9)	Tango	"El Tango de Roxanne" by Moulin Rouge!	Safe

=== Week 6 ===
Individual judges scores in the chart below (given in parentheses) are listed in this order from left to right: Mário "Kuly" Kollár, Ján Ďurovčík, Eva Máziková, Peter Modrovský.

Couples performed unlearned dances and Salsa.

Running order

Couple	Score	Dance	Music	Result
Diana & Andrej	25 (9, 5, 6, 5)	Salsa	"Bailando" by Enrique Iglesias	Bottom two
Diana & Andrej	39 (10, 9, 10, 10)	Viennese Waltz	"Když milenky pláčou" by Karel Gott	Bottom two
Lukáš & Natália	26 (9, 4, 7, 6)	Salsa	"Party Time!" by Gloria Estefan	Eliminated
Lukáš & Natália	31 (10, 6, 8, 7)	Samba	"Včielka Mája" by Karel Gott	Eliminated
Kristína & Karol	36 (10, 8, 9, 9)	Salsa	"Conga" by Gloria Estefan	Safe
Kristína & Karol	30 (10, 5, 8, 7)	Rumba	"Když muž se ženou snídá" by Karel Gott	Safe
Rakby & Veronika	28 (10, 4, 7, 7)	Salsa	"Mambo No. 5" by Lou Bega	Safe
Rakby & Veronika	32 (10, 6, 8, 8)	Samba	"Lady Carneval" by Karel Gott	Safe
Ivana & Radoslav	35 (10, 7, 10, 8)	Salsa	"Vivir Mi Vida" by Marc Anthony	Safe
Ivana & Radoslav	35 (10, 7, 9, 9)	Waltz	"Chci tě líbat" by Karel Gott	Safe

=== Week 7 ===
Individual judges scores in the chart below (given in parentheses) are listed in this order from left to right: Lukáš Latinák, Ján Ďurovčík, Eva Máziková, Peter Modrovský.

Couples performed unlearned dances and Folklore.

Running order

Couple	Score	Dance	Music	Result
Kristína & Karol	36 (10, 8, 9, 9)	Cha-cha-cha	"Hey! Baby" by Bruce Channel	Safe
Kristína & Karol	37 (10, 8, 10, 9)	Folklore	Slovak traditional music	Safe
Ivana & Radoslav	29 (8, 6, 8, 7)	Paso Doble	"España cañí" by Pascual Marquina Narro	Eliminated
Ivana & Radoslav	28 (8, 5, 8, 7)	Folklore	Slovak traditional music	Eliminated
Rakby & Veronika	33 (9, 7, 9, 8)	Viennese Waltz	"Hallelujah" by Leonard Cohen	Bottom two
Rakby & Veronika	38 (10, 8, 10, 10)	Folklore	Slovak traditional music	Bottom two
Diana & Andrej	39 (10, 9, 10, 10)	Argentine Tango	"Por una Cabeza" by Carlos Gardel	Safe
Diana & Andrej	34 (9, 6, 10, 9)	Folklore	Slovak traditional music	Safe

=== Week 8 ===
Individual judges scores in the chart below (given in parentheses) are listed in this order from left to right: Ivana Christová, Ján Ďurovčík, Eva Máziková, Peter Modrovský.

Couples performed unlearned dances, favorite dance and Showdance.

Running order

Couple	Score	Dance	Music	Result
Kristína & Karol	37 (10, 9, 9, 9)	Showdance	"A Little Less Conversation" by Elvis Presley	Runner-up
Kristína & Karol	40 (10, 10, 10, 10)	Samba	"Ai Se Eu Te Pego" by Michel Teló	Runner-up
Kristína & Karol	39 (10, 9, 10, 10)	Sandungueo	"Crazy in Love" by Beyoncé	Runner-up
Rakby & Veronika	37 (10, 7, 10, 10)	Showdance	"(I've Had) The Time of My Life" by Bill Medley and Jennifer Warnes	Third place
Rakby & Veronika	35 (10, 8, 9, 8)	Samba	"La Bomba" by Ricky Martin	Third place
Diana & Andrej	37 (10, 8, 10, 9)	Showdance	"Hey! Pachuco!" by Royal Crown Revue	Winner
Diana & Andrej	40 (10, 10, 10, 10)	Rumba	"I Just Can't Stop Loving You" by Michael Jackson	Winner
Diana & Andrej	39 (10, 9, 10, 10)	Samba	"Mas que Nada" by Jorge Ben Jor	Winner

== Dance chart ==
The celebrities and dance partners danced one of these routines for each corresponding week:

- Week 1: Cha-cha-cha or waltz
- Week 2: Quickstep or rumba
- Week 3: Tango or jive
- Week 4: Slowfox or samba
- Week 5: One unlearned dance and dance duels
- Week 6: One unlearned dance and salsa
- Week 7: One unlearned dance and Folklore
- Week 8: One unlearned dances, favorite dance and Showdance

Couple	Week 1	Week 2	Week 3	Week 4	Week 5		Week 6		Week 7		Week 8		
Diana & Andrej	Cha-cha-cha	Quickstep	Jive	Slowfox	Cha-cha-cha	Rumba	Salsa	Viennese Waltz	Argentine Tango	Folklore	Showdance	Rumba	Samba
Kristína & Karol	Waltz	Quickstep	Jive	Samba	Slowfox	Jive	Salsa	Rumba	Cha-cha-cha	Folklore	Showdance	Samba	Sandungueo
Rakby & Veronika	Waltz	Rumba	Jive	Samba	Quickstep	Jive	Salsa	Samba	Viennese Waltz	Folklore	Showdance	Samba	
Ivana & Radoslav	Cha-cha-cha	Quickstep	Tango	Slowfox	Tango	Samba	Salsa	Waltz	Paso Doble	Folklore			
Lukáš & Natália	Cha-cha-cha	Rumba	Jive	Slowfox	Cha-cha-cha	Tango	Salsa	Samba					
Kuly & Lucia	Cha-cha-cha	Quickstep	Tango	Samba	Tango	Paso Doble							
Andrea & Michal	Waltz	Rumba	Tango	Samba									
Adriana & Peter	Waltz	Rumba	Tango										
Ján & Dominika	Cha-cha-cha	Quickstep	Jive										
Legend	Highest scoring dance Lowest scoring dance Danced, but not scored												

== Reception ==
=== Critical response ===
The reality television received negative reviews from ČSFD.cz, a local review aggregator website devoted to film and news that includes TV content as well. As of April 8, 2015, the site's consensus reports 13 out of 100% based on 94 online reviews, with most of them criticizing the format as whole.

=== TV ratings ===
The broadcast of the show scored an average 22.5% ratings share among persons aged 12–54, attracting roughly 245,000 viewers in the demographic per episode. Ratings somewhat increased as the real-time event progressed after its pilot episode. The second and sixth sequel saw an increase of 2.3 and 1.6%, receiving an overall viewership of 262,000 and 241,000 respectively. Nevertheless, the title wouldn't make it to the top, stalling at No. 2 each night since.

In the general 12+ target group, the program provided a series of high ratings in a row, becoming the most watched prime time telecast in the region. On four out of six occasions to date, it was watched by more than half a million audiences, reaching the peak with 572,000 viewers for the fourth. The numbers dropped to the series-lowest 24.3% ratings share, or rather its least 488,000 viewers, upon its fifth instalment that felt on Easter Sunday. The following week, the show restored lost figures, achieving its highest share ever which exceeded 30%.

Episode	Original airing	Time slot (CET)	Viewership						
Episode	Original airing	Time slot (CET)	12–54 Share			12+ Share			Ref
Episode	Original airing	Time slot (CET)	Ranking	Ratings	Viewers	Ranking	Ratings	Viewers	Ref
1st	March 8, 2015	Sunday 08:30 pm	No. 2	22.0%	232,000	No. 2	27.1%	496,000	
2nd	March 15, 2015	Sunday 08:30 pm	No. 2	24.3%	262,000	No. 1	28.5%	526,000	
3rd	March 22, 2015	Sunday 08:30 pm	No. 2	22.8%	245,000	No. 1	27.1%	502,000	
4th	March 29, 2015	Sunday 08:30 pm	No. 2	23.1%	256,000	No. 1	29.9%	572,000	
5th	April 5, 2015	Sunday 08:30 pm	No. 2	19.3%	233,000	No. 2	24.3%	488,000	
6th	April 12, 2015	Sunday 08:30 pm	No. 2	23.6%	241,000	No. 1	30.5%	543,000	
7th	April 19, 2015	Sunday 08:30 pm	No. 2	24.3%	263,000	No. 1	31.4%	586,000	
8th	April 26, 2015	Sunday 08:30 pm	To be announced						
