= Zuzana =

Name list

Zuzana is a common female given name in the Czech Republic and Slovakia. It is often translated to other languages as Zuzanna (Polish), Zsuzsanna (Hungarian), Suzanne, Susan, or Susannah – all commonly derived from the Hebrew language name Shoshana, meaning "lily".

The nameday for people with this name is 11 August.

Both Czech and Slovak have initial stress and mark vowel length with acute accents, so the correct pronunciation of the name in the two languages is with the stress on the first syllable and with short vowels /'zuzana/.

There are several variations of the name. For example, the name is often shortened to Zuzka. For a child with the name Zuzana, one can also use the diminutive form Zuzanka. A modern nickname would be Zuzi.

People named Zuzana or Zuzanna include:

- Zuzana Brzobohatá (born 1962), Czech politician
- Zuzana Čaputová (born 1973), first woman president of Slovakia, lawyer, activist, politician
- Zuzana Chalupová (1925–2001), Serbian naïve painter
- Zuzanna Cieślar (born 2000), Polish fencer
- Zuzanna Czyżnielewska (born 1992), Polish volleyball player
- Zuzana Dolinková (born 1983), Slovak politician
- Zuzana Drdáková (born 1987), Slovak ice hockey player
- Zuzanna Famulok (born 2003), Polish swimmer
- Zuzanna Ginczanka (1917–1944), Polish-Jewish poet
- Zuzana Kečkéšová (born 1980), Slovak molecular biologist
- Zuzana Kirchnerová (born 1978), Czech film director
- Zuzana Licko (born 1961), Slovak-born American type designer, co-founder of Emigre
- Zuzanna Maciejewska (born 1995), Polish former tennis player
- Zuzana Maděrová (born 2003), Czech snowboarder
- Zuzanna Mazurek (born 1991), Polish swimmer
- Zuzana Mesterová (born 1989), Slovak politician
- Zuzana Navarová (1959–2004), Czech singer
- Zuzanna Orłowska (died after 1583), a mistress of Sigismund II Augustus, King of Poland
- Zuzana Paňková (born 2004), Slovak slalom canoeist
- Zuzana Plháková (born 1976), Slovak politician
- Zuzanna Radecka (born 1975), Polish sprinter
- Zuzana Remeňová (born 2000), Slovak biathlete
- Zuzana Rehák-Štefečeková (born 1984), Slovak sports shooter
- Zuzana Roithová (born 1953), Czech politician
- Zuzana Růžičková (1927–2017), Czech harpsichordist
- Zuzanna Shonfield (1919–2000), Polish-born British writer and historian
- Zuzanna S. Siwy (born 1972), Polish–American chemist
- Zuzanna Smykała (born 1990), Polish snowboarder
- Zuzanna Szadkowski (born 1978), Polish-American actress
- Zuzana Tomčíková (born 1988), Slovak retired ice hockey and ball hockey goaltender
- Zuzanna Topolińska (born 1931), Polish linguist
- Zuzana Tlučková (born 1962), Slovak actress
- Zuzana Tomas (born 1977), Slovak marathon runner
- Zuzana Zvolenská (born 1972), Slovak politician

== See also ==
- Susanne (disambiguation)
