= Tanec snov =

- Genre: Reality competition
- Based on: Tanec snov
- Directed by: Peter Ňunéz
- Presented by: Viliam Rozboril; Barbora Rakovská
- Judges: Ján Ďurovčík; Eva Máziková; Peter Modrovský
- Country of origin: Slovakia
- Original language: Slovak
- No. of seasons: 1
- No. of episodes: 8

Production
- Production location: Incheba Expo Aréna
- Running time: 60–80 minutes

Original release
- Network: TV JOJ
- Release: March 8 – April 26, 2015

Tanec snov was a Slovak reality television show that premiered on March 8, 2015, airing on the television channel JOJ. The series involves nine local celebrities who were each paired with professional dancer, competing each week to "dance their dream" for a panel of judges. Viliam Rozboril and Barbora Rakovská presented the show for its duration. Eva Máziková, Ján Ďurovčík and Peter Modrovský appeared as permanent judges throughout the season, with a guest judge featuring in each episode.

== Presenters ==
Key
Presenter of Tanec snov

Presenter	Series 1
Viliam Rozboril	
Barbora Rakovská	

== Judging panel ==
Key
Judging panel
Guest judge(s)

Judge	Series 1
Ján Ďurovčík	
Eva Máziková	
Peter Modrovský	
Ján Koleník	
Lucia Barmošová	
Ján Dobrík	
Adriana Kmotríková	
Andrea Heringhová	
Mário "Kully" Kollár	
Lukáš Latinák	
Ivana Christová	

== Series overview ==
Season	No. of stars	No. of weeks	Duration dates	Partners in the finals		
Season	No. of stars	No. of weeks	Duration dates	First place	Second place	Third place
(1) Spring 2015	9	8	Mar 8 – Apr 26	Diana Mórová & Andrej Krížik	Kristína & Karol Kotlár	Rakby & Veronika Fialová

== Reception ==
=== Critical response ===
The reality television received negative reviews from ČSFD.cz, a local review aggregator website devoted to film and news including TV content. As of April 8, 2015, the site's consensus reports 13 out of 100% based on 92 online reviews, with most of them criticizing the format as whole.

=== TV ratings ===
The first broadcast run of the show scored an average 22.5% ratings share among viewers aged 12–54, attracting roughly 245,000 viewers in this demographic per episode. Ratings somewhat increased following the pilot episode: the second episode saw an increase of 2.3%, receiving an overall viewership of 262,000. Nevertheless, the show never made it to the top ranked position for viewership, remaining at No. 2 for this category every week throughout the series.

In the general 12+ target group, however, the programme achieved a series of high ratings in a row, becoming the most watched prime time telecast in the country. Four out of six episodes to date were watched by more than half a million audiences, reaching a peak of 572,000 viewers for the fourth episode. Numbers dropped to a series low ratings share of 24.3%, representing just 488,000 viewers, upon the fifth instalment that felt on Easter Sunday of that year. The following week, the show restored lost viewing figures, achieving its highest ever ratings share, exceeding 30%.

Episode	Original airing	Time slot (CET)	Viewership						
Episode	Original airing	Time slot (CET)	12–54 Share			12+ Share			Ref
Episode	Original airing	Time slot (CET)	Ranking	Ratings	Viewers	Ranking	Ratings	Viewers	Ref
1st	March 8, 2015	Sunday 08:30 pm	No. 2	22.0%	232,000	No. 2	27.1%	496,000	
2nd	March 15, 2015	Sunday 08:30 pm	No. 2	24.3%	262,000	No. 1	28.5%	526,000	
3rd	March 22, 2015	Sunday 08:30 pm	No. 2	22.8%	245,000	No. 1	27.1%	502,000	
4th	March 29, 2015	Sunday 08:30 pm	No. 2	23.1%	256,000	No. 1	29.9%	572,000	
5th	April 5, 2015	Sunday 08:30 pm	No. 2	19.3%	233,000	No. 2	24.3%	488,000	
6th	April 12, 2015	Sunday 08:30 pm	No. 2	23.6%	241,000	No. 1	30.5%	543,000	
7th	April 19, 2015	Sunday 08:30 pm	No. 2	24.3%	263,000	No. 1	31.4%	586,000	
8th	April 26, 2015	Sunday 08:30 pm	To be announced						
