= Ostrov (Slovak TV series) =

Season of television series

- Presented by: Marián Mitaš
- No. of days: 42
- No. of castaways: 22
- Winner: Filip Ferianec
- Runner-up: Viera Šestáková
- Location: Caramoan, Philippines

Release
- Original network: Markíza
- Original release: 6 September – 8 December 2016

Season chronology
- ← Previous; Celebrity Camp Next → Česko & Slovensko

Ostrov (transl. "Island") is the first and only season of the Slovak version of Survivor. The show has 22 contestants competing in tribes of two who survive on an abandoned island, trying to survive nature and themselves. They compete in challenges where the losing tribe attends tribal council and votes one of their own out of the game. After 42 days, one will win a grand prize of €100,000 and win the title of Sole Survivor.

The season premiered on 6 September 2016 and concluded on 8 December 2016 where Filip Ferianec claimed victory after winning against Viera Šestáková in an 8-3 jury vote winning the title of Sole Survivor.

== Contestants ==
As a minor twist this season, amongst the contestants are sisters Kaja & Barbara Kowalczuková.

List of Ostrov contestants
Contestants	Original tribe	Switched tribe	Merged tribe	Voted out	Island of Hope	Finish
Marianna Srp; 32, Bojanovice, Czech Republic	Pula			3rd Voted Out; Day 9	Lost Duel; Day 10	22nd
Maja Giertlová; 23, Čierny Balog	Pula			4th Voted Out; Day 12	Lost Duel against "Rišo"; Day 14	21st
Mišo Sýkora; 23, Spišské Bystré	Pula	Pula		5th Voted Out; Day 15	Lost Duel; Day 16	20th
Anna Krištofová; 27, Banská Bystrica	Asul	Asul		6th Voted Out; Day 18	Lost Duel against "Rišo"; Day 19	19th
Dominik Turčan; 24, Bratislava	Pula	Pula	Dilaw	Quit due to Illness; Day 23		18th
Miro Štoffa; 28, Svidník	Asul	Asul	Dilaw	8th Voted Out; 1st Jury Member; Day 24		17th
Ľubica "Lulu" Kaločaiová; 19, Kokava nad Rimavicou	Asul			Lost Challenge; Day 1	Lost Duel against Kaja; Day 27	16th
Marek Zabák; 36, Veľké Zálužie	Pula	Pula	Dilaw	9th Voted Out; 2nd Jury Member; Day 27		15th
Peter "Španiel" Radačovský; 59, Košice	Pula	Pula	Dilaw	10th Voted Out; 3rd Jury Member; Day 30		14th
Richard "Rišo" Beňa; 42, Senica	Asul			1st Voted Out; Day 3	Lost Duel against Barbara; Day 30	13th
Barbara Kowalczuková; 20, Pukanec	Pula			Lost Challenge; Day 1	Lost Duel against Iveta; Day 32	12th
Marko Rovňák; 19, Sobrance	Asul	Asul	Dilaw	11th Voted Out; 4th Jury Member; Day 33		11th
Kristína "Kika" Jesenská; 31, Košice	Asul	Asul	Dilaw	12th Voted Out; 5th Jury Member; Day 35		10th
Iveta van Wingerden; 46, Čachtice	Asul	Pula		Lost Challenge; Day 22	Lost Duel against Yury; Day 36	9th
Daniela "Dada" Hlavatá; 25, Nové Mesto nad Váhom	Pula	Pula	Dilaw	13th Voted Out; 6th Jury Member; Day 38		8th
Yury Kabitskiy; 28, Trenčianska Teplá	Asul	Asul		7th Voted Out; Day 21	Lost Duel; 7th Jury Member; Day 40	7th
Kaja Kowalczuková; Returned to Game	Asul	Asul		Lost Challenge; Day 22	Won Duel; Day 40	
Ľubica Strelcová; Returned to Game	Pula			2nd Voted Out; Day 6	Won Duel; Day 40	
Štefan Štefan; 39, Kuzmice	Pula	Pula	Dilaw	Lost Challenge; 8th Jury Member; Day 40		6th
Kaja Kowalczuková; 23, Pukanec	Asul	Asul	Dilaw	Lost Challenge; 9th Jury Member; Day 40		5th
Ľubica Strelcová; 27, Bratislava	Pula		Dilaw	Lost Challenge; 10th Jury Member; Day 41		4th
Richard "Ricco" Chamula; 30, Vígľaš	Asul	Asul	Dilaw	Lost Challenge; 11th Jury Member; Day 41		3rd
Viera Šestáková; 25, Púchov	Pula	Asul	Dilaw	Runner-Up; Day 42		2nd
Filip Ferianec; 27, Trenčín	Asul	Asul	Dilaw	Sole Survivor; Day 42		1st
