= Sangat =

Sangat may refer to:

- Sangat (Sikhism), the Punjabi form of the Sanskrit term sangti, means company, fellowship and association
- Sangat (TV series), a 2015 Pakistani romantic drama serial
- Sangat, India, a city in Bathinda district in the Indian state of Punjab
- Sangat Island, a tiny island in the Philippines
- Sangat TV, a British television station for the Sikh community
- Sangat, a caste in the Newar caste system
