= Celebrity Camp =

- Presented by: Janko Kroner; Petra Polnišová
- No. of days: 23
- No. of castaways: 26
- Winner: Aneta Parišková
- Runner-up: Zora Czoborová
- Location: Sangat Island, Philippines
- No. of episodes: 24

Release
- Original network: TV JOJ
- Original release: April 4 – June 23, 2007

Additional information
- Filming dates: January 2007 – February 2007

Season chronology
- Next → Ostrov

Celebrity Camp was a Slovak reality show created by TV JOJ based on Survivor. Twenty-six celebrities were sent to the Philippines where they competed in two tribes in a series of challenges with the losing tribe going to Tribal Council to vote out one of its members.

A part of Survivor, Celebrity Camp was more about challenges than survival (contestants have luxury items and food on the beach), but it maintained some similarities with Survivor like tribe division, Tribal Council, and merge into one tribe. Each day contestants competed in a series of challenges and each night the losing tribe must vote out one of its members on Tribal Council. All episodes were shot in Philippines only last two episodes, starting with semi-final were shot in a studio in Slovakia. In the final not jury but public vote determined winner who won prize of 5,000,000 SKK (US$200,000).

== Contestants ==
List of Celebrity Camp contestants
Contestant	Original tribe	Switched tribe	Post-Mutiny tribe	Merged tribe	Finish
Natália Wallachová; 35, Fitness trainer, host	Red Tribe				1st voted out Day 1
Miroslav Noga; 47, Actor	Blue Tribe				2nd voted out Day 2
Eva Máziková; 57, Singer	Blue Tribe				3rd voted out Day 3
Zuzana Plháková; 30, Businesswoman	Red Tribe				4th voted out Day 4
Paviel Rochnyak; 23, Hair stylist	Blue Tribe				5th voted out Day 5
Johny Mečoch; 29, Dancer	Red Tribe				Quit; Day 6
Fedor Flašík †; 49, Businessman	Red Tribe	Red Tribe			6th voted out Day 8
Ján Lehotský; 59, Singer	Blue Tribe	Red Tribe			7th voted out Day 9
Silvia Šuvadová; 34, Actress	Red Tribe	Red Tribe			8th voted out Day 10
Štefan Maixner; 38, Footballer	Blue Tribe	Blue Tribe			9th voted out Day 11
Róbert Beňo †; 44, Politician	Blue Tribe	Blue Tribe			10th voted out Day 12
Karol Kučera; 33, Tennis player	Blue Tribe	Red Tribe	Red Tribe		Quit; Day 13
Ibrahim Maiga; Returned to game	Blue Tribe	Red Tribe	Red Tribe		11th voted out Day 14
Ivana Christová; 36, Miss Czechoslovakia 1989	Blue Tribe	Blue Tribe	Blue Tribe		12th voted out Day 15
Zuzana Hajdu; 31, TV host	Blue Tribe	Red Tribe	Red Tribe	Merged Tribe	13th voted out Day 16
Sagvan Tofi; 42, Actor	Red Tribe	Red Tribe	Red Tribe	Merged Tribe	14th voted out Day 17
Danica Jurčová; 30, Actress	Red Tribe	Red Tribe	Blue Tribe	Merged Tribe	15th voted out Day 18
Janette Drapáková; 36, Pavol Drapak's wife	Blue Tribe	Blue Tribe	Blue Tribe	Merged Tribe	16th voted out Day 19
Braňo Ondruš; 34, Host	Red Tribe	Red Tribe	Red Tribe	Merged Tribe	17th voted out Day 20
Pavol Drapák; 42, Singer	Blue Tribe	Blue Tribe	Blue Tribe	Merged Tribe	18th voted out Day 21
Ľudovít Kaník; 41, Politician	Red Tribe	Blue Tribe	Blue Tribe	Merged Tribe	Quit; Day 22
Ibrahim Maiga; 43, Actor, singer	Blue Tribe	Red Tribe	Red Tribe	Merged Tribe	19th voted out Day 22
Zuzana Belohorcová; 31, TV host	Blue Tribe	Red Tribe	Red Tribe	Merged Tribe	20th voted out Day 22
Karol Csino; 30, Actor, singer	Red Tribe	Blue Tribe	Blue Tribe	Merged Tribe	Lost challenge Day 23
Marek Ťapák; 46, Actor	Red Tribe	Blue Tribe	Blue Tribe	Merged Tribe	2nd runner-up
Zora Czoborová; 40, Fitness trainer	Red Tribe	Blue Tribe	Blue Tribe	Merged Tribe	Runner-up
Aneta Parišková; 32, News presenter	Red Tribe	Blue Tribe	Blue Tribe	Merged Tribe	Winner

== The game ==
Episode	Airdate	Challenges		Eliminated	Vote	Finish
Episode	Airdate	Reward	Immunity	Eliminated	Vote	Finish
1	April 4, 2007	Blue Tribe		Natália	5-5-2-1	1st voted out Day 1
2	April 7, 2007	Red Tribe		Miroslav	6-5-2	2nd voted out Day 2
3	April 11, 2007	Red Tribe		Eva	7-4-1	3rd voted out Day 3
4	April 14, 2007	Blue Tribe		Zuzana P.	6-6	4th voted out Day 4
5	April 14, 2007	Red Tribe		Paviel	7-2-1-1	5th voted out Day 5
6	April 18, 2007	Blue Tribe		Johny	2-1-1-1-1-1-1-1-1-1	Quit; Day 6
7	April 21, 2007	Red Tribe		None	5-5	Fake tribal council
8	April 25, 2007	Blue Tribe		Fedor	7-3	6th voted out Day 8
9	April 28, 2007	Blue Tribe		Ján	4-4-1	7th voted out Day 9
10	May 2, 2007	Blue Tribe		Silvia	2-2-1-1-1-1	8th voted out Day 10
11	May 5, 2007	Red Tribe		Štefan	5-5	9th voted out Day 11
12	May 9, 2007	Red Tribe		Róbert	5-2-2	10th voted out Day 12
13	May 12, 2007	Blue Tribe		Karol	3-1-1-1	Quit; Day 13
14	May 16, 2007	Blue Tribe		Ibrahim	2-2-1	11th voted out Day 14
15	May 19, 2007	Red Tribe		Ivana	5-1-1-1-1	12th voted out Day 15
16	May 23, 2007	None	Sagvan	Zuzana H.	7-6	13th voted out Day 16
17	May 26, 2007	Survivor; Auction	Braňo	Sagvan	8-3-1	14th voted out Day 17
18	May 30, 2007	Pavol	Marek	Danica	6-2-2-1	15th voted out Day 18
19	June 2, 2007	Marek	Pavol	Janette	5-5	16th voted out Day 19
20	June 6, 2007	Karol C., Braňo	Karol C.	Braňo	5-1-1-1	17th voted out Day 20
21	June 9, 2007	None	Karol C.	Pavol	4-2-1-1	18th voted out Day 21
22-24	June 13–23, 2007	None	None	Ľudovít	No vote	Quit; Day 22
22-24	June 13–23, 2007	None	Zuzana B.	Ibrahim	4-1-1	19th voted out Day 22
22-24	June 13–23, 2007	None	Marek	Zuzana B.	4-1	20th voted out Day 22
22-24	June 13–23, 2007	None	None	Karol C.	No vote	Lost challenge Day 23
22-24	June 13–23, 2007			Public vote		
22-24	June 13–23, 2007			Marek	2nd runner-up	
22-24	June 13–23, 2007			Zora	Runner-up	
22-24	June 13–23, 2007			Aneta	Winner	

== Voting history ==
Tribal phase (Day 1–15)

	Original Tribes							Tribe Swap Vote					Post-Mutiny Vote		
Episode #	1	2	3	4	5	6	7	8	9	10	11	12	13	14	15
Day #	1	2	6	4	5	6	7	8	9	10	11	12	13	14	15
Eliminated	Natália	Miroslav	Eva	Zuzana P.	Paviel	Johny	None	Fedor	Ján	Silvia	Štefan	Róbert	Karol K.	Ibrahim	Ivana
Vote	5-5-2-1	6-5-2	7-4-1	6-6	7-2-1-1	Quit	5-5	7-3	4-4-1	2-2-1-1-1-1	5-5	5-2-2	Quit	2-2-1	5-1-1-1-1
Voter	Vote														
Aneta	Zuzana P.			Zuzana P.		Zora	Janette				Štefan	Róbert			Ivana
Zora	Zuzana P.			Zuzana P.		Aneta	Janette				Štefan	Róbert			Ivana
Marek	Zuzana P.			Zuzana P.		Karol C.	Janette				Štefan	Róbert			Ivana
Karol C.	Zuzana P.			Zuzana P.		Marek	Janette				Štefan	Róbert			Ivana
Zuzana B.		Miroslav	Janette		Ján			Fedor	Silvia	Silvia			Braňo	Braňo	
Ľudovít	Johny			Johny		Braňo	Janette				Štefan	Róbert			Ivana
Pavol		Eva	Eva		Paviel		Marek				Zora	Aneta			Danica
Braňo	Natália			Johny		Ľudovít		Fedor	Ján	Zuzana H.			Zuzana H.	Ibrahim	
Janette		Miroslav	Eva		Paviel		Marek				Zora	Aneta			Ľudovít
Danica	Natália			Zuzana P.		Silvia		Zuzana H.	Zuzana H.	Karol K.					Karol C.
Sagvan	Marek			Johny		Fedor		Fedor	Ján	Ibrahim			Zuzana H.	Zuzana H.	
Zuzana H.		Janette	Janette		Ján			Fedor	Silvia	Braňo			Ibrahim	Ibrahim	
Ivana		Miroslav	Ibrahim		Ibrahim		Marek				Zora	Marek			Aneta
Ibrahim		Miroslav	Eva		Paviel			Fedor	Ján	Sagvan			Zuzana H.	Zuzana H.	
Karol K.		Eva	Eva		Paviel			Fedor	Silvia	Silvia			Sagvan		
Róbert		Janette	Eva		Paviel		Marek				Zora	Marek			
Štefan		Eva	Eva		Paviel		Marek				Zora				
Silvia	Natália			Johny		Danica		Zuzana H.	Ján	Zuzana H.					
Ján		Eva	Eva		Paviel			Fedor	Silvia						
Fedor	Natália			Johny		Sagvan		Zuzana H.							
Johny	Zuzana P.			Zuzana P.		Fedor									
Paviel		Miroslav	Janette		Janette										
Zuzana P.	Natália			Johny											
Eva		Miroslav	Janette												
Miroslav		Eva													
Natália	Marek														

Individual phase (Day 16–23)

	Merged Tribe												
Episode #	16	17	18	19	20	21	22-23						
Day #	16	17	18	19	20	21	22			23			
Eliminated	Zuzana H.	Sagvan	Danica	Janette	Braňo	Pavol	Ľudovít	Ibrahim	Zuzana B.	Karol	Marek	Zora	Aneta
Vote	7-6	8-3-1	6-2-2-1	5-5	5-1-1-1	4-2-1-1	Quit	4-1-1	4-1	Challenge	Public vote		
Voter	Vote												
Aneta	Zuzana H.	Sagvan	Danica 2x	Janette	Braňo	Pavol		Ibrahim	Zuzana B.		Winner		
Zora	Zuzana H. 2x	Sagvan	Danica	Janette	Braňo	Pavol		Ibrahim	Zuzana B.		Runner-up		
Marek	Zuzana H.	Sagvan 2x	Danica	Janette	Braňo	Zuzana B.		Ibrahim	Zuzana B.		2nd runner-up		
Karol C.	Zuzana H.	Janette	Danica	Janette	Braňo	Pavol		Ibrahim	Zuzana B.	Eliminated			
Zuzana B.	Zora	Sagvan	Karol C.	Marek	Ľudovít	Zora		Aneta	?				
Ibrahim							Returned	Karol C.					
Ľudovít	Zuzana H.	Janette	Danica	Janette	Braňo	Zuzana B.							
Pavol	Zora	Sagvan	Aneta	Marek	Marek	Marek							
Braňo	Zora	Zuzana B.	Ľudovít	Marek	Aneta								
Janette	Zora	Sagvan	Ľudovít	Marek									
Danica	Zora	Sagvan	Aneta										
Sagvan	Zuzana H.	Janette											
Zuzana H.	Zora												
