= Diana Mórová =

Slovak actress

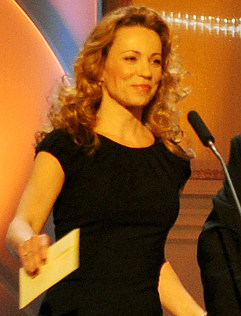
- Born: 18 February 1970 (age 56); Bratislava, Czechoslovakia
- Occupation: Actor
- Years active: 1972–present
- Employer: SND (1992–present)
- Children: 1
- Website: Slovak National Theater

Diana Mórová (born 18 February 1970) is a Slovak film and stage actress. Among other, she is the holder of two OTO Awards.

== Tanec snov ==
In 2015 she was part of dancing competition Tanec snov where she was paired with dancer Andrej Krížik.

Week #	Dance/Song	Judges' score				Result
Week #	Dance/Song	Guest judge	Ďurovčík	Máziková	Modrovský	Result
1	Cha-Cha-Cha/ "Sway"	7	5	7	7	No Elimination
2	Quickstep/ "Part-Time Lover"	9	6	9	8	Safe
3	Jive/"Candyman"	9	7	8	8	Safe
4	Slowfox/"Theme from New York, New York"	10	7	10	9	Safe
5	Cha-Cha-Cha/"Lady Marmalade"; Rumba/"I Just Can't Stop Loving You"	10; 10	5; 7	8; 10	8; 10	Safe
6	Salsa/"Bailando"; Viennese Waltz/"Když milenky pláčou"	9; 10	5; 9	6; 10	5; 10	Bottom two
7 Semi-final	Argentine Tango/"Por una Cabeza"; Folklore/Slovak traditional music	10; 9	9; 6	10; 10	10; 9	Safe
8 Final	Showdance/"Hey! Pachuco!"; Rumba/"I Just Can't Stop Loving You"; Samba/"Mas que Nada"	10; 10; 10	8; 10; 9	10; 10; 10	9; 10; 10	Winner

== Awards ==
Year	Nominated work	Award	Category	Result
2006	Herself	Stars on Ice		Won
2008	Herself	Crystal Wing Awards	Theater and Audiovisual Art	Won
2008	Herself	OTO Awards	TV Female Actor	Won
2010	Herself	Showdance		2nd Place
2010	Herself	OTO Awards	TV Female Actor – Drama	Nominated
2011	Herself	OTO Awards	TV Female Actor – Drama	Won
2013	Herself	OTO Awards	Female Actor	Nominated
