= Zuzana Kečkéšová =

Slovak-American molecular biologist

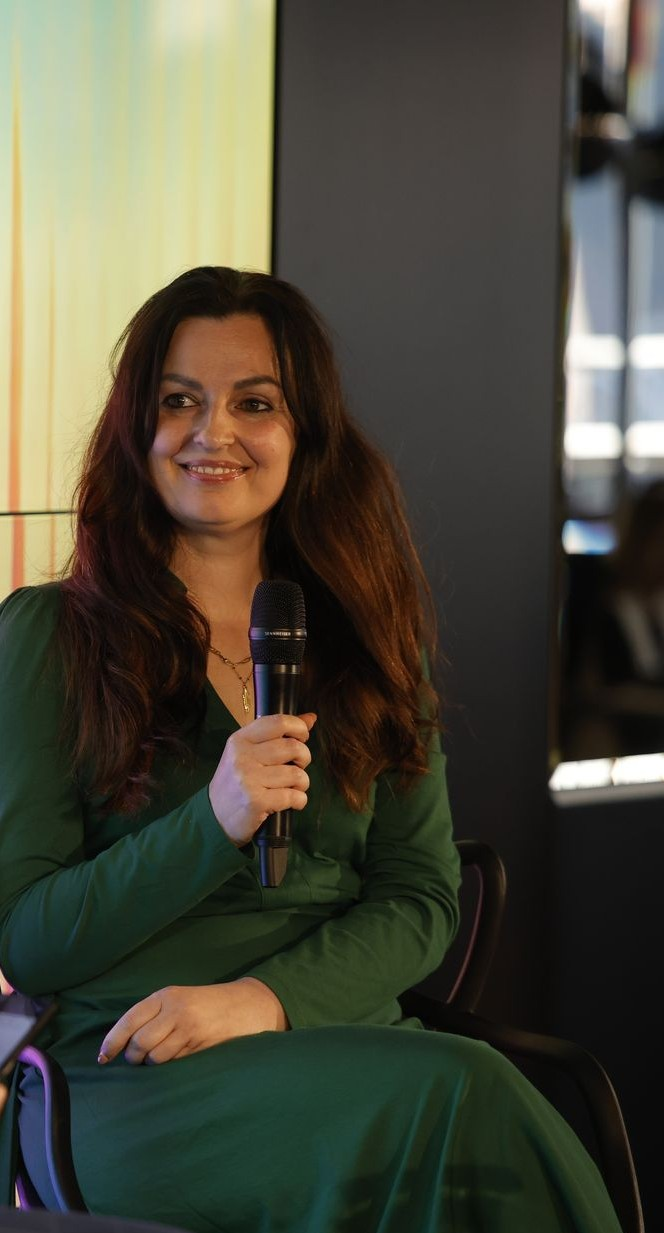
- Keckesova at Innovator 2025
- Education: Charles University in Prague; University College London
- Scientific career
- Workplaces: Czech Academy of Sciences; Massachusetts Institute of Technology
- Academic advisors: Robert Weinberg

Zuzana Keckesova (also published as Zuzana Kečkéšová) is a Slovak-American molecular biologist, cancer researcher, and biotechnology entrepreneur. She is Senior Group Leader at the Institute of Organic Chemistry and Biochemistry (IOCB Prague) of the Czech Academy of Sciences, where she leads a research program investigating tumor suppressor genes, mitochondrial biology, cancer metabolism, and translational approaches to cancer therapy. Her research has contributed to the understanding of epithelial plasticity, cancer stem cells, and the role of mitochondrial proteins in regulating tumor progression.

Keckesova is the founder of the biotechnology company Taveren Therapeutics, which develops therapeutics for the treatment of solid tumors.

She has received international recognition for her contributions to cancer research, including selection as an American Association for Cancer Research (AACR) NextGen Star and inclusion among Forbes Czechia's leading women scientists.

== Early life and education ==
Keckesova was born in Slovakia and holds Slovak and United States citizenship. She developed an interest in biology during secondary school, participating in science competitions before pursuing university studies in molecular biology, genetics, and virology.

She earned a Master of Science degree in Molecular Biology, Genetics and Virology from Charles University in Prague in 2003. Her graduate studies focused on molecular virology and host–virus interactions, laying the foundation for her subsequent research into retroviral biology and innate immunity.

She subsequently moved to the United Kingdom to undertake doctoral research at the Windeyer Institute of Medical Sciences, University College London (UCL), where she completed a Ph.D. in Infectious Diseases and Immunity in 2007 under the supervision of virologists Greg Towers and Robin Weiss. During her doctoral work she investigated host restriction factors that inhibit retroviral infection and contributed to the identification of mechanisms controlling species-specific resistance to human immunodeficiency virus (HIV).

As part of her doctoral training, Keckesova spent an academic year as a visiting researcher in the laboratory of Stephen Goff at Columbia University, where she investigated post-translational regulation of retroviral restriction factors. Following completion of her doctorate, Keckesova took a sabbatical year during which she travelled extensively before returning to scientific research.

In 2011 she enrolled in the Graduate School of Arts and Sciences at Harvard University as a visiting fellow and special student, pursuing studies in ancient Roman history and philosophy. Although she later returned to biomedical research, she has described this period as broadening her intellectual perspective and influencing her interdisciplinary approach to scientific thinking.

== Scientific career ==
=== Early research in retrovirology ===
Her early work addressed fundamental questions concerning the interaction between retroviruses and innate immune defense mechanisms

One of her earliest publications, appearing in the Proceedings of the National Academy of Sciences in 2004, demonstrated that the previously described retroviral restriction activities Ref1 and Lv1 are species-specific variants of the cytoplasmic protein TRIM5α. The study helped resolve competing hypotheses regarding mammalian antiviral restriction factors and became an important contribution to understanding innate resistance to HIV infection.

=== Whitehead Institute and Massachusetts Institute of Technology ===
In 2008 Keckesova joined the laboratory of Robert Weinberg at the Whitehead Institute for Biomedical Research and the Massachusetts Institute of Technology as a postdoctoral fellow. Her research shifted from virology to cancer biology, focusing on mechanisms governing stem cell identity, epithelial plasticity, tumor initiation, and metastasis.

== Independent research ==
=== Identification of LACTB as a tumour suppressor ===
While at the Whitehead Institute, Keckesova initiated an independent line of investigation where she introduced new concept in cancer research; to explore naturally cancer-resistant human tissues as unique model platforms to identify novel tumor suppressors. This work culminated in the discovery of new mitochondrial tumor suppressor LACTB that functions through regulation of mitochondrial lipid metabolism and cellular differentiation.Published in Nature in 2017, the study demonstrated that restoration of LACTB expression in aggressive breast cancer cells inhibited tumour growth by promoting differentiation and altering phospholipid metabolism rather than directly affecting cell proliferation. The findings identified a previously unknown mechanism of tumour suppression linking mitochondrial metabolism to cellular identity and established LACTB as a new focus of cancer biology.

=== Cancer stem cells and epithelial plasticity ===
Another focus of Keckesova's research has been the relationship between epithelial plasticity, stem-cell biology, and tumour progression. Building upon earlier work at MIT, her laboratory has investigated the molecular pathways that allow differentiated epithelial cells to acquire stem-cell characteristics associated with tumour initiation, metastasis, and therapeutic resistance.

=== Cancer tissue tropism, metabolism and translational oncology ===
Since establishing her independent laboratory at the Institute of Organic Chemistry and Biochemistry (IOCB Prague) in 2018, Keckesova has expanded her research programme to investigate metabolic vulnerabilities of cancer cells, identification of novel tumor suppressive pathways from cancer-resistant tissues and the therapeutic reactivation of dormant tumour suppresso.

== Entrepreneurship ==
Keckesova is the founder of Taveren Therapeutics, a biotechnology company established in December 2025 to develop novel therapeutics targeting tumour suppressor and oncogenic pathways for the treatment of solid malignancies.

Keckesova serves as the company's founding scientist and chief executive officer while maintaining her academic appointment at IOCB Prague.

== Other works ==
She is a member of the American Association for Cancer Research, the European Association for Cancer Research, and Women in Cancer Research. In 2018 Keckesova established her independent research group at the Institute of Organic Chemistry and Biochemistry (IOCB Prague), one of the Czech Republic's leading biomedical research institutions. Initially appointed as Junior Group Leader, she was promoted to Senior Group Leader in 2025.

She serves on the Editorial Advisory Board of Advanced Oncology.

Within the Czech scientific community, she has served on the Academic Council of the Czech Academy of Sciences, represented researchers in institutional governance, and participated in initiatives connecting scientific research with public policy and innovation.

== Awards and honours ==
She received the Qiagen Award in 2007 for the best doctoral project in the life sciences at University College London. During her postdoctoral training at the Whitehead Institute, she was awarded the Whitehead Institute Spirit Award (2010) in recognition of ethical conduct, collaboration, and contributions to the institute community.

In 2025, Keckesova was selected as one of the AACR NextGen Stars by the American Association for Cancer Research, an international distinction recognizing approximately ten early- to mid-career investigators worldwide for exceptional originality and innovation in cancer research. She was subsequently featured among Forbes Czech Republic's Top Female Scientists for her work on mitochondrial tumour suppressors and cancer therapeutics.

In 2026 she received the TOP Innovator Award CZ 2025, recognizing scientific innovation and technology transfer, and the TOP Women in Czechia Award 2025, honouring women whose achievements have had significant national impact in science, business, and public life.

== Selected publications ==
- Keckesova, Zuzana (2004). "The human and African green monkey TRIM5α genes encode Ref1 and Lv1 retroviral restriction factor activities". PNAS. 101 (29). et al.: 10780–10785. Bibcode:2004PNAS..10110780K. doi:10.1073/pnas.0402474101. PMC 490011. PMID 15249687.
- Keckesova, Zuzana; Ylinen, Laura M. J.; Towers, Greg J. (May 2006). "Cyclophilin A renders human immunodeficiency virus type 1 sensitive to Old World monkey but not human TRIM5 alpha antiviral activity". Journal of Virology. 80 (10): 4683–4690. doi:10.1128/JVI.80.10.4683-4690.2006. ISSN 0022-538X.
- Guo, Wenjun; Keckesova, Zuzana; Donaher, Joana Liu; Shibue, Tsukasa; Tischler, Verena; Reinhardt, Ferenc; Itzkovitz, Shalev; Noske, Aurelia; Zürrer-Härdi, Ursina; Bell, George; Tam, Wai Leong; Mani, Sendurai A.; van Oudenaarden, Alexander; Weinberg, Robert A. (2 March 2012). "Slug and Sox9 cooperatively determine the mammary stem cell state". Cell. 148 (5): 1015–1028. doi:10.1016/j.cell.2012.02.008. ISSN 1097-4172. PMC 3305806.*Keckesova, Zuzana (2017). "LACTB is a tumour suppressor that modulates lipid metabolism and cell state". Nature. 543 (7647). et al.: 681–686. Bibcode:2017Natur.543..681K. doi:10.1038/nature21408. PMC 6246920. PMID 28329758.
- Jakoube, Pavel; Cutano, Valentina; González-Morena, Juan M.; Keckesova, Zuzana (15 September 2021). "Mitochondrial Tumor Suppressors-The Energetic Enemies of Tumor Progression". Cancer Research. 81 (18): 4652–4667. doi:10.1158/0008-5472.CAN-21-0518. ISSN 1538-7445. PMC 9397617.
- Zhao, Jiang-Sha; Shi, Shuo; Qu, Hai-Yan; Keckesova, Zuzana; Cao, Zi-Jian; Yang, Li-Xian; Yu, Xiaofu; Feng, Limin; Shi, Zhong; Krakowiak, Joanna; Mao, Ruo-Ying; Shen, Yi-Tong; Fan, Yu-Meng; Fu, Tian-Min; Ye, Cunqi; Xu, Daqian; Gao, Xiaofei; You, Jia; Li, Wenbo; Liang, Tingbo; Lu, Zhimin; Feng, Yu-Xiong (February 2022). "Glutamine synthetase licenses APC/C-mediated mitotic progression to drive cell growth". Nature Metabolism. 4 (2): 239–253. doi:10.1038/s42255-021-00524-2. ISSN 2522-5812.
- Cutano, Valentina; Ferreira Mendes, Jessica Marianne; Escudeiro-Lopes, Sara; Machado, Susana; Vinaixa Forner, Judith; Gonzales-Morena, Juan M.; Prevorovsky, Martin; Zemlianski, Viacheslav; Feng, Yuxiong; Kralova Viziova, Petra; Hartmanova, Andrea; Malcekova, Beata; Jakoube, Pavel; Iyer, Sonia; Keckesova, Zuzana (January 2023). "LACTB exerts tumor suppressor properties in epithelial ovarian cancer through regulation of Slug". Life Science Alliance. 6 (1) e202201510. doi:10.26508/lsa.202201510. ISSN 2575-1077. PMC 9664245.
- Gonzalez-Morena, Juan M.; Escudeiro-Lopes, Sara; Ferreira-Mendes, Jessica Mariane; Jakoube, Pavel; Cutano, Valentina; Vinaixa-Forner, Judith; Kralova Viziova, Petra; Hartmanova, Andrea; Sedlacek, Radislav; Machado, Susana; Malcekova, Beata; Keckesova, Zuzana (February 2023). "LACTB induces cancer cell death through the activation of the intrinsic caspase-independent pathway in breast cancer". Apoptosis: An International Journal on Programmed Cell Death. 28 (1–2): 186–198. doi:10.1007/s10495-022-01775-4. ISSN 1573-675X. PMC 9950249.

== Personal life ==
Kečkéšová has two children.
