= Zuzana Plháková =

Slovak politician (born 1976)

Member of the National Council
- In office 15 October 2002 – 7 July 2006

Personal details
- Born: 14 April 1976 (age 50) Šurany, Czechoslovakia
- Party: Slovak Democratic and Christian Union
- Spouse: Miroslav Kondrlík
- Education: Comenius University

Zuzana Kondrlíková-Plháková (born 14 April 1976) is a Slovak lawyer and politician. She served as a Member of the National Council of Slovakia from 2002 to 2006.

== Early life ==
Plháková was born on 14 April 1976 in Šurany. She studied law at the Comenius University, graduating in 2001.

== Political career ==
In the 2002 Slovak parliamentary election, Plháková was elected MP on the list of the Slovak Democratic and Christian Union (SDKÚ) at the age of 26. She left the party the following years together with a group of fellow MPs, who later started the Free Forum party, but did not join and returned to SDKÚ. Plháková left the party again shortly after failing to retain her seat in the 2006 Slovak parliamentary election.

Plháková competed the reality show Celebrity Camp in 2007 before returning to politics as a member of HZDS formed by former prime minister Vladimír Mečiar. In summer 2024, she was arrested together with her husband in Budapest for driving a boat under influence and assaulting a police officer.

== Personal life ==
In 2004, Plháková married businessman Miroslav Kondrlík.
