= Zuzanna Czyżnielewska =

Polish volleyball player (born 1992)

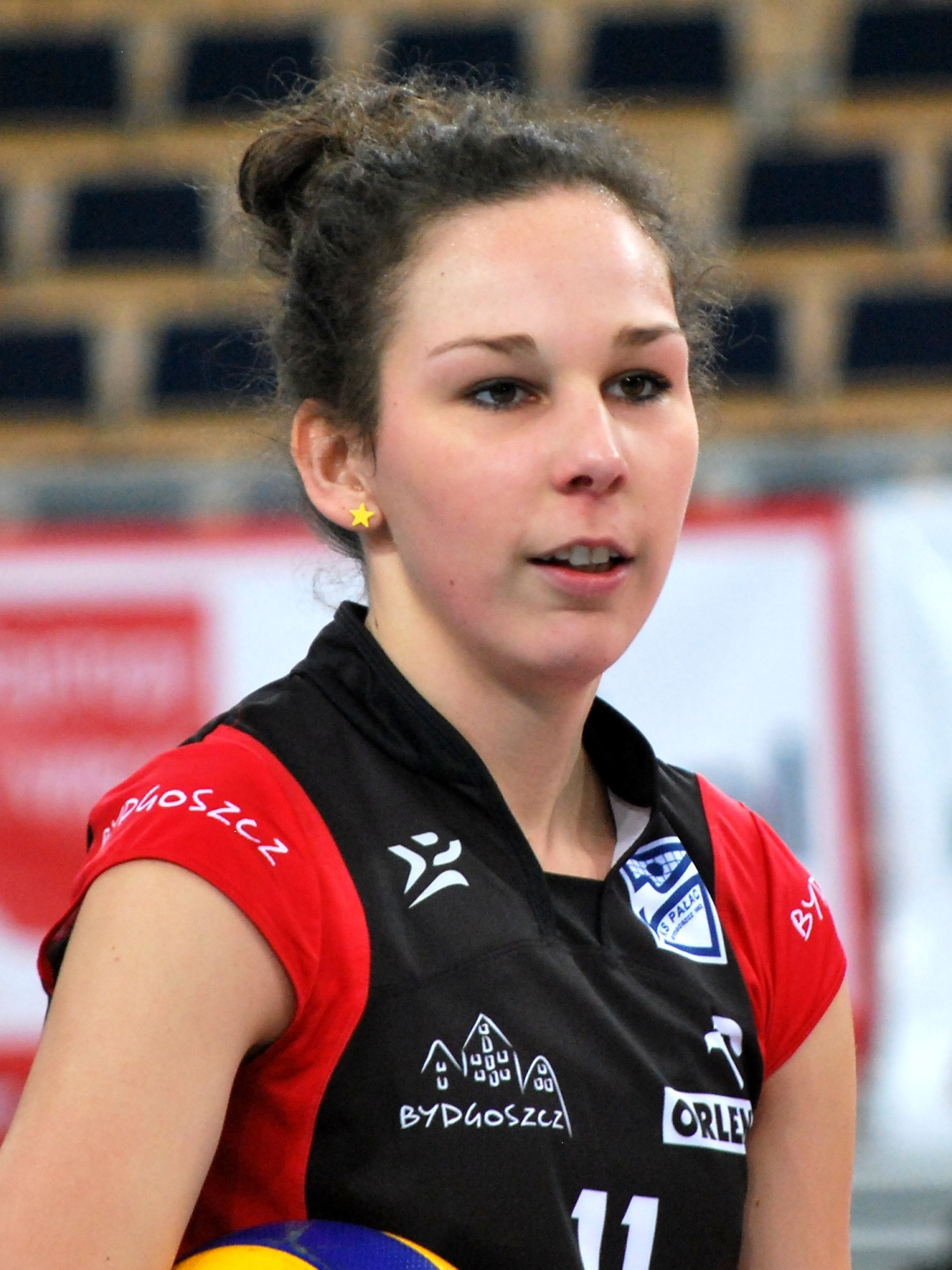

Personal information
- Nationality: Polish
- Born: 24 April 1992 (age 34)
- Height: 186 cm (73 in)
- Weight: 69 kg (152 lb)
- Spike: 300 cm (118 in)
- Block: 279 cm (110 in)

Volleyball information
- Position: Opposite

National team
- Years: Team
- 2015-: Poland

Zuzanna Czyżnielewska (born 24 April 1992) is a Polish volleyball player. She was part of the Poland women's national volleyball team.

She participated in the 2012 FIVB World Grand Prix.

On club level she played for SMS PZPS Szczyrkd.
