= Pukanec =

Pukanec Bakabánya
- Municipality
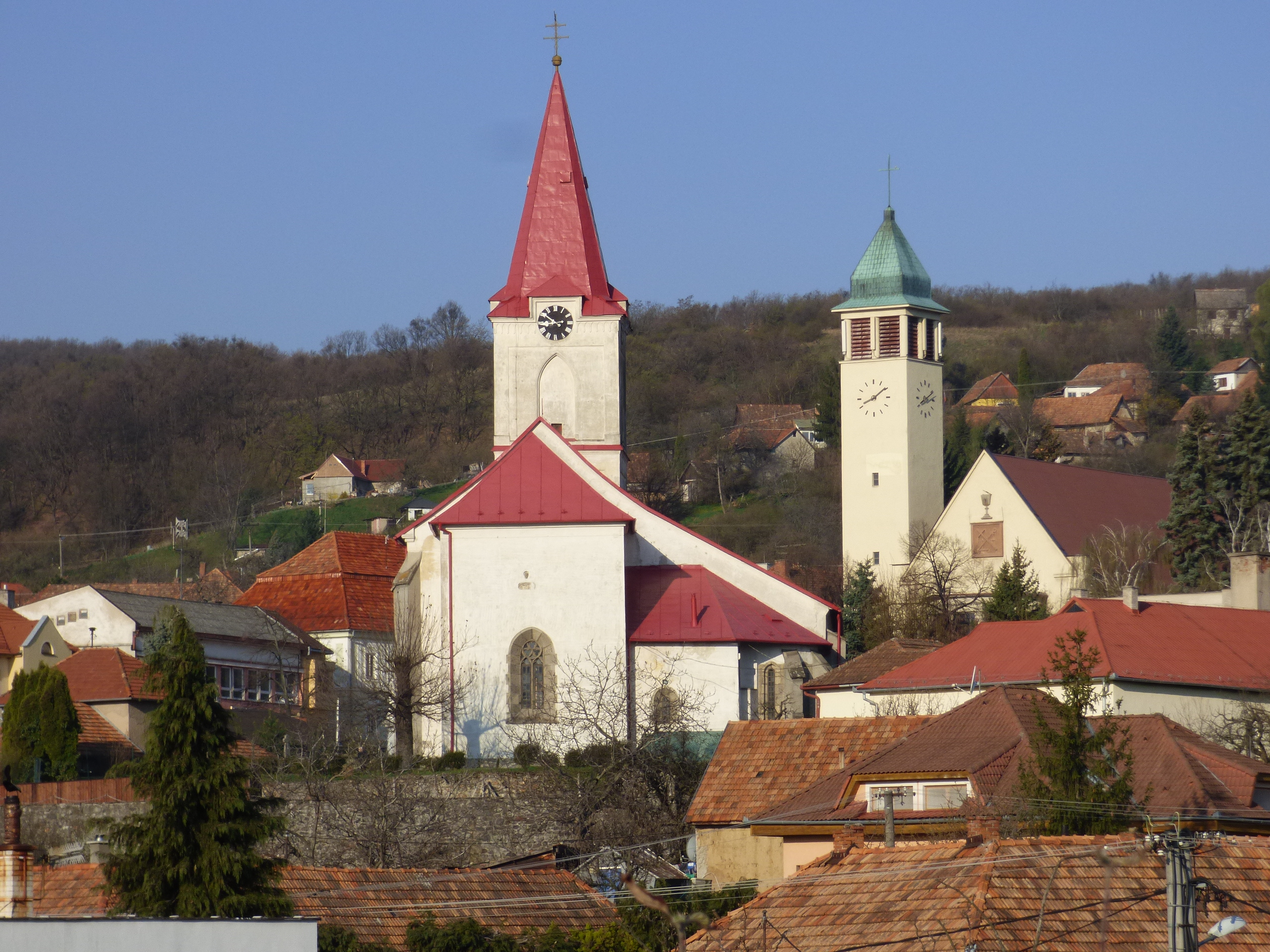
- A view over the ramparts on the churches of Pukanec.

- Flag

- Location of Pukanec in the Nitra Region Location of Pukanec in Slovakia
- Coordinates: 48.35°N 18.72°E
- Country: Slovakia
- Region: Nitra Region
- District: Levice District
- First mentioned: 1321

Government
  - Mayor: Ján Rievaj

Area
  - Total: 26.19 km^{2} (10.11 sq mi)
- Elevation: 352 m (1,155 ft)

Population (2025)
  - Total: 1,736
- Time zone: UTC+1 (CET)
  - Summer (DST): UTC+2 (CEST)
- Postal code: 935 05
- Area code: +421 36
- Vehicle registration plate (until 2022): LV
- Website: www.pukanec.sk

Pukanec (German: Bugganz / Puk(k)an(t)z, Hungarian: Bakabánya; Turkish: Bukabak) is a village and municipality (historical town) in the Levice District in the Nitra Region of southern Slovakia.

== Etymology ==
The name is probably derived from a personal name Baka, Bak, Bukan/Pukan or potentially from Slovak buk (beech).

== History ==
In the past, it was one of the nine free royal mining towns, where silver and other precious ore was mined. In historical records Pukanec was first mentioned in 1075 under the name villa Baka, a location in the region of today's Pukanec and Devičany. This note describes the borders of ownership of land given by the Hungarian King to the Monastery in Hronský Beňadik. Outside these borders there was a land of miners. And in this document there is only one "villa Baka" mentioned, which means that there was only one Baka - with Slovak inhabitants. Afterwards in later notes from the 11th and 12th centuries AD Nemeth and Toth Baka are mentioned as two separate settlements. The Toth Baka - the Slovak one, is older. And as far as is known the first German colonist arrived in the 12th century AD, which means that the mention from the year 1075 is a mention of Toth Baka, which is today's Devičany. As far as we know, the Nemeth Baka - the German one ("Nemeth" is a Hungarian word referring to Germans), was established later by Schwabian Germans. Today's Pukanec is descended from the German Baka. Lacking of records to put this to discussion, perhaps future systematic archaeological excavations will reveal the truth. The name Pukanec comes from Bukan which was the exclusive name of the grand noble family of Hont-Pázmány, the first known owner of Baka . In 1270 the first written mention about silver ore is made. In 1323, King Charles I of Hungary granted town rights to Pukanec. Just 22 years later, it became a free royal mining town. In 1405. King Sigismund declared a free mining enterprise and ordered to build fortifications. From 1424 until 1548, along with other mining towns it was property of queens. In April 1564, the Turks, attacking from the south, appeared below the city gates but were repulsed until 1 October 1640 when they successfully raided and sacked the town. The Turks also raided and sacked Pukanec in 1664. She was a sanjak of Uyvar eyalet as Bukabak for 22 years in Ottoman Empire. Those events marked the beginning of Pukanec's decline, when the mines were slowly depleted. Towards the end of the 18th century, only one mine was still rich in gold. The last record about mining in Pukanec was in 1842, though some mining activity continued until 1891. In 1876, Pukanec was demoted from the royal free mining town to a municipality belonging to the Hont county.

== Geography ==
The municipality lies at an altitude of 352 metres (1,155 ft) and covers an area of 26.19 km^{2} (10.11 sq mi) (2025). It is located near the Štiavnica Mountains, in the Sikenica river valley. It is located around 18 km northeast of Levice.

== Population ==
Population statistic (10 years)
Year	1995	2005	2015	2025
Count	2147	2077	1893	1736
Difference		−3.26%	−8.85%	−8.29%

Population statistic
Year	2024	2025
Count	1742	1736
Difference		−0.34%

It has a population of 1736 people (31 December 2025).

=== Ethnicity ===
Census 2021 (1+ %)
Ethnicity	Number	Fraction
Slovak	1634	91.95%
Not found out	117	6.58%
Romani	29	1.63%
Total	1777	

In year 2021 was 1777 people by ethnicity 1634 as Slovak, 117 as Not found out, 29 as Romani, 12 as Hungarian, 10 as Czech, 9 as Other, 4 as Italian, 4 as Russian, 4 as Polish, 4 as Moravian, 2 as Rusyn, 2 as German and 1 as Albanian.

Note on population: The difference values of population numbers in the table "Population statistic" and in the sections "Ethnicity" & "Religion" is caused by the use of various statistical methods.

=== Religion ===
Census 2021 (1+ %)
Religion	Number	Fraction
Roman Catholic Church	989	55.66%
None	369	20.77%
Evangelical Church	258	14.52%
Not found out	119	6.7%
Total	1777	

In year 2021 was 1777 people by religion 989 from Roman Catholic Church, 369 from None, 258 from Evangelical Church, 119 from Not found out, 15 from Greek Catholic Church, 6 from Paganism and natural spirituality, 6 from Ad hoc movements, 3 from Other, 2 from Eastern Orthodox Church, 2 from Church of the Brethren, 1 from Old Catholic Church, 1 from Calvinist Church, 1 from Jehovah's Witnesses, 1 from Christian Congregations in Slovakia, 1 from Islam, 1 from United Methodist Church, 1 from Czechoslovak Hussite Church and 1 from Buddhism.

The village is approximately 95.7% Slovak, 0.6% Hungarian, and 1.1% Romani.

== Facilities ==
The village has a public library, a gym and football pitch. It is also stated that the vineyards of Pukanec are home to a collection of Black Mulberry trees.
