= Ivana Christová =

Slovak model and singer (born 1970)

- Born: August 10, 1970 (age 56); Prešov, Czechoslovakia
- Occupations: Singer, model
- Years active: 1989–present
- Children: 1

Ivana Christová (born August 10, 1970) is a Slovak singer, businesswoman and former beauty queen. She was crowned as Miss Czechoslovakia 1989 and was first modern Miss in Czechoslovakia history. She also won international beauty contest Miss Maja International 1989.

== Television ==
Christová was part of few reality shows in Slovakia. She was in the cast for reality show Celebrity Camp. Christová was voted out in day 15 and finished in 13th Place.

== Tanec snov ==
In 2015 she was part of dancing competition Tanec snov where she was paired with dancer Radoslav Kováčik.

Week #	Dance/Song	Judges' score				Result
Week #	Dance/Song	Guest judge	Ďurovčík	Máziková	Modrovský	Result
1	Cha-Cha-Cha/ "All About That Bass"	7	5	6	6	No Elimination
2	Quickstep/ "Valerie"	7	4	6	6	Safe
3	Tango/"Money, Money, Money"	9	7	8	8	Safe
4	Slowfox/"I'm Yours"	9	6	8	8	Safe
5	Tango/"Santa María del Buen Ayre"; Samba/"Tequila"	9; 9	5; 4	7; 7	7; 6	Bottom two
6	Salsa/"Vivir Mi Vida"; Waltz/"Chci tě líbat"	10; 10	7; 7	10; 9	8; 9	Safe
7 Semi-final	Paso Doble/"España cañí" Folklore/Slovak traditional music	8; 8	6; 5	8; 8	7; 7	Eliminated
