= Rakby =

- Born: Ramón Beňo; 5 March 1989 (age 37); Nitra, Slovakia
- Genres: Hip Hop, Pop
- Occupation: Rapper
- Years active: 2005–present
- Website: RAKBY

Ramón Beňo (born in Nitra), better known by his stage name Rakby, is a Slovak rapper. He collaborates mainly with fellow Slovak rapper Bacil.

== Discography ==
Studio albums

- 2007: DEMO NR
- 2008: Našiel Som Cestu (I Found the way)

Studio albums (solo)

- 2009: EP Ticho Pred Búrkou (EP Silence before the storm)
- 2012: Príbeh ulice 2 (Story of street)

Studio album (with Bacil)

- 2012: Abnormal

=== Singles ===
Title	Year	Peak chart positions	Album
Title	Year	SNS IFPI	Album
"Ukáž mi." (featuring Bacil)	2012	12	Abnormal
"365 dní." (featuring Bacil and Nicole)	2012	7	Abnormal
"L.A.S.K.A." (featuring Dominika Mirgová)	2013	9	-
