= Sangat Island =

Island in Palawan, Philippines

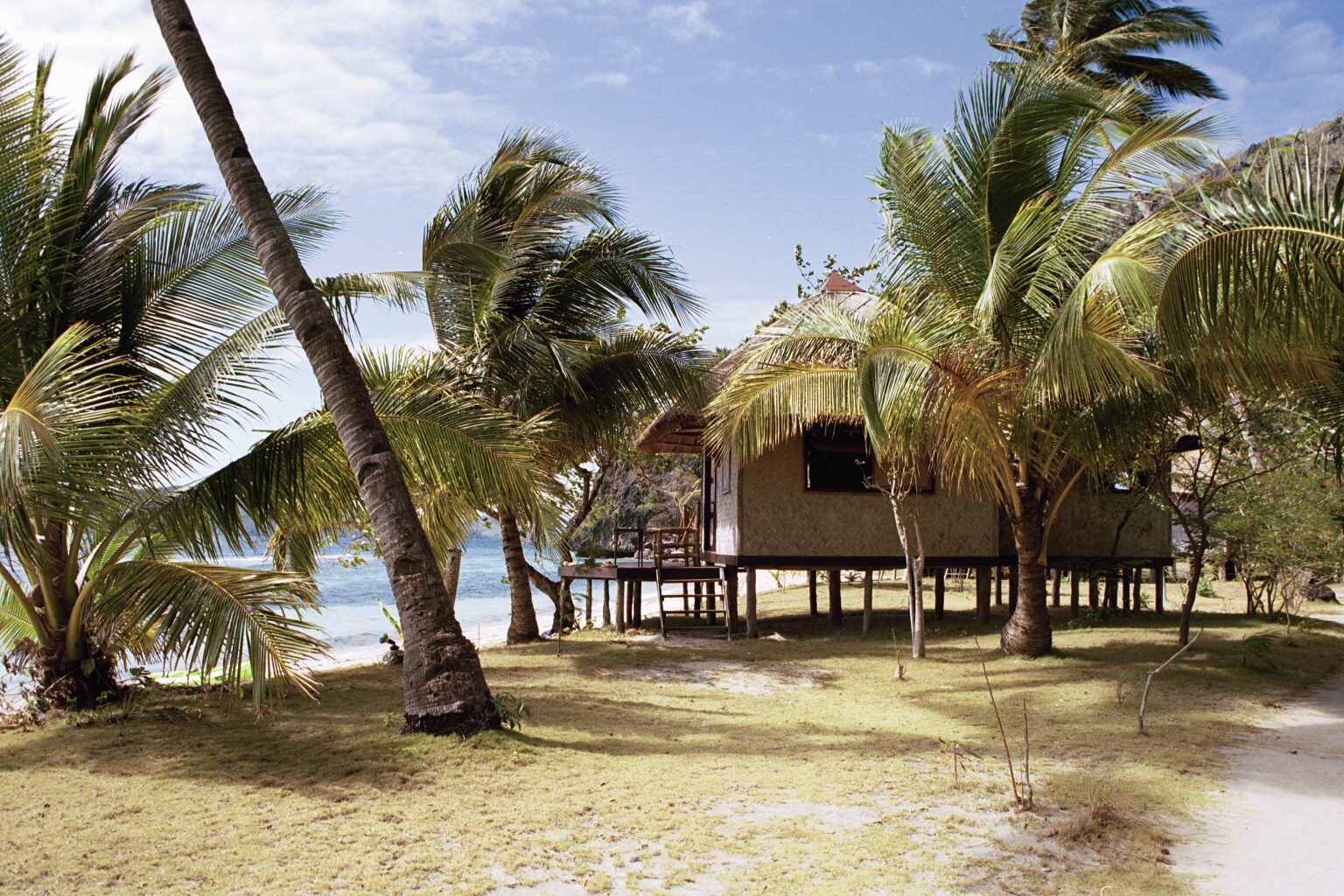
- The Sangat Island resort

- Location within Philippines

Geography
- Coordinates: 11°58′35″N 120°4′18″E
- Archipelago: Calamian Group of Islands
- Adjacent to: Sulu Sea

Administration
- Philippines
- Region: Mimaropa
- Province: Palawan

Sangat Island is a tiny island in the Philippines situated 2 kilometres (1.2 mi) off the coast of Busuanga close to Barangay Bintuan, Coron in the northern part of the Calamian Islands in the province of Palawan in the Philippines. The Calamian Islands are known for their many natural attractions and is a popular attraction for tourists and cruise lines.

Tourism is the main income for the local community and a significant part of the island has been transformed into a resort with rentable cottages and exclusive villas. The island attracts tourists and scuba divers.

There are 11 World War II shipwrecks nearby, some of which can be reached via snorkelling.

== See also ==
- List of islands of the Philippines
