= Aurel Awards =

Former Slovak music accolades

- Previous: Artmedia Awards; Next: ZAI Awards
- Type: Music
- Awarded for: Excellence in the music genre
- Country: Slovakia
- Presented by: IFPI Slovakia
- First award: 8 March 2002
- Final award: 27 May 2008
- Website: Aurel.sk

Television/radio coverage
- Network: Markíza (2001–2004); STV (2005–2006); Fun Rádio (SM–only, 2007)

The Aurel Awards were Slovak music accolades presented by Slovenská národná skupina Medzinárodnej federácie fonografického priemyslu (SNS IFPI) to recognize outstanding achievements in the industry for the preceding year in the region.

== History ==
- 1998–2000: Artmedia Awards held instead
- 2001–2007: Aurel Awards
- 2008–2010: Not held
- 2011–present: ZAI Awards held instead

== Categories ==
- Male Singer
- Female Singer
- Band
- New Artist
- Album
- Record
- Song
- Record Producer
- Music Video
- Instrumentalist
- Cover Art
- Alternative Music Artist • Held in 2005–2006.
- Hard Rock/Heavy Metal Music Artist • Punk included. Held in 2005–2006.
- Hip-Hop/Rap Music Artist • Held in 2005–2006.
- World Music Artist • Traditional folk and ethno included. Held in 2005–2006.
- Jazz/Bluess Music Artist • Held in 2005–2006.
- Gospel Music Artist • Held in 2005–2006.
- Contemporary Folk/Country Music Artist • Held in 2005–2006.

Special awards

- Lifetime Achievement • Given for outstanding contributions to the industry, mainly for performing.

== Ceremonies ==
The listed years are of official release, annual ceremonies were held the following year.

- 1st Aurel Awards (2001)
- 2nd Aurel Awards (2002)
- 3rd Aurel Awards (2003)
- 4th Aurel Awards (2004)
- 5th Aurel Awards (2005)
- 6th Aurel Awards (2006)
- 7th Aurel Awards (2007)

Chronological list of annual ceremonies of the Aurel and ZAI Awards, respectively, as held by
IFPI Slovakia (SNS IFPI) • Union of Authors and Performers (ZAI) • Music Fund Slovakia (HF) •
Year	Name	Date	Venue	Presenter(s)			Producer(s)	Broadcaster	Ref
1998		Artmedia Awards held instead		SNS; IFPI	ZAI	HF			
1999		Artmedia Awards held instead		SNS; IFPI	ZAI	HF			
2000		Artmedia Awards held instead		SNS; IFPI	ZAI	HF			
2001	Aurel Awards	8 March 2002	Istropolis, BA	SNS; IFPI			Forza	Markíza	
2002	Aurel Awards	7 March 2003	Istropolis, BA	SNS; IFPI			Forza	Markíza	
2003	Aurel Awards	5 March 2004	Istropolis, BA	SNS; IFPI			Forza	Markíza	
2004	Aurel Awards	4 March 2005	Istropolis, BA	SNS; IFPI			Forza	Markíza	
2005	Aurel Awards	22 March 2006	Sports Hall, Žilina	SNS; IFPI			ZetMedia & Petarda Production	STV	
2006	Aurel Awards	18 April 2007^{[A]}	Ice Stadium, Martin	SNS; IFPI			ZetMedia & Petarda Production	STV	
2007	Aurel Awards	May 27, 2008	West Theater, BA	SNS; IFPI			Street Production	Fun Rádio^{[B]}	
2008	Not held								
2009	Not held								
2010	Not held								—
2011	ZAI Awards held instead								
2012	ZAI Awards held instead								—
2013	ZAI Awards held instead								
2014	ZAI Awards held instead								—
Notes	Fri Wed Tue		BA denotes Bratislava						
A The 6th season of the Aurels preceded a genre awards ceremony, held Sunday, on 15 April 2007 at Malý Babylon, Bratislava.; B The final Aurels were transmitted live over the Internet only (with the streaming by local MeToo) as well radio waves.
