= 5th ZAI Awards =

Slovak music industry awards for 1994

5th ZAI Awards

- February 24, 1995
- PKO, Bratislava, Slovakia

Presenter
Union of Authors and Performers (ZAI)

Broadcaster
STV (delay)

Grand Prix
František Griglák

◄ 4th │ 6th ►

The 5th ZAI Awards, honoring the best in the Slovak music industry for individual achievements for the year of 1994, took time and place on February 24, 1995, at the Park kultúry a oddychu in Bratislava.

== Winners ==
=== Main categories ===
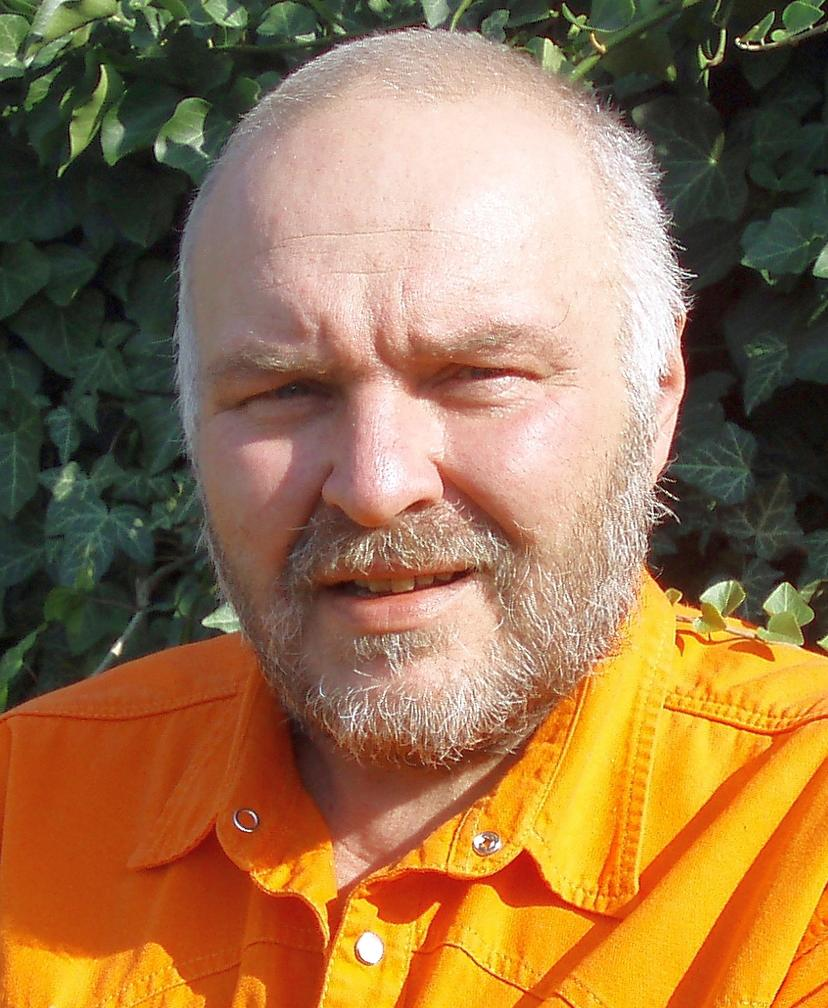
Daniel Mikletič

Vocal Artist or Ensemble	New Artist
★ Maduar	★ AYA
Instrumental Artist	Writer
★ Marek Minárik	★ Daniel Mikletič – "Lovci perál" (by Duo Haligali)
Album	Song
★ Príbeh – Dežo Ursiny	★ "Snívam o tebe" (by Salco) – Juraj Gahér • Pavol Novotný
Record	Producer
★ Stále hrám (by A. Mikušek) • Hex (by Hex) • Dance (by Salco) – Jozef Krajčovič	★ Andrej Šeban – Naspäť na stromy (by P. Lipa) • Part I (by Made 2 Mate)
Music Video
★ "Tequila Jumbo" (by M. Noga, Š. Skrúcaný) – Peter Sedlák

=== Others ===
Grand Prix	★ František Griglák
