= 6th ZAI Awards =

Slovak music industry awards for 1995

6th ZAI Awards

- March 2, 1996
- West Theater, Bratislava, Slovakia

Presenter(s)
- Union of Authors and Performers (ZAI)
- Music Fund Slovakia (HF)

Broadcaster
STV (delay)

Grand Prix
Marika Gombitová

◄ 5th │ 7th ►

The 6th ZAI Awards, honoring the best in the Slovak music industry for individual achievements for the year of 1995, took time and place on March 2, 1996, at the West Theater in Bratislava.

== Winners ==
=== Main categories ===
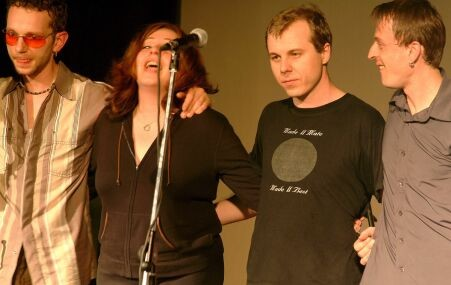
Made 2 Mate

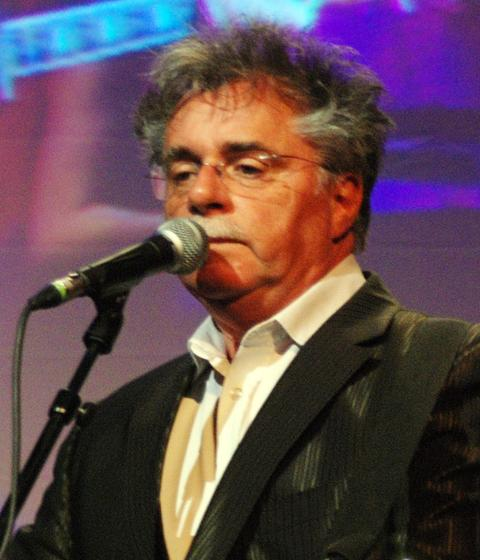
Pavol Hammel

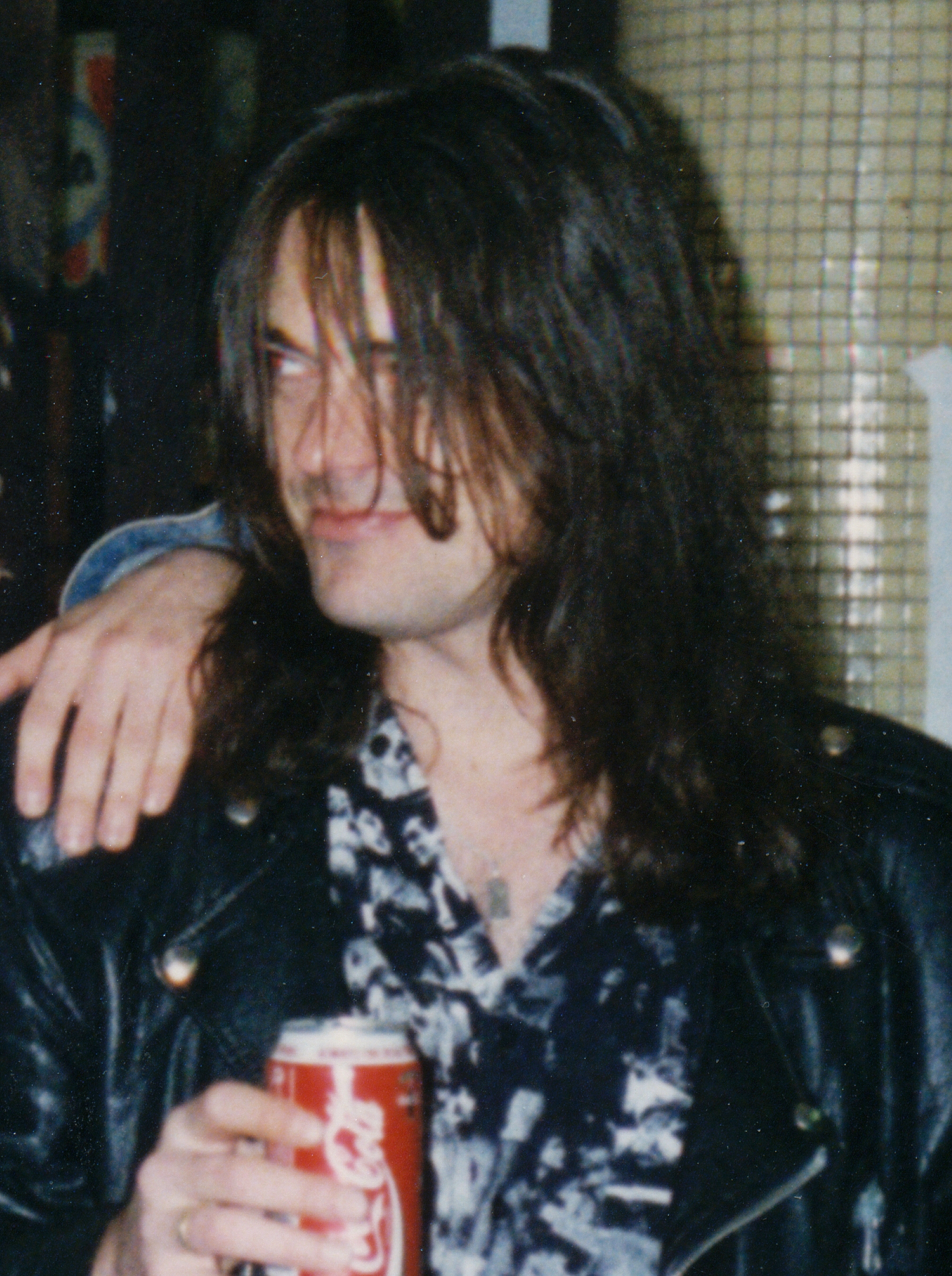
Peter Uherčík

Vocal Artist or Ensemble	New Artist
★ Made 2 Mate	★ O.B.D.
Instrumental Artist	Writer
★ Andrej Šeban	★ Daniel Hevier – "Keď sa baba zblázni" (by P. Habera)
Album	Song
★ Unplugged – Pavol Hammel	★ "Komáre" (by O.B.D.) – Roman Galvánek (lyrics) • O.B.D. (music)
Record	Producer(s)
★ U Can´t Stop (by MC Erik & Barbara) • Space (by Maduar) – Savid Studio	★ Juraj Černý • Dušan Giertl • Peter Uherčík (tie)
Music Video
★ "Balada o štyroch koňoch" (by P. Lipa) – Gratex Ltd.

=== Others ===
Grand Prix	★ Marika Gombitová
