= 13th ZAI Awards =

Slovak music industry awards for 2013

13th ZAI Awards

- February 13, 2014
- V-klub, Bratislava, Slovakia

Presenter(s)
Union of Authors and Performers (ZAI)
Hudba.sk (online poll-based awards only)

Producer
National Public Center (NOC)

Hall of Fame
Vladimír Juhanesovič

◄ 12th

The 13th ZAI Awards, honoring the best in the Slovak music industry for individual achievements for the year of 2013, took place on February 13, 2014, at the V-klub music club in Bratislava. The annual ceremony held in association of the National Public Center (NOC), was hosted by Martin Sarvaš, the chairman of the ZAI union.

Prior to the final nominations, 144 nominations were presented in the first round, totaling 127 nominees. There were 17 of these, which included musicians, 21 up-and-coming artists, 15 albums, 18 radio stations and hosts, 17 music festivals, 20 music venues, and 18 music presenters.

The event also included online poll-based Hudba.sk Awards, given by the local music portal, which is part of the Slovak search engine Zoznam.sk.

== Winners and nominees ==
=== Main categories ===
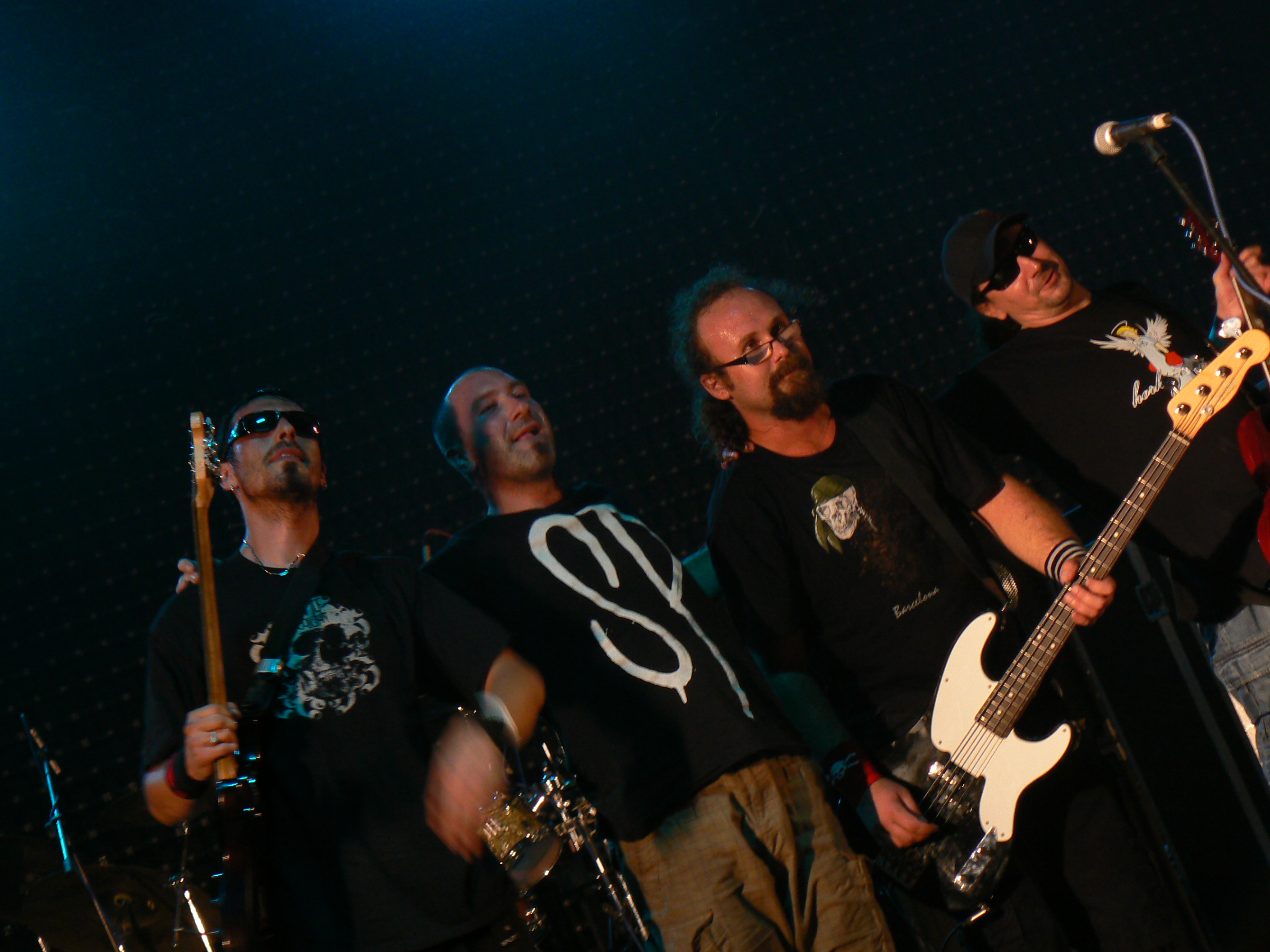
Horkýže Slíže

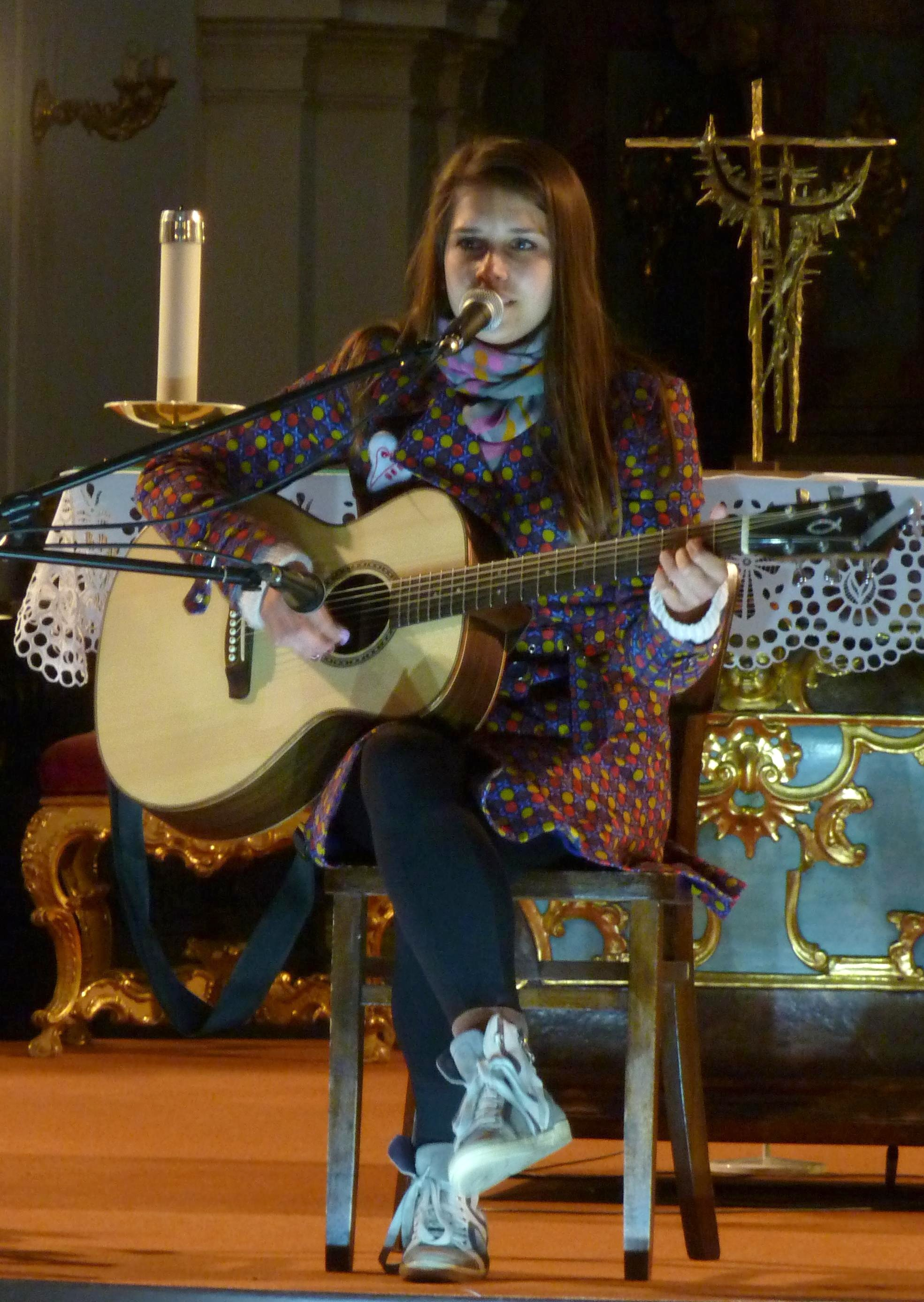
Simona Martausová

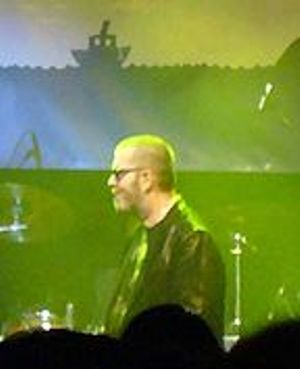
Richard Müller

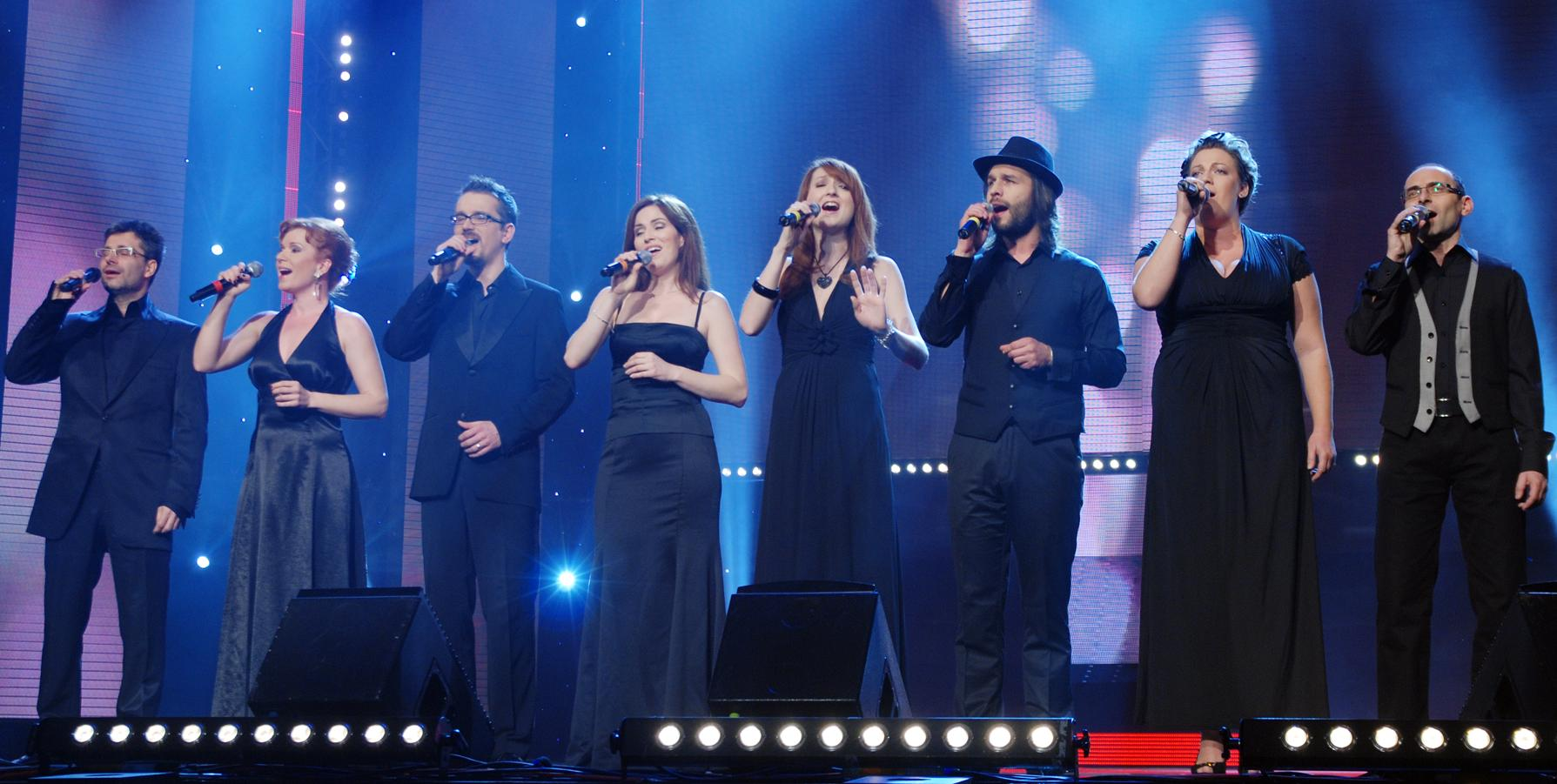
Fragile

| Vocal Artist or Ensemble | New Artist |
|---|---|
| ★ Horkýže Slíže: Celeste Buckingham; Hex; IMT Smile; Jana Kirschner; Zuzana Smatanová | ★ Simona Martausová: BijouTerrier; Korben Dallas |
Album
★ Hlasy – Richard Müller • Fragile; Všetko najlepšie – Hex; St. Mary Huana Ganja – Horkýže Slíže; Moruša Biela – Jana Kirschner; Momenty 2003-2013 – Zuzana Smatanová
| Radio Station | Radio Host |
| ★ Rádio Slovensko (SRo1) – Bratislava: Rádio Max – Nitra; Rádio Regina (SRo2) – Bratislava; Rádio Rocková republika – Bratislava; Rádio Viva Metropol – Bratislava | ★ Roman Bomboš (RTVS): Vladimír Franc (RTVS); Soňa Horňáková (RTVS); Rastislav Očenáš (RRR) |
| Music Festival | Music Club |
| ★ Topfest – Piešťany: Červeník Fest – Červeník; Pohoda – Trenčín; Slížovica – Nitra | ★ Ateliér Babylon – Bratislava: Blue Note – Nové Mesto nad Váhom; Nová Pekáreň – Nitra |
Music Presenter
★ Dušan Drobný – Agentúra Duna, Piešťany; Rudolf Hošna – Ateliér Babylon, Bratislava; Tibor Zelenay – Blue Note, Nové Mesto nad Váhom

=== Others ===
| Hall of Fame | ★ Vladimír Juhanesovič |
