= 2nd ZAI Awards =

Slovak music industry awards for 1991

2nd ZAI Awards

- 1992
- Bratislava, Slovakia

Presenter
Union of Authors and Performers (ZAI)

Broadcaster
STV (delay)

Grand Prix
Pavol Hammel

◄ 1st │ 3rd ►

The 2nd ZAI Awards, honoring the best in the Slovak music industry for individual achievements for the year of 1991, took place and time in Bratislava in 1992.

== Winners ==
=== Main categories ===
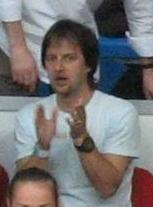
Pavol Habera

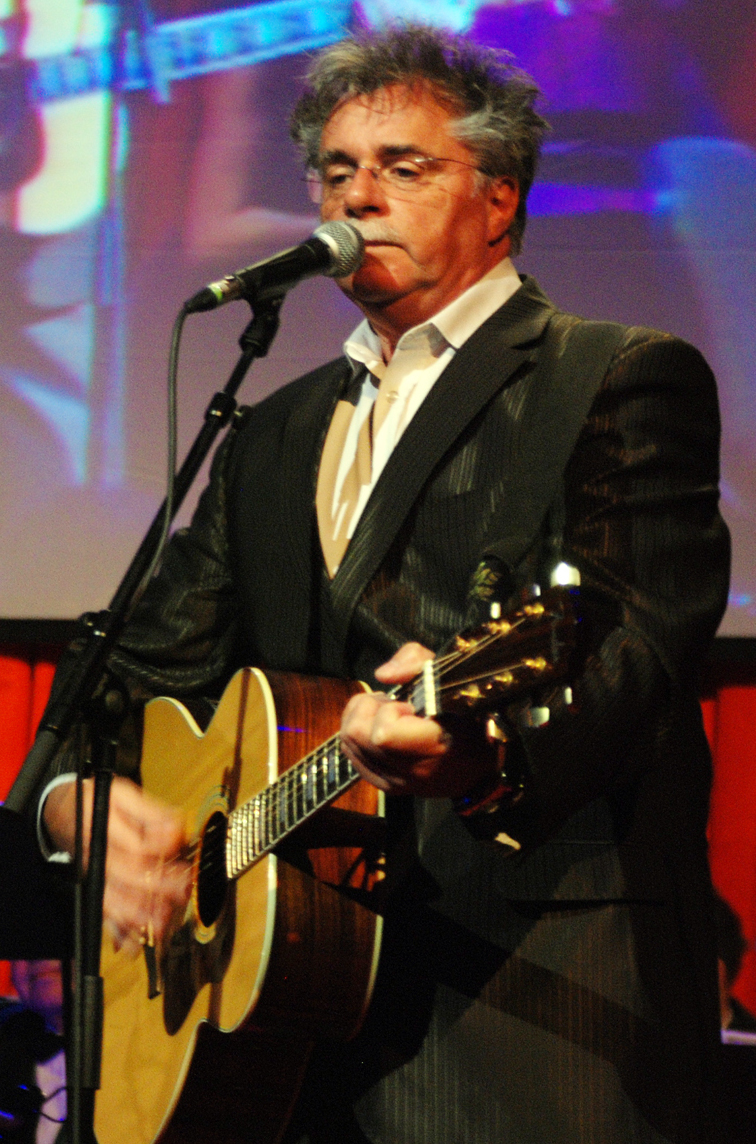
Pavol Hammel

Vocal Artist or Ensemble	New Artist
★ Pavol Habera	★ Hex
Instrumental Artist	Writer
★ František Griglák	★ Martin Sarvaš – "Matka" (by Tublatanka) • "Ostrov pokladov" (by Isabelle)
Album	Song
★ Simile – Fermata	★ "Spomienka na Amsterdam" (by Fermata) – František Griglák (instrumental)
Record	Producer
★ Simile (by Fermata) – Ivan Minárik • Daniel Habovštiak	★ Július Kinček – (Unknown)
Music Video
★ "Unknown" – Katarína Ďurovičová

=== Others ===
Grand Prix	★ Pavol Hammel
