= 3rd ZAI Awards =

Slovak music industry awards for 1992

3rd ZAI Awards

- 1993
- Bratislava, Slovakia

Presenter
Union of Authors and Performers (ZAI)

Broadcaster
STV (delay)

Grand Prix
Marián Varga

◄ 2nd │ 4th ►

The 3rd ZAI Awards, honoring the best in the Slovak music industry for individual achievements for the year of 1992, took place and time in Bratislava in 1993.

== Winners ==
=== Main categories ===
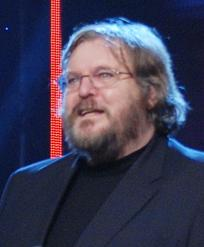
Boris Filan

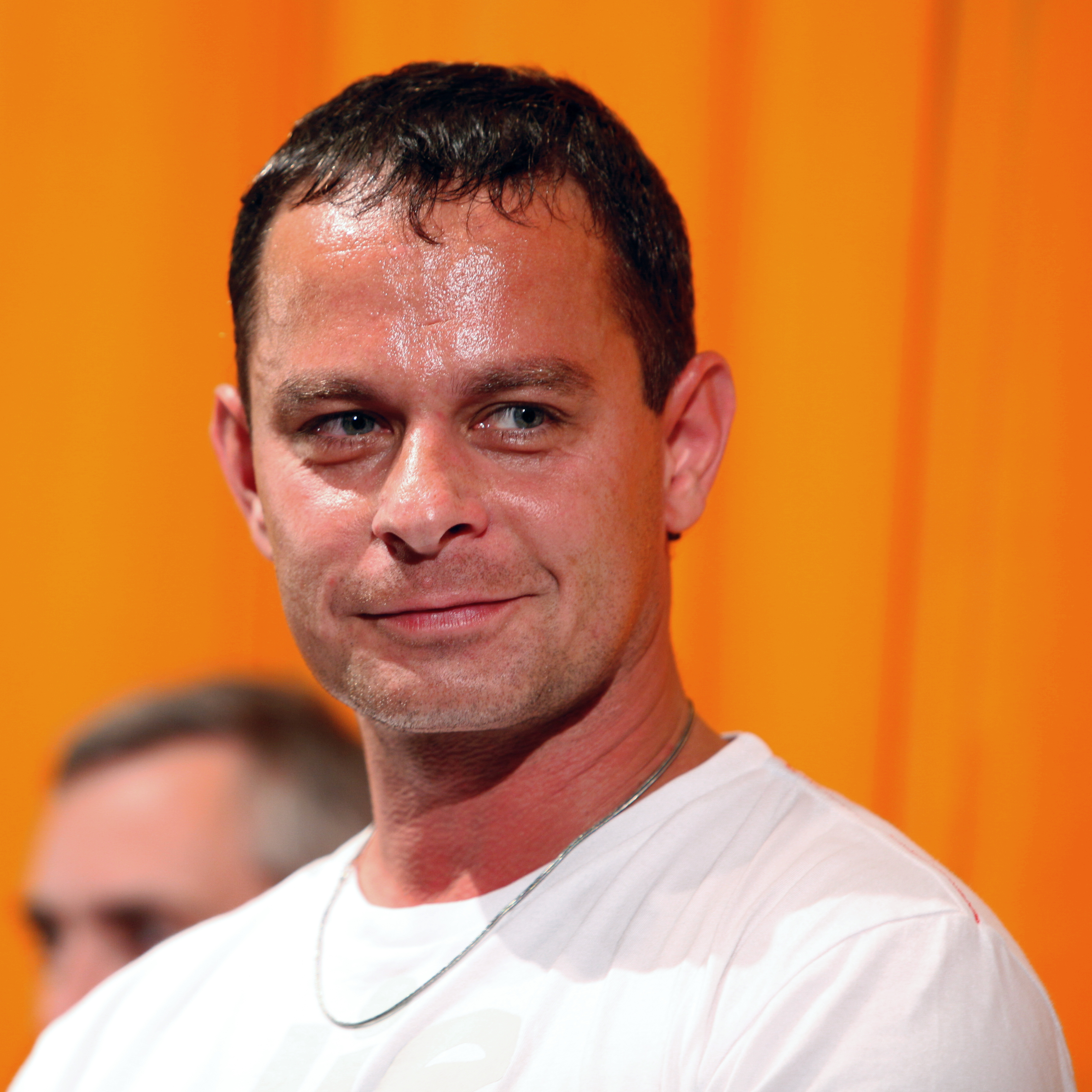
Filip Renč

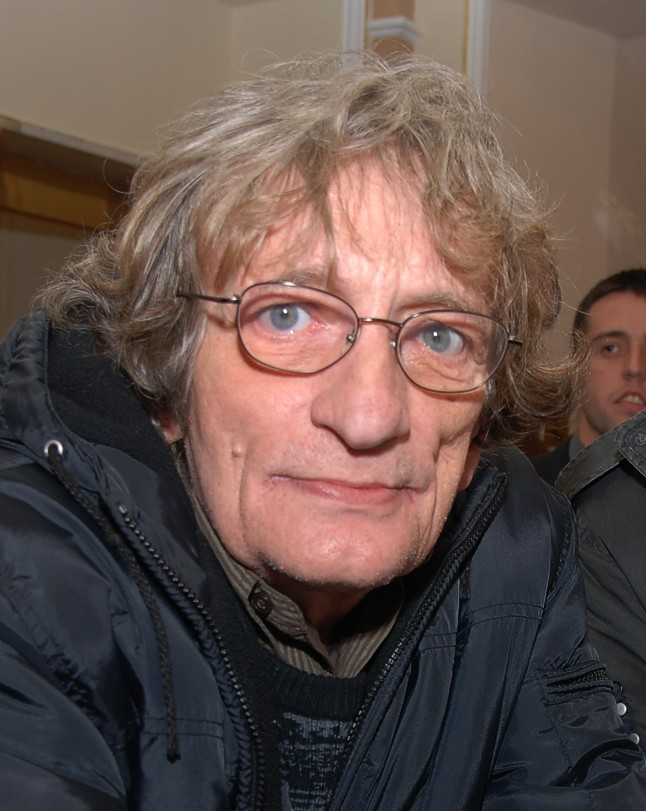
Marián Varga

Vocal Artist or Ensemble	New Artist
★ Pavol Habera	★ Money Factor
Instrumental Artist	Writer
★ Andrej Šeban	★ Boris Filan – "Hostia z inej planéty" (by Elán)
Album	Song
★ Volanie divočiny – Tublatanka	★ "Vráť trochu lásky medzi nás" (by Money Factor) – Jozef Urban (lyrics) • Money Factor (music)
Record	Producer
★ Neuč vtáka lietať (by R. Müller) – Jozef Krajčovič	★ Pavel Daněk – (Unknown)
Music Video
★ "Ona je Madona" (by R. Grigorov) – Filip Renč

=== Others ===
Grand Prix	★ Marián Varga
