= 1st ZAI Awards =

Slovak music industry awards for 1990

1st ZAI Awards

- 1991
- Hotel Kiev, Bratislava, Slovakia

Presenter
Union of Authors and Performers (ZAI)

Broadcaster
STV (delay)

Grand Prix
Dežo Ursiny

2nd ►

The 1st ZAI Awards, honoring the best in the Slovak music industry for individual achievements for the year of 1990, took place at the Hotel Kiev in Bratislava in 1991.

== Winners ==
=== Main categories ===
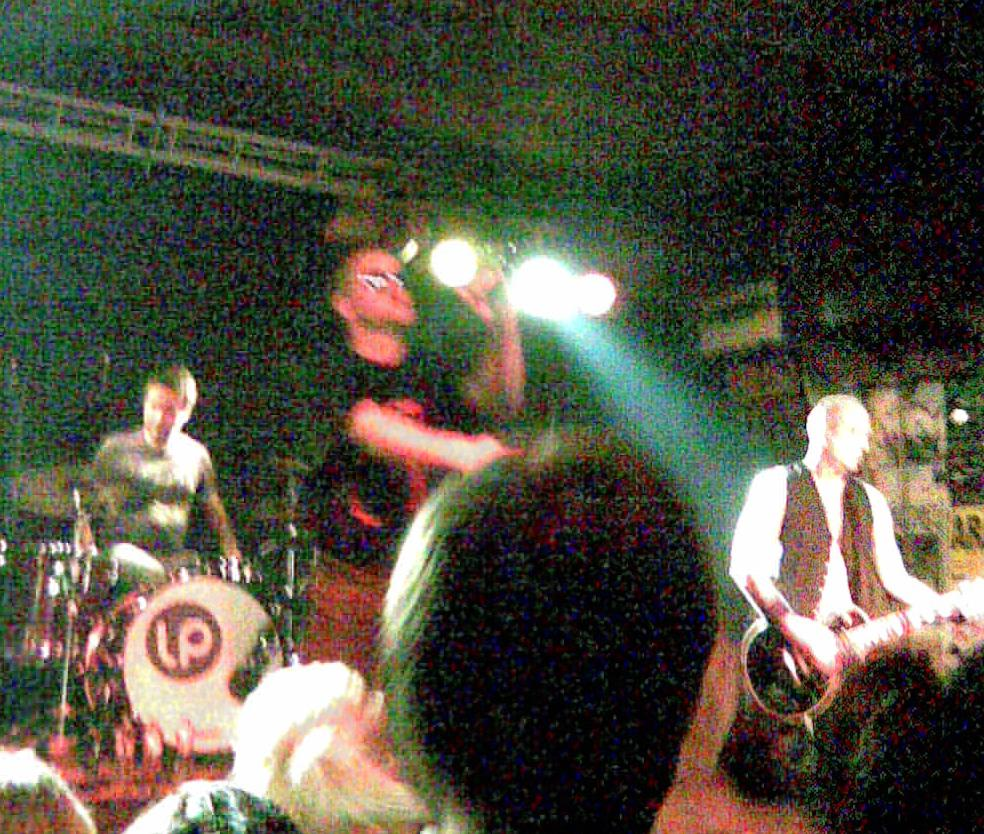
Slobodná Európa

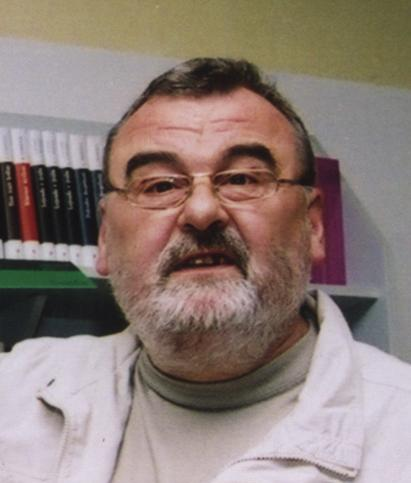
Ivan Štrpka

Vocal Artist or Ensemble	New Artist
★ Team	★ Slobodná Európa
Instrumental Artist	Writer
★ Juraj Burian	★ Ivan Štrpka
Record	Song
★ Pyramida snů (by Oceán) – Juraj Burian	★ "Pravda víťazí" (by Tublatanka) – Martin Sarvaš (lyrics) • Martin Ďurinda (music)
Music Video
★ "Unknown" – Peter Sedlák

=== Others ===
Grand Prix	★ Dežo Ursiny
