= 4th ZAI Awards =

Slovak music industry awards for 1993

4th ZAI Awards

- February 1994
- Bratislava, Slovakia

Presenter
Union of Authors and Performers (ZAI)

Broadcaster
STV (delay)

Grand Prix
Ján Lehotský

◄ 3rd │ 5th ►

The 4th ZAI Awards, honoring the best in the Slovak music industry for individual achievements for the year of 1993, took time and place in February 1994 in Bratislava.

== Winners ==
=== Main categories ===
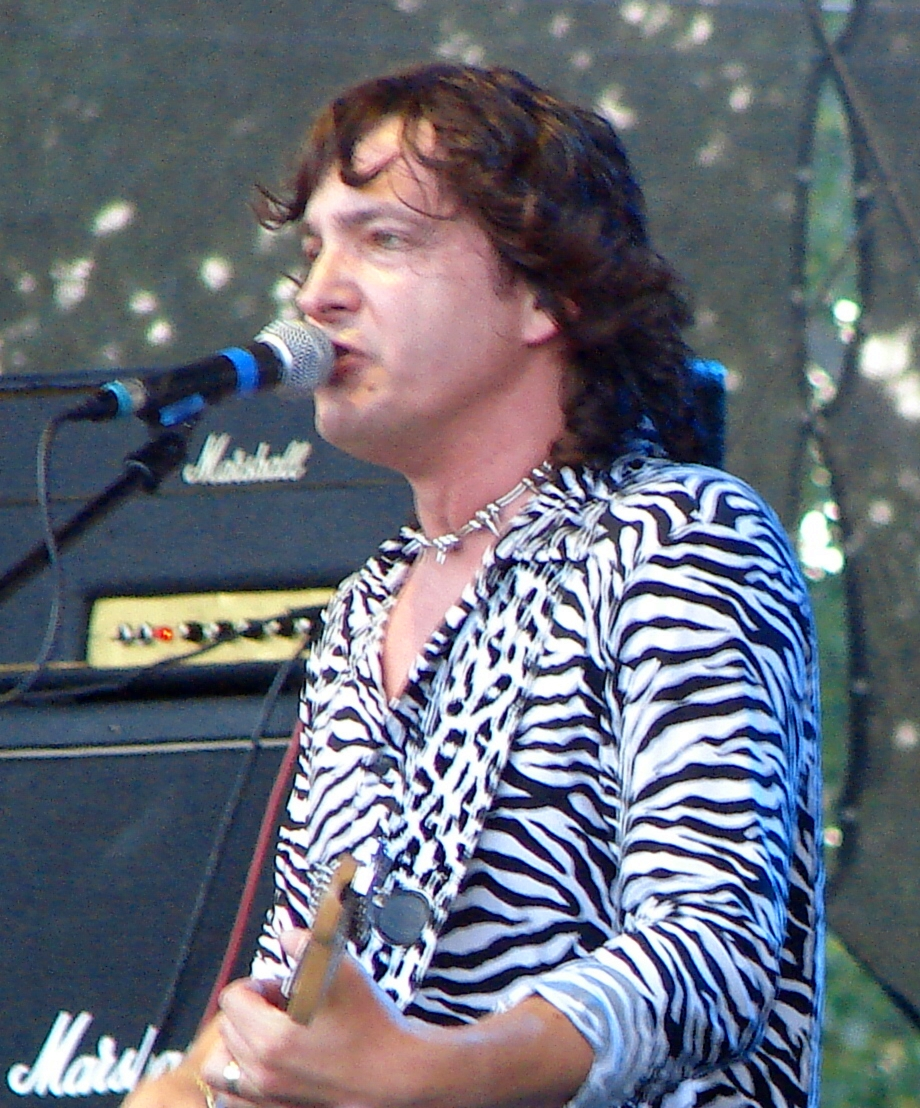
Martin Ďurinda of Tublatanka

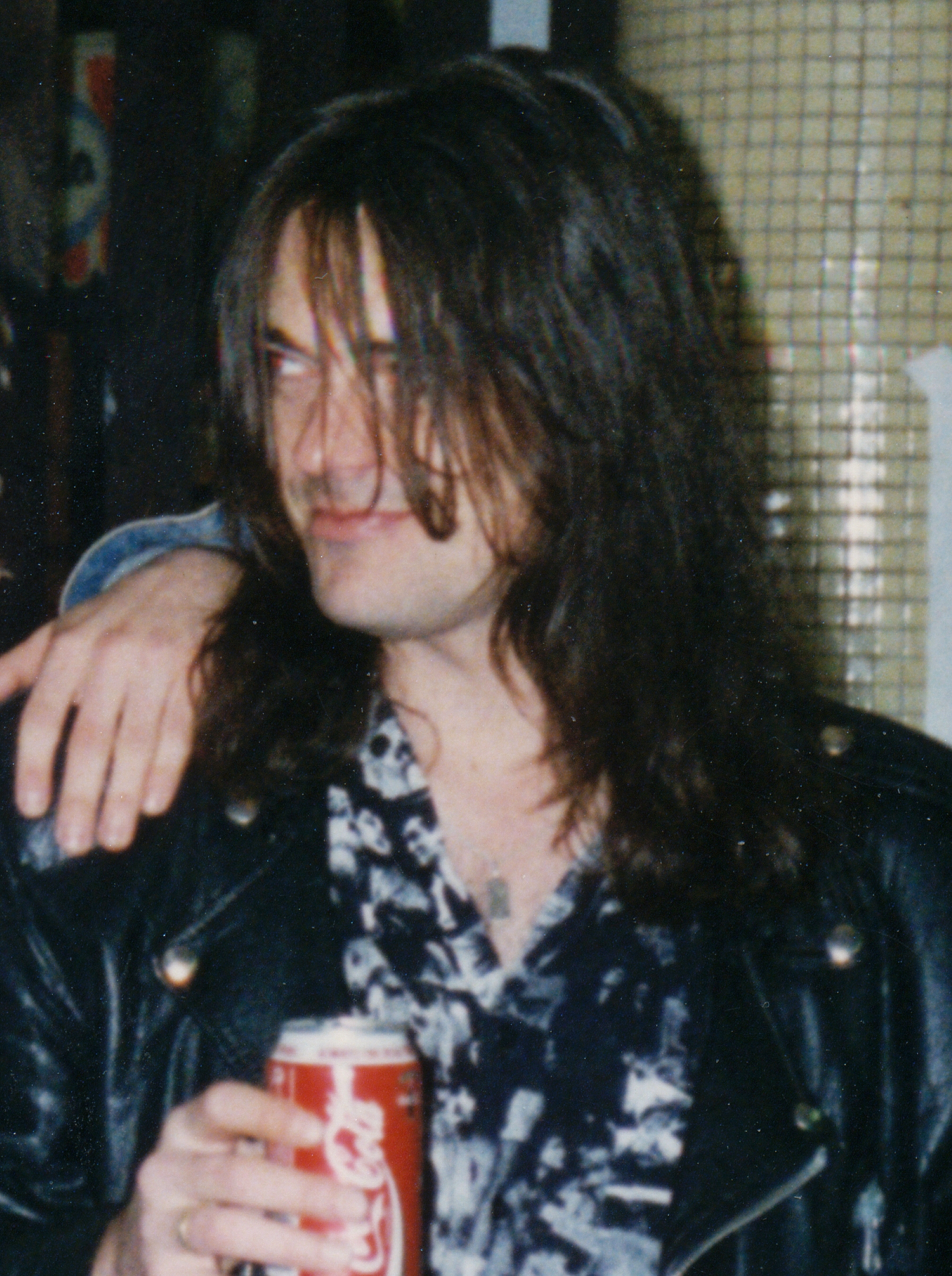
Peter Uherčík

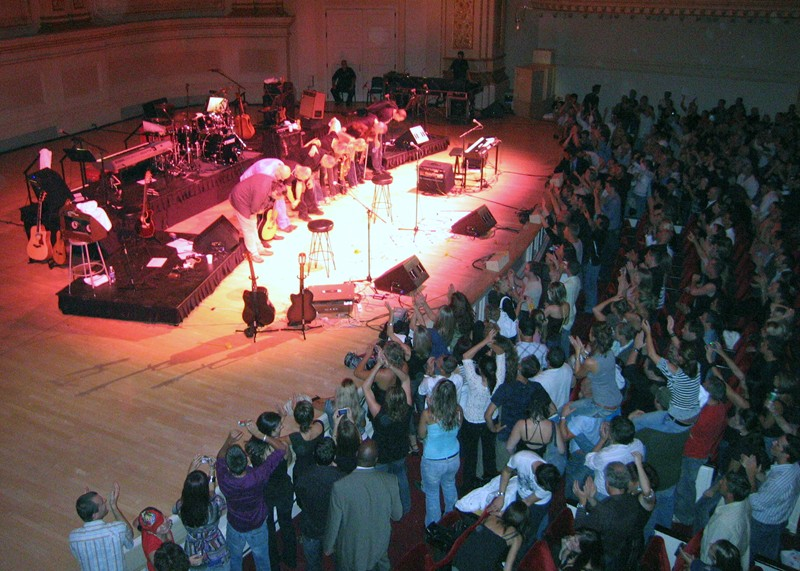
Elán

Vocal Artist or Ensemble	New Artist
★ Tublatanka	★ Broken Heart
Instrumental Artist	Writer
★ Peter Uherčík	★ Tibor Horniak – Odvrátená tvár (by Isabelle)
Album	Song
★ Poďme bratia do Betlehema – Tublatanka	★ "Amnestia na neveru" (by Elán) – Boris Filan (lyrics) • Ján Baláž and Jozef Ráž (music)
Record	Producer
★ Odvrátená tvár (by Isabelle) – Ivan Minárik	★ Pavel Daněk – Labutie piesne (by P. Hammel, R. Hladík, M. Varga)
Music Video
★ "Labutie piesne" (by P. Hammel, R. Hladík, M. Varga) – Katarína Ďurovičová

=== Others ===
Grand Prix	★ Ján Lehotský
