= 11th ZAI Awards =

Slovak music industry awards for 2000

11th ZAI Awards

Artmedia Music Academy Awards
- March 9, 2001
- DK Zrkadlový háj, Bratislava, Slovakia

Presenter(s)
- Union of Authors and Performers (ZAI)
- Music Fund Slovakia (HF)
- IFPI Slovakia (SNS IFPI)

Broadcaster
Markíza

Grand Prix
Peter Lipa

◄ 10th │ 12th ►

The 11th ZAI Awards, honoring the best in the Slovak music industry for individual achievements for the year of 2000, took time and place on March 9, 2001 at the civic center Zrkadlový háj in Bratislava. The ceremony was held in association with the local Music Fund (HF) and the International Federation of the Phonographic Industry Slovakia (SNS IFPPI). As with the previous two editions, the accolades were named after the Artmedia Music Academy, established by ZAI and the related company in 1999.

== Winners ==
=== Main categories ===
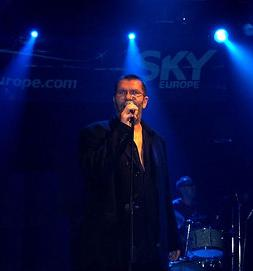
Richard Müller

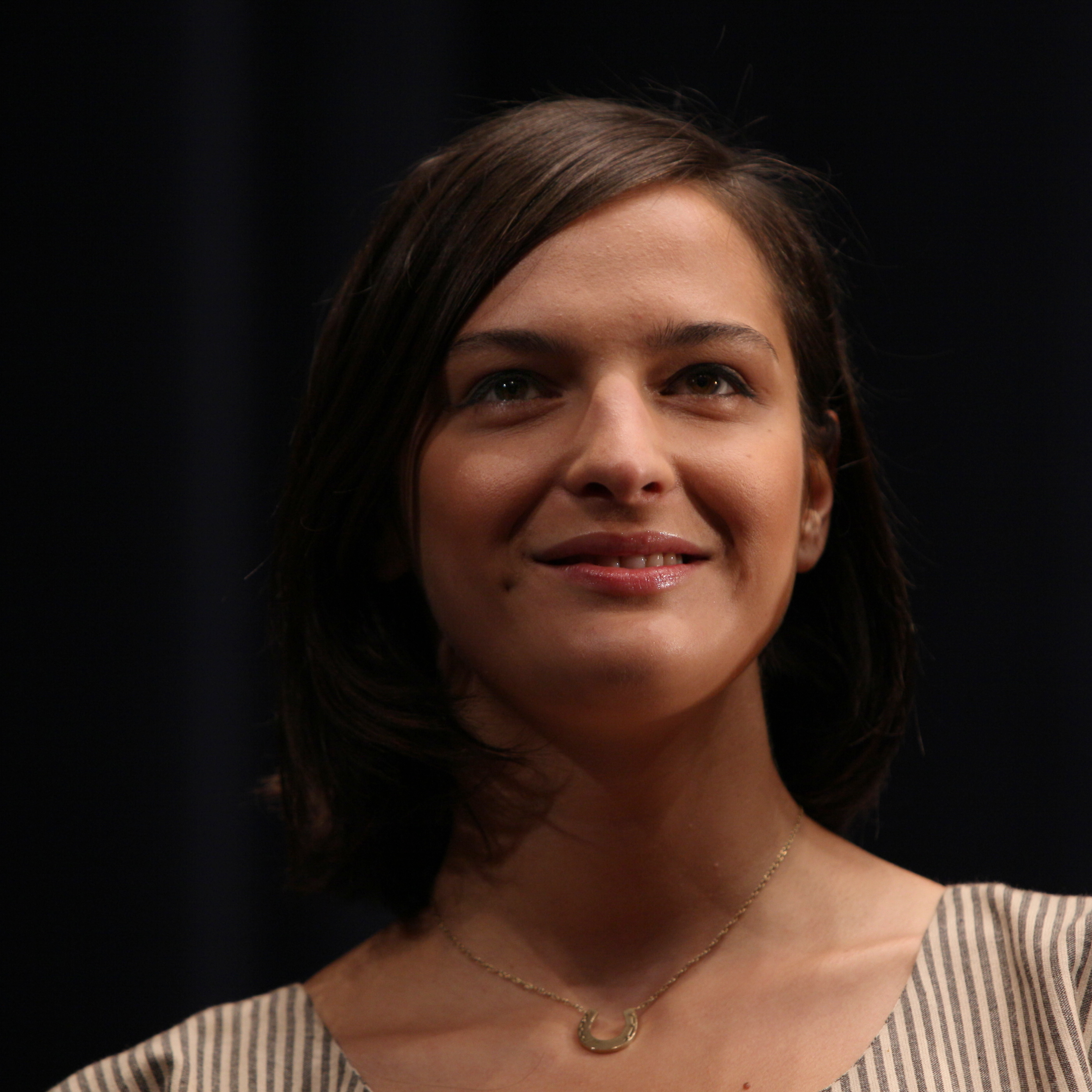
Jana Kirschner

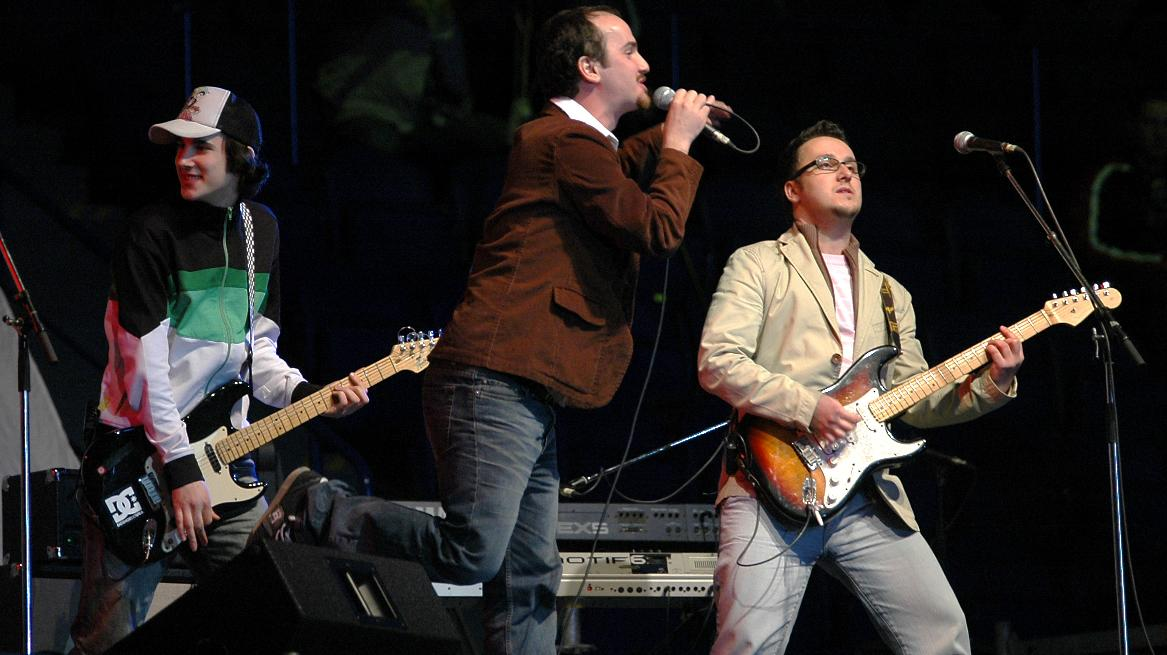
No Name

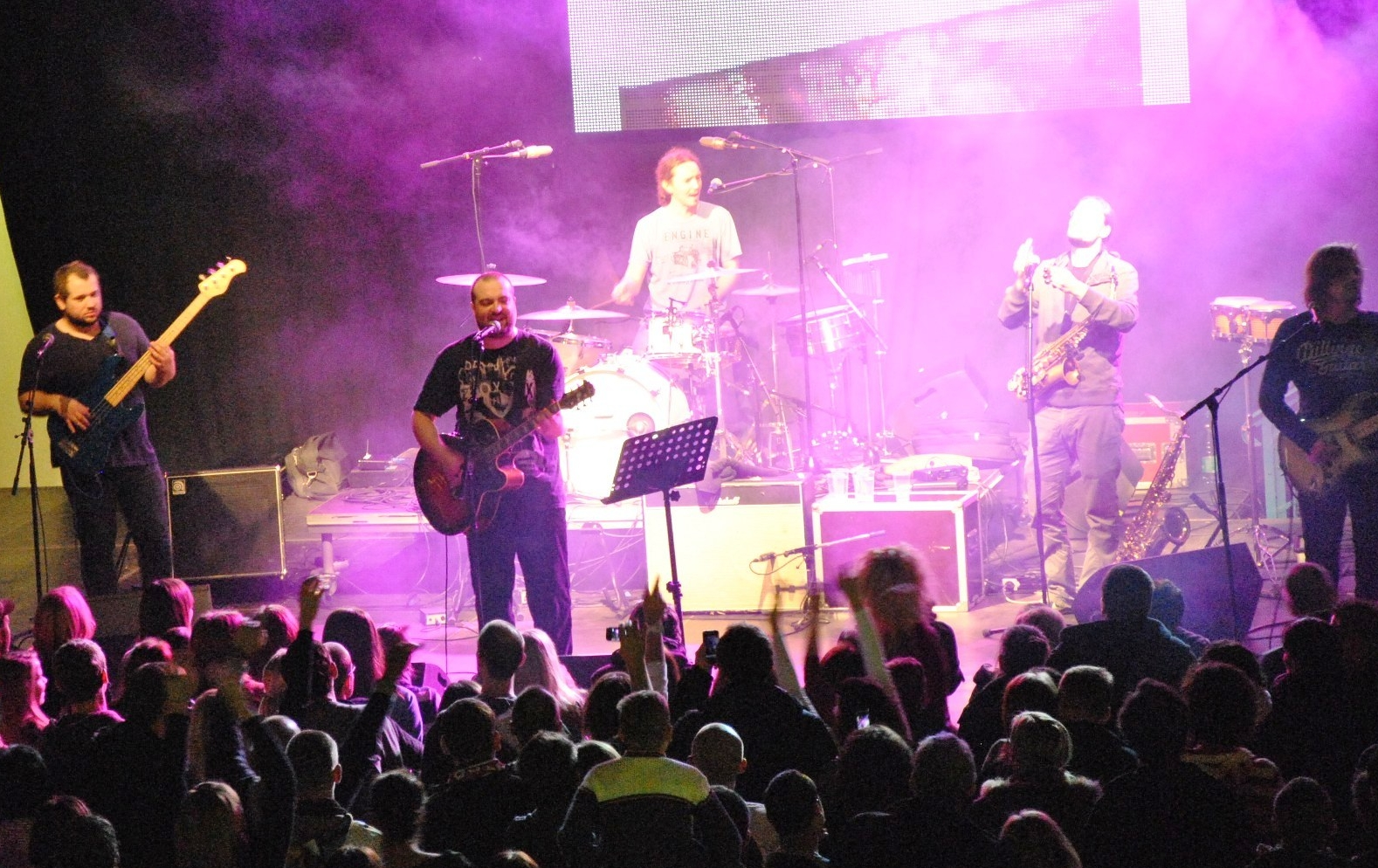
IMT Smile

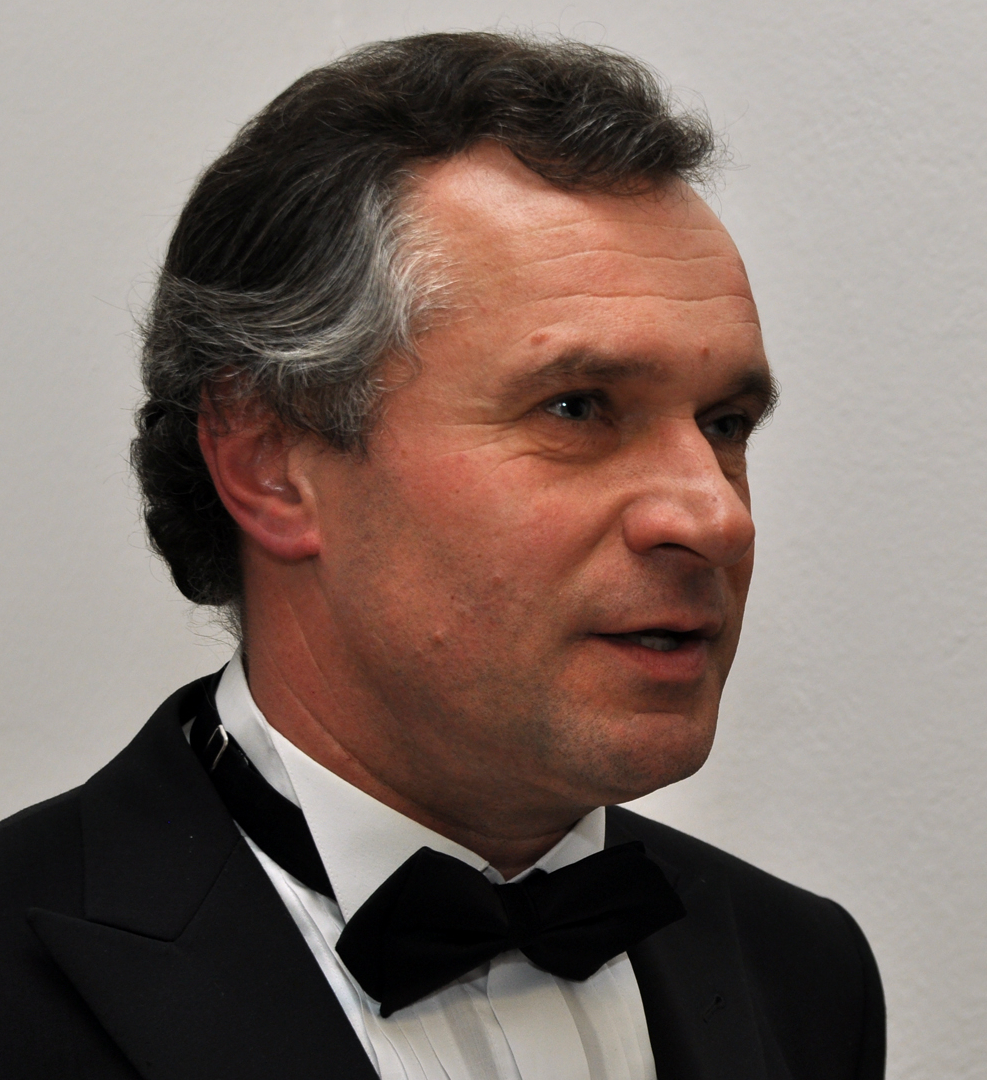
Martin Babjak

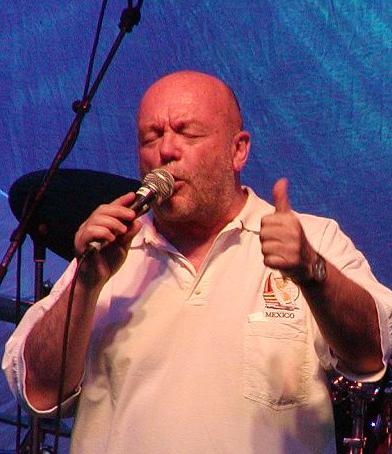
Peter Lipa

Vocal Male Artist – Pop	Vocal Female Artist – Pop
★ Richard Müller	★ Jana Kirschner
Vocal Ensemble – Pop	New Artist
★ No Name	★ Róbert Papp
Instrumental Artist	Writer(s)
★ Andrej Šeban	★ Igor Timko • Roman Timko – "Žily" (by No Name)
Cover Art	Song
★ Richard Müller a hosté (by R. Müller) – Michal Hořava and Jan Saudek	★ "Žily" (by No Name) – Igor and Roman Timko
Record	Album – Pop
★ Bezvetrie (by A. Šeban) – Juraj Kupec, Ivan Jombík and Miroslav Širáň	★ Počkám si na zázrak – No Name
Producer	Music Act
★ Bezvetrie (by A. Šeban) – Juraj Kupec	★ TV Luna – Music television
Music Video
★ "Tajné milovanie" (by IMT Smile) – Vladimír Struhár

=== Genre awards ===
Vocal Male Artist – Classical	Vocal Male Artist – Traditional
★ Martin Babjak	★ Ján Berky-Mrenica, Jr
Vocal Female Artist – Classical	Vocal Female Artist – Traditional
★ Ľubica Vargicová	★ Darina Laščiaková
Vocal Ensemble – Classical	Vocal Ensemble – Traditional
★ Slovenský komorný orchester	★ Diabolské husle of Berky-Mrenica, Sr
Album – Traditional
★ Diabolské husle (by Berky-Mrenica, Sr) – Ján Berky-Mrenica, Sr

=== Others ===
Grand Prix	★ Peter Lipa
