= 9th ZAI Awards =

Slovak music industry awards for 1998

9th ZAI Awards

Artmedia Music Academy Awards
- February 26, 1999
- New Scene, Bratislava, Slovakia

Presenter(s)
- Union of Authors and Performers (ZAI)
- Music Fund Slovakia (HF)
- IFPI Slovakia (SNS IFPI)

Broadcaster
STV

Grand Prix
Kamil Peteraj

◄ 8th │ 10th ►

The 9th ZAI Awards, honoring the best in the Slovak music industry for individual achievements for the year of 1998, took time and place on February 26, 1999, at the New Scene Theater in Bratislava. The ceremony was held in association with the local Music Fund (HF) and, for the first time, with the International Federation of the Phonographic Industry Slovakia (SNS IFPPI). For that reason, the accolades were renamed after the Artmedia Music Academy, established by ZAI and the related company. The winners received a plaque with a five-pointed golden star. Host of the event was Peter Kočiš.

== Winners ==
=== Main categories ===
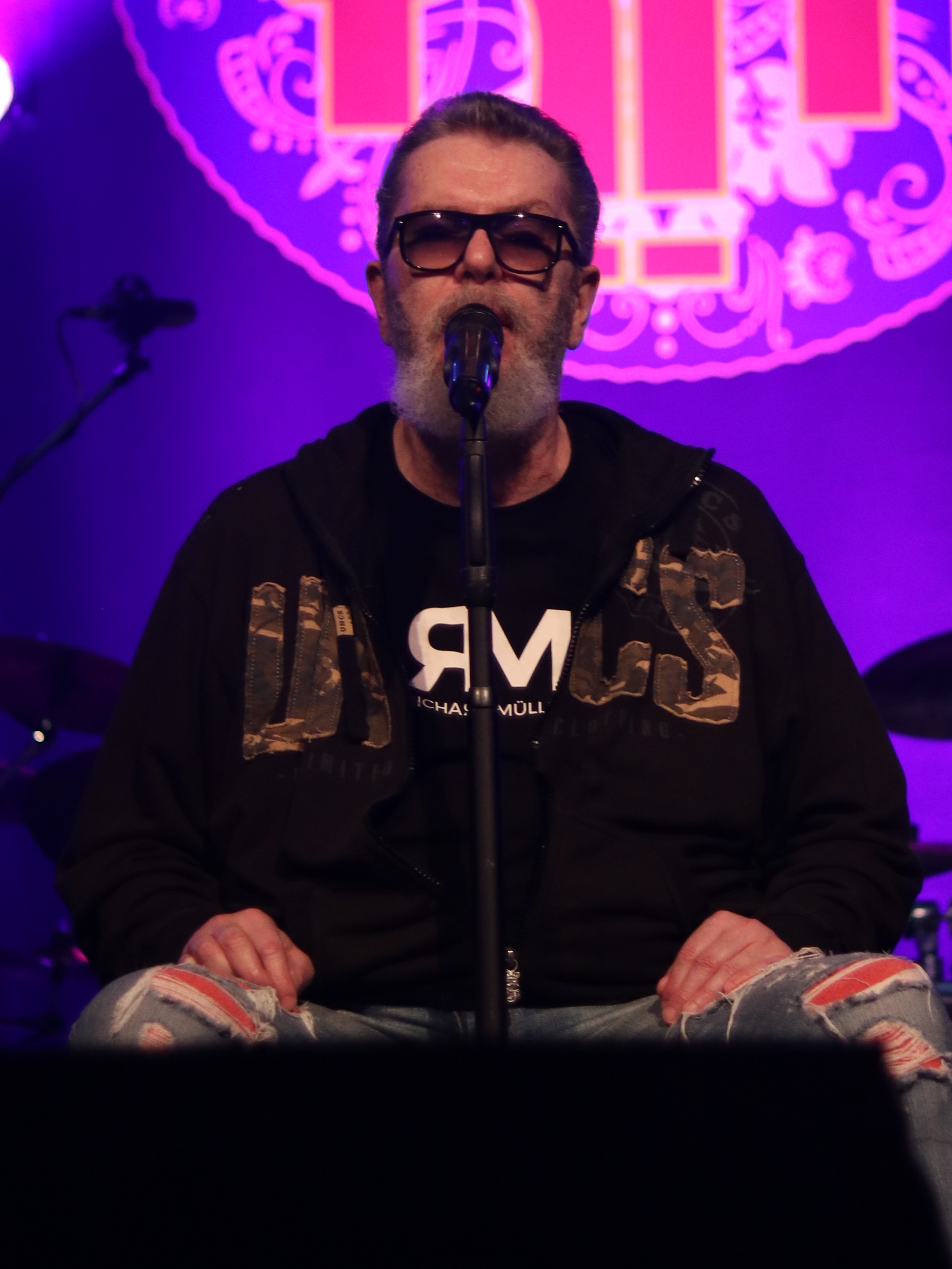
Richard Müller

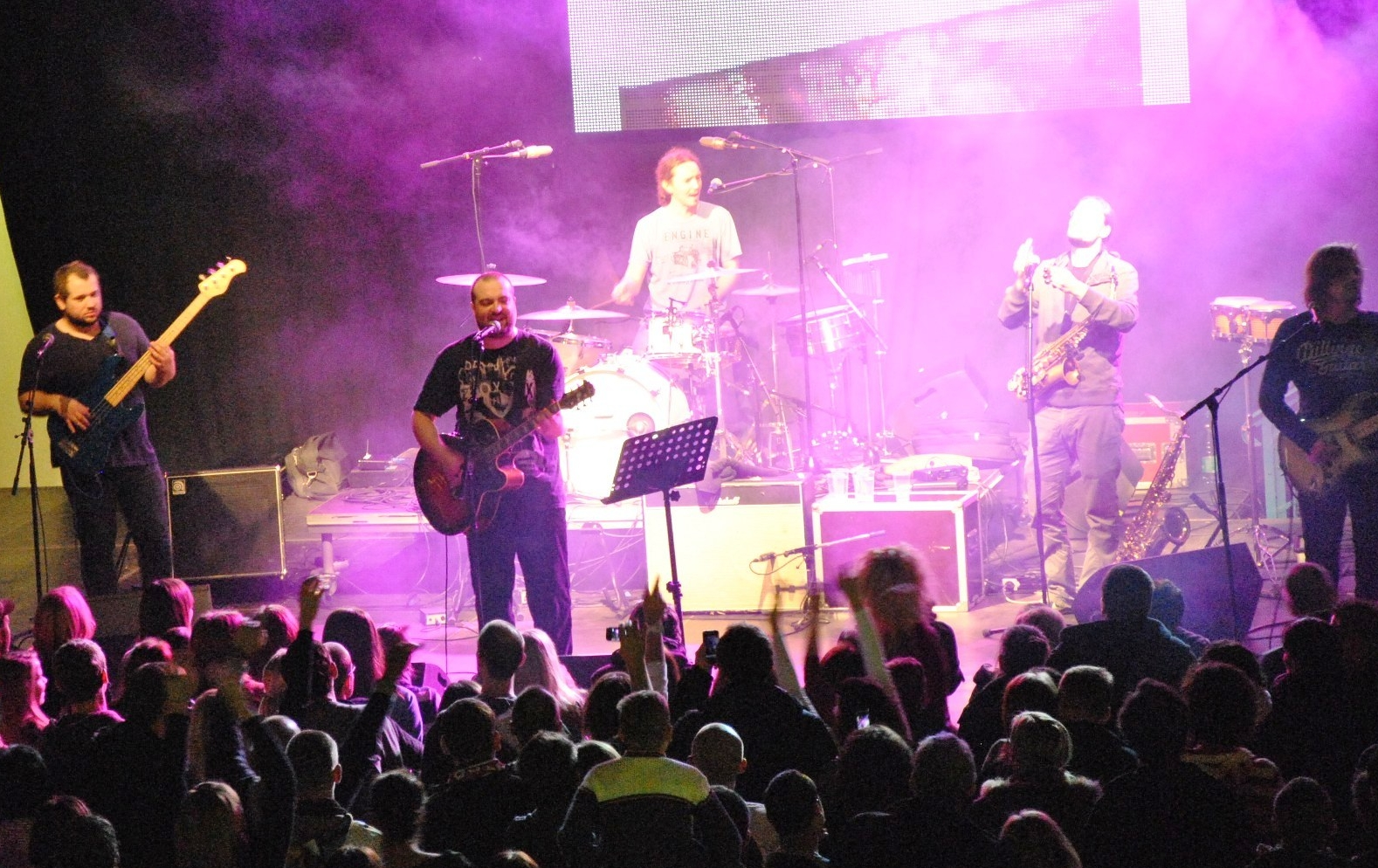
IMT Smile

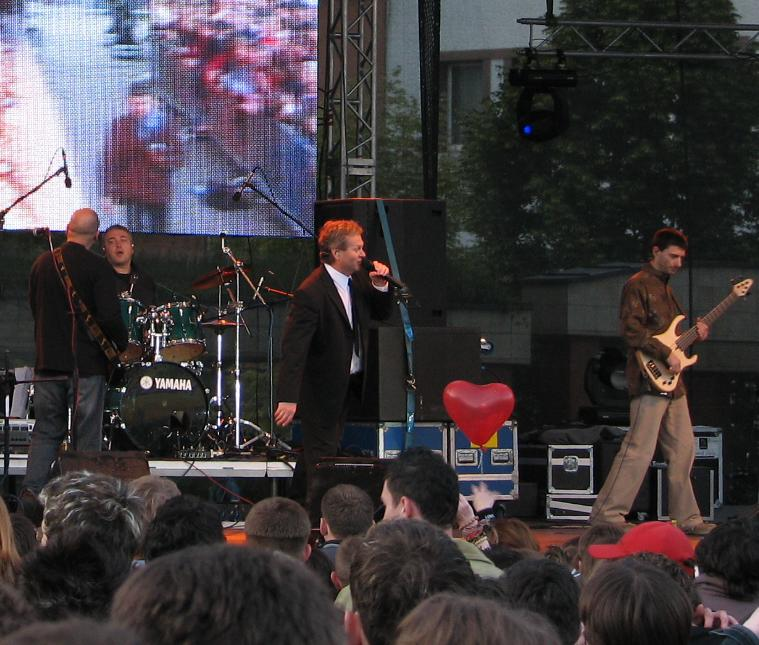
Vidiek

Vocal Artist	Vocal Ensemble
★ Richard Müller	★ IMT Smile
Instrumental Artist	New Artist
★ Andrej Šeban	★ Free Faces
Cover Art	Song
★ Jozef Červeň – Almost True Story (by Free Faces)	★ "Nočná optika" (by R. Müller) – Richard Müller (lyrics/music)
Record	Album
★ Almost True Story (by Free Faces) – Ivan Jombík	★ Nočná optika – Richard Müller
Producer	Music Video
★ Richard Müller – Nočná optika (by Himself): Tomáš Dohňanský with Ivan Minárik – Chupacabras (by O.B.D.)	★ "Môžeš závidieť" (by Vidiek) – Karol Vosátko

Other nominees included also Street Dancers, Peter Lipa, Adriena Bartošová and No Name.

=== Others ===
Special Mention	★ Pavol Zelenay • Peter Pišťanek
Grand Prix	★ Kamil Peteraj
