= 8th ZAI Awards =

Slovak music industry awards for 1997

8th ZAI Awards

Grammy Slovakia '97
- March 2, 1998
- New Scene, Bratislava, Slovakia

Presenter(s)
- Union of Authors and Performers (ZAI)
- Music Fund Slovakia (HF)

Broadcaster
STV2 (delay, on March 8, 1998)

Grand Prix
Miroslav Žbirka

◄ 7th │ 9th ►

The 8th ZAI Awards, honoring the best in the Slovak music industry for individual achievements for the year of 1997, took time and place on March 2, 1998, at the New Scene Theater in Bratislava. The ceremony was held in association with the local Music Fund (HF) and was hosted by actress Zdena Studenková. Unlike the previous editions when a clay statuette was designed, the new winners were bestowed a golden, five-pointed star with an inscription that read Grammy Slovakia '97, stationed on a black base.

== Winners ==
=== Main categories ===
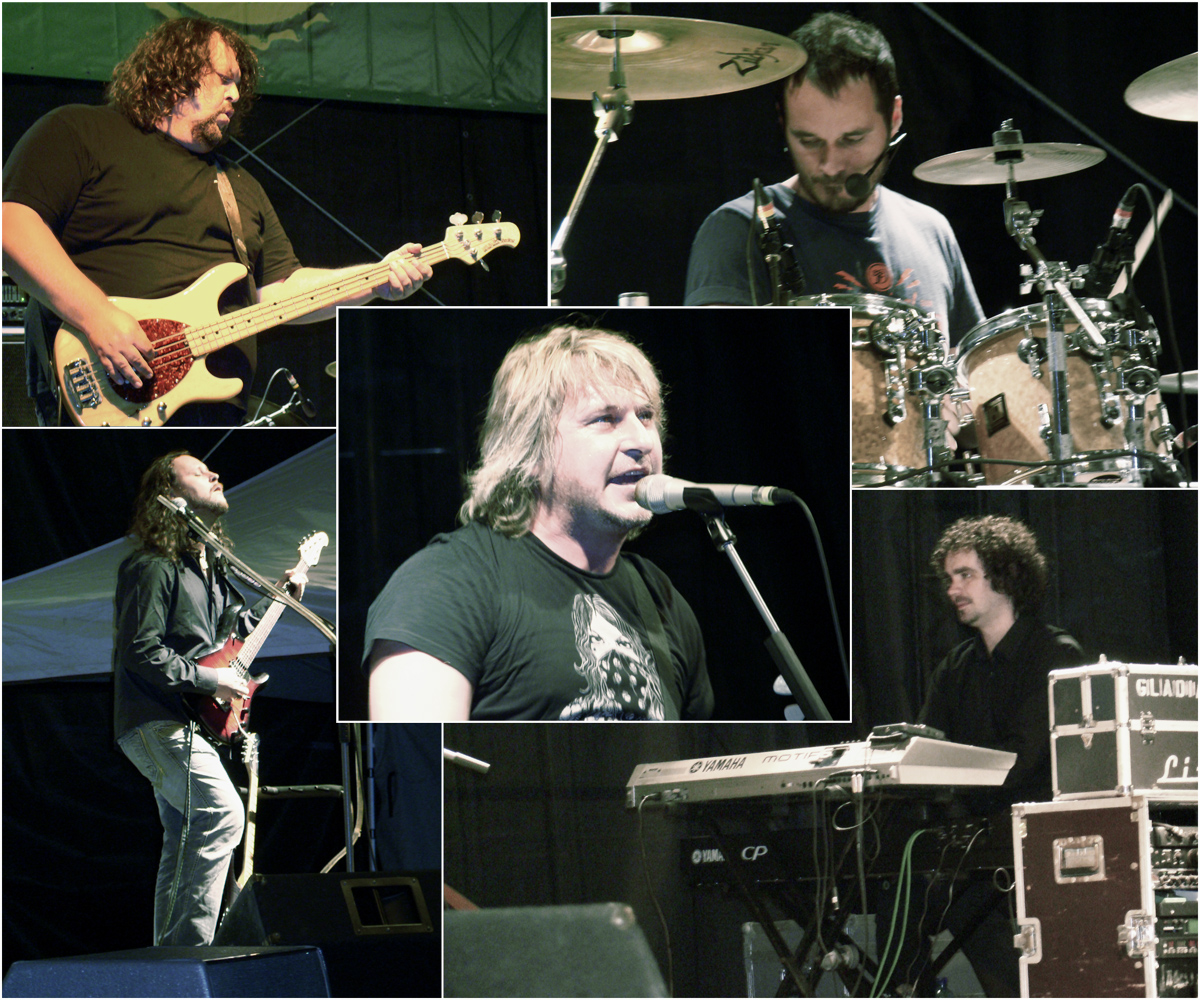
Gladiator

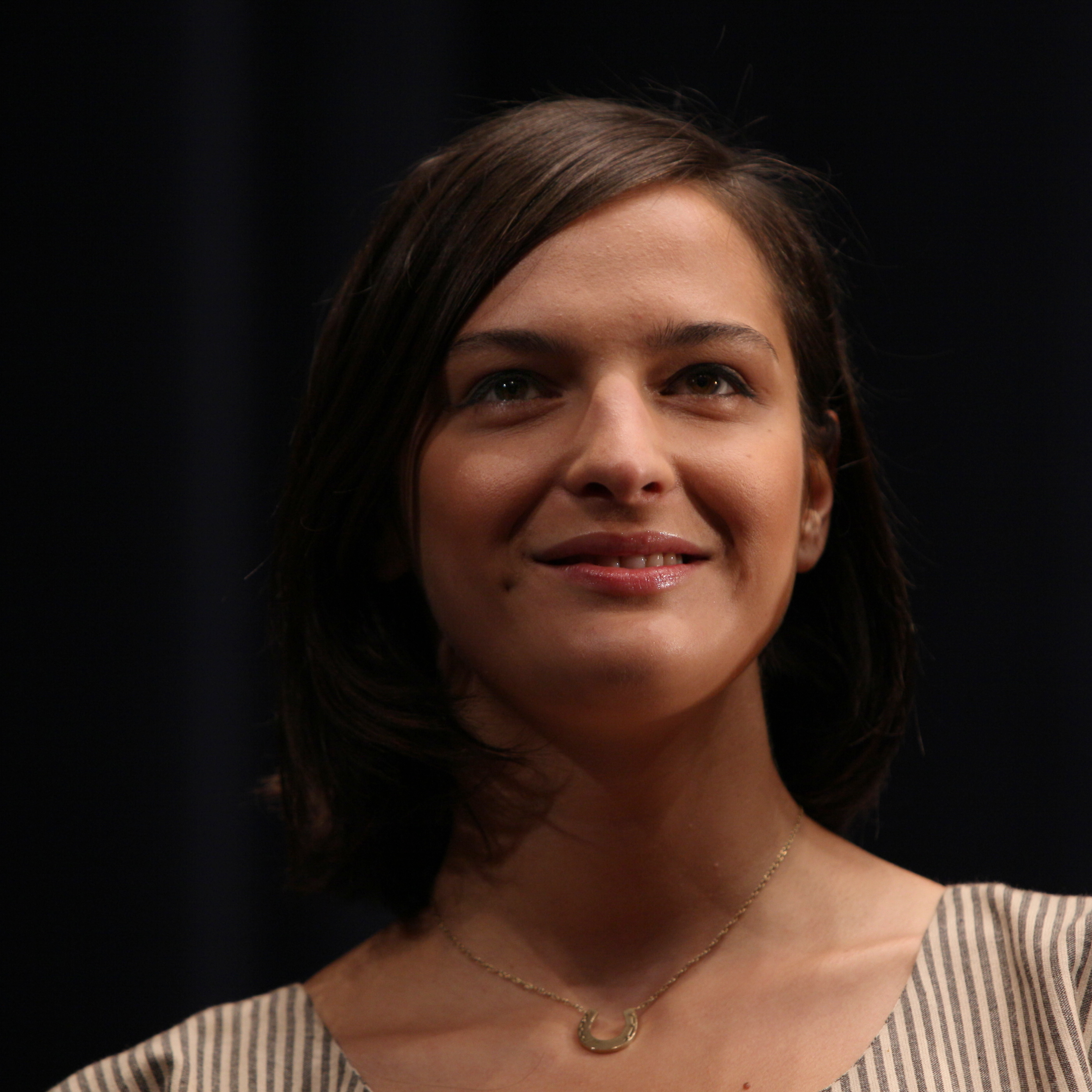
Jana Kirschner

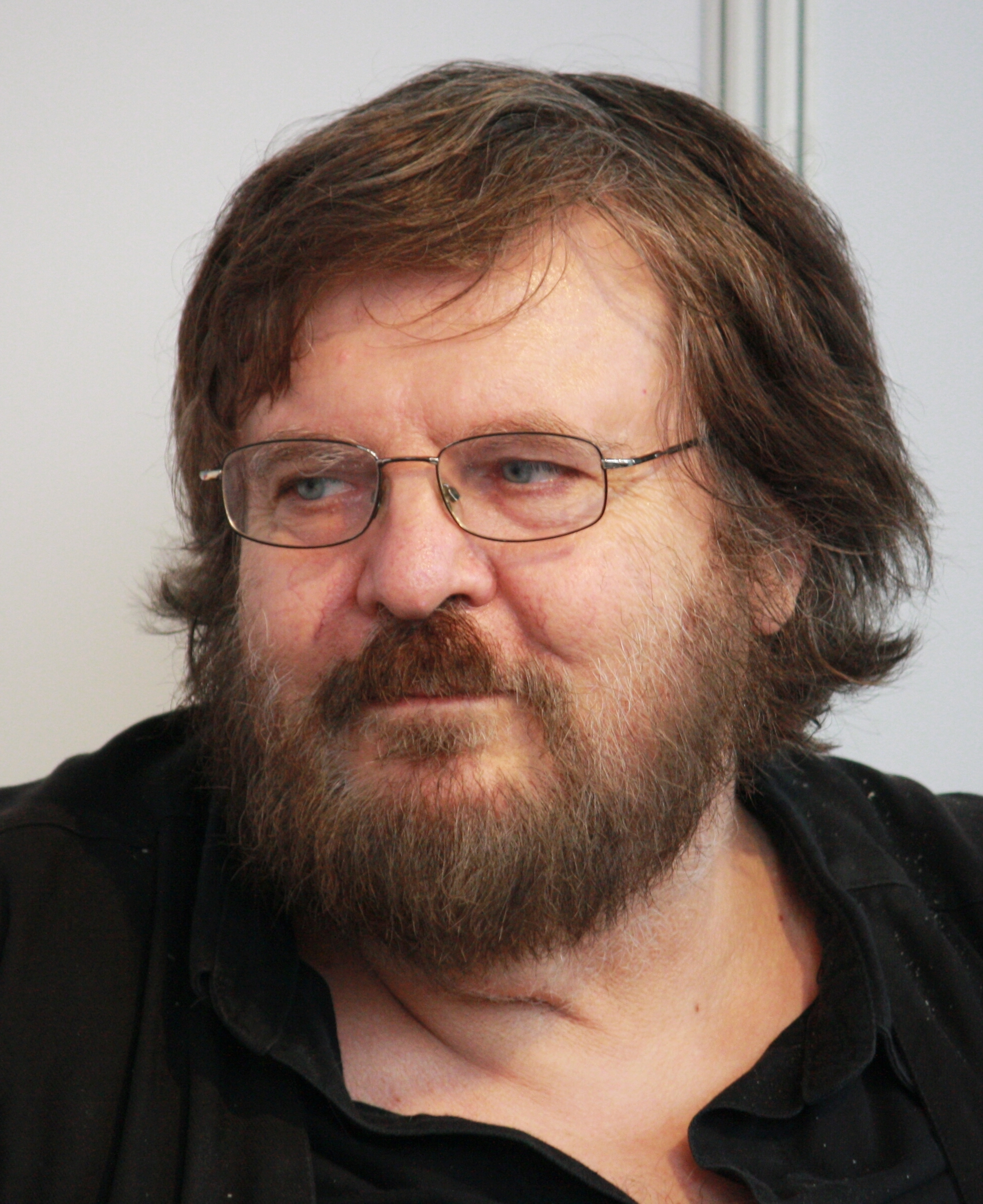
Boris Filan

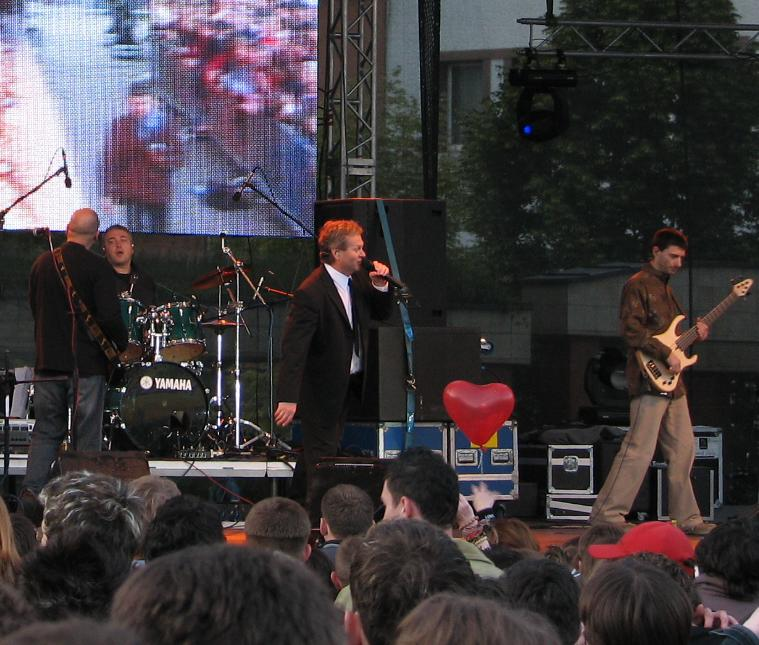
Vidiek

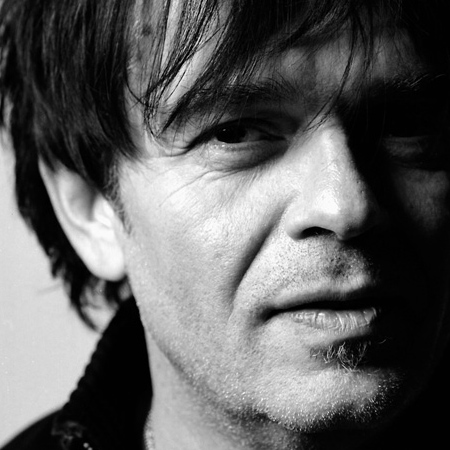
Ladislav Lučenič

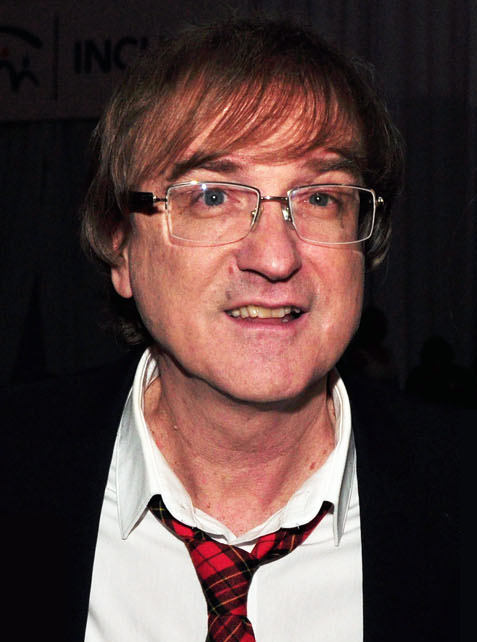
Miroslav Žbirka

Vocal Artist or Ensemble	New Artist
★ Gladiator: Hex; IMT Smile; Made II Mate; Vidiek	★ Jana Kirschner: B3; Karol Mikloš; Róbert Opatovský; Polemic
Instrumental Artist	Dancefloor Artist
★ Marcel Buntaj: Gabriel Dušík; Ladislav Lučenič; Andrej Šeban; Henrich Tóth	★ D-Night: Exil; Fun Master; Lobby; Maduar
Writer	Song
★ Boris Filan – "Buď tma" (by P. Hammel): Miloš Hladký – "Slovenská" (by Gladiator); Richard Jajcay – "Vianoce '97" (by Vidiek); Peter Uličný – "Týždeň má sto dní " (by P. Habera); Martin Žúži – "Som on (Snežný pluh)" (by Hex)	★ "Slovenská" (by Gladiator) – Miloš Hladký (lyrics/music): "Fönky nálada" (by Made II Mate) – Katarína Korčeková (lyrics) • Made II Mate (music); "Som on (Snežný pluh)" (by Hex) – Martin Žúži (lyrics) • Peter Dudák (music); "Vianoce '97" (by Vidiek) – Richard Jajcay (lyrics/music); "Vrany" (by IMT Smile) – Vladimír Krausz (lyrics) • Ivan Tásler (music)
Record	Album
★ Ultrapop (by Hex) • Štyry (by Vidiek) – Ivan Minárik: B3 (B3)– B.P.M. Music Production; Carousel Life (by Made II Mate) – Ivan Jombík • Petr Ackermann • Igor Baar; Legal Drug (by Gladiator) – Tomáš Kmeť • Roman Slávik; Život je... (by P. Hammel) – Juraj Solan	★ Ultrapop – Hex: Carousel Life – Made II Mate; Kilk-klak – IMT Smile; Sen lásky – Darina Rolincová; Štyry – Vidiek
Producer	Music Video
★ Ladislav Lučenič – Good Vibes: Remixes • Klik-klak (by IMT Smile) • "Tomorrow" and The Same Mist Here (by K. Mikloš): Pavel Daněk – Život je... (by P. Hammel); Gabriel Dušík – Argo • Hra na telo (by M. Noga) • No Problem (by M. Noga, Š. Skrúcaný); Peter Nagy – Extra 2 • Peter Nagy a deti: Výber; Andrej Šeban – Jana Kirschner (by Herself)	★ "Slovenská" (by Gladiator) – Karol Vosátko: "Buď tma" (by P. Hammel) – Katarína Ďurovičová; "Happy End" (by M. Noga) – Roman Petrenko; "Pressburg Boys" (by M. Noga, Š, Skrúcaný) – Juraj Takáč; "Týždeň má sto dní" (by P. Habera) – František Antonín Brabec

=== Others ===
Grand Prix	★ Miroslav Žbirka
