= 10th ZAI Awards =

Slovak music industry awards for 1999

10th ZAI Awards

Artmedia Music Academy Awards
- February 25, 2000
- PKO, Bratislava, Slovakia

Presenter(s)
- Union of Authors and Performers (ZAI)
- Music Fund Slovakia (HF)
- IFPI Slovakia (SNS IFPI)

Broadcaster
STV

Grand Prix
Václav Patejdl

◄ 9th │ 11th ►

The 10th ZAI Awards, honoring the best in the Slovak music industry for individual achievements for the year of 1999, took time and place on February 25, 2000 at the Park kultúry a oddychu in Bratislava. The ceremony was held in association with the local Music Fund (HF) and the International Federation of the Phonographic Industry Slovakia (SNS IFPPI). As with the previous edition, the accolades were named after the Artmedia Music Academy, established by ZAI and the related company in 1999.

== Winners ==
=== Main categories ===
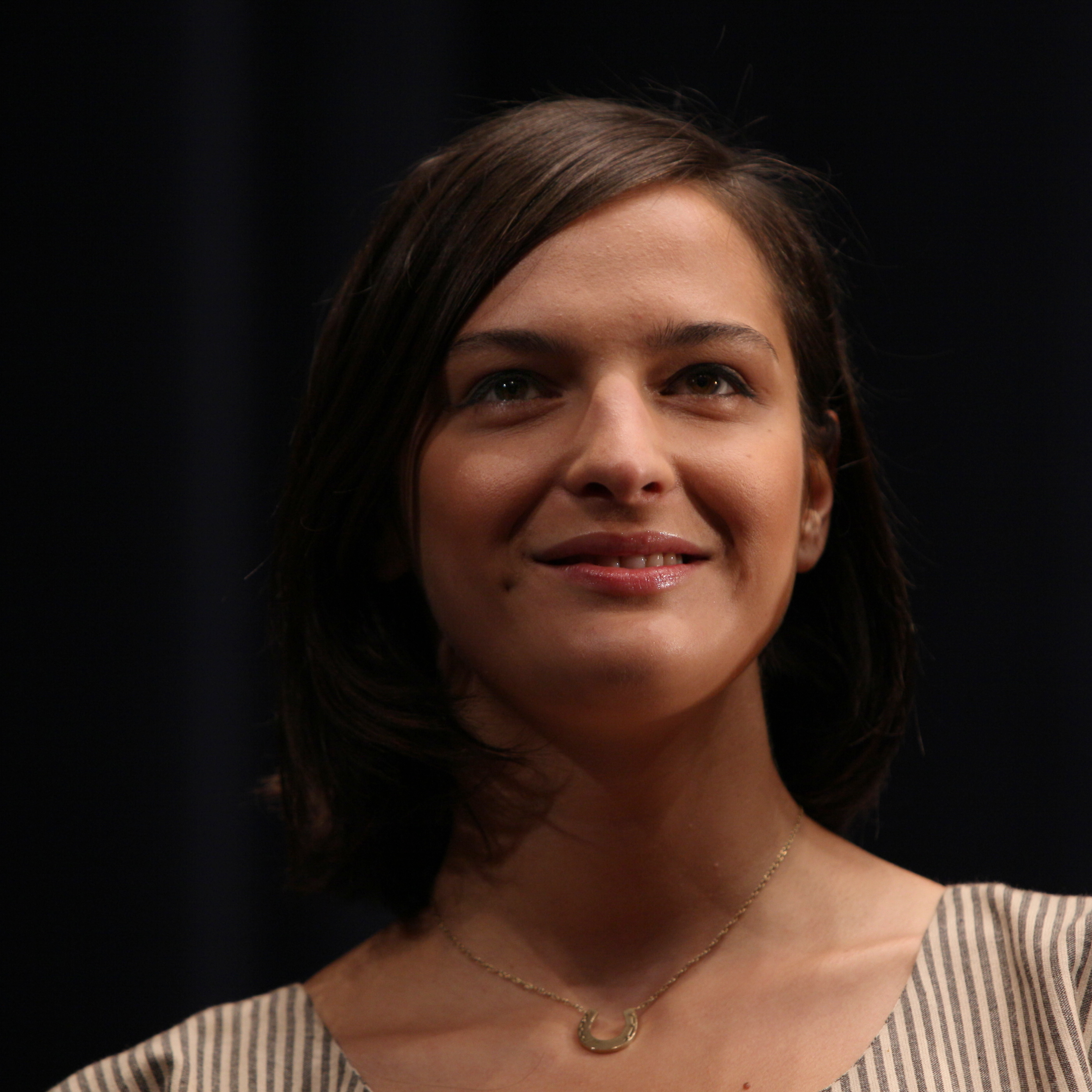
Jana Kirschner

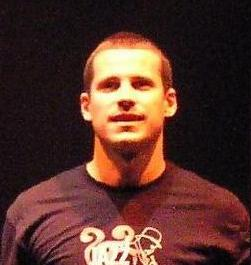
Martin Valihora

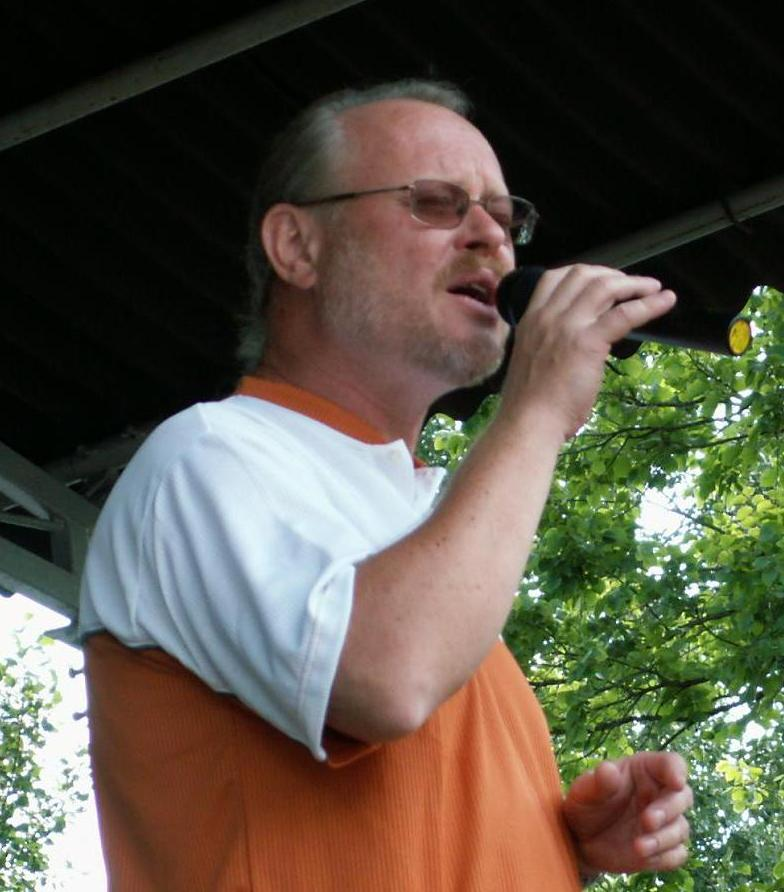
Václav Patejdl

Vocal Artist	Vocal Ensemble
★ Jana Kirschner	★ IMT Smile
Instrumental Artist	New Artist
★ Martin Valihora	★ Peha
Writer	Song
★ Jozef Urban – "Voda, čo ma drží nad vodou" (by J. Ráž)	★ "Voda, čo ma drží nad vodou" (by J. Ráž) – J. Urban (lyrics) • Václav Patejdl (music)
Cover Art	Record
★ 1999 (by P. Hammel, Prúdy) – Slavomír Gibej	★ Koniec sveta (by R. Müller) – Ivan Jombík
Album	Producer
★ V cudzom meste – Jana Kirschner	★ V cudzom meste – Jozef Šebo • Martin Gašpar
Music Video
★ "Maturantky" (by P. Lipa) – Adnan Hamzič

Other nominees included also Street Dancers, Peter Lipa, Adriena Bartošová and No Name.

=== Others ===
Special Mention	★ Marián Jaslovský
Grand Prix	★ Václav Patejdl
