= Sima Magušinová =

Slovak musician

Simona Magušinová
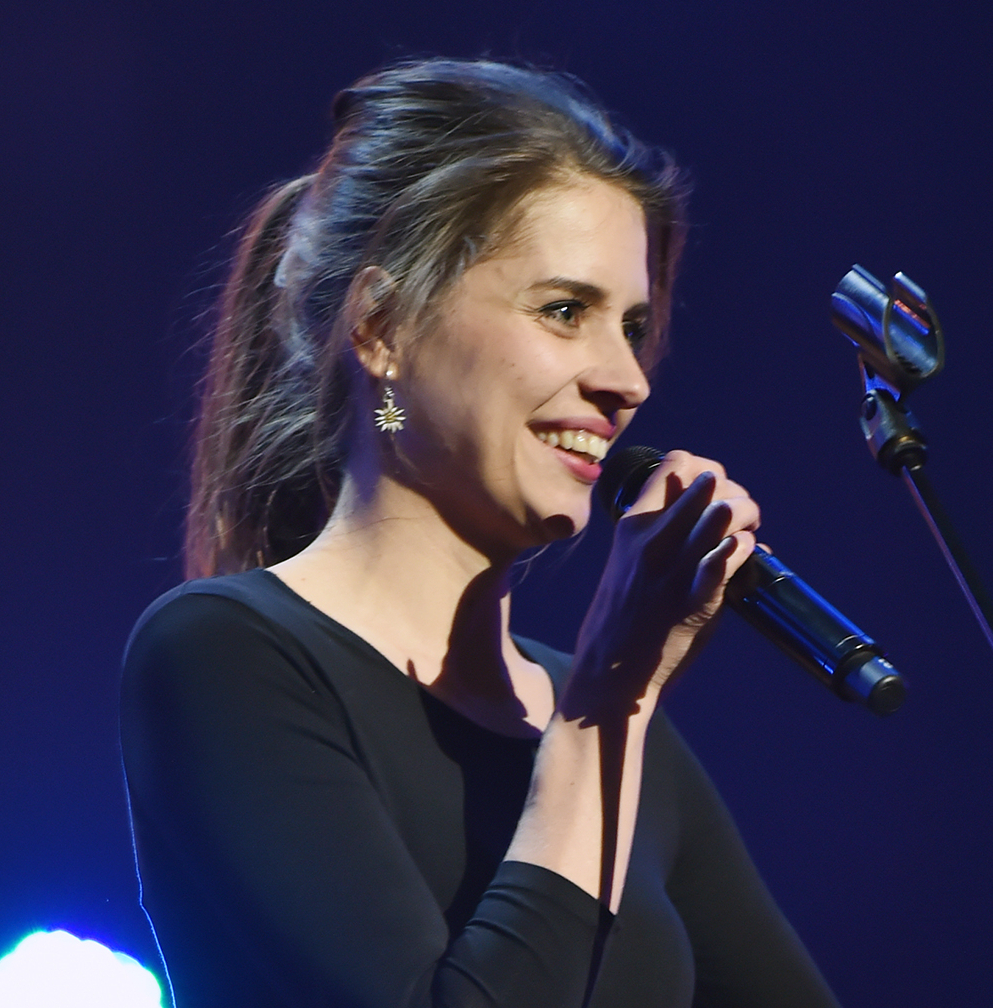
- Martausová in 2012

Background information
- Also known as: Sima Martausová, Sima Magušinová
- Born: Simona Martausová; 26 February 1988 (age 38); Považská Bystrica, Czechoslovakia
- Genres: Pop; Gospel; Folk
- Occupations: Singer; songwriter
- Instrument: Vocals
- Years active: 2012–present
- Labels: Studio Lux; Joma; Moja muzika
- Website: simamagusinova.sk

Simona Magušinová (née Martausová, born 26 February 1988) is a Slovak folk, pop and gospel singer and composer. Her 2013 album Dobrý deň, to som ja received a double platinum award.

== Biography ==
=== Early years ===
Simona Magušinová was born in Považská Bystrica to a social worker father and kindergarten teacher mother.

Magušinová originally wanted to study architecture but failed to pass the entrance exams. In 2012 she graduated in acting from the Art Academy in Banská Bystrica. While at collage, she started composing and playing music. In 2009 she won the musical competition Gospel Talent.

Following her graduation, Magušinová acted at the Radošínske naivné divadlo. In 2015 she quit acting to focus on her music career.

=== Music career ===
In 2012 Magušinová released her first album Vyzliecť si človeka, which featured her Gospel Talent winning song Nádherný svätý. From 2013 to 2016 she cooperated with the label Joma. Her breakthrough came with her 2013 album Dobrá deň, to som ja which received a double platinum award. In 2019 she started self-publishing her music. In 2020 she composed and performed the theme song of the movie The Auschwitz Report.

She lists Katie Melua, Norah Jones, Coldplay, Jaromír Nohavica, Tomáš Klus and Korben Dallas among her musical influences.

== Personal life ==
Magušinová is a devout Catholic. At 18 years old, she volunteered at the pilgrimage site of La Salette-Fallavaux and her faith is reflected in her music. She enjoys rock climbing and has climbed Mont Blanc. Between 2018 and 2019 she was in a relationship with the actor Juraj Bača. In 2021 she married the Catholic journalist Michal Magušin.

Magušinová supports charities helping children with cancer and composed songs to fundraise for the cause.

== Awards and nominations ==
- 2013, 2018 ZAI Awards
- 2018, 2019 OTO Awards
- 2019 Crystal Wing
