= 7th ZAI Awards =

Slovak music industry awards for 1996

7th ZAI Awards

Grammy West '96
- February 13, 1997
- New Scene, Bratislava, Slovakia

Presenter(s)
- Union of Authors and Performers (ZAI)
- Music Fund Slovakia (HF)

Broadcaster
STV1 (delay, on February 15, 1997)

Grand Prix
Elán

◄ 6th │ 8th ►

The 7th ZAI Awards, honoring the best in the Slovak music industry for individual achievements for the year of 1996, took time and place on February 13, 1997, at the New Scene Theater in Bratislava.

Subtitled as Grammy West '96, the ceremony was held in association with the local Music Fund (HF) and hosted by Miroslav Žbirka.

== Winners ==
=== Main categories ===
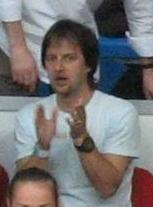
Pavol Habera

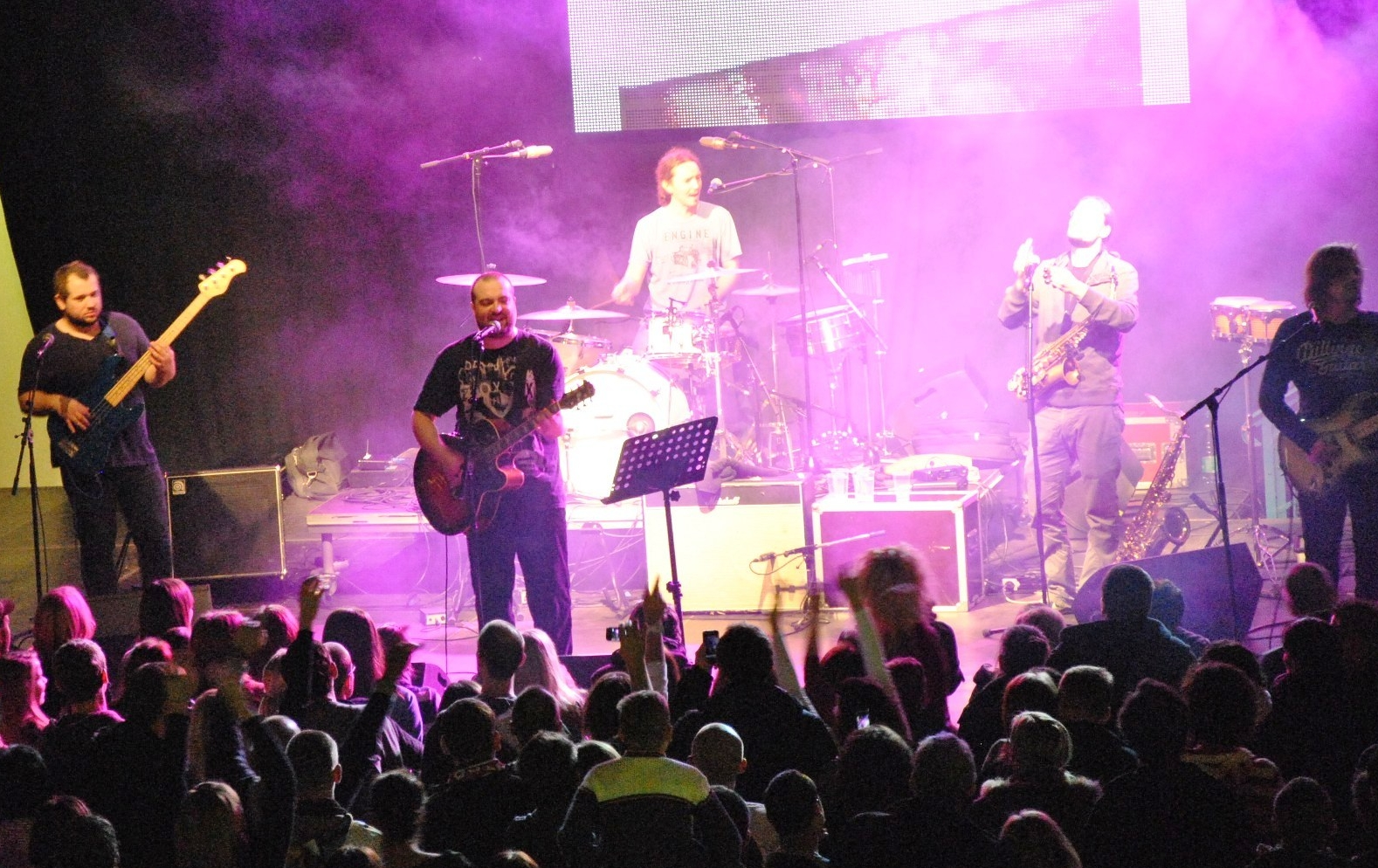
IMT Smile

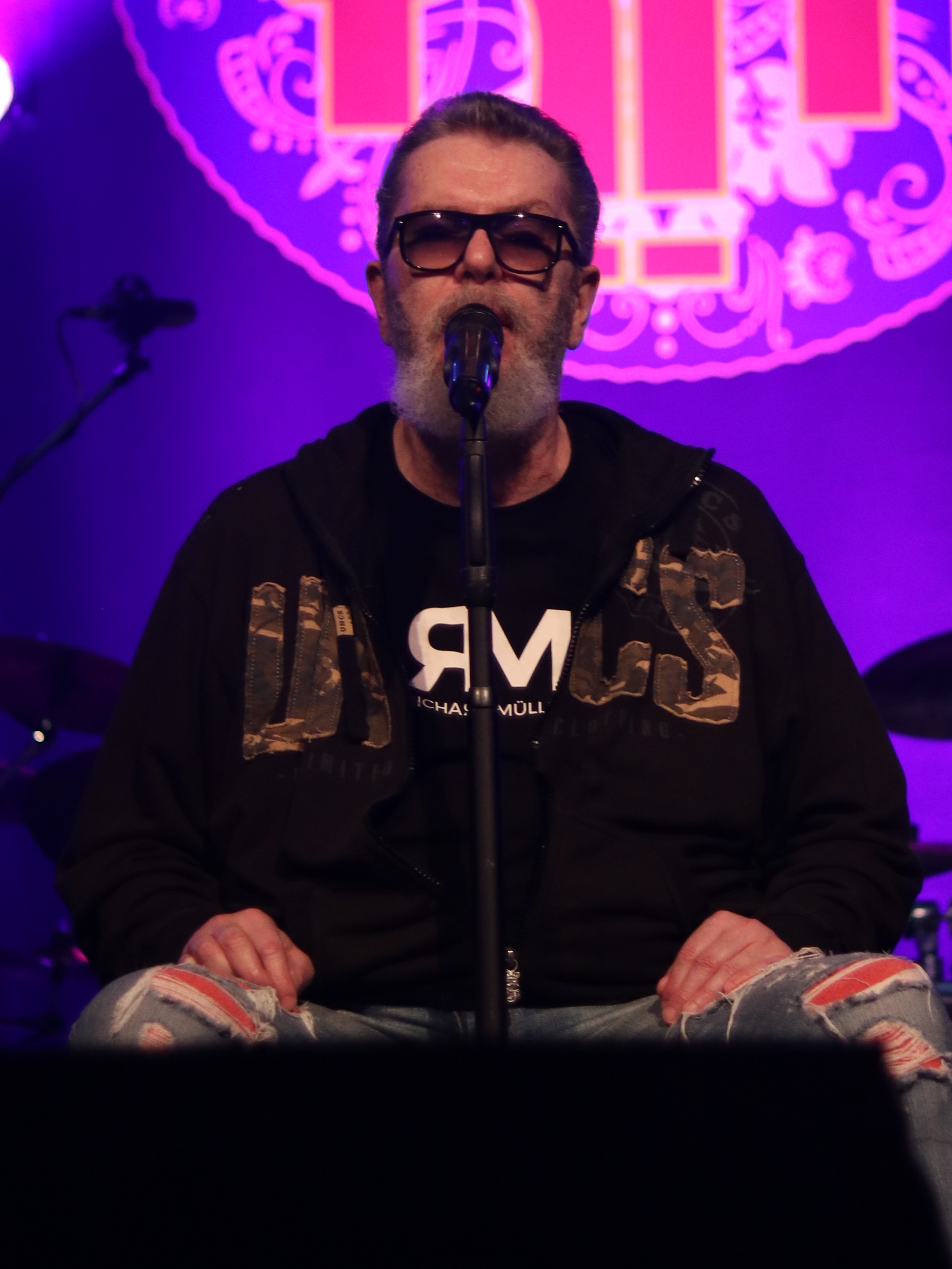
Richard Müller

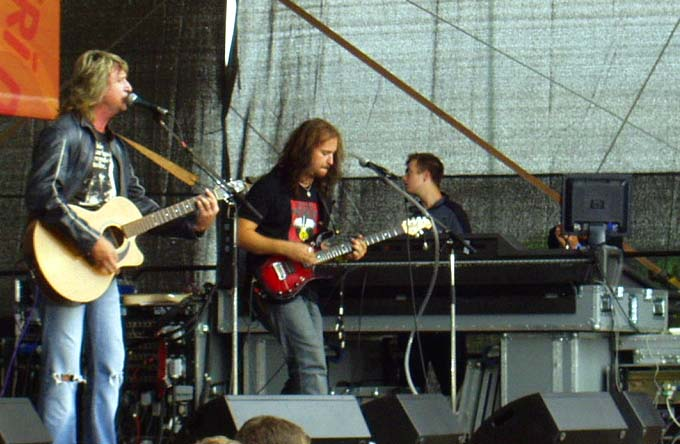
Gladiator

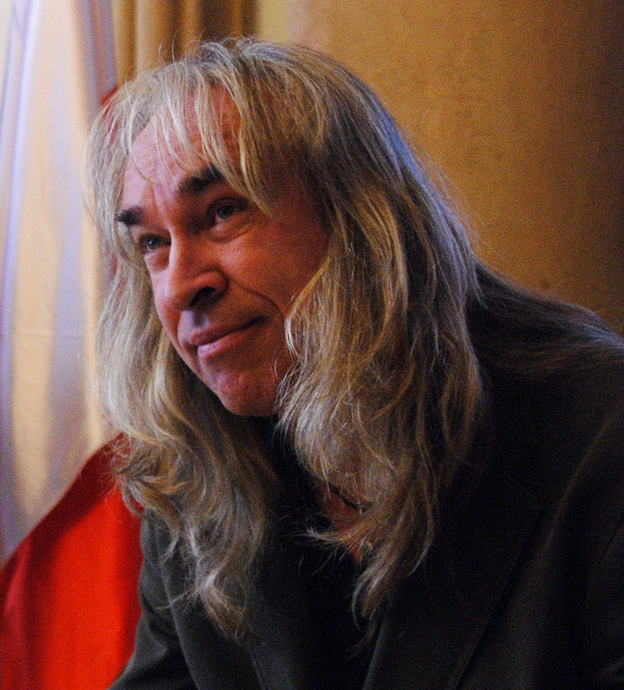
Marián Greksa

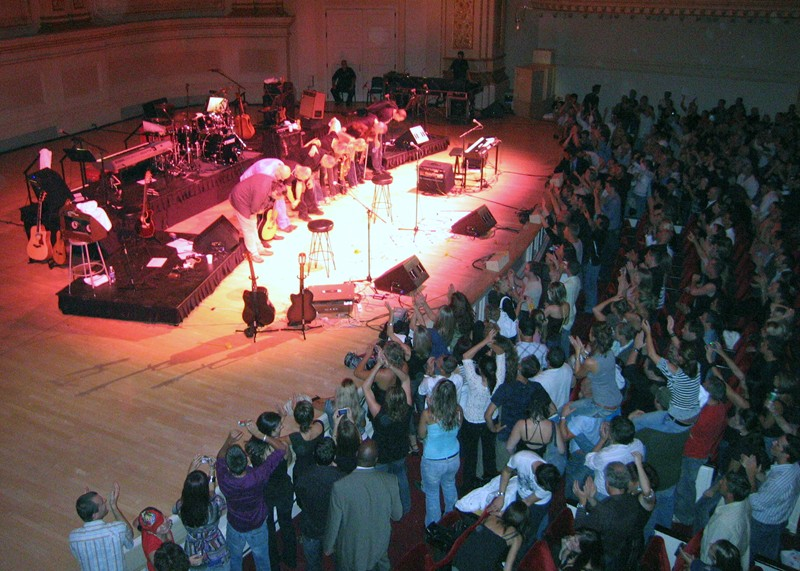
Elán

Vocal Artist or Ensemble	New Artist
★ Pavol Habera: Gladiator; MC Erik & Barbara; Peter Nagy; O.B.D.	★ IMT Smile: Bee M; D-Night; Lobby; Temeraf
Instrumental Artist(s)	Dancefloor Artist
★ Henrich Tóth – Breath: František Griglák • Pavol Horváth • Peter Uherčík – Magma; Andrej Šeban – Andrej Šeban Band...; Juraj Tatár – Svet lásku má (by P. Habera and VA)	★ D-Night: Bee M; Lobby; Maduar; MC Erik & Barbara
Writer	Song
★ Richard Müller – "Cigaretka na dva ťahy" (by Himself): Marián Greksa – "Tak dokedy" (by Himself); Daniel Hevier – "Svet lásku má" (by P. Habera, P. Dvorský, K. Gott); Peter Nagy – "Svet je krásny zadok" (by Himself); Jozef Urban – "Zdemolovaný kríž" (by J. Lehotský)	★ "Svet lásku má" (by P. Habera, P. Dvorský, K. Gott) – Daniel Hevier (lyrics) • Pavol Habera (music): "Vetroň" (by Hex) – Martin Žúži (lyrics) • Žúži and Peter Dudák (music); "Biely strom" (by O.B.D.) – Unknown; "Nepoznám" (by IMT Smile) – Vladimír Krausz (lyrics) • Ivan Tásler (music); "Say U Love Me" (by D-Night) – Unknown
Record	Album
★ Svet lásku má (by P. Habera and VA) • Dogstime (by Gladiator) – Ján Došek with Otto Nopp (Svet lásku má): Breath (by H. Tóth) – Ivan Jombík; LSD (by R. Müller) – Ivan Minárik; Magma (by F. Griglák, P. Horváth, P. Uherčík) – Juraj Kupec; Say U Love Me (by D-Night) • Second (by MC Erik & Barbara) • Ten (by Maduar) – Savid Studio	★ Svet lásku má – Pavol Habera and VA: Dogstime – Gladiator; Magma – František Griglák • Pavol Horváth • Peter Uherčík; LSD – Richard Müller; Breath – Henrich Tóth
Producer	Music Video
★ Július Kinček – Svet lásku má (by P. Habera and VA) • Second (by MC Erik & Barbara): Peter Nagy; Ladislav Lučenič; Michal Kovalčík – Dogstime (by Gladiator); Peter Uherčík	★ "Sweet Little Mouse" (by Gladiator) – Karol Vosátko: "Biely strom" (by O.B.D.) – Vladimír Balko; "Do What You Want" (by Bee M) – Roman Valentko; "Svet lásku má" (by P. Habera, P. Dvorský, K. Gott) – Juraj Johanides; "Tak dokedy" (by M. Greksa) – Avi • Espé Studios

=== Others ===
Grand Prix	★ Elán
