= Union of Authors and Performers =

Union of Authors and Performers Zväz autorov a interprétov populárnej hudby
- Abbreviation: ZAI
- Formation: 1990
- Type: Music organization
- Headquarters: Bratislava, Slovakia, EU
- Location(s): 15 Jakubovo námestie 811 09 Old Town, Bratislava
- Region served: Slovakia
- Members: Music Fund Slovakia (HF); Slovak Coalition for Cultural Diversity (SKKD)
- Official language: Slovak
- Chairman: Martin Sarvaš
- Main organ: ZAI Board
- Website: ZAI.eu.sk

Union of Authors and Performers, or rather Zväz autorov a interprétov populárnej hudby (ZAI), is a Slovak not-for-profit trade organization that works to increase brand recognition of the local music scene and its artists. Headquartered in Bratislava, the union was co-founded by Martin Sarvaš, and it is best known for holding the annual ZAI Awards in the country.

== History ==
The origin of the organization dates back to the 1990s, when it produced samplers for new local artists to promote their work on a national level. Apart from that, the association published the Music Report magazine in the region, as well held a music festival called Non Stop Rock Show.

== ZAI Awards ==
Chronological list of annual ceremonies of the ZAI Awards as held by
Union of Authors and Performers (ZAI) in association with Music Fund Slovakia (HF) and IFPI Slovakia (SNS IFPI)
| Year | Name | Date | Venue | Presenter(s) | | | Producer | Broadcaster | Ref |
|---|---|---|---|---|---|---|---|---|---|
| 1990 | ZAI Awards | 1991 | Hotel Kiev, BA | ZAI | | | TBD | STV^{[A]} | |
| 1991 | ZAI Awards | To be defined | | ZAI | TBD | | TBD | STV^{[A]} | — |
| 1992 | ZAI Awards | To be defined | | ZAI | TBD | | TBD | STV^{[A]} | — |
| 1993 | ZAI Awards | February 1994 | BA | ZAI | TBD | | TBD | STV^{[A]} | |
| 1994 | ZAI Awards | February 24, 1995 | PKO, BA | ZAI | TBD | | TBD | STV^{[A]} | |
| 1995 | ZAI Awards | March 2, 1996 | West Theater, BA | ZAI | HF | | TBD | STV^{[A]} | |
| 1996 | Grammy Awards | February 13, 1997 | NS, BA | ZAI | HF | | TBD | STV^{[A]} | |
| 1997 | Grammy Awards | March 2, 1998 | NS, BA | ZAI | HF | | TBD | STV^{[A]} | |
| 1998 | Artmedia Awards | February 26, 1999 | NS, BA | ZAI | HF | SNS; IFPI | TBD | STV^{[A]} | |
| 1999 | Artmedia Awards | February 25, 2000 | PKO, BA | ZAI | HF | SNS; IFPI | TBD | STV^{[A]} | |
| 2000 | Artmedia Awards | March 9, 2001 | DK Zrkadlový háj, BA | ZAI | HF | SNS; IFPI | TBD | Markíza | |
| 2001 | Aurel Awards held instead | | | | | SNS; IFPI | | | |
| 2002 | Aurel Awards held instead | | | | | SNS; IFPI | | | |
| 2003 | Aurel Awards held instead | | | | | SNS; IFPI | | | |
| 2004 | Aurel Awards held instead | | | | | SNS; IFPI | | | |
| 2005 | Aurel Awards held instead | | | | | SNS; IFPI | | | |
| 2006 | Aurel Awards held instead | | | | | SNS; IFPI | | | |
| 2007 | Aurel Awards held instead | | | | | SNS; IFPI | | | |
| 2008 | Not held | | | | | | | | |
| 2009 | Not held | | | | | | | | |
| 2010 | Not held | | | | | | | | — |
| 2011 | Held biennially | April 26, 2012 | Hotel Crowne Plaza, BA | | | | | | |
| 2012 | Held biennially | | | | | | | | — |
| 2013 | Held biennially | February 13, 2014 | V-klub, BA | | Hudba.sk^{[B]} | | National Public Center | | |
| 2014 | Held biennially | | | | | | | | — |
| Notes | Fri Sat Thu Mon | | BA denotes Bratislava | | | | | | |
A Until 1997, the annual ceremonies of the ZAI Awards were broadcast delay and edited.; B The music web portal Hudba.sk presented online poll–based awards only.
