= ZAI Awards =

Slovak music accolade

- ZAI Awards trophy from 2013
- Awarded for: Excellence in the Slovak music industry
- Venue: V–klub, Bratislava
- Country: Slovakia
- Presented by: Union of Authors and Performers (ZAI); Music Fund Slovakia (HF); IFPI Slovakia (SNS IFPI)
- Formerly called: Grammy Awards (1996–1997); Artmedia Awards (1998–2000); Aurel Awards (2001–2007)
- First award: 1991

Television/radio coverage
- Network: STV (1990–1999); Markíza (2000)

The ZAI Awards (Hudobný fond or HF) are a Slovak music accolade presented by Zväz autorov a interprétov populárnej hudby (ZAI) to recognize outstanding achievements in the industry for the preceding year in the region. In the early phase, the annual ceremonies were held in association with the local Music Fund (HF) and International Federation of the Phonographic Industry Slovakia (SNS IFPI). For that reason, their follow-up equivalents were frequently renamed; once after the American Gramies (1996–1997).

Following a 1997 protest of the U.S. NARAS management against the Czech music awards, also called likewise, the Slovak organization decided to change the adopted name too, renaming then trophies after the Artmedia Music Academy (1998–2000), also established by ZAI.

In 2001, the event was separately rebranded by SNS IFPI for the Aurel Awards (2001–2007), for a change, prior to their hiatus. Restored by the ZAI union in 2011 under their original title, the current awards are presented on a biennial basis, honoring mostly the hosting achievements in the music genre since. As of 2015, twenty annual ceremonies were held, with thirteen credited to ZAI, and seven to now discontinued SNS IFPI.

== History ==
- 1990–2000: ZAI Awards
  - 1996–1997: As Grammy Awards (Grammy West '96 ▪ Grammy Slovakia '97)
  - 1998–2000: As Artmedia Awards
- 2001–2007: Aurel Awards held instead
- 2008–2010: Not held
- 2011–present: ZAI Awards (held biennially)

== Categories ==
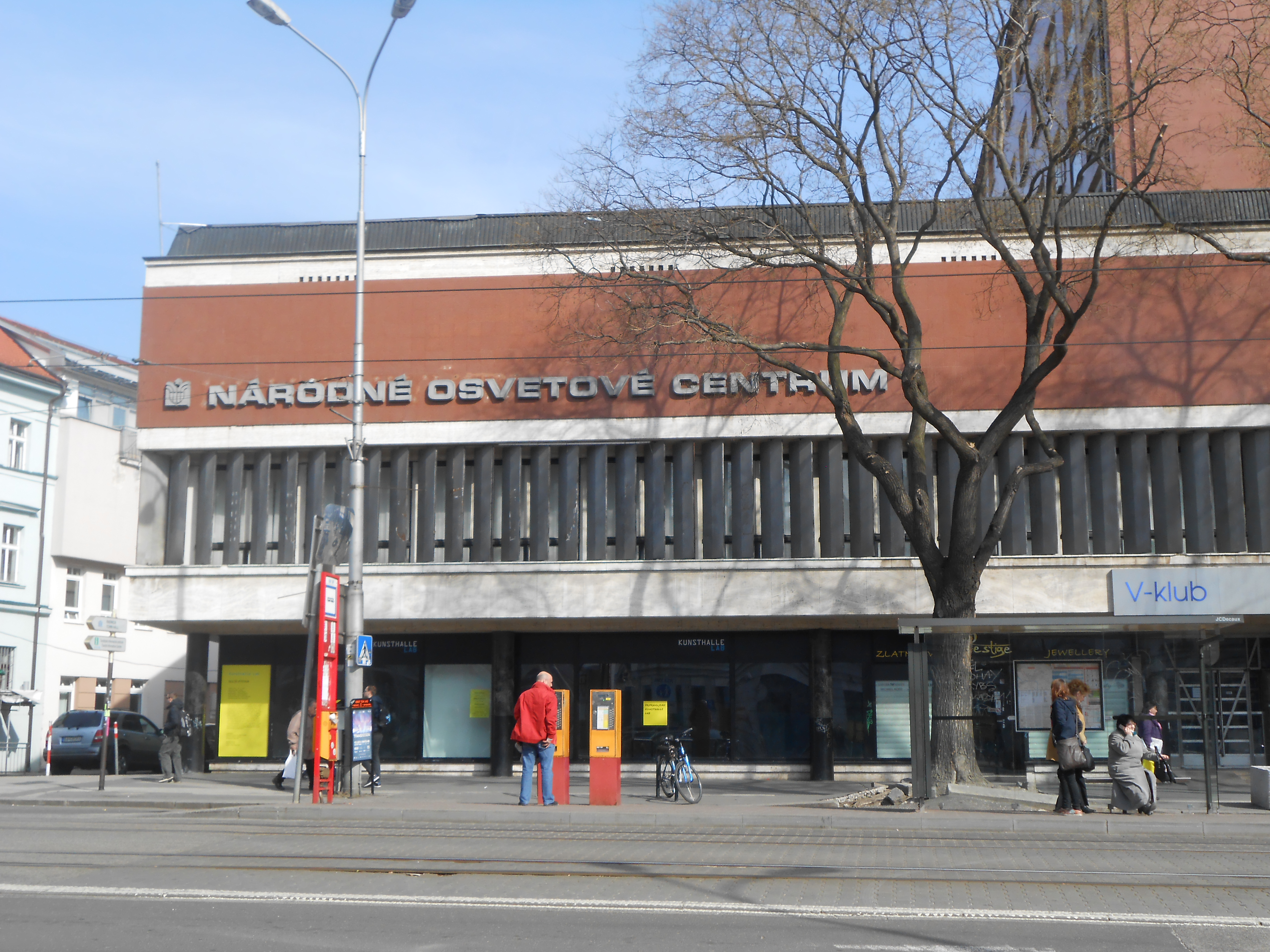
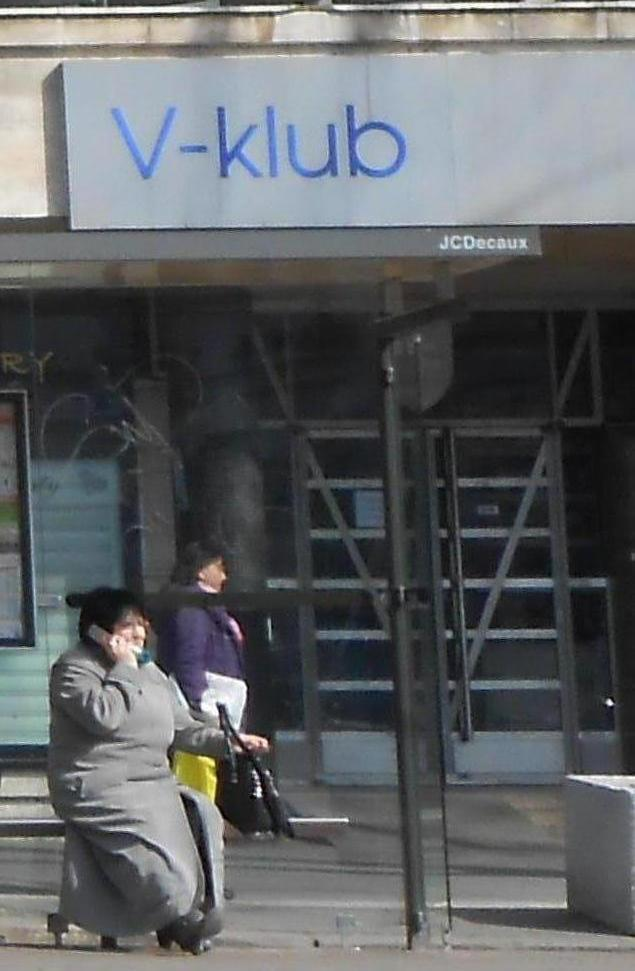
V–klub, the most recent venue of the ZAI awards. An old music club located at the National Public Center (NOC) in the Old Town, Bratislava, is often nicknamed "Véčko".

=== Current awards ===
- Vocal Artist or Ensemble • Held since, excluding 1998–2000 and 2011.
- New Artist • Held since, excluding 2011.
- Album • Held since 1991, excluding 2011.
- Radio Station • Held since 2011.
- Radio Host • Held since 2011.
- Music Festival • Held since 2011.
- Music Club • Held since 2011.
- Music Presenter • Held since 2011.

Special awards

- Hall of Fame • Lifetime achievement award, formerly known as Grand Prix (1990–2000), given for outstanding contributions to the industry, mainly for performing.

=== Retired awards ===
- Vocal Ensemble • Held in 1998–2000.
- Vocal Artist • Held in 1998–1999.
- Vocal Male Artist • Held in 2000.
- Vocal Female Artist • Held in 2000.
- Record
- Song
- Producer • Held in 1991–2000.
- Music Video
- Writer • Given for lyrics. Held until 2000, excluding 1998.
- Instrumental Artist • Held until 2000.
- Cover Art • Held in 1998–2000.
- Dancefloor Artist • Held in 1996–1997.
- Vocal Male Artist – Classical • Held only in 2000.
- Vocal Female Artist – Classical • Held only in 2000.
- Vocal Ensemble – Classical • Held only in 2000.
- Vocal Male Artist – Traditional • Held only in 2000.
- Vocal Female Artist – Traditional • Held only in 2000.
- Vocal Ensemble – Traditional • Held only in 2000.
- Album – Traditional • Held only in 2000.
- Music Act • Held only in 2000.
- Special Mention Award • Individual achievement award, given only in 1998–1999.

== Ceremonies ==
The listed years are of official release, annual ceremonies are held the following year.

- 1st ZAI Awards (1990)
- 2nd ZAI Awards (1991)
- 3rd ZAI Awards (1992)
- 4th ZAI Awards (1993)
- 5th ZAI Awards (1994)
- 6th ZAI Awards (1995)
- 7th ZAI Grammy West Awards (1996)
- 8th ZAI Grammy Slovakia Awards (1997)
- 9th ZAI Artmedia Awards (1998)
- 10th ZAI Artmedia Awards (1999)
- 11th ZAI Artmedia Awards (2000)
- 12th ZAI Awards (2011)
- 13th ZAI Awards (2013)

== See also ==
- Slávik Awards
