= 12th ZAI Awards =

Slovak music industry awards for 2011

12th ZAI Awards

- April 26, 2012
- Hotel Crowne Plaza, Bratislava, Slovakia

Presenter
Union of Authors and Performers (ZAI)

Hall of Fame
Pavol Zelenay

◄ 11th │ 13th ►

The 12th ZAI Awards, honoring the best in the Slovak music industry for individual achievements for the year of 2011, took time and place on April 26, 2012, at the Hotel Crowne Plaza in Bratislava. The annual ceremony hosted Martin Sarvaš, the chairman of the ZAI organization.

== Winners and nominees ==
=== Main categories ===
| Radio Station | Radio Host |
|---|---|
| ★ Rádio Aligátor – Bratislava (now Aligator – Classic Rock Radio): Rádio Hey! – Bratislava; Rádio Kiss – Košice; Radio One – Nitra; RTVS – Bratislava | ★ Roman Bomboš (RTVS): Rastislav Andris (RTVS); Vladimír Franc (RTVS); Soňa Horňáková (RTVS); Robert Majling (RA) |
| Music Festival | Music Club |
| ★ Topfest – Nové Mesto: Bratislavské jazzové dni – Bratislava; One Day Jazz Fest – Bratislava; Terchovský Budzogáň – Terchová; Víkend Legiend – Nové Mesto | ★ Majestic Music Club – Bratislava: Blue Note – Nové Mesto; Café Razy – Poprad; Klub 77 – Banská Bystrica; Music Gallery – Bratislava |
Music Presenter
★ Dušan Drobný – Agentúra Duna, Piešťany (tie) ★ Tibor Zelenay – Blue Note, Nové Mesto (tie); Rudolf Hošna – Ateliér Babylon, Bratislava; Benjamin Pascoe – Next Apache, Bratislava; Juraj Šebo – Bigbítové Vianoce, Bratislava

=== Others ===
| Hall of Fame | ★ Pavol Zelenay |
