= Peter Lipa =

Slovak jazz musician (born 1943)

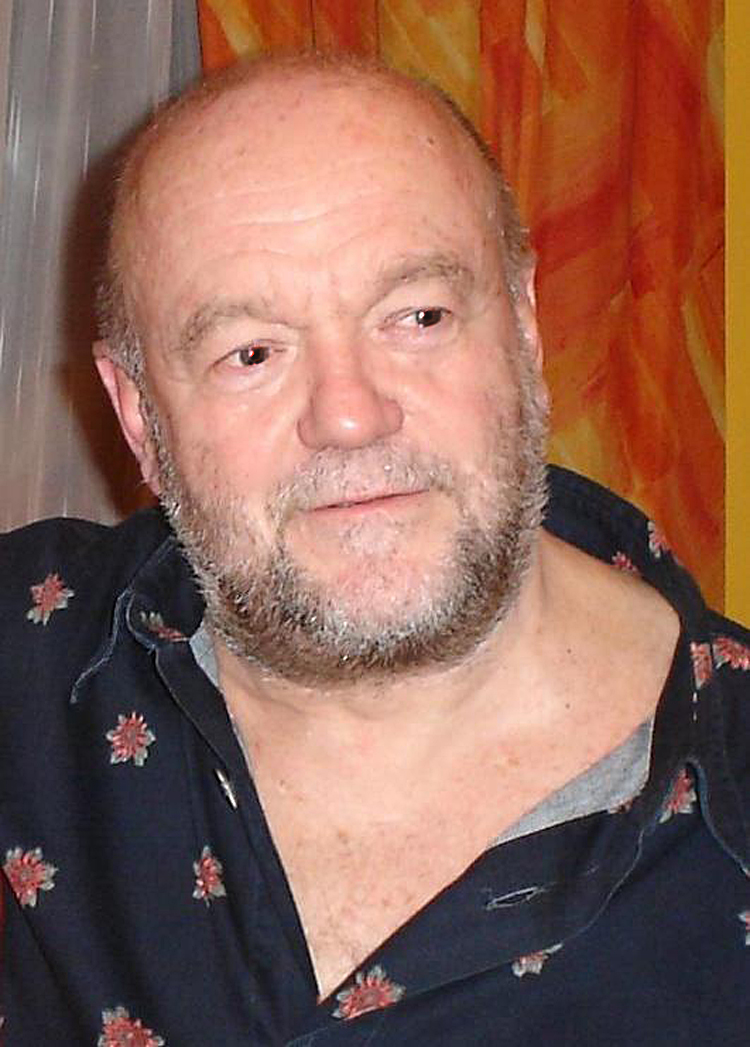

Background information
- Born: May 30, 1943 (age 82); Prešov, Slovak Republic
- Genres: Jazz, blues
- Occupations: Singer, songwriter
- Instruments: Violin, trumpet, trombone, guitar
- Years active: 1963–present
- Label: East-West Promotion
- Website: peterlipa.com

Peter Lipa (born May 30, 1943) is a Slovak singer, composer, and promoter of jazz. He has been called the Father of Slovak Jazz. Lipa is regarded as the most significant figure in the Slovak jazz scene. He developed a unique vocal style that focused on the lyrics. His music is influenced by performers including Jimmy Rushing, Ray Charles, Al Jarreau, Joe Cocker, and Bobby McFerrin, and is a mix of jazz and blues. He was the first jazz singer to use Slovak.

== Life and career ==
Lipa was born in Prešov to Hungarian-Jewish parents and has worked in Czechoslovakia, the Czech Republic, and Slovakia. His roots are in blues, soul, and classical music and his work rock and jazz standards.

In 2003, he released an album called Beatles in Blue(s) with versions of sixteen songs by The Beatles. He and his arrangers and musicians intended to create the most unusual renditions they could imagine. Some songs, such as "Every Little Thing" and "I Wanna Be Your Man", are recorded so differently from the original versions that only the lyrics remain. In each case, the tempo, rhythm, chord changes, and melody are new.

Three of his studio albums have been listed among The 100 Greatest Slovak Albums of All Time, such as Lipa spieva Lasicu (2005), at number fifty-eight, ...v najlepších rokoch (2001), at number sixty-three, and Naspäť na stromy (1995), at number eighty-one. His album 68 (2012) peaked at number forty-eight on the Czech Albums Chart.

== Discography ==
=== Studio albums ===
- 1983: Neúprosné ráno (OPUS, #9115 1460; aka Moanin')
- 1987: Škrtni, co se nehodí (Supraphon, #1115 4206) with Luboš Andršt Blues Band
- 1987: Je to stále tak (OPUS, #9315 1940; aka That's the Way It Is)
- 1987: Peter Lipa a T+R Band with T+R Band (OPUS)
- 1992: Svíčka a stín (Panton, #81 1223-2 331) with Eva Olmerová and Jana Koubková
- 1995: Naspäť na stromy (East West Promotion, #1994-001) with Andrej Šeban, Juraj Griglák, Juraj Bartoš and Gabo Jonáš
- 1998: Čierny Peter (BMG Ariola) with Andrej Šeban, Juraj Tatár, Gašpar and Marcel Buntaj
- 2001: ...v najlepších rokoch (Millennium Records & Publishing, #834 006)
- 2005: Lipa spieva Lasicu (Platinum, number #11 on the CZ Top 50 Prodejní.)
- 2005: Jana Kirschner, Peter Lipa, Boboš Procházka with Jana Kirschner and Boboš Procházka
- 2012: 68 (number #48 on the CZ Top 50 Prodejní.)

=== Export and English albums ===
- 1984: Moanin' (OPUS, #9115 1461) (Note: Both albums, Moanin and That's the Way It Is, were re-issued as a box set entitled La La La (1998).)
- 1988: That's the Way It Is (OPUS, #9313 1988)
- 1988: Blues Office (Supraphon, #1115 4255) with Luboš Andršt Blues Band
- 1995: Up to date with T+R Band
- 1997: Boogie Up (PolyGram / EmArcy) with Peter Breiner (Note: Breiner's performance is uncredited on the front cover.)
- 2000: Bistro (BMG Ariola) with Band (Note: The release also features two tracks sung in Slovak, namely "V súkromnom bistre" and "Pamäť".)
- 2003: Beatles in Blue(s) (Note: The work features cover versions by The Beatles.)

=== Live albums ===
- 1984: Blues z lipového dřeva (Supraphon, #1115 3109) with Luboš Andršt Blues Band

== Awards ==
| Year | Nominated work | Award | Category | Result |
Major awards and/or nominations
| 1993 | Himself | Ladislav Martoník Award | Best Performance in Jazz | Won |
| 1994 | Naspäť na stromy | ZAI Awards | Producer of the Year^{[A]} | Won |
| 1995 | "Balada o štyroch koňoch" | ZAI Awards | Music Video of the Year^{[B]} | Won |
| 1998 | Himself | Crystal Wing Awards | Music Act of the Year | Won |
| 1999 | "Maturantky" | ZAI Awards | Music Video of the Year^{[C]} | Won |
| 2005 | Himself | Aurel Awards | Male Vocal Performance of the Year | Won |
| 2005 | Himself | Aurel Awards | Record Producer of the Year^{[D]} | Won |
| 2005 | Lipa spieva Lasicu | Aurel Awards | Record of the Year^{[E]} | Won |
| 2005 | Lipa spieva Lasicu | Aurel Awards | Record of the Year in Jazz/Blues | Won |
| 2005 | Lipa spieva Lasicu | Aurel Awards | Artwork of the Year^{[F]} | Won |
| 2005 | Lipa spieva Lasicu | Aurel Awards | Album of the Year | Nominated |
| 2010 | Himself | Bratislavian Blueberry | Personality of the Year | Won |
Music polls
| 1983 | Himself | Jazz Forum Award | European Jazz Vocalist | Nominated |
| 1998 | Himself | Slávik Awards | People's Choice – Male Singer | 19th place |
| 1999 | Himself | Slávik Awards | People's Choice – Male Singer | 13th place |
| 2000 | Himself | Slávik Awards | People's Choice – Male Singer | 14th place |
| 2001 | Himself | Slávik Awards | People's Choice – Male Singer | 12th place |
| 2002 | Himself | Slávik Awards | People's Choice – Male Singer | 18th place |
| 2003 | Himself | Slávik Awards | People's Choice – Male Singer | 24th place |
| 2004 | Himself | Slávik Awards | People's Choice – Male Singer | 21st Place |
| 2005 | Himself | Slávik Awards | People's Choice – Male Singer | 8th place |
| 2006 | Himself | Slávik Awards | People's Choice – Male Singer | 19th place |
| 2007 | Himself | Slávik Awards | People's Choice – Male Singer | 29th place |
| 2008 | Himself | Slávik Awards | People's Choice – Male Singer | 32nd Place |
| 2009 | Himself | Slávik Awards | People's Choice – Male Singer | 17th place |
| 2010 | Himself | Slávik Awards | People's Choice – Male Singer | 31st Place |
| 2011 | Himself | Slávik Awards | People's Choice – Male Singer | 17th place |
| 2012 | Himself | Slávik Awards | People's Choice – Male Singer | 21st Place |
Lifetime honors and other achievements
| 1987 | Himself | Merited Artist | | Honored |
| 2000 | Himself | ZAI Awards | The Hall of Fame | Honored |
| 2003 | Himself | Ľudovít Štúr Order – Class III | Culture and Art^{[G]} | Honored |
| 2007 | Lipa spieva Lasicu | Best Slovak Album of All Time | | 58th place |
| 2007 | ...v najlepších rokoch | Best Slovak Album of All Time | | 63rd Place |
| 2007 | Naspäť na stromy | Best Slovak Album of All Time | | 81st Place |
The years are listed in order of the respective years, the annual ceremonies are usually held the next.

Notes

- A The award credited to Andrej Šeban and shared with another album produced by himself, Part I by Made 2 Mate.
- B The award credited to Gratex company.
- C The award credited to Adnan Hamzić.
- D The award shared with Juraj Tatár, Martin Gašpar and Peter Lipa Jr.
- E The award credited to Ľuboš Války a Juraj Kupec.
- F The award credited to Marek Ormandík.
- G Ľudovít Štúr Order denotes a state decoration, bestowed by the president of the country.

== See also ==
- Slovak popular music
- The 100 Greatest Slovak Albums of All Time
- Honorific nicknames in popular music

== Bibliography ==
- Lipa, Peter; Kollár, Jozef (2003). Maverick: My Life with Jazz (in Slovak). Bratislava, Slovakia: Ikar. p. 157. ISBN 978-80-5510-534-5. OCLC 58536847.
