= List of minor planets: 541001–542000 =

The following is a partial list of minor planets, running from minor-planet number 541001 through 542000, inclusive. The primary data for this and other partial lists is based on JPL's "Small-Body Orbital Elements" and data available from the Minor Planet Center. Critical list information is also provided by the MPC, unless otherwise specified from Lowell Observatory. A detailed description of the table's columns and additional sources are given on the main page including a complete list of every page in this series, and a statistical break-up on the dynamical classification of minor planets.

Also see the summary list of all named bodies in numerical and alphabetical order, and the corresponding naming citations for the number range of this particular list. New namings may only be added to this list after official publication, as the preannouncement of names is condemned by the Working Group for Small Bodies Nomenclature of the International Astronomical Union.

Near-Earth obj.	MBA (inner)	MBA (outer)	Centaur
Mars-crosser	MBA (middle)	Jupiter trojan	Trans-Neptunian obj.
Unclassified

== 541001–541100 ==
Designation			Discovery			Properties		Ref
Permanent	Provisional	Named after	Date	Site	Discoverer(s)	Category	Diam.	Ref
541001	2017 XF_{58}	—	January 17, 2015	Kitt Peak	Spacewatch	·	940 m	MPC · JPL
541002	2017 XU_{58}	—	October 7, 2004	Kitt Peak	Spacewatch	·	500 m	MPC · JPL
541003	2017 XV_{58}	—	November 30, 2005	Kitt Peak	Spacewatch	·	1.7 km	MPC · JPL
541004	2017 XX_{58}	—	October 23, 2004	Kitt Peak	Spacewatch	EUN	1.0 km	MPC · JPL
541005	2017 XZ_{58}	—	March 18, 2009	Kitt Peak	Spacewatch	·	1.2 km	MPC · JPL
541006	2017 XH_{59}	—	May 29, 2012	Mount Lemmon	Mount Lemmon Survey	EUN	1.4 km	MPC · JPL
541007	2017 XJ_{59}	—	January 13, 2008	Kitt Peak	Spacewatch	EOS	1.7 km	MPC · JPL
541008	2017 XS_{62}	—	March 24, 2014	Haleakala	Pan-STARRS 1	·	2.6 km	MPC · JPL
541009	2017 XE_{63}	—	April 25, 2015	Haleakala	Pan-STARRS 1	HNS	1.0 km	MPC · JPL
541010	2017 XK_{63}	—	August 10, 2010	Kitt Peak	Spacewatch	(45637) · CYB	3.2 km	MPC · JPL
541011	2017 YJ_{2}	—	February 1, 2009	Kitt Peak	Spacewatch	·	2.5 km	MPC · JPL
541012	2017 YP_{2}	—	November 26, 2012	Mount Lemmon	Mount Lemmon Survey	·	2.1 km	MPC · JPL
541013	2017 YQ_{2}	—	March 21, 2010	WISE	WISE	·	2.3 km	MPC · JPL
541014	2017 YR_{2}	—	May 28, 2008	Kitt Peak	Spacewatch	EUP	3.1 km	MPC · JPL
541015	2017 YT_{2}	—	January 13, 1996	Kitt Peak	Spacewatch	·	1.8 km	MPC · JPL
541016	2017 YA_{5}	—	September 27, 2008	Catalina	CSS	HNS	1.4 km	MPC · JPL
541017	2017 YX_{7}	—	September 18, 2006	Catalina	CSS	·	3.4 km	MPC · JPL
541018	2017 YY_{7}	—	August 23, 2004	Siding Spring	SSS	·	1.6 km	MPC · JPL
541019	2017 YB_{9}	—	October 19, 2011	Catalina	CSS	·	3.5 km	MPC · JPL
541020	2017 YJ_{9}	—	May 4, 2005	Kitt Peak	Spacewatch	·	2.2 km	MPC · JPL
541021	2017 YK_{9}	—	September 25, 2009	Mount Lemmon	Mount Lemmon Survey	·	1.4 km	MPC · JPL
541022	2017 YD_{11}	—	April 19, 2015	Kitt Peak	Spacewatch	·	2.9 km	MPC · JPL
541023	2017 YL_{11}	—	February 1, 2005	Kitt Peak	Spacewatch	·	880 m	MPC · JPL
541024	2017 YN_{14}	—	September 4, 2008	Kitt Peak	Spacewatch	·	1.8 km	MPC · JPL
541025	2017 YO_{14}	—	October 18, 1996	Kitt Peak	Spacewatch	·	1.8 km	MPC · JPL
541026	2017 YE_{15}	—	August 6, 2005	Siding Spring	SSS	EUP	4.7 km	MPC · JPL
541027	2017 YQ_{15}	—	August 20, 2004	Catalina	CSS	·	3.3 km	MPC · JPL
541028	2017 YU_{15}	—	August 11, 2004	Campo Imperatore	CINEOS	·	1.3 km	MPC · JPL
541029	2018 AB_{1}	—	December 17, 2009	Mount Lemmon	Mount Lemmon Survey	·	2.6 km	MPC · JPL
541030	2018 AM_{5}	—	October 15, 2012	Haleakala	Pan-STARRS 1	·	1.4 km	MPC · JPL
541031	2018 AR_{5}	—	December 21, 2000	Kitt Peak	Spacewatch	·	2.1 km	MPC · JPL
541032	2018 AY_{8}	—	October 6, 2012	Haleakala	Pan-STARRS 1	·	2.3 km	MPC · JPL
541033	2018 AM_{9}	—	October 13, 2006	Kitt Peak	Spacewatch	(2076)	900 m	MPC · JPL
541034	2018 AE_{16}	—	July 27, 2009	Catalina	CSS	·	3.4 km	MPC · JPL
541035	2018 AE_{17}	—	December 3, 2012	Mount Lemmon	Mount Lemmon Survey	·	2.2 km	MPC · JPL
541036	2018 AH_{17}	—	July 25, 2006	Mount Lemmon	Mount Lemmon Survey	·	2.3 km	MPC · JPL
541037	2018 BE	—	May 21, 2006	Catalina	CSS	·	3.7 km	MPC · JPL
541038	2018 BW_{8}	—	July 25, 2010	WISE	WISE	·	4.2 km	MPC · JPL
541039	2018 BG_{9}	—	October 1, 2005	Anderson Mesa	LONEOS	EOS	2.7 km	MPC · JPL
541040	2018 BS_{9}	—	August 14, 2004	Campo Imperatore	CINEOS	·	3.7 km	MPC · JPL
541041	2018 BW_{9}	—	August 28, 2006	Kitt Peak	Spacewatch	·	1.9 km	MPC · JPL
541042	2018 BN_{10}	—	April 13, 2010	Catalina	CSS	HNS	1.9 km	MPC · JPL
541043	2018 BQ_{10}	—	January 24, 2006	Kitt Peak	Spacewatch	·	4.1 km	MPC · JPL
541044	2018 BN_{11}	—	March 11, 2008	Mount Lemmon	Mount Lemmon Survey	EOS	1.6 km	MPC · JPL
541045	2018 BN_{12}	—	July 1, 2014	Haleakala	Pan-STARRS 1	·	2.2 km	MPC · JPL
541046	2018 CF_{4}	—	December 27, 2003	Kitt Peak	Spacewatch	·	2.7 km	MPC · JPL
541047	2018 CH_{4}	—	February 9, 2005	Anderson Mesa	LONEOS	·	2.1 km	MPC · JPL
541048	2018 CX_{4}	—	February 2, 2000	Kitt Peak	Spacewatch	·	1.0 km	MPC · JPL
541049	2018 CD_{5}	—	March 9, 2005	Kitt Peak	Spacewatch	EUN	1.4 km	MPC · JPL
541050	2018 CF_{5}	—	January 19, 2005	Kitt Peak	Spacewatch	·	1.7 km	MPC · JPL
541051	2018 CP_{5}	—	January 18, 2009	Socorro	LINEAR	·	2.4 km	MPC · JPL
541052	2018 CS_{5}	—	June 23, 2010	WISE	WISE	·	4.0 km	MPC · JPL
541053	2018 CU_{5}	—	April 4, 2014	Mount Lemmon	Mount Lemmon Survey	·	1.6 km	MPC · JPL
541054	2018 CB_{6}	—	February 25, 2007	Catalina	CSS	EUP	4.3 km	MPC · JPL
541055	2018 CH_{6}	—	February 11, 2002	Socorro	LINEAR	·	1.4 km	MPC · JPL
541056	2018 CQ_{6}	—	January 19, 2009	Mount Lemmon	Mount Lemmon Survey	·	2.3 km	MPC · JPL
541057	2018 CD_{7}	—	May 22, 2003	Kitt Peak	Spacewatch	·	4.0 km	MPC · JPL
541058	2018 CM_{7}	—	October 22, 2006	Mount Lemmon	Mount Lemmon Survey	·	2.0 km	MPC · JPL
541059	2018 CQ_{8}	—	December 1, 2008	Mount Lemmon	Mount Lemmon Survey	·	1.5 km	MPC · JPL
541060	2018 CW_{8}	—	February 16, 2007	Catalina	CSS	H	710 m	MPC · JPL
541061	2018 CK_{11}	—	March 10, 2007	Kitt Peak	Spacewatch	·	3.2 km	MPC · JPL
541062	2018 CL_{11}	—	October 20, 2006	Catalina	CSS	TRE	2.9 km	MPC · JPL
541063	2018 CN_{12}	—	September 3, 2008	Kitt Peak	Spacewatch	·	1.5 km	MPC · JPL
541064	2018 CP_{15}	—	February 9, 2007	Catalina	CSS	·	3.0 km	MPC · JPL
541065	2018 FU_{5}	—	December 7, 2005	Catalina	CSS	·	2.1 km	MPC · JPL
541066	2018 HX	—	January 15, 2002	Socorro	LINEAR	H	690 m	MPC · JPL
541067	2018 LX_{4}	—	September 16, 2003	Kitt Peak	Spacewatch	·	770 m	MPC · JPL
541068	2018 NP	—	March 30, 2010	WISE	WISE	·	7.1 km	MPC · JPL
541069	2018 NY_{3}	—	January 2, 2009	Kitt Peak	Spacewatch	EUP	5.7 km	MPC · JPL
541070	2018 NV_{14}	—	January 27, 2004	Kitt Peak	Spacewatch	MAR	1.1 km	MPC · JPL
541071	2018 NB_{15}	—	September 25, 2005	Catalina	CSS	·	540 m	MPC · JPL
541072	2018 OE_{1}	—	September 29, 2003	Kitt Peak	Spacewatch	PHO	1.5 km	MPC · JPL
541073	2018 PK_{23}	—	February 25, 2011	Mount Lemmon	Mount Lemmon Survey	·	2.7 km	MPC · JPL
541074	2018 PE_{26}	—	September 29, 2003	Anderson Mesa	LONEOS	·	2.5 km	MPC · JPL
541075	2018 PG_{26}	—	October 23, 2008	Kitt Peak	Spacewatch	·	5.0 km	MPC · JPL
541076	2018 PH_{26}	—	May 2, 2006	Mount Lemmon	Mount Lemmon Survey	·	2.8 km	MPC · JPL
541077	2018 QX_{1}	—	January 11, 2008	Mount Lemmon	Mount Lemmon Survey	EUN	3.3 km	MPC · JPL
541078	2018 QS_{2}	—	September 3, 2014	Catalina	CSS	·	1.2 km	MPC · JPL
541079	2018 QF_{4}	—	November 6, 2010	Mount Lemmon	Mount Lemmon Survey	·	2.6 km	MPC · JPL
541080	2018 QZ_{4}	—	October 18, 2007	Anderson Mesa	LONEOS	·	3.8 km	MPC · JPL
541081	2018 QB_{5}	—	December 31, 2002	Socorro	LINEAR	·	4.3 km	MPC · JPL
541082	2018 QC_{5}	—	October 13, 2009	La Sagra	OAM	·	1.5 km	MPC · JPL
541083	2018 QC_{6}	—	November 1, 2008	Mount Lemmon	Mount Lemmon Survey	EOS	1.9 km	MPC · JPL
541084	2018 QG_{6}	—	December 3, 2008	Kitt Peak	Spacewatch	·	680 m	MPC · JPL
541085	2018 QH_{6}	—	September 28, 2011	Kitt Peak	Spacewatch	·	970 m	MPC · JPL
541086	2018 QQ_{6}	—	January 27, 2012	Mount Lemmon	Mount Lemmon Survey	·	1.7 km	MPC · JPL
541087	2018 QV_{6}	—	November 19, 2003	Kitt Peak	Spacewatch	·	1.6 km	MPC · JPL
541088	2018 QW_{6}	—	October 8, 2007	Catalina	CSS	·	3.0 km	MPC · JPL
541089	2018 QZ_{6}	—	May 21, 2005	Mount Lemmon	Mount Lemmon Survey	(1547)	1.6 km	MPC · JPL
541090	2018 RT	—	December 8, 2010	Mount Lemmon	Mount Lemmon Survey	(5)	1.4 km	MPC · JPL
541091	2018 RG_{1}	—	November 1, 2000	Socorro	LINEAR	·	790 m	MPC · JPL
541092	2018 RT_{2}	—	December 11, 2006	Kitt Peak	Spacewatch	·	1.5 km	MPC · JPL
541093	2018 RJ_{4}	—	September 2, 2003	Socorro	LINEAR	·	1.2 km	MPC · JPL
541094	2018 RX_{4}	—	January 17, 2001	Haleakala	NEAT	H	650 m	MPC · JPL
541095	2018 RE_{9}	—	April 25, 2003	Kitt Peak	Spacewatch	·	1.6 km	MPC · JPL
541096	2018 RS_{9}	—	October 6, 2008	Mount Lemmon	Mount Lemmon Survey	·	610 m	MPC · JPL
541097	2018 RU_{9}	—	September 12, 2004	Socorro	LINEAR	V	670 m	MPC · JPL
541098	2018 RW_{9}	—	April 16, 2007	Mount Lemmon	Mount Lemmon Survey	H	460 m	MPC · JPL
541099	2018 RY_{9}	—	November 20, 2003	Socorro	LINEAR	·	2.1 km	MPC · JPL
541100	2018 RQ_{10}	—	October 28, 2005	Mount Lemmon	Mount Lemmon Survey	·	1.6 km	MPC · JPL

== 541101–541200 ==
back to top

Designation			Discovery			Properties		Ref
Permanent	Provisional	Named after	Date	Site	Discoverer(s)	Category	Diam.	Ref
541101	2018 RF_{11}	—	October 1, 2010	La Sagra	OAM	EUN	850 m	MPC · JPL
541102	2018 RG_{11}	—	September 5, 2007	Catalina	CSS	·	2.6 km	MPC · JPL
541103	2018 RH_{11}	—	June 4, 2010	WISE	WISE	·	4.2 km	MPC · JPL
541104	2018 RN_{12}	—	May 5, 2010	Mount Lemmon	Mount Lemmon Survey	·	1.6 km	MPC · JPL
541105	2018 RG_{13}	—	October 27, 2005	Catalina	CSS	·	1.2 km	MPC · JPL
541106	2018 RL_{13}	—	October 23, 2006	Mount Lemmon	Mount Lemmon Survey	(5)	930 m	MPC · JPL
541107	2018 RZ_{13}	—	October 27, 2009	Mount Lemmon	Mount Lemmon Survey	GEF	1.2 km	MPC · JPL
541108	2018 RH_{14}	—	July 16, 2013	Haleakala	Pan-STARRS 1	EOS	1.6 km	MPC · JPL
541109	2018 RM_{14}	—	September 22, 2003	Anderson Mesa	LONEOS	·	1.0 km	MPC · JPL
541110	2018 RN_{14}	—	April 10, 2010	WISE	WISE	·	3.0 km	MPC · JPL
541111	2018 RQ_{14}	—	August 31, 2000	Socorro	LINEAR	·	970 m	MPC · JPL
541112	2018 RS_{14}	—	May 21, 2006	Kitt Peak	Spacewatch	·	3.4 km	MPC · JPL
541113	2018 RZ_{14}	—	September 12, 2007	Mount Lemmon	Mount Lemmon Survey	URS	4.6 km	MPC · JPL
541114	2018 RB_{15}	—	July 19, 2007	Mount Lemmon	Mount Lemmon Survey	·	1.1 km	MPC · JPL
541115	2018 RG_{16}	—	March 15, 2012	Mount Lemmon	Mount Lemmon Survey	·	1.6 km	MPC · JPL
541116	2018 RH_{16}	—	March 12, 2010	Kitt Peak	Spacewatch	·	1.2 km	MPC · JPL
541117	2018 RJ_{16}	—	October 1, 2000	Socorro	LINEAR	·	1.2 km	MPC · JPL
541118	2018 RZ_{16}	—	November 17, 1995	Kitt Peak	Spacewatch	·	960 m	MPC · JPL
541119	2018 RE_{17}	—	September 12, 2007	Catalina	CSS	·	3.2 km	MPC · JPL
541120	2018 RU_{17}	—	May 7, 2014	Haleakala	Pan-STARRS 1	PHO	1.1 km	MPC · JPL
541121	2018 RV_{18}	—	May 12, 2007	Mount Lemmon	Mount Lemmon Survey	·	1.4 km	MPC · JPL
541122	2018 RD_{22}	—	August 26, 2000	Socorro	LINEAR	H	440 m	MPC · JPL
541123	2018 RB_{23}	—	September 23, 2011	Mount Lemmon	Mount Lemmon Survey	·	890 m	MPC · JPL
541124	2018 RP_{23}	—	November 8, 2010	Mount Lemmon	Mount Lemmon Survey	·	1.2 km	MPC · JPL
541125	2018 RV_{23}	—	September 11, 2007	XuYi	PMO NEO Survey Program	·	3.0 km	MPC · JPL
541126	2018 RP_{24}	—	January 2, 2012	Mount Lemmon	Mount Lemmon Survey	·	1.4 km	MPC · JPL
541127	2018 RL_{26}	—	April 11, 2011	Mount Lemmon	Mount Lemmon Survey	EOS	2.2 km	MPC · JPL
541128	2018 RB_{27}	—	August 30, 2008	La Sagra	OAM	NAE	3.5 km	MPC · JPL
541129	1995 FW_{11}	—	March 27, 1995	Kitt Peak	Spacewatch	·	1.0 km	MPC · JPL
541130	2003 BW_{35}	—	January 26, 2003	Kitt Peak	Spacewatch	PAD	1.8 km	MPC · JPL
541131	2004 RC_{145}	—	September 9, 2004	Socorro	LINEAR	·	1.1 km	MPC · JPL
541132 Leleākūhonua	2015 TG_{387}	Leleākūhonua	October 13, 2015	Mauna Kea	D. J. Tholen, C. A. Trujillo, S. S. Sheppard	sednoid	220 km	MPC · JPL
541133	2002 QN_{103}	—	August 18, 2002	Palomar	NEAT	·	3.2 km	MPC · JPL
541134	2002 RP_{230}	—	September 15, 2002	Palomar	NEAT	·	3.1 km	MPC · JPL
541135	2002 VK_{91}	—	November 4, 2002	Kitt Peak	Spacewatch	·	1.8 km	MPC · JPL
541136	2003 WR_{17}	—	November 18, 2003	Palomar	NEAT	·	4.5 km	MPC · JPL
541137	2004 XW_{36}	—	December 11, 2004	Campo Imperatore	CINEOS	EOS	2.6 km	MPC · JPL
541138	2007 NF_{3}	—	September 14, 2002	Palomar	Matson, R. D.	EOS	2.2 km	MPC · JPL
541139	2008 FP_{74}	—	August 5, 2005	Palomar	NEAT	·	2.5 km	MPC · JPL
541140	2013 EA_{91}	—	October 20, 2003	Kitt Peak	Spacewatch	·	1.6 km	MPC · JPL
541141	2013 FP_{2}	—	September 1, 2002	Palomar	NEAT	·	1.7 km	MPC · JPL
541142	2013 GZ_{83}	—	April 15, 2013	Elena Remote	Oreshko, A.	·	1.9 km	MPC · JPL
541143	2013 HQ_{16}	—	January 30, 2004	Kitt Peak	Spacewatch	·	2.1 km	MPC · JPL
541144	2013 HY_{145}	—	March 18, 2002	Kitt Peak	Deep Ecliptic Survey	·	1.7 km	MPC · JPL
541145	2013 LT_{3}	—	April 5, 2008	Črni Vrh	Mikuž, H.	·	3.0 km	MPC · JPL
541146	2013 PG_{36}	—	September 19, 2003	Kitt Peak	Spacewatch	EOS	2.5 km	MPC · JPL
541147	2014 FE_{52}	—	January 27, 2003	Palomar	NEAT	·	1.1 km	MPC · JPL
541148	2014 OX_{404}	—	January 26, 2007	Kitt Peak	Spacewatch	·	2.1 km	MPC · JPL
541149	2014 QS_{437}	—	August 22, 2003	Palomar	NEAT	·	2.5 km	MPC · JPL
541150	2015 TL_{157}	—	May 19, 2002	Palomar	NEAT	·	1.3 km	MPC · JPL
541151	2017 DO_{31}	—	January 5, 2006	Mount Lemmon	Mount Lemmon Survey	EOS	2.3 km	MPC · JPL
541152	2017 EU_{9}	—	October 24, 2005	Mauna Kea	A. Boattini	·	2.7 km	MPC · JPL
541153	2017 FW_{30}	—	October 19, 2006	Mount Lemmon	Mount Lemmon Survey	·	1.7 km	MPC · JPL
541154	2017 FK_{41}	—	August 30, 2005	Kitt Peak	Spacewatch	·	2.3 km	MPC · JPL
541155	2017 FG_{53}	—	July 28, 2006	Siding Spring	SSS	·	2.0 km	MPC · JPL
541156	2011 AG_{2}	—	March 10, 2007	Kitt Peak	Spacewatch	AGN	1.2 km	MPC · JPL
541157	2011 AT_{2}	—	August 15, 2009	Catalina	CSS	·	1.8 km	MPC · JPL
541158	2011 AJ_{19}	—	January 8, 2011	Kitt Peak	Spacewatch	·	1.8 km	MPC · JPL
541159	2011 AH_{27}	—	December 8, 2010	Catalina	CSS	·	2.6 km	MPC · JPL
541160	2011 AG_{34}	—	March 13, 2007	Mount Lemmon	Mount Lemmon Survey	·	2.1 km	MPC · JPL
541161	2011 AN_{38}	—	December 14, 2010	Mount Lemmon	Mount Lemmon Survey	·	1.6 km	MPC · JPL
541162	2011 AC_{40}	—	December 8, 2010	Mount Lemmon	Mount Lemmon Survey	TIR	3.5 km	MPC · JPL
541163	2011 AD_{40}	—	November 15, 2010	Mount Lemmon	Mount Lemmon Survey	(18466)	2.0 km	MPC · JPL
541164	2011 AR_{49}	—	January 13, 2011	Mount Lemmon	Mount Lemmon Survey	615	900 m	MPC · JPL
541165	2011 AT_{52}	—	December 9, 2010	Mount Lemmon	Mount Lemmon Survey	BRA	1.3 km	MPC · JPL
541166	2011 AJ_{62}	—	January 13, 2011	Mount Lemmon	Mount Lemmon Survey	·	1.8 km	MPC · JPL
541167	2011 AX_{63}	—	January 3, 2011	Mount Lemmon	Mount Lemmon Survey	·	960 m	MPC · JPL
541168	2011 AN_{69}	—	February 21, 2007	Mount Lemmon	Mount Lemmon Survey	·	2.0 km	MPC · JPL
541169	2011 AF_{72}	—	December 13, 2010	Mount Lemmon	Mount Lemmon Survey	·	2.6 km	MPC · JPL
541170	2011 AJ_{77}	—	January 5, 2002	Anderson Mesa	LONEOS	GAL	1.6 km	MPC · JPL
541171	2011 AP_{79}	—	January 13, 2011	Palomar	Palomar Transient Factory	·	2.0 km	MPC · JPL
541172	2011 AV_{81}	—	September 30, 2003	Kitt Peak	Spacewatch	·	3.2 km	MPC · JPL
541173	2011 AZ_{81}	—	January 3, 2011	Mount Lemmon	Mount Lemmon Survey	·	1.5 km	MPC · JPL
541174	2011 AE_{83}	—	January 14, 2011	Kitt Peak	Spacewatch	KOR	1.1 km	MPC · JPL
541175	2011 AU_{83}	—	January 10, 2011	Mount Lemmon	Mount Lemmon Survey	·	710 m	MPC · JPL
541176	2011 BQ_{2}	—	November 30, 2005	Kitt Peak	Spacewatch	·	2.1 km	MPC · JPL
541177	2011 BQ_{4}	—	September 20, 2003	Palomar	NEAT	·	3.4 km	MPC · JPL
541178	2011 BJ_{6}	—	January 16, 2011	Mount Lemmon	Mount Lemmon Survey	·	1.6 km	MPC · JPL
541179	2011 BT_{6}	—	January 16, 2011	Mount Lemmon	Mount Lemmon Survey	KOR	1.1 km	MPC · JPL
541180	2011 BO_{15}	—	March 10, 2005	Mount Lemmon	Mount Lemmon Survey	·	640 m	MPC · JPL
541181	2011 BZ_{21}	—	January 23, 2011	Mount Lemmon	Mount Lemmon Survey	·	1.8 km	MPC · JPL
541182	2011 BD_{35}	—	January 28, 2011	Mount Lemmon	Mount Lemmon Survey	·	1.6 km	MPC · JPL
541183	2011 BN_{38}	—	February 2, 2005	Kitt Peak	Spacewatch	·	3.8 km	MPC · JPL
541184 Babjak	2011 BN_{44}	Babjak	January 30, 2011	Piszkés-tető	S. Kürti, K. Sárneczky	·	670 m	MPC · JPL
541185 Boldogkői	2011 BO_{44}	Boldogkői	January 30, 2011	Piszkéstető	K. Sárneczky, Z. Kuli	EOS	1.5 km	MPC · JPL
541186	2011 BW_{48}	—	January 31, 2011	Piszkés-tető	K. Sárneczky, Z. Kuli	·	2.3 km	MPC · JPL
541187	2011 BL_{49}	—	January 31, 2011	Piszkés-tető	K. Sárneczky, Z. Kuli	EOS	2.1 km	MPC · JPL
541188	2011 BE_{54}	—	December 22, 2005	Kitt Peak	Spacewatch	KOR	1.3 km	MPC · JPL
541189	2011 BQ_{68}	—	September 25, 2009	Kitt Peak	Spacewatch	KOR	1.2 km	MPC · JPL
541190	2011 BP_{70}	—	March 14, 2011	Mount Lemmon	Mount Lemmon Survey	·	1.9 km	MPC · JPL
541191	2011 BK_{71}	—	October 18, 2009	Mount Lemmon	Mount Lemmon Survey	·	1.6 km	MPC · JPL
541192	2011 BJ_{78}	—	October 22, 2006	Kitt Peak	Spacewatch	·	1.5 km	MPC · JPL
541193	2011 BA_{84}	—	March 5, 1997	Kitt Peak	Spacewatch	·	830 m	MPC · JPL
541194	2011 BG_{91}	—	August 20, 2008	Kitt Peak	Spacewatch	·	2.8 km	MPC · JPL
541195	2011 BS_{93}	—	March 5, 2006	Kitt Peak	Spacewatch	·	2.0 km	MPC · JPL
541196	2011 BY_{93}	—	September 18, 2009	Kitt Peak	Spacewatch	·	720 m	MPC · JPL
541197	2011 BG_{95}	—	October 30, 2005	Mount Lemmon	Mount Lemmon Survey	KOR	1.4 km	MPC · JPL
541198	2011 BW_{104}	—	January 28, 2011	Mount Lemmon	Mount Lemmon Survey	·	1.6 km	MPC · JPL
541199	2011 BX_{105}	—	September 21, 2003	Palomar	NEAT	EOS	2.1 km	MPC · JPL
541200 Komjádibéla	2011 BJ_{107}	Komjádibéla	August 24, 2008	Piszkéstető	K. Sárneczky	EOS	1.4 km	MPC · JPL

== 541201–541300 ==
back to top

Designation			Discovery			Properties		Ref
Permanent	Provisional	Named after	Date	Site	Discoverer(s)	Category	Diam.	Ref
541201	2011 BW_{118}	—	September 26, 2009	Kitt Peak	Spacewatch	·	1.9 km	MPC · JPL
541202	2011 BT_{126}	—	October 28, 2005	Mount Lemmon	Mount Lemmon Survey	·	2.5 km	MPC · JPL
541203	2011 BU_{126}	—	July 29, 2008	Mount Lemmon	Mount Lemmon Survey	·	2.3 km	MPC · JPL
541204	2011 BY_{126}	—	June 10, 2007	Kitt Peak	Spacewatch	·	2.7 km	MPC · JPL
541205	2011 BE_{138}	—	January 8, 2011	Mount Lemmon	Mount Lemmon Survey	·	1.6 km	MPC · JPL
541206	2011 BY_{138}	—	January 29, 2011	Mount Lemmon	Mount Lemmon Survey	·	1.8 km	MPC · JPL
541207	2011 BN_{141}	—	January 8, 2011	Mount Lemmon	Mount Lemmon Survey	·	790 m	MPC · JPL
541208	2011 BV_{144}	—	January 29, 2011	Mount Lemmon	Mount Lemmon Survey	·	1.5 km	MPC · JPL
541209	2011 BB_{146}	—	September 17, 2009	Kitt Peak	Spacewatch	·	1.6 km	MPC · JPL
541210	2011 BL_{148}	—	April 30, 2005	Kitt Peak	Spacewatch	·	600 m	MPC · JPL
541211	2011 BM_{149}	—	January 29, 2011	Mount Lemmon	Mount Lemmon Survey	·	3.4 km	MPC · JPL
541212	2011 BU_{152}	—	October 8, 2010	Catalina	CSS	·	1.6 km	MPC · JPL
541213	2011 BO_{157}	—	April 22, 2007	Mount Lemmon	Mount Lemmon Survey	·	1.7 km	MPC · JPL
541214	2011 BX_{159}	—	January 29, 2011	Mount Lemmon	Mount Lemmon Survey	·	1.6 km	MPC · JPL
541215	2011 BY_{164}	—	October 9, 2008	Mount Lemmon	Mount Lemmon Survey	·	1.9 km	MPC · JPL
541216	2011 BP_{165}	—	March 6, 2011	Mount Lemmon	Mount Lemmon Survey	EOS	1.4 km	MPC · JPL
541217	2011 BG_{168}	—	February 26, 2011	Mount Lemmon	Mount Lemmon Survey	·	2.6 km	MPC · JPL
541218	2011 BV_{169}	—	January 25, 2011	Mount Lemmon	Mount Lemmon Survey	·	2.3 km	MPC · JPL
541219	2011 BE_{170}	—	October 25, 2009	Kitt Peak	Spacewatch	HOF	2.3 km	MPC · JPL
541220	2011 CT	—	February 2, 2011	Piszkés-tető	K. Sárneczky, Z. Kuli	·	1.9 km	MPC · JPL
541221	2011 CA_{5}	—	January 27, 2011	Mount Lemmon	Mount Lemmon Survey	·	2.1 km	MPC · JPL
541222 Ianbaker	2011 CB_{17}	Ianbaker	December 2, 2005	Kitt Peak	Wasserman, L. H., Millis, R. L.	EOS	2.1 km	MPC · JPL
541223	2011 CL_{23}	—	September 29, 2009	Mount Lemmon	Mount Lemmon Survey	·	1.9 km	MPC · JPL
541224	2011 CR_{23}	—	January 25, 2011	Mount Lemmon	Mount Lemmon Survey	EOS	1.7 km	MPC · JPL
541225	2011 CQ_{41}	—	January 29, 2006	Bergisch Gladbach	W. Bickel	·	1.7 km	MPC · JPL
541226	2011 CF_{46}	—	January 28, 2011	Mount Lemmon	Mount Lemmon Survey	·	1.6 km	MPC · JPL
541227	2011 CN_{48}	—	February 5, 2011	Catalina	CSS	·	1.7 km	MPC · JPL
541228	2011 CL_{60}	—	February 8, 2011	Mount Lemmon	Mount Lemmon Survey	·	1.4 km	MPC · JPL
541229	2011 CR_{63}	—	February 10, 2011	Mount Lemmon	Mount Lemmon Survey	·	610 m	MPC · JPL
541230	2011 CZ_{63}	—	November 1, 2005	Mount Lemmon	Mount Lemmon Survey	·	960 m	MPC · JPL
541231	2011 CW_{65}	—	January 28, 2011	Kitt Peak	Spacewatch	·	2.1 km	MPC · JPL
541232	2011 CE_{69}	—	December 13, 2010	Mount Lemmon	Mount Lemmon Survey	·	2.1 km	MPC · JPL
541233	2011 CK_{69}	—	January 12, 2011	Mount Lemmon	Mount Lemmon Survey	EOS	1.5 km	MPC · JPL
541234	2011 CM_{78}	—	February 10, 2011	Mount Lemmon	Mount Lemmon Survey	·	1.0 km	MPC · JPL
541235	2011 CB_{83}	—	September 21, 2003	Kitt Peak	Spacewatch	EOS	1.5 km	MPC · JPL
541236	2011 CG_{83}	—	September 26, 2006	Kitt Peak	Spacewatch	·	570 m	MPC · JPL
541237	2011 CP_{90}	—	February 12, 2011	Mount Lemmon	Mount Lemmon Survey	·	3.3 km	MPC · JPL
541238	2011 CF_{93}	—	February 11, 2011	Mount Lemmon	Mount Lemmon Survey	·	1.9 km	MPC · JPL
541239	2011 CS_{95}	—	February 2, 2006	Kitt Peak	Spacewatch	·	1.7 km	MPC · JPL
541240	2011 CE_{96}	—	October 14, 2009	Mount Lemmon	Mount Lemmon Survey	·	1.8 km	MPC · JPL
541241	2011 CB_{98}	—	February 5, 2011	Haleakala	Pan-STARRS 1	·	1.7 km	MPC · JPL
541242	2011 CC_{110}	—	September 16, 2003	Kitt Peak	Spacewatch	EOS	1.6 km	MPC · JPL
541243	2011 CV_{112}	—	February 5, 2011	Haleakala	Pan-STARRS 1	·	1.8 km	MPC · JPL
541244	2011 CC_{113}	—	March 6, 2011	Mount Lemmon	Mount Lemmon Survey	·	1.5 km	MPC · JPL
541245	2011 CS_{114}	—	March 2, 2011	Mount Lemmon	Mount Lemmon Survey	·	1.7 km	MPC · JPL
541246	2011 CF_{116}	—	February 1, 2006	Mount Lemmon	Mount Lemmon Survey	·	2.0 km	MPC · JPL
541247	2011 CK_{116}	—	September 18, 2009	Mount Lemmon	Mount Lemmon Survey	KOR	1.3 km	MPC · JPL
541248	2011 CN_{117}	—	February 6, 2007	Palomar	NEAT	V	1.1 km	MPC · JPL
541249	2011 CF_{120}	—	February 27, 2006	Mount Lemmon	Mount Lemmon Survey	·	1.5 km	MPC · JPL
541250	2011 CR_{120}	—	March 29, 2007	Kitt Peak	Spacewatch	·	1.8 km	MPC · JPL
541251	2011 DG_{6}	—	January 11, 2011	Mount Lemmon	Mount Lemmon Survey	·	2.0 km	MPC · JPL
541252	2011 DE_{13}	—	January 30, 2011	Piszkés-tető	K. Sárneczky, Z. Kuli	·	1.8 km	MPC · JPL
541253	2011 DV_{13}	—	January 26, 2011	Kitt Peak	Spacewatch	·	1.1 km	MPC · JPL
541254	2011 DJ_{15}	—	February 25, 2011	Mount Lemmon	Mount Lemmon Survey	·	2.2 km	MPC · JPL
541255	2011 DO_{15}	—	September 21, 2009	Kitt Peak	Spacewatch	AGN	900 m	MPC · JPL
541256	2011 DF_{20}	—	September 28, 2003	Anderson Mesa	LONEOS	·	3.3 km	MPC · JPL
541257	2011 DU_{20}	—	February 25, 2011	Mount Lemmon	Mount Lemmon Survey	·	610 m	MPC · JPL
541258	2011 DN_{30}	—	October 22, 2003	Kitt Peak	Spacewatch	·	3.6 km	MPC · JPL
541259	2011 DC_{32}	—	February 25, 2011	Mount Lemmon	Mount Lemmon Survey	KOR	1.3 km	MPC · JPL
541260	2011 DA_{37}	—	February 25, 2011	Mount Lemmon	Mount Lemmon Survey	·	2.1 km	MPC · JPL
541261	2011 DT_{39}	—	February 25, 2011	Mount Lemmon	Mount Lemmon Survey	EOS	1.6 km	MPC · JPL
541262	2011 DQ_{40}	—	February 25, 2011	Mount Lemmon	Mount Lemmon Survey	·	2.3 km	MPC · JPL
541263	2011 DC_{46}	—	February 26, 2011	Mount Lemmon	Mount Lemmon Survey	·	2.8 km	MPC · JPL
541264	2011 EK_{3}	—	February 10, 2011	Mount Lemmon	Mount Lemmon Survey	·	2.9 km	MPC · JPL
541265	2011 EG_{4}	—	January 15, 2005	Kitt Peak	Spacewatch	·	2.1 km	MPC · JPL
541266	2011 EX_{16}	—	January 14, 2011	Kitt Peak	Spacewatch	·	1.8 km	MPC · JPL
541267	2011 EP_{20}	—	May 18, 2005	Palomar	NEAT	·	720 m	MPC · JPL
541268	2011 EX_{20}	—	March 7, 2011	Wildberg	R. Apitzsch	·	3.1 km	MPC · JPL
541269	2011 EN_{29}	—	April 14, 2007	Kitt Peak	Spacewatch	·	1.9 km	MPC · JPL
541270	2011 EE_{31}	—	February 26, 2011	Catalina	CSS	·	1.7 km	MPC · JPL
541271	2011 ES_{33}	—	February 23, 2011	Kitt Peak	Spacewatch	EOS	1.4 km	MPC · JPL
541272	2011 EB_{36}	—	September 6, 2008	Mount Lemmon	Mount Lemmon Survey	EOS	1.5 km	MPC · JPL
541273	2011 EU_{38}	—	February 27, 2006	Kitt Peak	Spacewatch	·	2.1 km	MPC · JPL
541274	2011 EX_{38}	—	March 6, 2011	Kitt Peak	Spacewatch	·	2.6 km	MPC · JPL
541275	2011 EF_{39}	—	March 6, 2011	Kitt Peak	Spacewatch	·	1.7 km	MPC · JPL
541276	2011 ES_{40}	—	March 9, 2011	Flagstaff	Hobart, J.	EOS	1.6 km	MPC · JPL
541277	2011 EX_{43}	—	November 21, 2009	Kitt Peak	Spacewatch	·	1.5 km	MPC · JPL
541278	2011 EK_{52}	—	November 20, 2009	Kitt Peak	Spacewatch	·	2.3 km	MPC · JPL
541279	2011 EO_{53}	—	November 1, 2008	Mount Lemmon	Mount Lemmon Survey	VER	3.4 km	MPC · JPL
541280	2011 EG_{54}	—	August 24, 2003	Cerro Tololo	Deep Ecliptic Survey	·	2.2 km	MPC · JPL
541281	2011 ES_{57}	—	March 11, 2011	Mayhill	L. Elenin	DOR	1.9 km	MPC · JPL
541282	2011 EW_{59}	—	October 6, 2004	Kitt Peak	Spacewatch	·	1.9 km	MPC · JPL
541283	2011 EZ_{60}	—	March 12, 2011	Mount Lemmon	Mount Lemmon Survey	·	2.1 km	MPC · JPL
541284	2011 ED_{64}	—	October 29, 2006	Kitt Peak	Spacewatch	·	560 m	MPC · JPL
541285	2011 ES_{72}	—	February 26, 2004	Kitt Peak	Deep Ecliptic Survey	·	590 m	MPC · JPL
541286	2011 EC_{79}	—	October 25, 2009	Mount Lemmon	Mount Lemmon Survey	BRA	1.6 km	MPC · JPL
541287	2011 EQ_{81}	—	September 24, 2008	Mount Lemmon	Mount Lemmon Survey	EOS	2.1 km	MPC · JPL
541288 Rogerhaynes	2011 ET_{81}	Rogerhaynes	December 2, 2005	Kitt Peak	Wasserman, L. H., Millis, R. L.	·	1.9 km	MPC · JPL
541289	2011 EE_{82}	—	March 26, 2006	Kitt Peak	Spacewatch	·	2.5 km	MPC · JPL
541290	2011 ER_{82}	—	September 24, 2008	Kitt Peak	Spacewatch	·	2.0 km	MPC · JPL
541291	2011 ED_{89}	—	March 1, 2011	Mount Lemmon	Mount Lemmon Survey	·	1.9 km	MPC · JPL
541292	2011 FL_{1}	—	March 24, 2011	Nogales	Robbins, I.	·	2.5 km	MPC · JPL
541293	2011 FL_{3}	—	March 24, 2011	Kitt Peak	Spacewatch	·	2.0 km	MPC · JPL
541294	2011 FK_{6}	—	March 26, 2011	Kitt Peak	Spacewatch	EOS	1.8 km	MPC · JPL
541295	2011 FD_{9}	—	March 27, 2011	Mount Lemmon	Mount Lemmon Survey	·	790 m	MPC · JPL
541296	2011 FA_{13}	—	March 26, 2011	Mount Lemmon	Mount Lemmon Survey	·	2.8 km	MPC · JPL
541297	2011 FD_{14}	—	October 26, 2009	Mount Lemmon	Mount Lemmon Survey	·	720 m	MPC · JPL
541298	2011 FL_{14}	—	September 1, 2008	Andrushivka	Y. Ivaščenko, P. Ostafijchuk	·	1.0 km	MPC · JPL
541299	2011 FX_{18}	—	October 31, 2008	Kitt Peak	Spacewatch	·	2.8 km	MPC · JPL
541300	2011 FU_{20}	—	December 19, 2004	Kitt Peak	Spacewatch	·	1.7 km	MPC · JPL

== 541301–541400 ==
back to top

Designation			Discovery			Properties		Ref
Permanent	Provisional	Named after	Date	Site	Discoverer(s)	Category	Diam.	Ref
541301	2011 FZ_{21}	—	March 26, 2011	Mount Lemmon	Mount Lemmon Survey	·	2.1 km	MPC · JPL
541302	2011 FS_{22}	—	October 17, 2008	Kitt Peak	Spacewatch	·	2.3 km	MPC · JPL
541303	2011 FY_{24}	—	March 29, 2011	Piszkés-tető	K. Sárneczky, Z. Kuli	·	3.0 km	MPC · JPL
541304	2011 FG_{25}	—	March 29, 2011	Piszkés-tető	K. Sárneczky, Z. Kuli	LIX	3.2 km	MPC · JPL
541305	2011 FN_{26}	—	March 30, 2011	Piszkés-tető	K. Sárneczky, Z. Kuli	·	3.4 km	MPC · JPL
541306	2011 FC_{28}	—	March 5, 2006	Anderson Mesa	LONEOS	·	3.5 km	MPC · JPL
541307	2011 FJ_{30}	—	September 18, 2003	Kitt Peak	Spacewatch	·	2.1 km	MPC · JPL
541308	2011 FE_{38}	—	April 10, 2005	Kitt Peak	Deep Ecliptic Survey	·	2.9 km	MPC · JPL
541309	2011 FS_{38}	—	April 30, 2006	Kitt Peak	Spacewatch	·	2.6 km	MPC · JPL
541310	2011 FK_{42}	—	November 26, 2003	Kitt Peak	Spacewatch	·	3.2 km	MPC · JPL
541311	2011 FC_{43}	—	December 18, 2004	Mount Lemmon	Mount Lemmon Survey	EOS	2.4 km	MPC · JPL
541312	2011 FU_{46}	—	May 22, 2001	Cerro Tololo	Deep Ecliptic Survey	·	540 m	MPC · JPL
541313	2011 FT_{48}	—	March 29, 2011	Kitt Peak	Spacewatch	·	2.1 km	MPC · JPL
541314	2011 FD_{49}	—	March 30, 2011	Mount Lemmon	Mount Lemmon Survey	·	2.8 km	MPC · JPL
541315	2011 FP_{52}	—	March 28, 2011	Kitt Peak	Spacewatch	·	1.1 km	MPC · JPL
541316	2011 FW_{54}	—	May 31, 2001	Kitt Peak	Spacewatch	EMA	2.8 km	MPC · JPL
541317	2011 FB_{55}	—	October 4, 1996	Kitt Peak	Spacewatch	·	700 m	MPC · JPL
541318 Mirasteilas	2011 FD_{61}	Mirasteilas	March 29, 2011	Falera	J. De Queiroz	·	2.2 km	MPC · JPL
541319	2011 FS_{61}	—	February 25, 2011	Mount Lemmon	Mount Lemmon Survey	·	2.0 km	MPC · JPL
541320	2011 FV_{61}	—	September 30, 2003	Kitt Peak	Spacewatch	·	1.6 km	MPC · JPL
541321	2011 FH_{72}	—	March 31, 2011	Mount Lemmon	Mount Lemmon Survey	KON	2.5 km	MPC · JPL
541322	2011 FY_{72}	—	March 27, 2011	Mount Lemmon	Mount Lemmon Survey	·	2.1 km	MPC · JPL
541323	2011 FJ_{73}	—	November 16, 2009	Mount Lemmon	Mount Lemmon Survey	AGN	1.0 km	MPC · JPL
541324	2011 FR_{74}	—	March 1, 2011	Mount Lemmon	Mount Lemmon Survey	·	1.9 km	MPC · JPL
541325	2011 FC_{75}	—	March 29, 2011	Mount Lemmon	Mount Lemmon Survey	·	3.4 km	MPC · JPL
541326	2011 FR_{75}	—	September 20, 2008	Mount Lemmon	Mount Lemmon Survey	·	1.7 km	MPC · JPL
541327	2011 FW_{78}	—	March 11, 2011	Catalina	CSS	·	2.7 km	MPC · JPL
541328	2011 FS_{79}	—	March 27, 2011	Mount Lemmon	Mount Lemmon Survey	·	3.4 km	MPC · JPL
541329	2011 FF_{83}	—	March 30, 2011	Mount Lemmon	Mount Lemmon Survey	·	2.2 km	MPC · JPL
541330	2011 FW_{84}	—	November 21, 2009	Mount Lemmon	Mount Lemmon Survey	VER	3.3 km	MPC · JPL
541331	2011 FB_{86}	—	October 22, 2003	Kitt Peak	Spacewatch	·	2.5 km	MPC · JPL
541332	2011 FE_{89}	—	November 23, 2009	Kitt Peak	Spacewatch	EOS	1.8 km	MPC · JPL
541333	2011 FF_{90}	—	December 28, 2005	Kitt Peak	Spacewatch	·	1.9 km	MPC · JPL
541334	2011 FF_{92}	—	February 23, 2011	Kitt Peak	Spacewatch	·	1.9 km	MPC · JPL
541335	2011 FT_{92}	—	March 28, 2011	Mount Lemmon	Mount Lemmon Survey	·	2.1 km	MPC · JPL
541336	2011 FY_{95}	—	October 8, 2008	Kitt Peak	Spacewatch	·	2.4 km	MPC · JPL
541337	2011 FL_{96}	—	August 24, 2008	Kitt Peak	Spacewatch	·	1.7 km	MPC · JPL
541338	2011 FA_{101}	—	March 30, 2011	Mount Lemmon	Mount Lemmon Survey	·	1.9 km	MPC · JPL
541339	2011 FZ_{104}	—	September 4, 2007	Catalina	CSS	·	3.2 km	MPC · JPL
541340	2011 FA_{106}	—	July 30, 2008	Mount Lemmon	Mount Lemmon Survey	·	2.5 km	MPC · JPL
541341	2011 FH_{107}	—	April 5, 2011	Mount Lemmon	Mount Lemmon Survey	·	2.4 km	MPC · JPL
541342	2011 FL_{107}	—	September 3, 2008	Kitt Peak	Spacewatch	·	1.8 km	MPC · JPL
541343	2011 FY_{107}	—	April 5, 2011	Mount Lemmon	Mount Lemmon Survey	·	2.5 km	MPC · JPL
541344	2011 FQ_{108}	—	September 23, 2008	Kitt Peak	Spacewatch	·	2.2 km	MPC · JPL
541345	2011 FS_{108}	—	March 2, 2011	Mount Lemmon	Mount Lemmon Survey	·	2.6 km	MPC · JPL
541346	2011 FU_{111}	—	November 2, 2008	Mount Lemmon	Mount Lemmon Survey	·	2.4 km	MPC · JPL
541347	2011 FH_{113}	—	July 29, 2008	Kitt Peak	Spacewatch	·	2.1 km	MPC · JPL
541348	2011 FB_{116}	—	September 4, 2007	Catalina	CSS	·	3.2 km	MPC · JPL
541349	2011 FC_{117}	—	April 2, 2011	Mount Lemmon	Mount Lemmon Survey	V	600 m	MPC · JPL
541350	2011 FA_{123}	—	August 24, 2007	Kitt Peak	Spacewatch	·	2.9 km	MPC · JPL
541351	2011 FD_{128}	—	April 12, 2002	Palomar	NEAT	·	2.1 km	MPC · JPL
541352	2011 FN_{128}	—	March 11, 2011	Catalina	CSS	·	2.1 km	MPC · JPL
541353	2011 FY_{139}	—	April 5, 2011	Mount Lemmon	Mount Lemmon Survey	·	3.0 km	MPC · JPL
541354	2011 FM_{140}	—	April 5, 2011	Mount Lemmon	Mount Lemmon Survey	EOS	1.5 km	MPC · JPL
541355	2011 FU_{146}	—	December 12, 2004	Kitt Peak	Spacewatch	·	2.4 km	MPC · JPL
541356	2011 FW_{146}	—	September 5, 2008	Kitt Peak	Spacewatch	·	2.2 km	MPC · JPL
541357	2011 FE_{147}	—	November 26, 2009	Kitt Peak	Spacewatch	·	2.5 km	MPC · JPL
541358	2011 FE_{153}	—	April 1, 2011	Kitt Peak	Spacewatch	·	1.7 km	MPC · JPL
541359	2011 FJ_{155}	—	March 24, 2011	Catalina	CSS	·	1.8 km	MPC · JPL
541360	2011 FA_{156}	—	March 9, 2011	Mount Lemmon	Mount Lemmon Survey	·	660 m	MPC · JPL
541361	2011 FR_{158}	—	March 6, 2011	Mount Lemmon	Mount Lemmon Survey	EOS	1.6 km	MPC · JPL
541362	2011 FN_{159}	—	May 8, 2006	Mount Lemmon	Mount Lemmon Survey	·	2.8 km	MPC · JPL
541363	2011 GR_{1}	—	March 11, 2011	Mount Lemmon	Mount Lemmon Survey	·	1.8 km	MPC · JPL
541364	2011 GS_{1}	—	April 1, 2011	Mount Lemmon	Mount Lemmon Survey	EOS	1.4 km	MPC · JPL
541365	2011 GM_{2}	—	September 2, 2008	Kitt Peak	Spacewatch	·	3.1 km	MPC · JPL
541366	2011 GP_{5}	—	April 2, 2011	Mount Lemmon	Mount Lemmon Survey	EOS	1.6 km	MPC · JPL
541367	2011 GA_{8}	—	November 8, 2008	Kitt Peak	Spacewatch	·	3.3 km	MPC · JPL
541368	2011 GF_{8}	—	April 2, 2011	Mount Lemmon	Mount Lemmon Survey	·	3.2 km	MPC · JPL
541369	2011 GN_{8}	—	April 2, 2011	Mount Lemmon	Mount Lemmon Survey	EOS	2.1 km	MPC · JPL
541370	2011 GS_{8}	—	April 2, 2011	Mount Lemmon	Mount Lemmon Survey	·	2.3 km	MPC · JPL
541371	2011 GW_{8}	—	September 29, 2008	Catalina	CSS	·	2.8 km	MPC · JPL
541372	2011 GR_{15}	—	April 1, 2011	Mount Lemmon	Mount Lemmon Survey	·	2.1 km	MPC · JPL
541373	2011 GA_{16}	—	April 1, 2011	Mount Lemmon	Mount Lemmon Survey	·	450 m	MPC · JPL
541374	2011 GK_{16}	—	March 16, 2005	Mount Lemmon	Mount Lemmon Survey	EOS	2.1 km	MPC · JPL
541375	2011 GF_{19}	—	April 2, 2011	Mount Lemmon	Mount Lemmon Survey	EOS	1.6 km	MPC · JPL
541376	2011 GM_{21}	—	February 2, 2005	Kitt Peak	Spacewatch	EOS	1.6 km	MPC · JPL
541377	2011 GL_{22}	—	November 27, 2009	Mount Lemmon	Mount Lemmon Survey	·	2.2 km	MPC · JPL
541378	2011 GW_{24}	—	March 11, 2005	Mount Lemmon	Mount Lemmon Survey	·	2.9 km	MPC · JPL
541379	2011 GN_{25}	—	April 4, 2011	Mount Lemmon	Mount Lemmon Survey	·	2.7 km	MPC · JPL
541380	2011 GH_{29}	—	October 24, 2003	Kitt Peak	Spacewatch	EOS	1.4 km	MPC · JPL
541381	2011 GM_{29}	—	September 28, 2008	Mount Lemmon	Mount Lemmon Survey	·	1.9 km	MPC · JPL
541382	2011 GV_{31}	—	April 1, 2011	Kitt Peak	Spacewatch	·	760 m	MPC · JPL
541383	2011 GH_{37}	—	May 7, 2008	Mount Lemmon	Mount Lemmon Survey	·	590 m	MPC · JPL
541384	2011 GV_{39}	—	February 4, 2005	Kitt Peak	Spacewatch	·	2.4 km	MPC · JPL
541385	2011 GD_{40}	—	August 21, 2007	Anderson Mesa	LONEOS	·	2.5 km	MPC · JPL
541386	2011 GJ_{41}	—	November 24, 2003	Kitt Peak	Spacewatch	·	3.6 km	MPC · JPL
541387	2011 GY_{43}	—	April 4, 2011	Mount Lemmon	Mount Lemmon Survey	·	2.4 km	MPC · JPL
541388	2011 GX_{54}	—	February 26, 2010	WISE	WISE	·	1.6 km	MPC · JPL
541389	2011 GX_{55}	—	April 26, 2007	Kitt Peak	Spacewatch	·	2.1 km	MPC · JPL
541390	2011 GZ_{57}	—	April 4, 2011	Kitt Peak	Spacewatch	·	2.8 km	MPC · JPL
541391	2011 GH_{60}	—	January 9, 2011	Mount Lemmon	Mount Lemmon Survey	TIR	2.7 km	MPC · JPL
541392	2011 GQ_{62}	—	April 2, 2011	Mount Lemmon	Mount Lemmon Survey	·	2.3 km	MPC · JPL
541393	2011 GU_{62}	—	April 3, 2011	Siding Spring	SSS	·	2.9 km	MPC · JPL
541394	2011 GQ_{64}	—	February 11, 2011	Catalina	CSS	·	3.0 km	MPC · JPL
541395	2011 GE_{66}	—	October 26, 2008	Kitt Peak	Spacewatch	·	3.2 km	MPC · JPL
541396	2011 GA_{75}	—	March 26, 2011	Mount Lemmon	Mount Lemmon Survey	·	440 m	MPC · JPL
541397	2011 GE_{77}	—	October 20, 2008	Kitt Peak	Spacewatch	EOS	1.8 km	MPC · JPL
541398	2011 GX_{80}	—	November 7, 2008	Mount Lemmon	Mount Lemmon Survey	·	3.1 km	MPC · JPL
541399	2011 GD_{81}	—	April 13, 2011	Haleakala	Pan-STARRS 1	·	3.4 km	MPC · JPL
541400	2011 GC_{82}	—	January 15, 2010	Kitt Peak	Spacewatch	·	3.0 km	MPC · JPL

== 541401–541500 ==
back to top

Designation			Discovery			Properties		Ref
Permanent	Provisional	Named after	Date	Site	Discoverer(s)	Category	Diam.	Ref
541401	2011 GD_{82}	—	December 28, 1998	Kitt Peak	Spacewatch	·	3.0 km	MPC · JPL
541402	2011 GG_{83}	—	August 10, 2007	Kitt Peak	Spacewatch	VER	2.6 km	MPC · JPL
541403	2011 GC_{91}	—	October 31, 2007	Catalina	CSS	·	4.2 km	MPC · JPL
541404	2011 HC_{3}	—	April 13, 2011	Mount Lemmon	Mount Lemmon Survey	·	2.9 km	MPC · JPL
541405	2011 HH_{14}	—	April 23, 2011	Haleakala	Pan-STARRS 1	·	3.2 km	MPC · JPL
541406	2011 HR_{16}	—	October 23, 2008	Kitt Peak	Spacewatch	EOS	1.7 km	MPC · JPL
541407	2011 HA_{19}	—	January 19, 2005	Kitt Peak	Spacewatch	·	2.7 km	MPC · JPL
541408	2011 HD_{19}	—	March 1, 2005	Kitt Peak	Spacewatch	·	3.2 km	MPC · JPL
541409	2011 HM_{20}	—	August 18, 2002	Palomar	NEAT	·	2.9 km	MPC · JPL
541410	2011 HJ_{32}	—	April 27, 2011	Kitt Peak	Spacewatch	·	3.4 km	MPC · JPL
541411	2011 HT_{37}	—	May 30, 2006	Mount Lemmon	Mount Lemmon Survey	·	2.8 km	MPC · JPL
541412	2011 HV_{37}	—	May 9, 2006	Mount Lemmon	Mount Lemmon Survey	EOS	2.2 km	MPC · JPL
541413	2011 HT_{40}	—	March 3, 2005	Kitt Peak	Spacewatch	·	2.4 km	MPC · JPL
541414	2011 HE_{41}	—	November 20, 2008	Kitt Peak	Spacewatch	·	3.6 km	MPC · JPL
541415	2011 HH_{42}	—	April 12, 2011	Mount Lemmon	Mount Lemmon Survey	·	3.6 km	MPC · JPL
541416	2011 HE_{45}	—	April 27, 2011	Haleakala	Pan-STARRS 1	·	3.1 km	MPC · JPL
541417	2011 HO_{45}	—	February 16, 2010	Mount Lemmon	Mount Lemmon Survey	·	2.5 km	MPC · JPL
541418	2011 HU_{45}	—	April 12, 2011	Mount Lemmon	Mount Lemmon Survey	BRA	1.3 km	MPC · JPL
541419	2011 HO_{46}	—	November 2, 2008	Mount Lemmon	Mount Lemmon Survey	·	2.7 km	MPC · JPL
541420	2011 HF_{48}	—	April 28, 2011	Haleakala	Pan-STARRS 1	·	3.2 km	MPC · JPL
541421	2011 HB_{49}	—	April 2, 2011	Kitt Peak	Spacewatch	·	1.9 km	MPC · JPL
541422	2011 HC_{49}	—	April 29, 2011	Kitt Peak	Spacewatch	·	2.7 km	MPC · JPL
541423	2011 HS_{49}	—	November 24, 2008	Kitt Peak	Spacewatch	·	3.2 km	MPC · JPL
541424	2011 HM_{50}	—	November 19, 2008	Kitt Peak	Spacewatch	VER	2.9 km	MPC · JPL
541425	2011 HF_{53}	—	October 13, 2007	Mount Lemmon	Mount Lemmon Survey	VER	3.0 km	MPC · JPL
541426	2011 HM_{53}	—	April 6, 2011	Mount Lemmon	Mount Lemmon Survey	·	2.9 km	MPC · JPL
541427	2011 HW_{54}	—	April 2, 2011	Kitt Peak	Spacewatch	·	2.9 km	MPC · JPL
541428	2011 HT_{56}	—	April 24, 2011	Kitt Peak	Spacewatch	·	2.4 km	MPC · JPL
541429	2011 HB_{58}	—	December 8, 2008	Mount Lemmon	Mount Lemmon Survey	EOS	2.4 km	MPC · JPL
541430	2011 HZ_{58}	—	September 10, 2002	Palomar	NEAT	·	3.3 km	MPC · JPL
541431	2011 HA_{60}	—	June 7, 2000	Kitt Peak	Spacewatch	·	3.8 km	MPC · JPL
541432	2011 HE_{63}	—	April 14, 2011	Mount Lemmon	Mount Lemmon Survey	·	2.6 km	MPC · JPL
541433	2011 HG_{76}	—	March 26, 2004	Kitt Peak	Spacewatch	·	840 m	MPC · JPL
541434	2011 HD_{79}	—	November 3, 2008	Mount Lemmon	Mount Lemmon Survey	VER	3.3 km	MPC · JPL
541435	2011 HJ_{80}	—	March 31, 2011	Mount Lemmon	Mount Lemmon Survey	·	3.7 km	MPC · JPL
541436	2011 HL_{80}	—	April 30, 2011	Haleakala	Pan-STARRS 1	·	3.0 km	MPC · JPL
541437	2011 HT_{85}	—	April 4, 2011	Kitt Peak	Spacewatch	·	630 m	MPC · JPL
541438	2011 HQ_{88}	—	April 28, 2011	Mount Lemmon	Mount Lemmon Survey	·	2.4 km	MPC · JPL
541439	2011 HB_{91}	—	July 27, 2005	Palomar	NEAT	V	760 m	MPC · JPL
541440	2011 HK_{91}	—	September 28, 2008	Mount Lemmon	Mount Lemmon Survey	·	2.4 km	MPC · JPL
541441	2011 HA_{97}	—	May 3, 2006	Mount Lemmon	Mount Lemmon Survey	·	1.8 km	MPC · JPL
541442	2011 HY_{102}	—	December 25, 2009	Kitt Peak	Spacewatch	·	3.9 km	MPC · JPL
541443	2011 JF_{2}	—	May 1, 2011	Épendes	P. Kocher	EOS	1.8 km	MPC · JPL
541444	2011 JD_{4}	—	May 1, 2011	Haleakala	Pan-STARRS 1	·	2.7 km	MPC · JPL
541445	2011 JN_{4}	—	May 1, 2011	Haleakala	Pan-STARRS 1	·	820 m	MPC · JPL
541446	2011 JD_{5}	—	December 21, 2003	Kitt Peak	Spacewatch	VER	2.8 km	MPC · JPL
541447	2011 JL_{5}	—	December 20, 2009	Kitt Peak	Spacewatch	TIR	3.6 km	MPC · JPL
541448	2011 JY_{5}	—	November 21, 2009	Mount Lemmon	Mount Lemmon Survey	·	3.3 km	MPC · JPL
541449	2011 JY_{8}	—	May 1, 2011	Haleakala	Pan-STARRS 1	·	2.9 km	MPC · JPL
541450	2011 JH_{9}	—	April 23, 2011	Haleakala	Pan-STARRS 1	·	2.1 km	MPC · JPL
541451	2011 JC_{12}	—	April 7, 2011	Kitt Peak	Spacewatch	·	730 m	MPC · JPL
541452	2011 JD_{14}	—	November 20, 2008	Mount Lemmon	Mount Lemmon Survey	·	3.0 km	MPC · JPL
541453	2011 JB_{16}	—	May 1, 2011	Mount Lemmon	Mount Lemmon Survey	VER	3.4 km	MPC · JPL
541454	2011 JT_{18}	—	January 8, 2010	Kitt Peak	Spacewatch	·	2.8 km	MPC · JPL
541455	2011 JE_{20}	—	September 7, 2008	Mount Lemmon	Mount Lemmon Survey	·	3.8 km	MPC · JPL
541456	2011 JK_{23}	—	May 16, 2010	WISE	WISE	·	2.7 km	MPC · JPL
541457	2011 JQ_{32}	—	May 3, 2011	Mount Lemmon	Mount Lemmon Survey	·	2.9 km	MPC · JPL
541458	2011 KF_{5}	—	November 8, 2008	Kitt Peak	Spacewatch	·	2.7 km	MPC · JPL
541459	2011 KH_{5}	—	May 8, 2011	Mount Lemmon	Mount Lemmon Survey	·	3.4 km	MPC · JPL
541460	2011 KM_{5}	—	October 2, 2008	Kitt Peak	Spacewatch	·	1.9 km	MPC · JPL
541461	2011 KA_{29}	—	October 29, 2005	Mount Lemmon	Mount Lemmon Survey	·	770 m	MPC · JPL
541462	2011 KV_{39}	—	October 7, 2008	Kitt Peak	Spacewatch	V	620 m	MPC · JPL
541463	2011 KY_{40}	—	May 24, 2011	Haleakala	Pan-STARRS 1	·	3.3 km	MPC · JPL
541464	2011 KX_{42}	—	May 3, 2011	Mount Lemmon	Mount Lemmon Survey	·	690 m	MPC · JPL
541465	2011 KJ_{43}	—	October 9, 2008	Kitt Peak	Spacewatch	·	2.5 km	MPC · JPL
541466	2011 KY_{43}	—	September 22, 2008	Kitt Peak	Spacewatch	NYS	970 m	MPC · JPL
541467	2011 KU_{44}	—	May 28, 2011	Kitt Peak	Spacewatch	·	840 m	MPC · JPL
541468	2011 KL_{46}	—	May 30, 2011	Haleakala	Pan-STARRS 1	·	2.1 km	MPC · JPL
541469	2011 LX	—	June 8, 2003	Kitt Peak	Spacewatch	·	960 m	MPC · JPL
541470	2011 LN_{1}	—	April 4, 2011	Kitt Peak	Spacewatch	·	2.1 km	MPC · JPL
541471	2011 LY_{9}	—	September 24, 2008	Mount Lemmon	Mount Lemmon Survey	·	1.4 km	MPC · JPL
541472	2011 LM_{14}	—	February 15, 2010	Mount Lemmon	Mount Lemmon Survey	·	2.4 km	MPC · JPL
541473	2011 LO_{14}	—	May 6, 2006	Mount Lemmon	Mount Lemmon Survey	H	320 m	MPC · JPL
541474	2011 LL_{15}	—	July 19, 2001	Palomar	NEAT	·	730 m	MPC · JPL
541475	2011 LO_{15}	—	October 16, 2007	Mount Lemmon	Mount Lemmon Survey	·	3.2 km	MPC · JPL
541476	2011 LG_{17}	—	June 8, 2011	Flagstaff	Hobart, J.	H	660 m	MPC · JPL
541477	2011 LK_{18}	—	June 6, 2011	Nogales	M. Schwartz, P. R. Holvorcem	H	630 m	MPC · JPL
541478	2011 LF_{24}	—	June 6, 2011	Haleakala	Pan-STARRS 1	EUP	3.3 km	MPC · JPL
541479	2011 LX_{24}	—	September 21, 2008	Kitt Peak	Spacewatch	·	760 m	MPC · JPL
541480	2011 LC_{26}	—	October 2, 2008	Kitt Peak	Spacewatch	·	680 m	MPC · JPL
541481	2011 LS_{27}	—	December 13, 2006	Mount Lemmon	Mount Lemmon Survey	·	810 m	MPC · JPL
541482	2011 LW_{27}	—	September 29, 1997	Kitt Peak	Spacewatch	EOS	2.0 km	MPC · JPL
541483	2011 MF_{11}	—	December 19, 2003	Kitt Peak	Spacewatch	·	3.5 km	MPC · JPL
541484	2011 ON_{2}	—	December 3, 2008	Kitt Peak	Spacewatch	·	870 m	MPC · JPL
541485	2011 OU_{2}	—	July 23, 2011	Haleakala	Pan-STARRS 1	·	1.2 km	MPC · JPL
541486	2011 OX_{11}	—	November 24, 2008	Mount Lemmon	Mount Lemmon Survey	·	940 m	MPC · JPL
541487 Silviapablo	2011 OG_{18}	Silviapablo	July 25, 2011	Observatorio Cielo	Gonzalez, J.	·	1.5 km	MPC · JPL
541488	2011 OC_{31}	—	July 28, 2011	Haleakala	Pan-STARRS 1	·	1.2 km	MPC · JPL
541489	2011 OM_{34}	—	December 6, 2008	Catalina	CSS	·	1.1 km	MPC · JPL
541490	2011 OD_{35}	—	June 22, 2011	Mount Lemmon	Mount Lemmon Survey	·	1.1 km	MPC · JPL
541491	2011 OF_{35}	—	June 22, 2011	Mount Lemmon	Mount Lemmon Survey	NYS	1.1 km	MPC · JPL
541492	2011 OS_{36}	—	August 1, 2011	Haleakala	Pan-STARRS 1	MAS	590 m	MPC · JPL
541493	2011 OQ_{39}	—	July 22, 2011	Haleakala	Pan-STARRS 1	·	1.1 km	MPC · JPL
541494	2011 OY_{41}	—	November 3, 2004	Kitt Peak	Spacewatch	NYS	910 m	MPC · JPL
541495	2011 OZ_{45}	—	April 26, 2007	Mount Lemmon	Mount Lemmon Survey	V	660 m	MPC · JPL
541496	2011 OO_{49}	—	May 28, 2011	Mount Lemmon	Mount Lemmon Survey	PHO	900 m	MPC · JPL
541497	2011 ON_{59}	—	May 31, 2011	Mount Lemmon	Mount Lemmon Survey	T_{j} (2.89)	5.0 km	MPC · JPL
541498	2011 OX_{60}	—	June 21, 2011	Kitt Peak	Spacewatch	·	1.4 km	MPC · JPL
541499	2011 PK_{5}	—	November 8, 2008	Kitt Peak	Spacewatch	·	1.2 km	MPC · JPL
541500	2011 PN_{13}	—	July 28, 2007	Mauna Kea	P. A. Wiegert, N. I. Hasan	·	980 m	MPC · JPL

== 541501–541600 ==
back to top

Designation			Discovery			Properties		Ref
Permanent	Provisional	Named after	Date	Site	Discoverer(s)	Category	Diam.	Ref
541501	2011 PQ_{16}	—	August 4, 2011	Haleakala	Pan-STARRS 1	MAS	800 m	MPC · JPL
541502	2011 QR_{5}	—	July 2, 2011	Kitt Peak	Spacewatch	·	1.3 km	MPC · JPL
541503	2011 QJ_{7}	—	July 28, 2011	Haleakala	Pan-STARRS 1	·	1.1 km	MPC · JPL
541504	2011 QF_{16}	—	January 7, 2002	Kitt Peak	Spacewatch	·	1.6 km	MPC · JPL
541505	2011 QA_{20}	—	January 23, 2006	Mount Lemmon	Mount Lemmon Survey	PHO	960 m	MPC · JPL
541506	2011 QQ_{36}	—	August 23, 2011	Haleakala	Pan-STARRS 1	·	1.0 km	MPC · JPL
541507	2011 QE_{37}	—	September 4, 2003	Kitt Peak	Spacewatch	T_{j} (2.94)	3.4 km	MPC · JPL
541508 Liucixin	2011 QK_{37}	Liucixin	August 27, 2011	Zelenchukskaya Stn	T. V. Krjačko, Satovski, B.	PHO	940 m	MPC · JPL
541509	2011 QT_{40}	—	August 24, 2011	Haleakala	Pan-STARRS 1	·	950 m	MPC · JPL
541510	2011 QL_{51}	—	August 31, 2011	Sierra Stars	R. Matson	NYS	1.0 km	MPC · JPL
541511	2011 QL_{52}	—	December 22, 2008	Kitt Peak	Spacewatch	·	960 m	MPC · JPL
541512	2011 QL_{53}	—	February 8, 1995	Kitt Peak	Spacewatch	·	1.3 km	MPC · JPL
541513	2011 QC_{69}	—	August 23, 2011	Haleakala	Pan-STARRS 1	·	1.1 km	MPC · JPL
541514	2011 QR_{70}	—	August 25, 2011	La Sagra	OAM	·	920 m	MPC · JPL
541515	2011 QA_{73}	—	August 22, 2011	La Sagra	OAM	·	980 m	MPC · JPL
541516	2011 QQ_{73}	—	October 26, 2008	Kitt Peak	Spacewatch	V	620 m	MPC · JPL
541517	2011 QR_{79}	—	August 23, 2011	Haleakala	Pan-STARRS 1	·	1.0 km	MPC · JPL
541518	2011 QR_{83}	—	August 24, 2011	Haleakala	Pan-STARRS 1	·	1.2 km	MPC · JPL
541519	2011 QH_{88}	—	August 27, 2011	Haleakala	Pan-STARRS 1	·	1.1 km	MPC · JPL
541520	2011 QO_{90}	—	February 4, 2006	Kitt Peak	Spacewatch	·	1.2 km	MPC · JPL
541521	2011 QY_{92}	—	August 30, 2011	Haleakala	Pan-STARRS 1	·	1.2 km	MPC · JPL
541522	2011 QD_{97}	—	August 28, 2011	Siding Spring	SSS	·	2.7 km	MPC · JPL
541523	2011 QE_{98}	—	August 29, 2011	Palomar	Palomar Transient Factory	T_{j} (2.95)	3.6 km	MPC · JPL
541524	2011 QY_{98}	—	October 5, 2011	Haleakala	Pan-STARRS 1	·	1.4 km	MPC · JPL
541525	2011 RM_{2}	—	September 2, 2011	Haleakala	Pan-STARRS 1	·	990 m	MPC · JPL
541526	2011 RY_{3}	—	September 4, 2011	Haleakala	Pan-STARRS 1	·	870 m	MPC · JPL
541527	2011 RP_{4}	—	April 27, 2006	Cerro Tololo	Deep Ecliptic Survey	T_{j} (2.98) · 3:2 · SHU	3.8 km	MPC · JPL
541528	2011 RO_{5}	—	January 9, 2006	Kitt Peak	Spacewatch	V	560 m	MPC · JPL
541529	2011 RM_{7}	—	October 24, 2005	Mauna Kea	A. Boattini	V	630 m	MPC · JPL
541530	2011 RS_{16}	—	September 5, 2011	Haleakala	Pan-STARRS 1	H	530 m	MPC · JPL
541531	2011 RD_{20}	—	September 4, 2011	Kitt Peak	Spacewatch	·	1 km	MPC · JPL
541532	2011 RR_{20}	—	September 2, 2011	Haleakala	Pan-STARRS 1	·	1.1 km	MPC · JPL
541533	2011 RO_{21}	—	September 4, 2011	Haleakala	Pan-STARRS 1	NYS	1.1 km	MPC · JPL
541534	2011 SR_{3}	—	September 18, 2011	Mount Lemmon	Mount Lemmon Survey	·	870 m	MPC · JPL
541535	2011 SD_{13}	—	September 20, 2003	Kitt Peak	Spacewatch	H	370 m	MPC · JPL
541536	2011 SE_{20}	—	October 21, 2003	Palomar	NEAT	·	890 m	MPC · JPL
541537	2011 ST_{20}	—	September 20, 2011	Haleakala	Pan-STARRS 1	·	1.0 km	MPC · JPL
541538	2011 SF_{21}	—	December 22, 2008	Kitt Peak	Spacewatch	·	1.3 km	MPC · JPL
541539	2011 ST_{23}	—	October 14, 2007	Kitt Peak	Spacewatch	·	890 m	MPC · JPL
541540	2011 SM_{34}	—	September 20, 2011	Kitt Peak	Spacewatch	·	1.1 km	MPC · JPL
541541	2011 SW_{36}	—	September 20, 2011	Kitt Peak	Spacewatch	3:2 · SHU	4.3 km	MPC · JPL
541542	2011 SL_{38}	—	December 31, 2008	Kitt Peak	Spacewatch	·	1.3 km	MPC · JPL
541543	2011 SU_{45}	—	September 2, 2011	Haleakala	Pan-STARRS 1	·	1.2 km	MPC · JPL
541544	2011 SW_{46}	—	September 2, 2011	Haleakala	Pan-STARRS 1	·	960 m	MPC · JPL
541545	2011 ST_{48}	—	September 11, 2007	Mount Lemmon	Mount Lemmon Survey	·	830 m	MPC · JPL
541546	2011 SA_{51}	—	December 19, 2004	Mount Lemmon	Mount Lemmon Survey	MAS	640 m	MPC · JPL
541547	2011 SS_{57}	—	October 20, 2003	Kitt Peak	Spacewatch	T_{j} (2.95)	2.9 km	MPC · JPL
541548	2011 SU_{64}	—	March 14, 2010	Kitt Peak	Spacewatch	H	620 m	MPC · JPL
541549	2011 ST_{66}	—	September 10, 2007	Mount Lemmon	Mount Lemmon Survey	·	970 m	MPC · JPL
541550 Schickbéla	2011 SR_{68}	Schickbéla	August 30, 2011	Piszkéstető	K. Sárneczky	H	430 m	MPC · JPL
541551	2011 SN_{70}	—	September 24, 2011	Drebach	G. Lehmann, ~Knöfel, A.	·	1.2 km	MPC · JPL
541552	2011 SG_{75}	—	September 19, 2011	La Sagra	OAM	H	460 m	MPC · JPL
541553	2011 SC_{94}	—	September 3, 2007	Pla D'Arguines	R. Ferrando, Ferrando, M.	·	1.4 km	MPC · JPL
541554	2011 SL_{94}	—	September 12, 2007	Mount Lemmon	Mount Lemmon Survey	·	1.2 km	MPC · JPL
541555	2011 SX_{96}	—	September 25, 2011	Črni Vrh	Skvarč, J.	·	1.2 km	MPC · JPL
541556	2011 SJ_{115}	—	September 21, 2011	Catalina	CSS	·	1.1 km	MPC · JPL
541557	2011 SK_{117}	—	September 23, 2011	Kitt Peak	Spacewatch	·	830 m	MPC · JPL
541558	2011 SE_{122}	—	September 21, 2011	Kitt Peak	Spacewatch	·	560 m	MPC · JPL
541559	2011 SN_{150}	—	March 28, 2008	Mount Lemmon	Mount Lemmon Survey	CYB	4.1 km	MPC · JPL
541560	2011 SY_{161}	—	September 23, 2011	Kitt Peak	Spacewatch	·	1.3 km	MPC · JPL
541561	2011 SA_{164}	—	September 23, 2011	Haleakala	Pan-STARRS 1	H	360 m	MPC · JPL
541562	2011 SW_{176}	—	September 23, 2011	Kitt Peak	Spacewatch	·	1.2 km	MPC · JPL
541563	2011 SX_{177}	—	September 23, 2011	Kitt Peak	Spacewatch	H	350 m	MPC · JPL
541564	2011 SM_{185}	—	September 26, 2011	Kitt Peak	Spacewatch	H	390 m	MPC · JPL
541565 Gucklerkároly	2011 SW_{194}	Gucklerkároly	August 26, 2011	Piszkéstető	K. Sárneczky	V	590 m	MPC · JPL
541566	2011 ST_{196}	—	August 15, 2007	Punaauia	Teamo, N.	·	890 m	MPC · JPL
541567	2011 SX_{212}	—	September 21, 2003	Haleakala	NEAT	H	480 m	MPC · JPL
541568	2011 SA_{218}	—	September 24, 2011	Haleakala	Pan-STARRS 1	·	1.1 km	MPC · JPL
541569	2011 SQ_{218}	—	September 23, 2003	Palomar	NEAT	·	760 m	MPC · JPL
541570	2011 SF_{225}	—	March 1, 2009	Mount Lemmon	Mount Lemmon Survey	·	1.4 km	MPC · JPL
541571 Schulekfrigyes	2011 SM_{232}	Schulekfrigyes	September 30, 2011	Piszkéstető	K. Sárneczky	·	1.6 km	MPC · JPL
541572	2011 SS_{238}	—	December 1, 2008	Mount Lemmon	Mount Lemmon Survey	·	1.1 km	MPC · JPL
541573	2011 SB_{239}	—	December 31, 2008	Kitt Peak	Spacewatch	·	940 m	MPC · JPL
541574	2011 SJ_{240}	—	January 19, 2009	Mount Lemmon	Mount Lemmon Survey	·	980 m	MPC · JPL
541575 Mikhailnazarov	2011 SX_{247}	Mikhailnazarov	September 28, 2011	Zelenchukskaya Stn	T. V. Krjačko, Satovski, B.	·	4.0 km	MPC · JPL
541576	2011 SF_{254}	—	July 21, 2007	Lulin	LUSS	PHO	930 m	MPC · JPL
541577	2011 SF_{258}	—	October 22, 1995	Kitt Peak	Spacewatch	3:2 · SHU	4.6 km	MPC · JPL
541578	2011 SW_{265}	—	August 10, 2007	Kitt Peak	Spacewatch	·	1.2 km	MPC · JPL
541579	2011 SA_{276}	—	October 26, 2011	Haleakala	Pan-STARRS 1	·	1.0 km	MPC · JPL
541580	2011 SS_{277}	—	May 11, 2003	Kitt Peak	Spacewatch	H	350 m	MPC · JPL
541581	2011 SR_{280}	—	September 29, 2011	Kitt Peak	Spacewatch	·	860 m	MPC · JPL
541582 Tóthimre	2011 TZ_{5}	Tóthimre	October 4, 2011	Piszkéstető	K. Sárneczky	EUN	1.4 km	MPC · JPL
541583	2011 TN_{8}	—	October 5, 2011	Haleakala	Pan-STARRS 1	H	450 m	MPC · JPL
541584	2011 TU_{8}	—	October 14, 2007	Mount Lemmon	Mount Lemmon Survey	PHO	820 m	MPC · JPL
541585	2011 TA_{11}	—	September 26, 2011	Haleakala	Pan-STARRS 1	3:2 · SHU	4.3 km	MPC · JPL
541586	2011 TZ_{11}	—	May 25, 2006	Mauna Kea	P. A. Wiegert	·	1.6 km	MPC · JPL
541587 Paparó	2011 TG_{16}	Paparó	October 1, 2011	Piszkéstető	K. Sárneczky	EUN	1.3 km	MPC · JPL
541588	2011 UO_{3}	—	September 21, 2011	Kitt Peak	Spacewatch	·	1.2 km	MPC · JPL
541589	2011 UG_{4}	—	October 3, 2011	XuYi	PMO NEO Survey Program	H	510 m	MPC · JPL
541590	2011 UM_{12}	—	September 28, 2003	Kitt Peak	Spacewatch	H	300 m	MPC · JPL
541591	2011 UQ_{12}	—	September 16, 2003	Kitt Peak	Spacewatch	·	920 m	MPC · JPL
541592	2011 UP_{15}	—	March 13, 2005	Moletai	K. Černis, Zdanavicius, J.	H	540 m	MPC · JPL
541593	2011 UA_{28}	—	November 2, 2007	Kitt Peak	Spacewatch	·	720 m	MPC · JPL
541594	2011 UT_{30}	—	December 6, 2007	Mount Lemmon	Mount Lemmon Survey	(5)	650 m	MPC · JPL
541595	2011 UR_{31}	—	September 24, 2011	Catalina	CSS	·	1.4 km	MPC · JPL
541596	2011 UP_{37}	—	October 20, 2011	Kitt Peak	Spacewatch	·	880 m	MPC · JPL
541597	2011 UA_{39}	—	October 20, 2011	Mount Lemmon	Mount Lemmon Survey	·	1.5 km	MPC · JPL
541598	2011 UA_{41}	—	September 18, 2003	Kitt Peak	Spacewatch	3:2	3.9 km	MPC · JPL
541599	2011 UW_{43}	—	August 23, 2011	Haleakala	Pan-STARRS 1	H	420 m	MPC · JPL
541600	2011 UF_{47}	—	September 17, 2003	Palomar	NEAT	T_{j} (2.94)	3.6 km	MPC · JPL

== 541601–541700 ==
back to top

Designation			Discovery			Properties		Ref
Permanent	Provisional	Named after	Date	Site	Discoverer(s)	Category	Diam.	Ref
541601	2011 UC_{51}	—	October 24, 2003	Kitt Peak	Spacewatch	T_{j} (2.99) · 3:2 · SHU	3.9 km	MPC · JPL
541602	2011 US_{52}	—	October 18, 2011	Kitt Peak	Spacewatch	H	460 m	MPC · JPL
541603	2011 UH_{63}	—	October 20, 2011	Haleakala	Pan-STARRS 1	·	1.3 km	MPC · JPL
541604	2011 UO_{64}	—	September 18, 1995	Kitt Peak	Spacewatch	3:2	4.6 km	MPC · JPL
541605	2011 UU_{66}	—	October 20, 2011	Mount Lemmon	Mount Lemmon Survey	·	1.2 km	MPC · JPL
541606	2011 UQ_{73}	—	June 11, 2010	Mount Lemmon	Mount Lemmon Survey	(5)	1.0 km	MPC · JPL
541607	2011 UK_{81}	—	November 8, 2007	Kitt Peak	Spacewatch	·	920 m	MPC · JPL
541608	2011 UT_{88}	—	October 21, 2011	Mount Lemmon	Mount Lemmon Survey	·	1.0 km	MPC · JPL
541609	2011 UZ_{91}	—	May 31, 2005	Reedy Creek	J. Broughton	H	680 m	MPC · JPL
541610	2011 UX_{98}	—	October 7, 2011	La Sagra	OAM	·	920 m	MPC · JPL
541611	2011 UF_{100}	—	October 20, 2011	Mount Lemmon	Mount Lemmon Survey	·	1.1 km	MPC · JPL
541612	2011 UU_{101}	—	November 2, 2007	Kitt Peak	Spacewatch	·	720 m	MPC · JPL
541613	2011 UO_{110}	—	October 21, 2011	Mount Lemmon	Mount Lemmon Survey	H	450 m	MPC · JPL
541614	2011 UA_{114}	—	September 21, 2003	Kitt Peak	Spacewatch	·	1.2 km	MPC · JPL
541615	2011 UO_{116}	—	October 7, 2007	Kitt Peak	Spacewatch	·	1.0 km	MPC · JPL
541616	2011 UN_{117}	—	November 12, 2007	Mount Lemmon	Mount Lemmon Survey	·	1.0 km	MPC · JPL
541617	2011 UG_{118}	—	September 26, 2011	Catalina	CSS	MAR	1.1 km	MPC · JPL
541618 Magyaribéla	2011 UY_{125}	Magyaribéla	October 3, 2011	Piszkéstető	K. Sárneczky	H	490 m	MPC · JPL
541619	2011 UE_{133}	—	October 23, 2011	Westfield	International Astronomical Search Collaboration	EUN	1.2 km	MPC · JPL
541620	2011 UP_{133}	—	October 23, 2011	Haleakala	Pan-STARRS 1	·	1.1 km	MPC · JPL
541621	2011 UK_{141}	—	November 2, 2007	Mount Lemmon	Mount Lemmon Survey	·	950 m	MPC · JPL
541622	2011 UR_{141}	—	October 23, 2011	Kitt Peak	Spacewatch	·	1.2 km	MPC · JPL
541623	2011 UV_{142}	—	October 23, 2011	Kitt Peak	Spacewatch	·	770 m	MPC · JPL
541624	2011 UR_{146}	—	October 24, 2011	Kitt Peak	Spacewatch	3:2	4.7 km	MPC · JPL
541625	2011 UF_{150}	—	September 18, 2003	Kitt Peak	Spacewatch	T_{j} (2.95)	3.0 km	MPC · JPL
541626	2011 UR_{154}	—	October 23, 2011	Kitt Peak	Spacewatch	PHO	820 m	MPC · JPL
541627 Halmospál	2011 UE_{155}	Halmospál	October 2, 2011	Piszkéstető	K. Sárneczky	MAR	1.3 km	MPC · JPL
541628	2011 UJ_{156}	—	October 24, 2011	Mount Lemmon	Mount Lemmon Survey	PHO	900 m	MPC · JPL
541629	2011 UF_{157}	—	May 4, 2005	Mauna Kea	Veillet, C.	·	2.5 km	MPC · JPL
541630	2011 UH_{160}	—	October 26, 2011	Haleakala	Pan-STARRS 1	H	600 m	MPC · JPL
541631 Kirbulychev	2011 UT_{172}	Kirbulychev	September 21, 2011	Zelenchukskaya Stn	T. V. Krjačko, Satovski, B.	·	2.2 km	MPC · JPL
541632	2011 UX_{174}	—	October 23, 2011	Haleakala	Pan-STARRS 1	·	1.0 km	MPC · JPL
541633	2011 UE_{180}	—	December 14, 2003	Kitt Peak	Spacewatch	·	770 m	MPC · JPL
541634	2011 UG_{186}	—	October 29, 2003	Kitt Peak	Spacewatch	H	440 m	MPC · JPL
541635	2011 UH_{187}	—	November 21, 2003	Kitt Peak	Spacewatch	H	520 m	MPC · JPL
541636	2011 UE_{189}	—	September 26, 2011	Kitt Peak	Spacewatch	·	2.1 km	MPC · JPL
541637	2011 UP_{191}	—	October 18, 2007	Kitt Peak	Spacewatch	·	720 m	MPC · JPL
541638	2011 UK_{194}	—	October 22, 2011	Kitt Peak	Spacewatch	H	480 m	MPC · JPL
541639	2011 UR_{196}	—	October 24, 2011	Haleakala	Pan-STARRS 1	·	1.3 km	MPC · JPL
541640	2011 UA_{198}	—	October 24, 2011	Haleakala	Pan-STARRS 1	·	1.7 km	MPC · JPL
541641	2011 UE_{198}	—	October 22, 2011	Westfield	International Astronomical Search Collaboration	H	450 m	MPC · JPL
541642	2011 UD_{202}	—	October 26, 2011	Haleakala	Pan-STARRS 1	(5)	1.0 km	MPC · JPL
541643	2011 UL_{202}	—	October 26, 2011	Haleakala	Pan-STARRS 1	·	810 m	MPC · JPL
541644	2011 US_{203}	—	October 21, 2011	Mount Lemmon	Mount Lemmon Survey	·	890 m	MPC · JPL
541645	2011 UP_{204}	—	November 14, 2007	Kitt Peak	Spacewatch	·	1.1 km	MPC · JPL
541646	2011 UR_{238}	—	October 24, 2011	Haleakala	Pan-STARRS 1	·	1.3 km	MPC · JPL
541647	2011 UB_{239}	—	October 24, 2011	Haleakala	Pan-STARRS 1	H	480 m	MPC · JPL
541648	2011 UD_{240}	—	March 11, 2005	Kitt Peak	Spacewatch	·	940 m	MPC · JPL
541649	2011 UH_{241}	—	November 5, 2007	Kitt Peak	Spacewatch	MAR	850 m	MPC · JPL
541650	2011 UG_{244}	—	September 24, 2011	Mount Lemmon	Mount Lemmon Survey	H	500 m	MPC · JPL
541651	2011 UO_{247}	—	September 24, 2011	Mount Lemmon	Mount Lemmon Survey	·	1.0 km	MPC · JPL
541652	2011 UQ_{250}	—	October 26, 2011	Haleakala	Pan-STARRS 1	·	1.1 km	MPC · JPL
541653	2011 UE_{258}	—	September 30, 2011	Mount Lemmon	Mount Lemmon Survey	·	900 m	MPC · JPL
541654	2011 US_{259}	—	October 24, 2011	Haleakala	Pan-STARRS 1	·	1.5 km	MPC · JPL
541655	2011 UF_{263}	—	April 20, 2010	Mount Lemmon	Mount Lemmon Survey	H	420 m	MPC · JPL
541656	2011 UT_{263}	—	August 14, 2007	Bergisch Gladbach	W. Bickel	·	1.4 km	MPC · JPL
541657	2011 UZ_{268}	—	February 27, 2009	Kitt Peak	Spacewatch	·	910 m	MPC · JPL
541658	2011 UD_{273}	—	August 31, 2011	Haleakala	Pan-STARRS 1	CYB	4.5 km	MPC · JPL
541659	2011 UG_{274}	—	October 1, 2011	Kitt Peak	Spacewatch	·	1.2 km	MPC · JPL
541660	2011 UU_{274}	—	May 14, 2001	Palomar	NEAT	·	2.0 km	MPC · JPL
541661	2011 UE_{275}	—	September 24, 2000	Kitt Peak	Spacewatch	·	1.9 km	MPC · JPL
541662	2011 UE_{276}	—	December 4, 2007	Catalina	CSS	KON	1.9 km	MPC · JPL
541663	2011 UP_{278}	—	October 25, 2011	Haleakala	Pan-STARRS 1	·	1.1 km	MPC · JPL
541664	2011 UQ_{307}	—	October 24, 2007	Mount Lemmon	Mount Lemmon Survey	HNS	1 km	MPC · JPL
541665	2011 UD_{308}	—	October 28, 2011	Kitt Peak	Spacewatch	(5)	1.1 km	MPC · JPL
541666	2011 UH_{319}	—	October 21, 2011	Mount Lemmon	Mount Lemmon Survey	·	980 m	MPC · JPL
541667	2011 UJ_{323}	—	October 17, 2011	Kitt Peak	Spacewatch	PHO	800 m	MPC · JPL
541668	2011 UK_{325}	—	September 15, 2007	Mount Lemmon	Mount Lemmon Survey	·	1.1 km	MPC · JPL
541669	2011 UG_{332}	—	September 25, 2011	Haleakala	Pan-STARRS 1	PHO	810 m	MPC · JPL
541670	2011 UQ_{332}	—	June 5, 2010	Nogales	M. Schwartz, P. R. Holvorcem	·	1.4 km	MPC · JPL
541671	2011 UY_{335}	—	September 20, 2003	Campo Imperatore	CINEOS	3:2	5.3 km	MPC · JPL
541672	2011 UP_{336}	—	September 24, 2011	Catalina	CSS	·	1.2 km	MPC · JPL
541673	2011 UR_{339}	—	October 20, 2007	Mount Lemmon	Mount Lemmon Survey	·	860 m	MPC · JPL
541674	2011 UG_{362}	—	November 18, 2007	Mount Lemmon	Mount Lemmon Survey	·	780 m	MPC · JPL
541675	2011 UK_{369}	—	October 22, 2011	Kitt Peak	Spacewatch	·	930 m	MPC · JPL
541676	2011 UF_{378}	—	January 23, 2006	Kitt Peak	Spacewatch	·	760 m	MPC · JPL
541677	2011 UD_{383}	—	February 20, 2006	Catalina	CSS	·	1.1 km	MPC · JPL
541678	2011 UL_{383}	—	October 24, 2011	Haleakala	Pan-STARRS 1	KON	1.9 km	MPC · JPL
541679	2011 UL_{384}	—	October 24, 2011	Haleakala	Pan-STARRS 1	·	1.2 km	MPC · JPL
541680	2011 UB_{385}	—	October 24, 2011	Haleakala	Pan-STARRS 1	·	1.3 km	MPC · JPL
541681	2011 UW_{390}	—	September 24, 2011	Haleakala	Pan-STARRS 1	·	1.1 km	MPC · JPL
541682	2011 UD_{394}	—	September 24, 2011	Haleakala	Pan-STARRS 1	EUN	1.2 km	MPC · JPL
541683	2011 UM_{394}	—	March 31, 2004	Kitt Peak	Spacewatch	·	1.8 km	MPC · JPL
541684	2011 UP_{398}	—	August 4, 2002	Palomar	NEAT	·	1.8 km	MPC · JPL
541685	2011 UF_{399}	—	October 23, 2011	Mount Lemmon	Mount Lemmon Survey	·	1.2 km	MPC · JPL
541686	2011 UQ_{399}	—	January 14, 1994	Kitt Peak	Spacewatch	MAS	600 m	MPC · JPL
541687	2011 UE_{402}	—	October 23, 2011	Haleakala	Pan-STARRS 1	H	400 m	MPC · JPL
541688	2011 UB_{405}	—	December 11, 2004	Kitt Peak	Spacewatch	T_{j} (2.98) · 3:2	3.6 km	MPC · JPL
541689	2011 UO_{415}	—	October 24, 2011	Haleakala	Pan-STARRS 1	·	1.4 km	MPC · JPL
541690	2011 UB_{419}	—	October 26, 2011	Haleakala	Pan-STARRS 1	·	880 m	MPC · JPL
541691 Ranschburg	2011 VC_{3}	Ranschburg	October 5, 2011	Piszkéstető	K. Sárneczky	EUN	1.4 km	MPC · JPL
541692	2011 VU_{10}	—	November 15, 2011	Kitt Peak	Spacewatch	KON	2.0 km	MPC · JPL
541693	2011 VX_{19}	—	November 8, 2011	Haleakala	Pan-STARRS 1	·	1.1 km	MPC · JPL
541694	2011 WZ	—	November 16, 2011	Mount Lemmon	Mount Lemmon Survey	·	1.2 km	MPC · JPL
541695	2011 WA_{1}	—	November 16, 2011	Mount Lemmon	Mount Lemmon Survey	EUN	1.0 km	MPC · JPL
541696	2011 WC_{1}	—	October 28, 2011	Mount Lemmon	Mount Lemmon Survey	·	1.6 km	MPC · JPL
541697	2011 WE_{5}	—	November 11, 2007	Mount Lemmon	Mount Lemmon Survey	·	1.3 km	MPC · JPL
541698	2011 WZ_{6}	—	August 29, 2006	Anderson Mesa	LONEOS	·	2.1 km	MPC · JPL
541699	2011 WA_{9}	—	October 24, 2011	Haleakala	Pan-STARRS 1	·	670 m	MPC · JPL
541700	2011 WO_{12}	—	October 30, 2011	Kitt Peak	Spacewatch	·	940 m	MPC · JPL

== 541701–541800 ==
back to top

Designation			Discovery			Properties		Ref
Permanent	Provisional	Named after	Date	Site	Discoverer(s)	Category	Diam.	Ref
541701	2011 WL_{16}	—	July 15, 2002	Palomar	NEAT	·	1.5 km	MPC · JPL
541702	2011 WX_{16}	—	November 5, 2007	Kitt Peak	Spacewatch	·	940 m	MPC · JPL
541703	2011 WM_{28}	—	November 13, 2007	Kitt Peak	Spacewatch	EUN	700 m	MPC · JPL
541704	2011 WC_{30}	—	November 18, 2011	Catalina	CSS	·	1.1 km	MPC · JPL
541705	2011 WS_{30}	—	October 26, 2011	Haleakala	Pan-STARRS 1	H	560 m	MPC · JPL
541706	2011 WJ_{40}	—	September 4, 2000	Kitt Peak	Spacewatch	·	2.2 km	MPC · JPL
541707	2011 WR_{40}	—	October 26, 2011	Haleakala	Pan-STARRS 1	·	860 m	MPC · JPL
541708	2011 WZ_{41}	—	September 24, 2011	Mount Lemmon	Mount Lemmon Survey	H	470 m	MPC · JPL
541709	2011 WQ_{43}	—	September 3, 2002	Palomar	NEAT	EUN	1.2 km	MPC · JPL
541710	2011 WU_{49}	—	November 23, 2011	Kitt Peak	Spacewatch	H	550 m	MPC · JPL
541711	2011 WZ_{50}	—	November 2, 2007	Kitt Peak	Spacewatch	·	560 m	MPC · JPL
541712	2011 WO_{52}	—	October 28, 2011	Kitt Peak	Spacewatch	·	1.3 km	MPC · JPL
541713	2011 WW_{55}	—	November 2, 2011	Kitt Peak	Spacewatch	·	1.2 km	MPC · JPL
541714	2011 WM_{57}	—	November 9, 2007	Kitt Peak	Spacewatch	(5)	730 m	MPC · JPL
541715	2011 WW_{60}	—	November 16, 2011	Kitt Peak	Spacewatch	·	940 m	MPC · JPL
541716	2011 WR_{61}	—	March 26, 2009	Mount Lemmon	Mount Lemmon Survey	·	3.1 km	MPC · JPL
541717	2011 WR_{65}	—	November 25, 2011	Haleakala	Pan-STARRS 1	·	1.9 km	MPC · JPL
541718	2011 WE_{66}	—	December 3, 2007	Kitt Peak	Spacewatch	MAR	980 m	MPC · JPL
541719	2011 WM_{67}	—	October 23, 2011	Haleakala	Pan-STARRS 1	MAR	770 m	MPC · JPL
541720	2011 WW_{68}	—	November 26, 2011	XuYi	PMO NEO Survey Program	·	1.2 km	MPC · JPL
541721	2011 WX_{69}	—	October 31, 2011	XuYi	PMO NEO Survey Program	H	560 m	MPC · JPL
541722	2011 WZ_{72}	—	May 4, 2005	Mauna Kea	Veillet, C.	·	940 m	MPC · JPL
541723	2011 WN_{73}	—	November 11, 2007	Socorro	LINEAR	·	2.0 km	MPC · JPL
541724	2011 WE_{78}	—	November 23, 2011	Mount Lemmon	Mount Lemmon Survey	·	1.3 km	MPC · JPL
541725	2011 WS_{88}	—	November 25, 2011	Haleakala	Pan-STARRS 1	·	1.0 km	MPC · JPL
541726	2011 WG_{90}	—	November 24, 2011	Mount Lemmon	Mount Lemmon Survey	·	1.1 km	MPC · JPL
541727	2011 WH_{91}	—	November 26, 2011	Mount Lemmon	Mount Lemmon Survey	·	1.3 km	MPC · JPL
541728	2011 WA_{99}	—	October 20, 2011	Haleakala	Pan-STARRS 1	·	670 m	MPC · JPL
541729	2011 WL_{99}	—	November 15, 2007	Mount Lemmon	Mount Lemmon Survey	·	1.0 km	MPC · JPL
541730	2011 WP_{102}	—	October 20, 2003	Kitt Peak	Spacewatch	T_{j} (2.98) · 3:2 · SHU	3.6 km	MPC · JPL
541731	2011 WH_{105}	—	October 29, 2011	Kitt Peak	Spacewatch	·	1.3 km	MPC · JPL
541732	2011 WW_{105}	—	November 28, 2011	Haleakala	Pan-STARRS 1	·	1.1 km	MPC · JPL
541733	2011 WS_{107}	—	March 17, 2009	Kitt Peak	Spacewatch	·	1.6 km	MPC · JPL
541734	2011 WU_{107}	—	September 11, 2002	Haleakala	NEAT	·	1.5 km	MPC · JPL
541735	2011 WW_{110}	—	November 18, 2011	Mount Lemmon	Mount Lemmon Survey	·	1.3 km	MPC · JPL
541736	2011 WZ_{111}	—	November 28, 2011	Kitt Peak	Spacewatch	·	800 m	MPC · JPL
541737	2011 WM_{112}	—	November 7, 2007	Kitt Peak	Spacewatch	·	1.0 km	MPC · JPL
541738	2011 WT_{112}	—	November 29, 2011	Kitt Peak	Spacewatch	·	1.1 km	MPC · JPL
541739	2011 WV_{113}	—	July 31, 2006	Siding Spring	SSS	·	1.3 km	MPC · JPL
541740	2011 WC_{118}	—	November 18, 2011	Mount Lemmon	Mount Lemmon Survey	EUN	1.1 km	MPC · JPL
541741 Fado	2011 WD_{118}	Fado	November 8, 2011	Haleakala	Pan-STARRS 1	EUN	1.2 km	MPC · JPL
541742	2011 WC_{119}	—	January 1, 2008	Mount Lemmon	Mount Lemmon Survey	·	1.3 km	MPC · JPL
541743	2011 WU_{119}	—	October 22, 2011	Kitt Peak	Spacewatch	H	560 m	MPC · JPL
541744	2011 WL_{120}	—	September 5, 2010	Mount Lemmon	Mount Lemmon Survey	·	1.4 km	MPC · JPL
541745	2011 WY_{121}	—	December 5, 2007	Mount Lemmon	Mount Lemmon Survey	·	1.4 km	MPC · JPL
541746	2011 WK_{125}	—	November 3, 2011	Mount Lemmon	Mount Lemmon Survey	·	1.1 km	MPC · JPL
541747	2011 WH_{128}	—	November 24, 2011	Mount Lemmon	Mount Lemmon Survey	H	510 m	MPC · JPL
541748	2011 WS_{136}	—	November 30, 2011	Mount Lemmon	Mount Lemmon Survey	(5)	1.1 km	MPC · JPL
541749	2011 WW_{137}	—	November 17, 2011	Kitt Peak	Spacewatch	·	980 m	MPC · JPL
541750	2011 WK_{139}	—	December 17, 2003	Kitt Peak	Spacewatch	H	480 m	MPC · JPL
541751	2011 WR_{141}	—	October 18, 2011	Mount Lemmon	Mount Lemmon Survey	(5)	880 m	MPC · JPL
541752	2011 WS_{146}	—	October 21, 2011	Kitt Peak	Spacewatch	·	1.2 km	MPC · JPL
541753	2011 WX_{146}	—	November 16, 2011	Kitt Peak	Spacewatch	·	1.7 km	MPC · JPL
541754	2011 WB_{148}	—	July 16, 2002	Palomar	NEAT	·	1.4 km	MPC · JPL
541755	2011 WG_{150}	—	October 3, 2011	La Sagra	OAM	EUN	1.1 km	MPC · JPL
541756	2011 WF_{151}	—	September 14, 2007	Catalina	CSS	·	1.1 km	MPC · JPL
541757	2011 WX_{151}	—	November 1, 2011	Catalina	CSS	·	1.2 km	MPC · JPL
541758	2011 WA_{153}	—	November 24, 2011	Palomar	Palomar Transient Factory	·	1.2 km	MPC · JPL
541759	2011 WT_{153}	—	October 23, 2011	Haleakala	Pan-STARRS 1	HNS	1.0 km	MPC · JPL
541760	2011 WZ_{153}	—	February 24, 2012	Mount Lemmon	Mount Lemmon Survey	·	1.4 km	MPC · JPL
541761	2011 WH_{154}	—	November 28, 2011	Palomar	Palomar Transient Factory	·	1.1 km	MPC · JPL
541762	2011 WM_{154}	—	December 4, 2007	Catalina	CSS	BAR	1.4 km	MPC · JPL
541763	2011 WE_{158}	—	November 28, 2011	Mount Lemmon	Mount Lemmon Survey	·	1.5 km	MPC · JPL
541764	2011 WM_{158}	—	November 17, 2011	Mount Lemmon	Mount Lemmon Survey	·	1.1 km	MPC · JPL
541765	2011 WB_{159}	—	November 24, 2011	Mount Lemmon	Mount Lemmon Survey	·	1.0 km	MPC · JPL
541766	2011 WM_{159}	—	November 30, 2011	Mount Lemmon	Mount Lemmon Survey	·	1.4 km	MPC · JPL
541767	2011 XR_{1}	—	November 27, 2011	Kitt Peak	Spacewatch	·	1.1 km	MPC · JPL
541768	2011 XY_{2}	—	May 14, 2010	Mount Lemmon	Mount Lemmon Survey	H	600 m	MPC · JPL
541769	2011 YH	—	June 11, 2010	Mount Lemmon	Mount Lemmon Survey	H	500 m	MPC · JPL
541770	2011 YF_{4}	—	November 24, 2011	Mount Lemmon	Mount Lemmon Survey	·	1.2 km	MPC · JPL
541771	2011 YW_{5}	—	December 24, 2011	Catalina	CSS	·	1.8 km	MPC · JPL
541772	2011 YY_{7}	—	November 18, 2011	Mount Lemmon	Mount Lemmon Survey	·	1.2 km	MPC · JPL
541773	2011 YC_{10}	—	January 1, 2008	Kitt Peak	Spacewatch	·	1.0 km	MPC · JPL
541774	2011 YQ_{11}	—	June 20, 2002	La Palma	S. Collander-Brown, A. Fitzsimmons	·	1.1 km	MPC · JPL
541775	2011 YS_{12}	—	November 4, 2002	Palomar	NEAT	·	1.4 km	MPC · JPL
541776 Oláhkatalin	2011 YZ_{12}	Oláhkatalin	November 7, 2011	Piszkéstető	K. Vida, K. Sárneczky	·	1.4 km	MPC · JPL
541777	2011 YU_{14}	—	December 26, 2011	Les Engarouines	L. Bernasconi	·	1.5 km	MPC · JPL
541778	2011 YH_{15}	—	December 26, 2011	Oukaïmeden	M. Ory	(5)	1.3 km	MPC · JPL
541779	2011 YP_{15}	—	December 27, 2011	SM Montmagastrell	Bosch, J. M., Olivera, R. M.	·	930 m	MPC · JPL
541780	2011 YN_{16}	—	December 5, 2007	Kitt Peak	Spacewatch	·	610 m	MPC · JPL
541781	2011 YW_{18}	—	January 18, 2009	Kitt Peak	Spacewatch	·	800 m	MPC · JPL
541782	2011 YM_{19}	—	January 30, 2008	Catalina	CSS	(5)	1.0 km	MPC · JPL
541783	2011 YN_{25}	—	December 25, 2011	Kitt Peak	Spacewatch	·	1.4 km	MPC · JPL
541784	2011 YP_{28}	—	August 19, 2002	Palomar	NEAT	·	1.4 km	MPC · JPL
541785	2011 YO_{29}	—	December 24, 2011	Mount Lemmon	Mount Lemmon Survey	·	1.9 km	MPC · JPL
541786	2011 YV_{30}	—	February 14, 2008	Catalina	CSS	·	1.2 km	MPC · JPL
541787	2011 YG_{36}	—	November 27, 2011	Mount Lemmon	Mount Lemmon Survey	·	1.2 km	MPC · JPL
541788	2011 YU_{37}	—	December 26, 2011	Kitt Peak	Spacewatch	EUN	1.3 km	MPC · JPL
541789	2011 YJ_{38}	—	November 14, 2002	Palomar	NEAT	EUN	1.8 km	MPC · JPL
541790	2011 YO_{38}	—	November 22, 2011	Mount Lemmon	Mount Lemmon Survey	H	630 m	MPC · JPL
541791	2011 YU_{39}	—	March 12, 2008	Catalina	CSS	·	1.5 km	MPC · JPL
541792	2011 YZ_{43}	—	December 16, 2011	Mount Lemmon	Mount Lemmon Survey	HNS	1.4 km	MPC · JPL
541793	2011 YA_{44}	—	March 1, 2008	Catalina	CSS	·	1.6 km	MPC · JPL
541794	2011 YX_{46}	—	February 11, 2008	Kitt Peak	Spacewatch	·	840 m	MPC · JPL
541795	2011 YJ_{59}	—	January 10, 2008	Mount Lemmon	Mount Lemmon Survey	·	1.4 km	MPC · JPL
541796	2011 YG_{60}	—	February 28, 2008	Kitt Peak	Spacewatch	·	1.5 km	MPC · JPL
541797	2011 YW_{61}	—	December 28, 2007	Kitt Peak	Spacewatch	·	1.3 km	MPC · JPL
541798	2011 YB_{62}	—	December 27, 2011	Mayhill	L. Elenin	H	620 m	MPC · JPL
541799	2011 YE_{64}	—	December 26, 2011	Kitt Peak	Spacewatch	·	2.0 km	MPC · JPL
541800	2011 YP_{64}	—	December 31, 2011	Kitt Peak	Spacewatch	·	920 m	MPC · JPL

== 541801–541900 ==
back to top

Designation			Discovery			Properties		Ref
Permanent	Provisional	Named after	Date	Site	Discoverer(s)	Category	Diam.	Ref
541801 Kendurkar	2011 YY_{65}	Kendurkar	March 16, 2004	Mauna Kea	D. D. Balam	·	830 m	MPC · JPL
541802	2011 YO_{66}	—	November 23, 2006	Mount Lemmon	Mount Lemmon Survey	·	1.4 km	MPC · JPL
541803	2011 YQ_{67}	—	January 20, 2008	Mount Lemmon	Mount Lemmon Survey	·	1.1 km	MPC · JPL
541804	2011 YW_{68}	—	September 13, 2006	Bergisch Gladbach	W. Bickel	JUN	900 m	MPC · JPL
541805	2011 YE_{72}	—	February 10, 2008	Kitt Peak	Spacewatch	·	1.3 km	MPC · JPL
541806	2011 YX_{75}	—	December 29, 2011	Mount Lemmon	Mount Lemmon Survey	·	1.1 km	MPC · JPL
541807	2011 YK_{78}	—	November 28, 2011	Mount Lemmon	Mount Lemmon Survey	·	1.8 km	MPC · JPL
541808	2011 YC_{79}	—	October 27, 2011	Mount Lemmon	Mount Lemmon Survey	·	1.5 km	MPC · JPL
541809	2011 YS_{79}	—	February 9, 2008	Mount Lemmon	Mount Lemmon Survey	·	1.6 km	MPC · JPL
541810	2011 YT_{79}	—	August 10, 2010	Kitt Peak	Spacewatch	·	1.3 km	MPC · JPL
541811	2012 AV	—	January 2, 2012	Catalina	CSS	·	910 m	MPC · JPL
541812	2012 AV_{1}	—	January 2, 2012	Kitt Peak	Spacewatch	·	1.2 km	MPC · JPL
541813	2012 AE_{5}	—	December 31, 2007	Kitt Peak	Spacewatch	·	1.1 km	MPC · JPL
541814	2012 AR_{5}	—	January 13, 2008	Kitt Peak	Spacewatch	ADE	1.6 km	MPC · JPL
541815	2012 AL_{6}	—	March 2, 2008	Mount Lemmon	Mount Lemmon Survey	·	1.1 km	MPC · JPL
541816	2012 AM_{7}	—	January 17, 2004	Kitt Peak	Spacewatch	H	530 m	MPC · JPL
541817	2012 AB_{10}	—	January 4, 2012	Mount Lemmon	Mount Lemmon Survey	EUN	1.3 km	MPC · JPL
541818	2012 AX_{10}	—	January 30, 2004	Catalina	CSS	H	730 m	MPC · JPL
541819	2012 AO_{11}	—	April 7, 2008	Mount Lemmon	Mount Lemmon Survey	·	1.6 km	MPC · JPL
541820	2012 AF_{16}	—	October 17, 2006	Catalina	CSS	·	1.7 km	MPC · JPL
541821	2012 AG_{17}	—	January 3, 2003	La Silla	La Silla	·	1.7 km	MPC · JPL
541822	2012 AF_{19}	—	January 15, 2008	Mount Lemmon	Mount Lemmon Survey	·	1.1 km	MPC · JPL
541823	2012 AK_{20}	—	February 12, 2008	Mount Lemmon	Mount Lemmon Survey	·	1.0 km	MPC · JPL
541824	2012 AK_{21}	—	January 1, 2008	Catalina	CSS	·	1.7 km	MPC · JPL
541825	2012 AB_{22}	—	December 16, 2011	Mount Lemmon	Mount Lemmon Survey	JUN	1.0 km	MPC · JPL
541826	2012 AC_{24}	—	February 29, 2012	Mount Lemmon	Mount Lemmon Survey	EUN	1.1 km	MPC · JPL
541827	2012 AF_{24}	—	December 31, 2007	Kitt Peak	Spacewatch	·	1.4 km	MPC · JPL
541828	2012 AV_{24}	—	October 17, 2010	Mount Lemmon	Mount Lemmon Survey	·	1.8 km	MPC · JPL
541829	2012 AY_{24}	—	January 5, 2012	Haleakala	Pan-STARRS 1	·	1.9 km	MPC · JPL
541830	2012 AA_{25}	—	January 5, 2012	Haleakala	Pan-STARRS 1	GEF	1.2 km	MPC · JPL
541831	2012 AV_{25}	—	January 4, 2012	Mount Lemmon	Mount Lemmon Survey	·	1.5 km	MPC · JPL
541832	2012 BG_{7}	—	March 13, 2008	Kitt Peak	Spacewatch	AST	1.5 km	MPC · JPL
541833	2012 BG_{9}	—	April 11, 2008	Mount Lemmon	Mount Lemmon Survey	·	1.5 km	MPC · JPL
541834	2012 BE_{10}	—	January 18, 2012	Kitt Peak	Spacewatch	·	1.7 km	MPC · JPL
541835	2012 BQ_{11}	—	January 17, 2012	Les Engarouines	L. Bernasconi	·	2.0 km	MPC · JPL
541836	2012 BW_{12}	—	December 18, 2011	Les Engarouines	L. Bernasconi	BAR	1.5 km	MPC · JPL
541837	2012 BE_{16}	—	December 31, 2007	Mount Lemmon	Mount Lemmon Survey	(5)	900 m	MPC · JPL
541838	2012 BW_{18}	—	October 12, 2010	Mount Lemmon	Mount Lemmon Survey	HOF	2.5 km	MPC · JPL
541839	2012 BP_{21}	—	February 9, 2008	Catalina	CSS	(5)	1.4 km	MPC · JPL
541840	2012 BM_{22}	—	December 21, 2011	Črni Vrh	Mikuž, H.	·	1.3 km	MPC · JPL
541841	2012 BB_{24}	—	September 11, 2001	Anderson Mesa	LONEOS	·	2.2 km	MPC · JPL
541842 Amygreaves	2012 BF_{24}	Amygreaves	January 18, 2012	Mayhill	Falla, N.	·	1.4 km	MPC · JPL
541843	2012 BZ_{27}	—	November 3, 2010	Mount Lemmon	Mount Lemmon Survey	WIT	960 m	MPC · JPL
541844	2012 BM_{35}	—	October 25, 2007	Mount Lemmon	Mount Lemmon Survey	JUN	1.1 km	MPC · JPL
541845	2012 BQ_{37}	—	January 19, 2012	Catalina	CSS	·	1.5 km	MPC · JPL
541846	2012 BS_{41}	—	January 6, 2012	Kitt Peak	Spacewatch	·	980 m	MPC · JPL
541847	2012 BB_{45}	—	January 19, 2012	Mount Lemmon	Mount Lemmon Survey	·	1.2 km	MPC · JPL
541848	2012 BA_{49}	—	January 20, 2012	Mount Lemmon	Mount Lemmon Survey	·	1.3 km	MPC · JPL
541849	2012 BG_{52}	—	January 21, 2012	Kitt Peak	Spacewatch	·	1.5 km	MPC · JPL
541850	2012 BW_{55}	—	January 21, 2012	Kitt Peak	Spacewatch	AGN	1.2 km	MPC · JPL
541851	2012 BD_{59}	—	October 12, 2006	Palomar	NEAT	·	1.5 km	MPC · JPL
541852	2012 BF_{61}	—	January 25, 2012	Haleakala	Pan-STARRS 1	·	1.4 km	MPC · JPL
541853	2012 BL_{61}	—	January 26, 2012	Črni Vrh	Skvarč, J.	H	550 m	MPC · JPL
541854	2012 BO_{65}	—	October 3, 2006	Mount Lemmon	Mount Lemmon Survey	·	1.7 km	MPC · JPL
541855	2012 BE_{69}	—	March 5, 2008	Mount Lemmon	Mount Lemmon Survey	·	1.4 km	MPC · JPL
541856	2012 BF_{69}	—	March 26, 2008	Mount Lemmon	Mount Lemmon Survey	·	1.1 km	MPC · JPL
541857	2012 BV_{69}	—	January 21, 2012	Kitt Peak	Spacewatch	·	1.3 km	MPC · JPL
541858	2012 BR_{70}	—	January 21, 2012	Kitt Peak	Spacewatch	·	1.0 km	MPC · JPL
541859	2012 BH_{71}	—	January 21, 2012	Kitt Peak	Spacewatch	·	1.7 km	MPC · JPL
541860	2012 BU_{77}	—	December 31, 2011	Kitt Peak	Spacewatch	·	1.5 km	MPC · JPL
541861	2012 BU_{80}	—	January 17, 2008	Kitt Peak	Spacewatch	·	870 m	MPC · JPL
541862	2012 BP_{85}	—	September 10, 2010	Mount Lemmon	Mount Lemmon Survey	·	1.2 km	MPC · JPL
541863	2012 BB_{91}	—	August 15, 2006	Lulin	LUSS	·	1.2 km	MPC · JPL
541864	2012 BS_{93}	—	December 30, 2011	Mount Lemmon	Mount Lemmon Survey	MAR	1.2 km	MPC · JPL
541865	2012 BV_{93}	—	March 2, 2008	Mount Lemmon	Mount Lemmon Survey	(5)	940 m	MPC · JPL
541866	2012 BP_{99}	—	August 16, 2009	Kitt Peak	Spacewatch	·	1.9 km	MPC · JPL
541867	2012 BZ_{104}	—	November 22, 2011	Mount Lemmon	Mount Lemmon Survey	·	1.5 km	MPC · JPL
541868	2012 BA_{105}	—	January 25, 2012	Catalina	CSS	·	1.6 km	MPC · JPL
541869	2012 BN_{106}	—	January 25, 2012	Haleakala	Pan-STARRS 1	526	2.0 km	MPC · JPL
541870	2012 BB_{111}	—	January 27, 2012	Mount Lemmon	Mount Lemmon Survey	·	1.9 km	MPC · JPL
541871	2012 BX_{115}	—	August 28, 2005	Siding Spring	SSS	·	1.9 km	MPC · JPL
541872	2012 BT_{117}	—	January 27, 2012	Mount Lemmon	Mount Lemmon Survey	·	1.1 km	MPC · JPL
541873	2012 BW_{122}	—	January 21, 2012	Kitt Peak	Spacewatch	·	1.5 km	MPC · JPL
541874	2012 BL_{129}	—	January 21, 2012	Kitt Peak	Spacewatch	(5)	1.1 km	MPC · JPL
541875	2012 BQ_{129}	—	January 19, 2012	Kitt Peak	Spacewatch	H	540 m	MPC · JPL
541876	2012 BX_{129}	—	February 2, 2008	Kitt Peak	Spacewatch	(5)	1.3 km	MPC · JPL
541877	2012 BY_{129}	—	January 8, 1994	Kitt Peak	Spacewatch	·	2.0 km	MPC · JPL
541878 Jessicatallulah	2012 BX_{130}	Jessicatallulah	January 18, 2012	Mayhill	Falla, N.	EUN	1.1 km	MPC · JPL
541879	2012 BP_{131}	—	October 15, 2002	Palomar	NEAT	·	1.5 km	MPC · JPL
541880	2012 BT_{132}	—	January 29, 2004	Anderson Mesa	LONEOS	H	710 m	MPC · JPL
541881	2012 BH_{135}	—	December 6, 2000	Kitt Peak	Spacewatch	THM	2.0 km	MPC · JPL
541882	2012 BB_{136}	—	November 12, 2007	Mount Lemmon	Mount Lemmon Survey	·	1.4 km	MPC · JPL
541883	2012 BY_{143}	—	January 25, 2012	Haleakala	Pan-STARRS 1	·	1.6 km	MPC · JPL
541884	2012 BM_{151}	—	December 25, 2011	Kitt Peak	Spacewatch	EUN	1.1 km	MPC · JPL
541885	2012 BU_{151}	—	March 15, 2008	Mount Lemmon	Mount Lemmon Survey	·	1.0 km	MPC · JPL
541886	2012 BJ_{152}	—	January 21, 2012	Haleakala	Pan-STARRS 1	EUN	1.1 km	MPC · JPL
541887	2012 BQ_{156}	—	February 11, 2008	Mount Lemmon	Mount Lemmon Survey	EUN	1.2 km	MPC · JPL
541888	2012 BX_{156}	—	April 14, 2008	Mount Lemmon	Mount Lemmon Survey	·	1.6 km	MPC · JPL
541889	2012 BY_{156}	—	March 13, 2008	Catalina	CSS	·	1.9 km	MPC · JPL
541890	2012 BZ_{156}	—	February 8, 2008	Mount Lemmon	Mount Lemmon Survey	HNS	840 m	MPC · JPL
541891	2012 BB_{157}	—	October 28, 2006	Mount Lemmon	Mount Lemmon Survey	·	990 m	MPC · JPL
541892	2012 BN_{158}	—	January 21, 2012	Kitt Peak	Spacewatch	·	1.3 km	MPC · JPL
541893	2012 BQ_{158}	—	January 21, 2012	Kitt Peak	Spacewatch	HNS	970 m	MPC · JPL
541894	2012 BS_{158}	—	January 22, 2012	Haleakala	Pan-STARRS 1	·	1.8 km	MPC · JPL
541895	2012 BC_{159}	—	September 16, 2006	Kitt Peak	Spacewatch	·	1.1 km	MPC · JPL
541896	2012 BS_{159}	—	December 15, 2006	Kitt Peak	Spacewatch	·	1.8 km	MPC · JPL
541897 TRAPPIST	2012 CK	TRAPPIST	February 1, 2012	La Silla	TRAPPIST	·	1.5 km	MPC · JPL
541898	2012 CQ_{1}	—	February 1, 2012	Kitt Peak	Spacewatch	·	1.9 km	MPC · JPL
541899	2012 CJ_{23}	—	September 16, 2006	Catalina	CSS	·	1.5 km	MPC · JPL
541900	2012 CR_{28}	—	October 7, 2005	Kitt Peak	Spacewatch	·	1.6 km	MPC · JPL

== 541901–542000 ==
back to top

Designation			Discovery			Properties		Ref
Permanent	Provisional	Named after	Date	Site	Discoverer(s)	Category	Diam.	Ref
541901	2012 CK_{30}	—	January 26, 2012	Haleakala	Pan-STARRS 1	·	1.4 km	MPC · JPL
541902	2012 CX_{31}	—	January 4, 2012	Mount Lemmon	Mount Lemmon Survey	·	1.4 km	MPC · JPL
541903	2012 CE_{34}	—	January 26, 2012	Mount Lemmon	Mount Lemmon Survey	GEF	1.2 km	MPC · JPL
541904	2012 CN_{36}	—	February 4, 2012	Haleakala	Pan-STARRS 1	H	580 m	MPC · JPL
541905	2012 CP_{37}	—	January 19, 2012	Catalina	CSS	·	1.3 km	MPC · JPL
541906	2012 CL_{44}	—	October 10, 2001	Palomar	NEAT	AEO	1.3 km	MPC · JPL
541907	2012 CR_{49}	—	February 13, 2012	Haleakala	Pan-STARRS 1	·	1.8 km	MPC · JPL
541908	2012 CX_{58}	—	March 29, 2008	Kitt Peak	Spacewatch	·	1.4 km	MPC · JPL
541909	2012 CR_{59}	—	January 26, 2012	Mount Lemmon	Mount Lemmon Survey	·	1.7 km	MPC · JPL
541910	2012 DV	—	April 22, 2007	Catalina	CSS	H	610 m	MPC · JPL
541911	2012 DW	—	October 6, 2002	Palomar	NEAT	H	600 m	MPC · JPL
541912	2012 DV_{3}	—	October 5, 2002	Palomar	NEAT	·	1.5 km	MPC · JPL
541913	2012 DN_{8}	—	August 16, 2005	Wrightwood	J. W. Young	·	1.6 km	MPC · JPL
541914	2012 DB_{11}	—	January 22, 2012	Haleakala	Pan-STARRS 1	·	1.6 km	MPC · JPL
541915	2012 DC_{17}	—	February 10, 2007	Mount Lemmon	Mount Lemmon Survey	·	2.5 km	MPC · JPL
541916	2012 DH_{20}	—	November 13, 2002	Palomar	NEAT	·	1.1 km	MPC · JPL
541917	2012 DG_{22}	—	September 28, 2003	Anderson Mesa	LONEOS	·	4.5 km	MPC · JPL
541918	2012 DA_{24}	—	February 13, 2008	Mount Lemmon	Mount Lemmon Survey	·	1.1 km	MPC · JPL
541919	2012 DK_{32}	—	April 16, 2008	Mount Lemmon	Mount Lemmon Survey	·	2.4 km	MPC · JPL
541920	2012 DC_{33}	—	February 20, 2012	Haleakala	Pan-STARRS 1	·	1.4 km	MPC · JPL
541921	2012 DF_{44}	—	December 1, 1996	Kitt Peak	Spacewatch	·	1.9 km	MPC · JPL
541922	2012 DF_{46}	—	September 28, 2006	Kitt Peak	Spacewatch	·	1.0 km	MPC · JPL
541923	2012 DJ_{58}	—	February 26, 2012	Haleakala	Pan-STARRS 1	HNS	1.0 km	MPC · JPL
541924	2012 DK_{58}	—	October 1, 2005	Kitt Peak	Spacewatch	·	1.9 km	MPC · JPL
541925	2012 DQ_{59}	—	August 27, 2005	Palomar	NEAT	HNS	1.2 km	MPC · JPL
541926	2012 DT_{63}	—	February 14, 2012	Haleakala	Pan-STARRS 1	·	1.4 km	MPC · JPL
541927	2012 DT_{65}	—	February 16, 2012	Haleakala	Pan-STARRS 1	·	1.2 km	MPC · JPL
541928	2012 DF_{73}	—	October 28, 2006	Catalina	CSS	JUN	990 m	MPC · JPL
541929	2012 DO_{79}	—	March 2, 2001	Haleakala	NEAT	H	730 m	MPC · JPL
541930	2012 DV_{84}	—	February 26, 2012	Catalina	CSS	·	2.4 km	MPC · JPL
541931	2012 DL_{86}	—	April 11, 2008	Mount Lemmon	Mount Lemmon Survey	·	1.5 km	MPC · JPL
541932	2012 DM_{86}	—	January 28, 2007	Mount Lemmon	Mount Lemmon Survey	·	1.6 km	MPC · JPL
541933	2012 DE_{101}	—	February 21, 2012	Mount Lemmon	Mount Lemmon Survey	·	1.7 km	MPC · JPL
541934	2012 DW_{101}	—	February 16, 2012	Haleakala	Pan-STARRS 1	·	1.6 km	MPC · JPL
541935	2012 DA_{102}	—	February 18, 2012	Catalina	CSS	·	1.8 km	MPC · JPL
541936	2012 DK_{102}	—	February 21, 2012	Kitt Peak	Spacewatch	·	2.1 km	MPC · JPL
541937	2012 DW_{102}	—	February 24, 2012	Kitt Peak	Spacewatch	·	1.6 km	MPC · JPL
541938	2012 DZ_{102}	—	September 2, 2010	Mount Lemmon	Mount Lemmon Survey	·	1.5 km	MPC · JPL
541939	2012 DC_{103}	—	January 28, 2007	Mount Lemmon	Mount Lemmon Survey	HOF	2.6 km	MPC · JPL
541940	2012 DG_{103}	—	February 26, 2012	Kitt Peak	Spacewatch	·	1.5 km	MPC · JPL
541941	2012 DR_{103}	—	September 12, 2010	Kitt Peak	Spacewatch	·	1.4 km	MPC · JPL
541942	2012 DP_{105}	—	February 28, 2012	Haleakala	Pan-STARRS 1	·	2.1 km	MPC · JPL
541943	2012 DH_{106}	—	February 27, 2012	Haleakala	Pan-STARRS 1	·	1.5 km	MPC · JPL
541944	2012 EO_{2}	—	July 29, 2005	Palomar	NEAT	HNS	1.5 km	MPC · JPL
541945	2012 ER_{2}	—	January 19, 2012	Haleakala	Pan-STARRS 1	ADE	1.9 km	MPC · JPL
541946	2012 EJ_{7}	—	March 13, 2012	Mount Lemmon	Mount Lemmon Survey	·	1.5 km	MPC · JPL
541947	2012 EW_{10}	—	February 26, 2012	Kitt Peak	Spacewatch	·	1.5 km	MPC · JPL
541948	2012 EN_{13}	—	December 13, 2006	Kitt Peak	Spacewatch	NEM	2.2 km	MPC · JPL
541949	2012 ET_{15}	—	October 12, 2010	Mount Lemmon	Mount Lemmon Survey	·	2.0 km	MPC · JPL
541950	2012 EM_{16}	—	November 17, 2006	Mount Lemmon	Mount Lemmon Survey	·	1.3 km	MPC · JPL
541951	2012 EF_{19}	—	March 4, 2012	Mount Lemmon	Mount Lemmon Survey	·	1.8 km	MPC · JPL
541952	2012 EH_{19}	—	May 2, 2003	Kitt Peak	Spacewatch	·	2.0 km	MPC · JPL
541953	2012 EM_{19}	—	January 17, 2007	Catalina	CSS	·	1.7 km	MPC · JPL
541954	2012 EY_{19}	—	March 15, 2012	Kitt Peak	Spacewatch	·	1.8 km	MPC · JPL
541955	2012 EA_{20}	—	March 14, 2012	Haleakala	Pan-STARRS 1	·	2.4 km	MPC · JPL
541956	2012 EE_{20}	—	March 13, 2012	Mount Lemmon	Mount Lemmon Survey	KOR	1.4 km	MPC · JPL
541957	2012 EF_{20}	—	March 13, 2012	Mount Lemmon	Mount Lemmon Survey	·	1.5 km	MPC · JPL
541958	2012 FL	—	March 30, 2008	Kitt Peak	Spacewatch	·	1.4 km	MPC · JPL
541959	2012 FG_{1}	—	March 17, 2012	Catalina	CSS	·	2.4 km	MPC · JPL
541960	2012 FJ_{1}	—	October 1, 2005	Kitt Peak	Spacewatch	·	1.7 km	MPC · JPL
541961	2012 FT_{4}	—	November 12, 2010	Kitt Peak	Spacewatch	·	1.5 km	MPC · JPL
541962	2012 FY_{8}	—	October 20, 2006	Mount Lemmon	Mount Lemmon Survey	(5)	1.0 km	MPC · JPL
541963	2012 FY_{22}	—	October 30, 2010	Piszkés-tető	K. Sárneczky, Z. Kuli	·	1.5 km	MPC · JPL
541964	2012 FA_{27}	—	August 26, 2005	Palomar	NEAT	·	2.2 km	MPC · JPL
541965	2012 FY_{27}	—	March 20, 2012	Haleakala	Pan-STARRS 1	MAR	970 m	MPC · JPL
541966	2012 FN_{30}	—	February 26, 2012	Kitt Peak	Spacewatch	·	1.4 km	MPC · JPL
541967	2012 FE_{38}	—	March 25, 2012	Mount Lemmon	Mount Lemmon Survey	·	2.0 km	MPC · JPL
541968	2012 FK_{47}	—	March 13, 2012	Mount Lemmon	Mount Lemmon Survey	·	1.2 km	MPC · JPL
541969	2012 FR_{48}	—	September 29, 2005	Kitt Peak	Spacewatch	HOF	2.2 km	MPC · JPL
541970	2012 FP_{50}	—	October 29, 2005	Kitt Peak	Spacewatch	HOF	2.5 km	MPC · JPL
541971	2012 FZ_{56}	—	March 27, 2012	Mayhill	L. Elenin	H	480 m	MPC · JPL
541972	2012 FM_{57}	—	March 27, 2012	Mayhill	L. Elenin	·	1.3 km	MPC · JPL
541973	2012 FE_{59}	—	December 25, 2011	Mount Lemmon	Mount Lemmon Survey	BRA	1.7 km	MPC · JPL
541974	2012 FX_{67}	—	March 30, 2008	Kitt Peak	Spacewatch	·	1.3 km	MPC · JPL
541975	2012 FN_{68}	—	February 28, 2012	Haleakala	Pan-STARRS 1	615	1.2 km	MPC · JPL
541976	2012 FS_{74}	—	February 24, 2012	Haleakala	Pan-STARRS 1	·	2.2 km	MPC · JPL
541977	2012 FE_{78}	—	August 27, 2005	Palomar	NEAT	MAR	1.1 km	MPC · JPL
541978	2012 FY_{80}	—	November 6, 2010	Catalina	CSS	·	2.3 km	MPC · JPL
541979	2012 FY_{81}	—	March 22, 2012	Palomar	Palomar Transient Factory	·	2.2 km	MPC · JPL
541980	2012 FB_{83}	—	February 28, 2012	Haleakala	Pan-STARRS 1	·	1.6 km	MPC · JPL
541981	2012 FJ_{86}	—	March 27, 2012	Mount Lemmon	Mount Lemmon Survey	·	1.8 km	MPC · JPL
541982 Grendel	2012 FF_{87}	Grendel	March 16, 2012	Piszkéstető	K. Sárneczky, S. Kürti	·	1.2 km	MPC · JPL
541983 Matthiaspenselin	2012 GN_{5}	Matthiaspenselin	April 25, 2003	Kitt Peak	Spacewatch	·	1.5 km	MPC · JPL
541984	2012 GU_{6}	—	March 13, 2012	Kitt Peak	Spacewatch	·	1.2 km	MPC · JPL
541985	2012 GU_{7}	—	November 3, 2010	Kitt Peak	Spacewatch	GEF	1.2 km	MPC · JPL
541986	2012 GO_{8}	—	March 26, 2007	Mount Lemmon	Mount Lemmon Survey	·	1.8 km	MPC · JPL
541987	2012 GG_{15}	—	September 3, 2002	Palomar	NEAT	EUP	3.3 km	MPC · JPL
541988	2012 GL_{16}	—	January 26, 2007	Kitt Peak	Spacewatch	·	1.4 km	MPC · JPL
541989	2012 GP_{18}	—	March 26, 1995	Kitt Peak	Spacewatch	·	2.2 km	MPC · JPL
541990	2012 GW_{20}	—	March 9, 2003	Palomar	NEAT	·	1.7 km	MPC · JPL
541991	2012 GN_{25}	—	September 27, 2009	Mount Lemmon	Mount Lemmon Survey	·	1.8 km	MPC · JPL
541992 Lukácsbéla	2012 GE_{26}	Lukácsbéla	March 27, 2012	Piszkéstető	K. Sárneczky	·	2.3 km	MPC · JPL
541993	2012 GS_{27}	—	February 2, 2006	Kitt Peak	Spacewatch	·	3.0 km	MPC · JPL
541994	2012 HJ_{4}	—	April 24, 2007	Mount Lemmon	Mount Lemmon Survey	·	1.8 km	MPC · JPL
541995	2012 HE_{8}	—	April 21, 2012	Mount Lemmon	Mount Lemmon Survey	·	520 m	MPC · JPL
541996	2012 HU_{8}	—	June 24, 2007	Lulin	LUSS	·	4.0 km	MPC · JPL
541997	2012 HP_{10}	—	March 27, 2012	Mayhill	L. Elenin	ADE	1.8 km	MPC · JPL
541998	2012 HD_{11}	—	April 20, 2012	Mount Lemmon	Mount Lemmon Survey	·	1.7 km	MPC · JPL
541999	2012 HC_{12}	—	November 7, 2005	Mauna Kea	A. Boattini	·	2.1 km	MPC · JPL
542000	2012 HR_{12}	—	January 27, 2011	Kitt Peak	Spacewatch	·	1.8 km	MPC · JPL

back to top

== Meaning of names ==
As minor planet discoveries are confirmed, they are given a permanent number by the IAU's Minor Planet Center (MPC), and the discoverers can then submit names for them, following the IAU's naming conventions. The list below concerns those minor planets in the specified number-range that have received names, and explains the meanings of those names.

Official naming citations of newly named small Solar System bodies are approved and published in a bulletin by IAU's Working Group for Small Bodies Nomenclature (WGSBN). Before May 2021, citations were published in MPC's Minor Planet Circulars for many decades. Recent citations can also be found on the JPL Small-Body Database (SBDB). Until his death in 2016, German astronomer Lutz D. Schmadel compiled these citations into the Dictionary of Minor Planet Names (DMP) and regularly updated the collection.

Based on Paul Herget's The Names of the Minor Planets, Schmadel also researched the unclear origin of numerous asteroids, most of which had been named prior to World War II. This article incorporates text from this source, which is in the public domain: SBDB New namings may only be added to this list below after official publication as the preannouncement of names is condemned. The WGSBN publishes a comprehensive guideline for the naming rules of non-cometary small Solar System bodies.

Named minor planet	Provisional	This minor planet was named for...	Ref · Catalog
541132 Leleākūhonua	2015 TG_{387}	Leleākūhonua is a life form mentioned in the Hawaiian creation chant, the Kumulipo. The name compares the orbit to the flight of migratory birds and evokes a yearning to be near Earth. Me he manu i ke ala pō`aiapuni lā, he pa`a mau nō ia i ka hui me kona pūnana i kumu mai ai.	JPL · 541132
541184 Babjak	2011 BN_{44}	Babjak represents the name of a famous Slovak family of opera singers.	IAU · 541184
541185 Boldogkői	2011 BO_{44}	Zsolt Boldogkői (b. 1961), a Hungarian molecular biologist.	IAU · 541185
541200 Komjádibéla	2011 BJ_{107}	Béla Komjádi (1892–1933), a Hungarian water polo player and coach.	IAU · 541200
541222 Ianbaker	2011 CB_{17}	Ian Baker, expert in solid-state imaging who has been a significant contributor to the development of CCD and infrared imaging technologies for over 50 years.	IAU · 541222
541288 Rogerhaynes	2011 ET_{81}	Roger Haynes (b. 1964) has a distinguished career in astronomical instrumentation that includes technical contributions and managerial leadership at major research institutions including the Anglo Australian Observatory (IRIS2 instrument), the Leibnitz-Institut für Astrophysik Potsdam (4MOST instrument), and the Australian National University.	IAU · 541288
541318 Mirasteilas	2011 FD_{61}	Mirasteilas is the Romansh word for “watch the stars” and the name of the observatory (MPC code B67) in Falera, Switzerland, where this minor planet was discovered.	IAU · 541318
541487 Silviapablo	2011 OG_{18}	Silvia (born 2006) and Pablo (born 2010) are the children of the Spanish amateur astronomer Juanjo Gonzalez.	IAU · 541487
541508 Liucixin	2011 QK_{37}	Liu Cixin (b. 1963) is a Chinese science-fiction writer. He received the 2015 Hugo Award for his novel The Three-Body Problem.	IAU · 541508
541550 Schickbéla	2011 SR_{68}	Béla Schick (1877–1967) was a Hungarian-born American pediatrician, known for his Schick test he developed in 1913	IAU · 541550
541565 Gucklerkároly	2011 SW_{194}	Károly Guckler (1858–1923) was a Hungarian forester, best known for the reforestation of the Hármashatár hill in Budapest city, Hungary.	IAU · 541565
541571 Schulekfrigyes	2011 SM_{232}	Frigyes Schulek (1841–1919) was a Hungarian architect, full professor at the Technical University of Budapest, and a member of the Hungarian Academy of Sciences.	IAU · 541571
541575 Mikhailnazarov	2011 SX_{247}	Mikhail A. Nazarov (1949–2016), a former head the Laboratory of Meteoritics at the Vernadsky Institute, Russian Academy of Sciences	IAU · 541575
541582 Tóthimre	2011 TZ_{5}	Imre Tóth (born 1957) is a Hungarian astronomer and planetary scientist, known for his research on the coma and nucleus of comets using observations made by the Hubble telescope.	IAU · 541582
541587 Paparó	2011 TG_{16}	Margit Paparó (born 1950), a Hungarian astronomer and an observer of pulsating variable stars. She has also discovered supernova SN 1976C.	IAU · 541587
541618 Magyaribéla	2011 UY_{125}	Béla Magyari (1949–2018) was a Hungarian pilot, aeronautical engineer, colonel in the Hungarian Air Force, member of the Hungarian Astronomical Association, president of the Hungarian Astronautical Society, and a backup cosmonaut of the Soyuz 36 mission, who also worked for the Hungarian Space Office.	IAU · 541618
541627 Halmospál	2011 UE_{155}	Paul Halmos (1916–2006) was a Hungarian-American mathematician.	IAU · 541627
541631 Kirbulychev	2011 UT_{172}	Kir Bulychev was a pen name of Igor Vsevolodovich Mozheiko (1934–2003), a Russian orientalist historian and a well-known science fiction writers	IAU · 541631
541691 Ranschburg	2011 VC_{3}	Jenő Ranschburg (1935–2011) was a Hungarian psychologist, writer, and science popularizer.	IAU · 541691
541741 Fado	2011 WD_{118}	Fado, a Portuguese musical genre with roots in historical music from urban Lisbon. Fado also translates to "destiny" or "fate" in English.	IAU · 541741
541776 Oláhkatalin	2011 YZ_{12}	Katalin Oláh (born 1948),0 a Hungarian astronomer at the Konkoly Observatory. Her research includes binary stars, as wells as the spots, the differential rotation, and the cycling activity of stars.	IAU · 541776
541801 Kendurkar	2011 YY_{65}	Malhar R. Kendurkar, Canadian observational astronomer based in Prince George, British Columbia.	IAU · 541801
541842 Amygreaves	2012 BF_{24}	Amy Greaves (born 2003), the granddaughter of British amateur astronomer Norman Falla, who discovered this minor planet.	IAU · 541842
541878 Jessicatallulah	2012 BX_{130}	Jessica Tallulah Jane Forward (born 2005), the granddaughter of British amateur astronomer Norman Falla, who discovered this minor planet.	IAU · 541878
541897 TRAPPIST	2012 CK	TRAPPIST (Transiting Planets and Planetesimals Small Telescopes) are two 0.6-meter robotic telescopes located at the La Silla Observatory in Chile and at the Oukaïmeden Observatory in Morocco used for searching for comets and exoplanets.	IAU · 541897
541982 Grendel	2012 FF_{87}	Lajos Grendel (1948–2018) was a Slovak-Hungarian writer and university teacher.	IAU · 541982
541983 Matthiaspenselin	2012 GN_{5}	Matthias Penselin (born 1963) is a German science teacher and astronomer.	IAU · 541983
541992 Lukácsbéla	2012 GE_{26}	Béla Lukács (born 1947) is a Hungarian theoretical physicist.	IAU · 541992
