= Babjak =

Babjak is a Slovak surname. Notable people with the surname include:

- Ján Babjak
- Jim Babjak (born 1957), American guitarist and banker
- Štefan Babjak (1931–2008), Slovak tenor, father of Martin
- Martin Babjak (born 1960), Slovak tenor
