= Martin Babjak =

Slovak operatic baritone (born 1960)

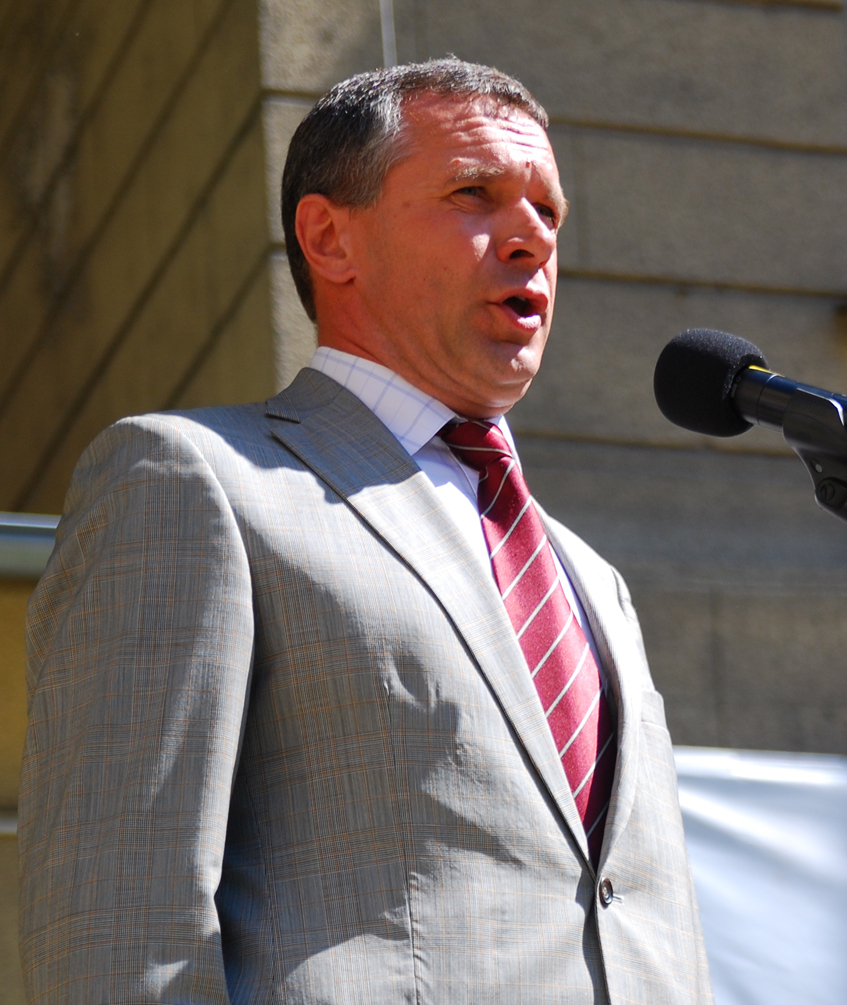
Martin Babjak

Martin Babjak (born 15 September 1960 in Banská Bystrica) is a Slovak operatic baritone. The winner of several international singing competitions, he has been a principal singer at the Slovak National Theatre since 1989. He has also appeared as a guest artist at opera houses in Germany, Austria, Switzerland, Spain, France, Norway, Egypt, Canada, the United States, Japan and the Czech Republic. He has particularly excelled in portraying roles from the operas of Wolfgang Amadeus Mozart, Giacomo Puccini, and Giuseppe Verdi.

== Biography ==
Born in Banská Bystrica, Babjak is the son of the Slovak baritone Štefan Babjak. His brother, Ján Babjak, is an operatic tenor and his sister, Terézia Kružliaková, is an operatic mezzo-soprano. He attended elementary school in Banská Bystrica. From 1976 to 1980 he studied at the Technical School in Zvolen. He then entered the Bratislava Conservatory where he studied under Idy Černecké. In 1984, he won first prize in the school's singing competition. After graduating in 1985, he pursued further studies at the L'Accademia di La Scala in Milan.

From 1987 to 1989, Babjak performed at the Divadlo Jozefa Gregora Tajovského in Zvolen. In 1988, he won second prize in the Mikuláš Schneider-Trnavský competition, Slovakia's national singing competition. In 1989, he joined the roster of principal singers at the Slovak National Theatre in Bratislava where he has remained ever since. In 1992, he won the Luciano Pavarotti International Voice Competition in Philadelphia which led to engagements to sing Marcello in Puccini's La bohème and King Alphonse in Gaetano Donizetti's La favorite at the Opera Company of Philadelphia. In 1995, he won the Totti dal Monte International Singing Competition in Treviso, Italy.

Among the many roles which Babjak has portrayed on the stage are Amonasro in Verdi's Aida, Count Almaviva in Mozart's The Marriage of Figaro, Count Danilo Danilovitsch in Franz Lehár's The Merry Widow, Escamillo in Georges Bizet's Carmen, Figaro in Gioachino Rossini's The Barber of Seville, Golaud in Claude Debussy's Pelléas et Mélisande, Guglielmo in Mozart's Così fan tutte, the Lord Duke of Nottingham in Donizetti's Roberto Devereux, Iago in Verdi's Otello, Mojmír in Eugen Suchoň's King Svätopluk, Rodrigue in Verdi's Don Carlos, Scarpia in Puccini's Tosca, Sharpless in Puccini's Madama Butterfly, Valentín in Charles Gounod's Faust, Wolfram in Richard Wagner's Tannhäuser and the title roles in Peter Ilyich Tchaikovsky's Eugene Onegin, Mozart's Don Giovanni, Verdi's Falstaff, Verdi's Nabucco and Verdi's Rigoletto.
