= Štefan Babjak =

Slovak singer (1931–2008)

Štefan Babjak (7 October 1931 in Humenné – 27 April 2008) was a Slovak classical baritone who had a lengthy career performing in operas, operettas, and musicals in his home country. Three of his five children, Martin Babjak, Ján Babjak, and Terézia Kružliaková, are professional opera singers.

Babjak was a member of the State Opera in Banská Bystrica from 1959 up until his death almost five decades later. He particularly excelled in portraying roles in operas by Giuseppe Verdi, including the Count di Luna in Il trovatore, Germont in La Traviata, Iago in Otello, Renato in Un ballo in maschera, Rodrigue in Don Carlos, and the title roles in Rigoletto and Simon Boccanegra. Other important roles for him included Caniche in Gejza Dusík's Modrá ruža, Escamillo in Georges Bizet's Carmen, Miško in Emmerich Kálmán's Die Csárdásfürstin, Stárek in Leoš Janáček's Jenůfa, Štelina in Eugen Suchoň's Krútňava, Valentín in Charles Gounod's Faust, Vodník in Antonín Dvořák's Rusalka, and the title roles in Peter Ilyich Tchaikovsky's Eugene Onegin and Alexander Borodin's Prince Igor. He also portrayed Alfred Doolittle in My Fair Lady and Horace in Hello, Dolly!.
