= List of sibling groups =

This is a list of groups of siblings who achieved notability together, whether in music, arts or other spheres of life.

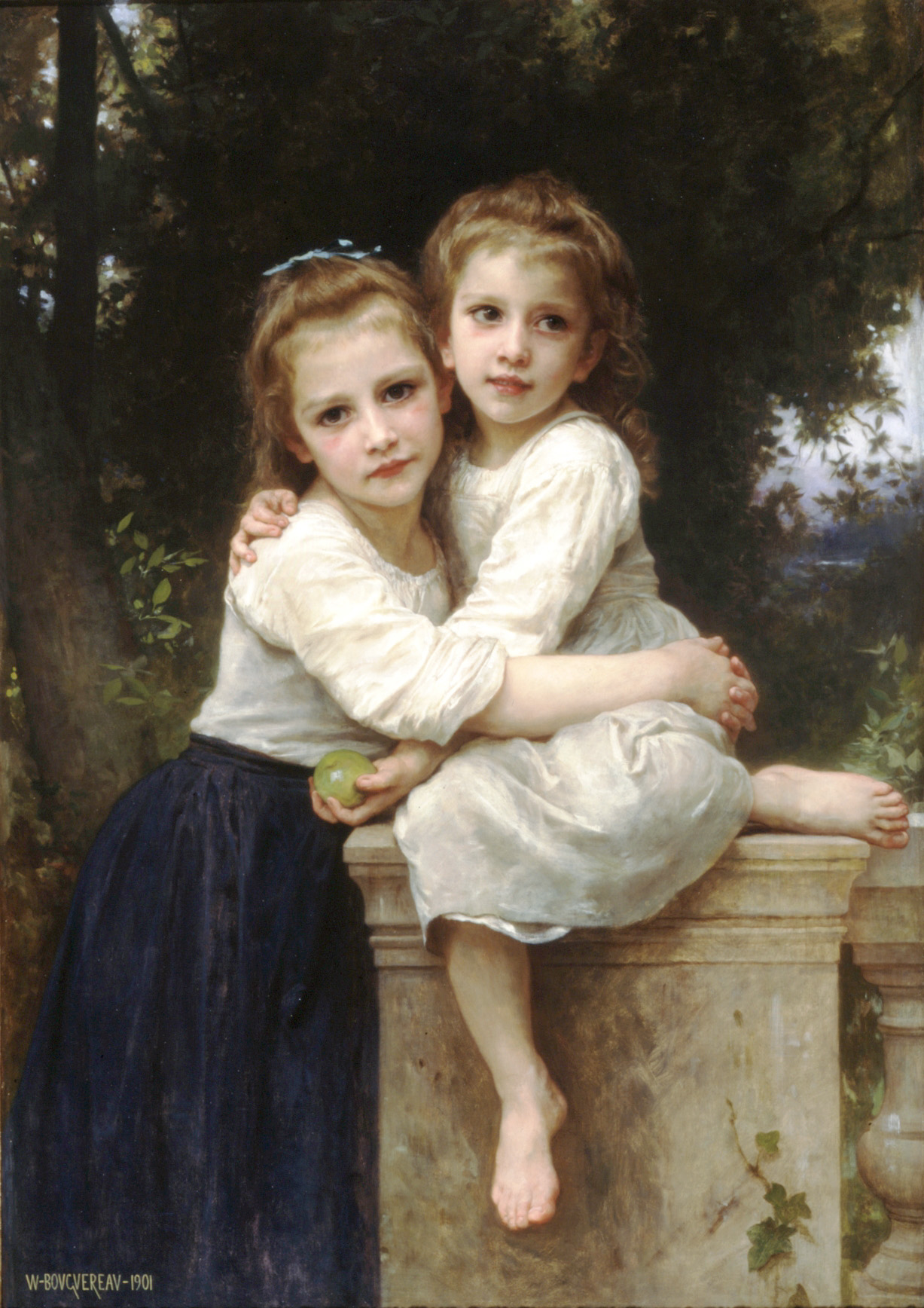
Two Sisters by William-Adolphe Bouguereau

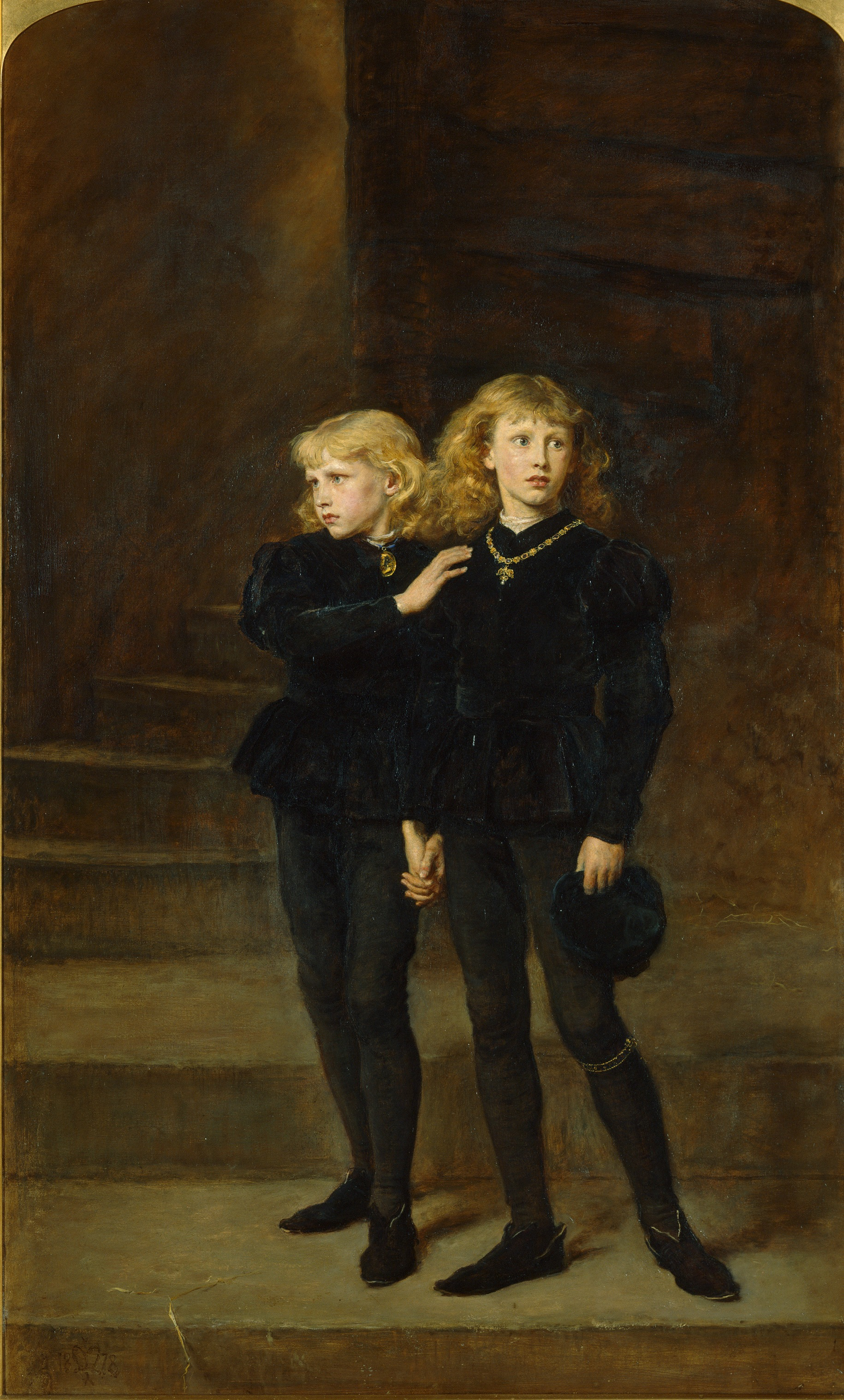
The Princes in the Tower by John Everett Millais, 1878. A painting of brothers Prince Edward V of England and Prince Richard of Shrewsbury, 1st Duke of York

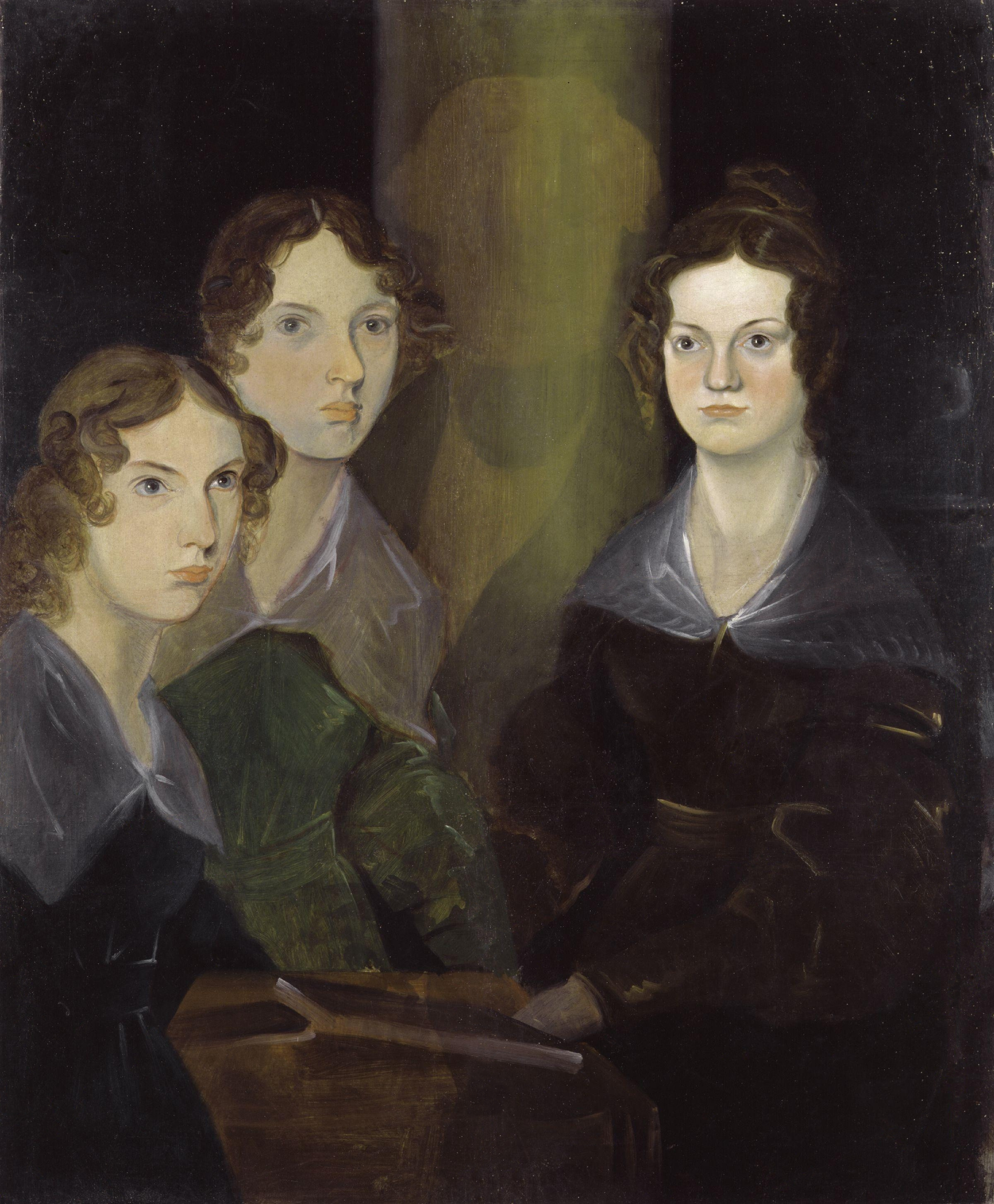
The Brontë sisters, painted by their brother

== Sibling musical groups ==
Some of these groups comprise only siblings; others were formed of siblings and their friends.

- 2:54, alternative rock band, consisting of sisters Colette and Hannah Thurlow
- 2 Brothers on the 4th Floor, a Dutch eurodance band with Martin and Bobby Boer
- 30 Seconds to Mars, an American rock band, Jared and Shannon Leto
- The 4 of Us, a rock band from Newry, County Down, Northern Ireland, best known outside Ireland for their output in the late 1980s and early 1990s
- 4 P.M. (For Positive Music), an American male R&B group best known for their cover version of "Sukiyaki"
- 4th Impact, a Filipina pop group consisting of sisters Almira, Irene, Celina and Mylene Cercado
- The "5" Royales, an American R&B vocal group that combined gospel, jump blues and doo-wop, marking an early and influential step in the evolution of rock and roll
- 77 Bombay Street, a Swiss folk rock musical group, which consists of four brothers Matt, Joe, Simri-Ramon and Esra Buchli
- 702, an American vocal girl group, with the final and most known line up consisting of Kameelah Williams and sisters Irish and LeMisha Grinstead
- 98 Degrees, an American pop and R&B vocal group whose founding member include brothers Nick and Drew Lachey
- ? and the Mysterians, American garage rock band from Saginaw, Michigan, Robert and Rudy Martinez aka ?
- A, an English rock band, Giles Perry and identical twins Jason and Adam Perry
- Abjeez, a Persian Alternative band, Safoura and Melody Safavi
- AC/DC, an Australian rock band, Malcolm and Angus Young
- The Aces, an American band with two sisters, Cristal Ramirez and Alisa Ramirez
- Ace of Base, a Swedish quartet that includes three Berggren siblings
- Addrisi Brothers, an American pop singing/songwriting duo from Winthrop, Massachusetts
- After 7, an American R&B group founded in 1987 by brothers Melvin & Kevon Edmonds, and Keith Mitchell
- AJR, an American, indie-pop band of brothers consisting of Adam Met, Jack Met, and Ryan Met
- Akdong Musician, a brother-sister K-pop duo
- Aleka's Attic, alternative band formed by River Phoenix and his sister Rain
- Alessi Brothers (aka Alessi), an American pop rock singer-songwriter duo Billy & Bobby Alessi (identical twins)
- The Alley Cats, vocal group from Los Angeles, California, with brothers Gary & Chester Pipkin
- The Allman Brothers Band, an American southern jam band led by Gregg Allman and Duane Allman
- Aly and AJ Michalka, sisters, known briefly as 78violet
- Alisha's Attic, an English pop duo, sisters Shelly Poole and Karen Poole
- Ames Brothers, a singing quartet from Malden, Massachusetts, who were particularly famous in the 1950s for their traditional pop music hits
- Anathema, an English band, formerly death-doom metal, later alternative rock, Daniel, Vincent, and Jamie Cavanagh; John and Lee Douglas
- And Also The Trees, an English post-punk band with poetic lyrics. Brothers Justin Jones and Simon Huw Jones
- The Andrews Sisters, an American close-harmony singing group, LaVerne Sophia, Maxene Angelyn, and Patricia "Patty" Marie Andrews
- The Angels, a New Jersey American girl group best known for their 1963 No. 1 hit single "My Boyfriend's Back"
- The Angels, Australian rock band that formed in 1974 in Adelaide as the Keystone Angels with John Brewster on rhythm guitar and backing vocals, his brother Rick Brewster on lead guitar and backing vocals.
- Angus & Julia Stone, an Australian brother-sister folk and indie pop group
- The Anointed Pace Sisters, American gospel group of 8 Pace sisters (Duranice, Phyllis, June, Melonda, Dejualii, Lydia, Latrice and Leslie) plus occasional member, sister LaShun Pace
- Appleton, Appleton were a Canadian musical duo consisting of the Appleton sisters. The sisters were better known as members of the girl group All Saints
- The Arbors, American pop vocal group, two sets of brothers, Tom and Scott Herrick, with twins Ed and Fred Farran
- Arcade Fire, Canadian indie rock band, Win and Will Butler
- Arch Enemy, a Swedish melodic death-metal band, Michael and Christopher Amott
- Architects, British rock band, twin brothers Dan and Tom Searle
- Atlantic Starr, an American band from White Plains, New York, who had a No. 1 hit "Always"
- The Avett Brothers, American folk band
- The Bachelors, a pop music group, originating from Dublin, Ireland, with brothers Con & Dec Cluskey
- Bachman-Turner Overdrive, Canadian rock band from Winnipeg Manitoba Randy, Tim, and Robbie Bachman
- Bad Brains rock band formed in Washington, D.C. in 1976 Earl and Paul Hudson aka H.R.
- The Band Perry, an American music group composed of siblings Kimberly, Reid, and Neil Perry
- The Bangles, American pop band with sisters Vicki and Debbi Peterson
- Barbarellas an Irish pop duo, consisting of twins Edele and Keavy Lynch
- The Barr Brothers, an indie folk band founded in Montreal, Quebec
- Bauhaus, English gothic band, David J. and Kevin Haskins
- Bay City Rollers, Scottish pop band, Alan (bass) and Derek (drums) Longmuir
- Beach Boys, an American rock band, Brian, Carl, and Dennis Wilson
- Bear Mountain, an alternative Canadian dance electronic group, with identical twins Ian and Greg Bevis
- Beau Coup, an American rock band from Cleveland, Ohio
- BeBe & CeCe Winans, American gospel music brother/sister duo
- The Bee Gees, a British–Australian harmonic pop group, Barry, Robin, and Maurice Gibb
- The Bellamy Brothers, an American country-rock band, David and Howard
- The Belle Brigade, American duo, Bobby and Ethan Gruska
- Belly, an alternative rock band formed in Rhode Island
- The Beu Sisters, a pop-rock girl group from the U.S. state of Florida, consisting of the sisters Candice, Christie and Danielle
- The B-52's, an American new wave band formed in Athens, Georgia, in 1976, Cindy and Ricky Wilson
- B4-4, a Canadian boy band with twins Ryan and Dan Kowarsky
- Biffy Clyro, a Scottish Rock Band, identical twins James and Ben Johnston
- Billie Eilish, American singer/songwriter and her brother Finneas O'Connell
- The Black Crowes, American rock band, Chris and Rich Robinson
- Blackfoot Sue, a British pop/rock band, formed in 1970 by the twin brothers Tom and David Farmer and Eddie Golga
- The Blasters, American rock band, Phil and Dave Alvin
- Bleached, punk rock band consisting of sisters Jennifer and Jessica Clavin
- The Blossoms, an oft-uncredited female backing vocal group whose original line-up included twin sisters Annette and Nanette Williams
- Blue, a Scottish pop rock band, formed in Glasgow in 1973
- The Blue Diamonds, an Indonesia-born Dutch vocal duo, brothers Ruud de Wolff and Riem de Wolff
- Blue October, Justin and Jeremy Furstenfeld
- Blue Öyster Cult, an American rock band, brothers Joe and Albert Bouchard.
- Blues Traveler, an American blues-rock band formed in Princeton, New Jersey. Chan (guitar) Kinchia's brother, Tad (bass), joined group in 1999.
- Boards of Canada, a Scottish electronic music duo consisting of brothers Mike Sandison and Marcus Eoin
- The Bobbettes, an American R&B girl group, sisters Jannie and Emma Pought
- The Bonnie Sisters, an American pop group
- Boo-Yaa T.R.I.B.E., an American hip-hop group, brothers Ted, Paul, Vincent, Donald, Danny, and Roscoe Devoux
- The Boswell Sisters, an American close harmony singing group, Martha, Connee and Helvetia "Vet" Boswell
- Boyfriend, South Korean boy band with identical twins, Jo Youngmin and Jo Kwangmin (commonly known as the 'Jo Twins')
- Brandi Carlile, an American alternative country and folk rock artist whose band and songwriters include the twins Tim and Phil Hanseroth
- The Braxtons, an American R&B girl group, sisters Toni, Tamar, Trina, Towanda, and Traci Braxton
- Breakfast Club, Pop-dance group from NYC, with brothers Dan & Ed Gilroy, best known for hit single "Right on Track"
- The Breeders, an American alternative rock band, identical twin sisters Kim and Kelley Deal
- Brecker Brothers, an American jazz fusion duo, Michael Brecker (saxophone) and Randy Brecker (trumpet)
- Brick & Lace, Jamaican dancehall/R&B (or reggae fusion) musical duo consisting of sisters Nyanda and Nailah Thorbourne
- Brix & the Extricated post punk band made up of former members of The Fall including Paul and Steve Hanley
- Broods, a New Zealand musical duo, consisting of lead vocalist Georgia Josiena Nott and older brother Caleb Allan Joseph Nott
- Bros, British band, Matt and Luke Goss
- The Brothers Comatose, a five-piece bluegrass band based out of San Francisco, California
- The Brothers Johnson, an American funk, Motown and R&B band consisting of brothers George and Louis E. Johnson
- Brothers Osborne, an American country music duo consisting of brothers T.J. Osborne and John Osborne
- The Browns, an American country and folk music vocal trio best known for their 1959 Grammy-nominated hit, "The Three Bells"
- B. T. Express, an American funk/disco group, that had a number of successful songs during the 1970s
- Buck-Tick, a Japanese visual kei band, Yutaka Higuchi (bass) and Toll Yagami (drums)
- The Burns Sisters, folk/pop/rock trio with a Celtic slant
- The BusBoys, R&B group from Los Angeles best known for their appearance in the 1982 film 48 Hrs.
- B*Witched, an Irish girl group consisting of twin sisters Edele and Keavy Lynch, Lindsay Armaou and Sinéad O'Carroll
- Café Tacuba, a Mexican band, Joselo and Quique Arroyo
- Cage The Elephant, an American rock band, Matt and Brad Shultz
- Cannibal & the Headhunters, an American vocal group from East Los Angeles best known for their hit single "Land of 1000 Dances"
- The Cannonball Adderley Quintet, American jazz group featuring Cannonball and Nat Adderley
- Cap'n Jazz, an American emo band, Tim and Mike Kinsella
- Cardiacs, English rock band, Tim and Jim Smith
- The Carpenters, American melodic pop duo, Karen and Richard Carpenter
- Cavalera Conspiracy, a Brazilian heavy metal supergroup, Max and Igor Cavalera
- The Chambers Brothers, an American soul band including George, Joe, Lester, and Willie Chambers
- Chancho en Piedra, a Chilean funk rock band, Pablo and Felipe Ilabaca
- Charlie Belle, an American indie pop band, Jendayi and Gyasi Bonds
- Charly Bliss, an American power pop band, Eva and Sam Hendricks
- Cheeky Girls, a Romanian pop music duo, Gabriela and Monica Irimia
- Cherryholmes
- Chevelle, an American rock trio, Pete, Sam and Joe Loeffler
- Chloe x Halle, a R&B sister duo.
- The Chicks formally Dixie Chicks, an American country music group, Martie Maguire and Emily Robison
- The Christians (band), a musical ensemble from Liverpool, England, originally featured three brothers, Garry, Roger, and Russell Christian
- Cimorelli, American a cappella singing group consisting of five sisters
- The Clancy Brothers, an influential Irish folk group that initially developed as a part of the American folk music revival
- The Clark Family Experience, an American country music band composed of six brothers
- The Clark Sisters, an American gospel vocal group consisting of five sisters
- Clefs of Lavender Hill, a rock vocal group from Miami, Florida, formed around the nucleus of brother and sister Travis and Coventry Fairchild
- Cleopatra, teen vocal trio originally based in Manchester, England with sisters Cleo, Yonah, and Zainam Higgins
- The Clingers, the first American girl rock group to play their own instruments
- Clipse, American hip-hop duo, brothers known as No Malice and Pusha T
- The Cramps, the short-lived original lineup included Pam "Balam" on drums the sister of guitarist Bryan Gregory
- CocoRosie, an American duo, sisters Bianca "Coco" and Sierra "Rosie" Casady
- Collective Soul, an American post-grunge band, Ed Roland and Dean Roland
- Consumed, an English Melodic Hardcore band, originally featuring brothers Steve and Mike Ford
- The Cooper Brothers, a Canadian southern rock band founded in Ottawa, Ontario, by brothers Brian & Dick Cooper and their long-time friend Terry King
- Cornelius Brothers & Sister Rose, a family soul singing group from Dania Beach, Florida, formed in 1970
- Cornershop, a British indie rock band featuring siblings Tjinder and Avtar Singh
- The Corrs, a Celtic folk rock band, Andrea, Sharon, Caroline, and Jim Corr
- The Corsairs, an American doo-wop ensemble from La Grange, North Carolina
- Cowboy Junkies, an alternative country and folk rock band, featuring siblings Michael Timmins (guitar), Peter Timmins (drums), and Margo Timmins (vocals)
- The Cowsills, an American popular music family band that includes siblings Bill, Bob, Paul, Barry, John, and Susan
- The Cranberries, an Irish alternative rock band formed in Limerick, Ireland in 1989 that included brothers Mike and Noel Hogan
- Creedence Clearwater Revival, an American rock band, John Fogerty and Tom Fogerty
- Crash Test Dummies, a pop-rock group from Winnipeg, Manitoba
- The Crew-Cuts, a Canadian vocal quartet, that made a number of popular records that charted in the United States and worldwide in the mid-1950s
- The Cribs, indie rock band, identical twins Gary and Ryan Jarman, and younger brother Ross
- Crowded House, an Australian pop band including brother Neil and Tim Finn.
- Cherie and Marie Currie, American rock band, consisting of the eponymous identical twin singer/songwriters
- Da Youngsta's, an American hip-hop trio from Philadelphia, Pennsylvania, that consisted of brothers Taji "Taj Mahal" Goodman & Qu'ran "Q-Ball" Goodman and their cousin Tarik "Reek Geez" Dawson
- Dandelion, an alternative rock band from Philadelphia, Pennsylvania, formed in 1989
- Danny Wilson, a Scottish pop group formed in Dundee, Scotland, best known for its 1988 UK number 3 hit single "Mary's Prayer"
- Dark New Day, an American hard rock band, Clint and Corey Lowery
- The Darkness, an English rock band, Justin and Dan Hawkins
- The Dear Hunter, an American progressive rock band, Nick and Casey Crescenzo
- Death proto-punk band formed in Detroit as a funk band 1971 by brothers Bobby (bass, vocals), David (guitar), and Dannis (drums) Hackney
- DeBarge, an American R&B music group composed of brothers Mark, Randy, El, Bobby, James, and sister Bunny
- The DeCastro Sisters, a female vocal trio from Cuba originally consisted of sisters Peggy, Cherie & Babette DeCastro
- Deep Blue Something, an American rock band who are best known for their 1995 hit single "Breakfast at Tiffany's"
- The DeJohn Sisters, an American vocal duo, Julie & Dux DeJohn (born DiGiovanni)
- The DeFranco Family, a 1970s pop music group consisting entirely of siblings
- Deicide, American death metal band, Eric and Brian Hoffman
- The Del Fuegos, a 1980s garage rock band with brothers Warren Zanes & Dan Zanes
- The Delfonics, an American R&B/soul vocal group, brothers Wilbert and William Hart
- Delta Rae, an American folk rock band from Durham, North Carolina, including three siblings Ian, Eric, and Brittany Hölljes
- The Detroit Emeralds, R&B vocal group from Little Rock, Arkansas, originally composed of four brothers, Ivory, Abrim, Cleophus & Raymond Tilmon
- Devo, an American new-wave band, Mark and Bob Mothersbaugh, with Gerald and Bob Casale
- The Dils, American punk rock band from California, founded and fronted by brothers Chip and Tony Kinman
- Dire Straits, a British rock band, Mark and David Knopfler
- Disclosure, a British Electro-pop band, Howard and Guy Lawrence
- Dis-n-Dat, R&B duo of sisters Tishea (Dis) & Tenesia (Dat) Bennett
- The Dixie Cups, a girl group, with sisters Barbara Ann & Rosa Lee Hawkins and their cousin Joan Marie Johnson, who had a No. 1 hit "Chapel of Love" in 1964
- Dr. Buzzard's Original Savannah Band, a 1970s big band- and swing-influenced disco band, formed in the Bronx, New York

The Dooleys, an accomplished and successful English pop group of three sisters, three brothers and two non-family members. Sold over19 million records. 1967 - 1992.

- The Dorsey Brothers, an American jazz group fronted by Tommy and Jimmy
- Doves, a British alternative rock band, Jez and Andy Williams
- The Dreamlovers, an American doo-wop group from Philadelphia, Pennsylvania best known for their 1961 hit "When We Get Married"
- Earth and Fire, a Dutch rock and pop band formed by twin brothers Chris and Gerard Koerts
- Earth, Wind & Fire, an American band that has spanned the musical genres of R&B, soul, funk, jazz, disco, pop, rock, dance, Latin, and Afro pop
- Echosmith, an American indie pop band composed of four siblings
- Eighth Wonder, an English pop band, brother Jamie and sister Patsy Kensit
- Elusion, a female R&B group that consisted of two separate sets of identical twin sisters
- Embrace, a British Britpop band, Danny and Richard McNamara
- The Emotions, an American R&B group, founded by sisters Sheila, Wanda and Jeanette Hutchinson, with sister Pamela later replacing Jeanette
- The Equals, a British rock group, with twin brothers, best remembered for their 1968 hit "Baby, Come Back"
- Eruption, a techno-funk-dance group of Jamaican natives based in London, best known for their cover of "I Can't Stand the Rain"
- Esme Emerson, an English music duo consisting of sister and brother Esme and Emerson Lee-Scott
- Eternal, British R&B group successful in the 1990s, sisters Easther and Vernie Bennett
- Evan and Jaron, Pop-rock duo of identical twin brothers Evan Lowenstein & Jaron Lowenstein
- The Everly Brothers, an American country-influenced band, Philip and Isaac Donald Everly
- Every Mother's Son, an American sunshine pop band formed in New York City, best known for their 1967 Top 10 hit "Come On Down to My Boat"
- Every Time I Die, an American metalcore band, brothers Jordan and Keith Buckley
- The Fall some lineups included Paul and Steve Hanley
- The Family Rain, an English blues-rock band, brothers William, Ollie and Timothy Walter
- Fanny, an American all-female band, June Millington and Jean Millington
- The Faragher Brothers, a soft rock family musical group from California consisting originally of brothers Tommy, Davey, Jimmy & Danny Faragher
- Felice Brothers, American folk rock band, brothers Ian, James and Simone Felice
- Felony, an American new wave and rock band formed in Los Angeles, California, in the early 1970s by brothers Jeff & Joe Spry
- The Fergies, Australian folk/indie/pop/rock band consisting of siblings Daniel, Shani, Nathan, Joel, and Kahlia Ferguson
- Field Music, English indie pop/rock band consisting of brothers David and Peter Brewis
- The Fiery Furnaces, an American indie rock band, siblings Matthew Friedberger and Eleanor Friedberger
- First Aid Kit, a Swedish folk duo, sisters Klara and Johanna Söderberg
- The Five Keys, an American R&B vocal group, initially consisting of two sets of brothers, that was instrumental in shaping this genre in the 1950s
- Five Man Electrical Band, a Canadian rock group from Ottawa, Ontario, best known for their 1971 hit single "Signs"
- The Five Stairsteps, an American R&B band composed of 5 brothers Clarence Burke Jr., Keni Burke, James Burke, Dennis Burke, Cubie Burke and their eldest sister, Alohe Burke.
- Five Star, a British pop group, formed in 1983 and comprising siblings Stedman, Lorraine, Denise, Doris and Delroy Pearson
- The Flames, a musical rock group from Durban in South Africa featuring the Fataar brothers
- The Flirtations, an all-female musical group who have recorded since the early 1960s
- The Floaters, an American R&B vocal group, from Detroit, Michigan, best known for their 1977 song "Float On"
- A Flock of Seagulls, an English new wave and synth-pop band originally formed in 1979 in Liverpool, England
- The Frogs rock music band founded in 1980, in Milwaukee, Wisconsin, by brothers Jimmy and Dennis Flemion
- The Fontane Sisters, a trio (Bea, Geri and Marge Rosse) from New Milford, New Jersey
- The Fools, a Massachusetts rock band best known for the party atmosphere of their live performances and tongue-in-cheek original songs, covers and parodies
- Force MDs, an American R&B vocal group that was formed in 1981 in Staten Island, New York, considered major forerunners of the new jack swing movement
- The Forester Sisters, an American country music vocal group consisting of sisters Kathy, June, Kim, and Christy Forester
- For King & Country (band), a Christian pop duo comprising brothers Luke and Joel Smallbone
- The Four Cohans, an American vaudeville act featuring George M. Cohan and Josie Cohan Niblo
- The Four Coins, a vocal group from Canonsburg, Pennsylvania, who had five Top 40 singles in the 1950s
- The Four King Cousins, an American pop vocal group, Tina Cole and sister Cathy Cole Green with their cousins Carolyn Cameron and Candy Brand
- The Four Freshmen, Jazz-styled, vocal/instrumental group from Indianapolis, Indiana, who had a top 20 hit "Graduation Day" in 1956
- The Frank And Walters, an Irish indie pop, brothers Paul and Niall Linehan
- The Free Movement, an American R&B vocal group from Los Angeles, best known for their 1971 Top 10 single, "I've Found Someone of My Own"
- The Free Design, an American vocal group from the 1960s and 1970s
- Frost Children, an American pop duo of siblings Angel and Lulu Prost from St. Louis, Missouri
- Further, a 1990s American indie rock band from Southern California, featuring brothers Brent and Darren Rademaker.
- The Gap Band, an American R&B group fronted by brothers Charlie, Robert, and Ronnie Wilson
- The Garden, duo from Orange County, California consisting of twins Wyatt and Fletcher Shears
- Gardiner Sisters, a Canadian-American close-harmony acoustic pop singer/songwriter group, Hailey, Allie, Mandi, Lindsay, Abby, and Lucy Gardiner
- Gary and the Hornets, was a Franklin, Ohio–based garage rock band that consisted of three brothers: Gary, Greg, and Steve Calvert
- The G-Clefs, an American R&B vocal group, brothers Teddy, Chris, Tim and Arnold Scott
- Gene Loves Jezebel, British alternative rock band with identical twin brothers, Jay and Michael Aston
- Gentle Giant, British progressive rock band active in the 1970s, with core members including brothers Phil, Derek and Ray Shulman
- Gerry and the Pacemakers, an English beat group prominent in the 1960s Merseybeat scene
- Gibson Brothers, disco group originating from Martinique and comprising brothers Alex, Chris and Patrick Gibson.
- Gojira, French metal band, vocalist/guitarist Joe and drummer Mario DuPlantier
- Good Charlotte, an American pop punk band, identical twins Joel and Benji Madden
- Good Question, an R&B and dance music vocal duo from Philadelphia, Pennsylvania, composed of brothers Sean and Marc Douglas
- The Goossens family, grandfather and father were conductors, five children were all professional musician: Eugène (conductor/composer), Léon (oboe), Marie and Sidonie (both harpists), Adolphe (French horn).
- Grapefruit, psychedelic rock group from England in the late 1960s
- The Greenwood County Singers, Folk group from Los Angeles, California, consisting of seven men and two women (brothers Carson Parks & Van Dyke Parks were members)
- Greta Van Fleet, an American Rock band formed in 2012, Josh, Jake, and Sam Kiszka
- The Grimson family, a father and seven children who were all active classical musicians (piano and strings). They flourished in London from the early 1870s.
- Guy, an American hip hop, R&B and soul group founded in Harlem, New York, in 1987, Aaron and Damion Hall
- The Haden Triplets, American bluegrass/country trio, triplet sisters Petra, Rachel and Tanya Haden
- Haim, sisters Este, Danielle and Alana Haim
- Halestorm, an American hard rock band, Arejay and Lzzy Hale
- Half Japanese, American art punk band, Jad and David Fair
- Hamilton Sisters, Pearl and Violet of the Three X Sisters harmony trio
- Hanson, an American pop rock band, Isaac, Taylor, and Zac Hanson
- Happy Mondays, an English rock band, brothers Shaun and Paul Ryder
- The Harden Trio, an American country music group, siblings Bobby Harden and his sisters, Robbie and Arlene
- Heart, an American rock band, Ann and Nancy Wilson
- Heatwave, a UK based funk/disco band that featured American brothers Johnnie Wilder Jr. and Keith Wilder
- Hermanos Gutiérrez, a latin instrumental band formed in Zürich, featuring brothers Estevan and Alejandro Gutiérrez
- The Hesitations, an American R&B group from Cleveland, Ohio, with brothers George "King" Scott & Charles Scott
- High Inergy, a late 1970s American R&B and soul girl group best known for their hit, "You Can't Turn Me Off (In the Middle of Turning Me On)"
- Highly Suspect, an American rock trio, founded by twin brothers Rich and Ryan Meyer
- The Hillside Singers, an American folk group assembled to sing "I'd Like to Teach the World to Sing (In Perfect Harmony)" for a television commercial
- The Hives, Swedish rock Band, Pelle and Niklas Almqvist
- The Honeycombs, English 1960s pop group best known for the single "Have I the Right?". Included siblings John and Anne "Honey" Lantree
- Hot Chelle Rae, an American pop rock group, their longest lineup including brothers Ryan and Jamie Follesé, and are best known for the 2011 song "Tonight Tonight"
- H-Town, an American R&B vocal group from Houston, Texas, United States founded in 1990 by twin brothers Keven "Dino" Conner, Solomon “Shazam" Conner and their longtime friend Darryl "GI" Jackson
- The Hudson Brothers, an American musical group formed in Portland, Oregon, consisting of brothers Bill Hudson, Brett Hudson and Mark Hudson
- Ibeyi, an Afro-French Cuban musical duo consisting of twin sisters Lisa-Kaindé Diaz and Naomi Diaz
- The Impressions, an American music group originally formed in 1958 whose line-up included brothers Richard & Arthur Brooks until 1962
- In the Nursery, English martial industrial band, consisting of twin brothers Klive and Nigel Humberstone
- Instant Funk, an American 1970s and 1980s disco band, brothers Kim and Scotty Miller
- INXS, Australian rock band, Tim, Andrew, and Jon Farriss
- IV Xample, a 1990s American vocal quartet from Los Angeles who and are best remembered for their 1995 single "I'd Rather Be Alone"
- Isley Brothers, American pop (soul) band, O'Kelly, Rudolph, Ernie, Marvin, and Ronald Isley
- The Jackson 5, an American popular music family group, Jackie, Tito, Jermaine (later replaced by Randy), Marlon, and Michael Jackson
- Jagged Edge, an American R&B group whose members include identical twin lead singers Brandon and Brian Casey
- Jan & Kjeld, a Danish musical duo of brothers Jan and Kjeld Wennick
- Japan, English band, brothers David Sylvian and Steve Jansen
- The Jazz Brothers, American jazz group, featuring Chuck and Gap Mangione
- Jedward, an Irish musical duo of identical twins who represented their country in the Eurovision Song Contest in 2011 and 2012
- The Jelly Beans, a rhythm and blues vocal group from Jersey City, New Jersey, formed in 1962 by five high schoolers
- Jellyfish, an American rock band formed in San Francisco in 1989 whose line-up included brothers Roger & Chris Manning
- The Jesus and Mary Chain, Scottish noise band, Jim and William Reid
- Jet, Australian rock band, Nic and Chris Cester
- The Jets, an America pop band, LeRoy, Haiti, Rudy, Kathi, Elizabeth and Moana Wolfgramm, and adopted siblings Eddie Lavatai and Eugene Hunt
- Jo Jo Gunne, an American rock band with brothers Mark & Matt Andes
- Jocelyn and Chris Arndt, an American blues-rock band
- Jodeci, an American R&B quartet comprising two brother duos
- The Johnstons, an Irish folk band, sisters Adrienne and Lucy Johnston
- Jonas Brothers, an American pop rock band, Kevin, Joe, and Nick Jonas
- The Jones Girls, an American R&B vocal trio of sisters Brenda, Shirley and Valorie Jones
- The Jordan Brothers, an American musical group of brothers Joseph, Frank, Robert, and Lewis Jordan
- Jump5, an American dance-pop group active in contemporary Christian music from 1999 to 2007
- The Justin Holt Band, a country band from Alabama, Vocals/Acoustic Gtr Justin Holt, Drummer Johnny Holt
- Kalin Twins, a pop music recording and songwriting duo comprising twin brothers Harold Kalin and Herbert Kalin
- Kalmah, a Finnish melodic death metal band, Pekka and Antti Kokko
- The Mary Kaye Trio, an American musical group, Mary Kaye and her brother Norman Kaye
- Killing Heidi, an Australian rock band formed in 1996, featuring siblings Ella Hooper (lead vocals) and Jesse Hooper (lead guitar)
- The Knife, a Swedish electronic music duo from Gothenburg formed in 1999, consisting of siblings Karin and Olof Dreijer
- The King Sisters, an American Grammy nominated vocal group, Yvonne, Alyce, Luise and Marilyn King
- Kings of Leon, an American rock band, Caleb, Nathan, and Jared Followill
- Kings of the Sun, hard rock group from Sydney, Australia, with brothers Jefferey & Clifford Hoad
- The Kinks, an English rock band, Ray and Dave Davies
- The Kinleys, an American country music duo composed of identical twin sisters Heather and Jennifer Kinley
- Mac and Katie Kissoon, a male and female vocal duo, consisting of brother and sister Mac & Katie Kissoon
- Kitty, Daisy & Lewis, British band fronted by siblings of the Durham family
- Klique, an American R&B trio, consisting of Howard Huntsberry, Isaac Suthers and his sister, Deborah Suthers
- The Knickerbockers, an American rock band, formed in Bergenfield, New Jersey, who are best remembered for their 1965 Beatles sound-alike hit single "Lies"
- Gladys Knight & the Pips, an R&B/soul family musical act from Atlanta, Georgia, that remained active on the music charts and performing circuit for three decades
- Kongos, South-African born American alternative rock band, Daniel, Dylan, Jesse, and Johnny Kongos
- Kool & the Gang, an American band formed in Jersey City, New Jersey, in 1964 by brothers Robert "Kool" Bell and Ronald Bell
- K's Choice, a Belgian rock band from Antwerp, core members are siblings Sam Bettens and Gert Bettens
- LaRue, an American Christian music band formed by siblings Phillip and Natalie LaRue.
- The La's, an English rock band from Liverpool, fronted by singer, songwriter and guitarist Lee Mavers
- Las Ketchup, a Spanish girl group of sisters, best known for the 2002 hit single, "The Ketchup Song (Aserejé)"
- Lamb of God, an American metal band, Will and Chris Adler
- Lanier & Co., an American R&B-soul-funk band, Farris Lanier, Jr. and his brothers Marlon and Fenoye
- Larkin Poe, an American roots rock band, sisters Rebecca and Megan Lovell
- Lawrence, an American soul-pop band led by Clyde and Gracie Lawrence
- Len, Canadian alternative rock band, Marc Costanzo and Sharon Costanzo
- The Lemon Twigs, an American rock band duo from Long Island, New York, fronted by brothers Brian and Michael D'Addario
- The Lennon Sisters, an American pop vocal group, Dianne, Peggy, Kathy, Janet, and Mimi Lennon
- Level 42, an English jazz-funk band, brothers Boon Gould and Phil Gould
- LeVert, an American R&B group, consisting of brothers Gerald and Sean Levert
- Lijadu Sisters, Nigerian jazz/disco band, identical twins Taiwo and Kehinde Lijadu
- Lily & Madeleine, American folk pop band consisting of sisters Lily and Madeleine Jurkiewicz
- Limmie & Family Cookin', an American family pop group from Canton, Ohio
- Lit, an American rock band formed in Orange County, California, best known for their 1999 song "My Own Worst Enemy"
- Los Bunkers, a Chilean rock band, Mauricio and Francisco Durán, with Álvaro and Gonzalo López
- Los Indios Tabajaras, a guitar duo of two brothers, Antenor Lima and Natalicio (Nato) Lima, from Ceará in the Northeast of Brazil
- Los Jaivas, a Chilean progressive-rock-andino band, Eduardo, Claudio and Gabriel Parra
- Los Lonely Boys, the Garza brothers – vocalist/guitarist Henry, bassist/vocalist Jojo, and drummer/ vocalist Ringo
- The Lost Generation, an American soul group from Chicago, Illinois with brothers Lowrell Simon & Fred Simon
- The Louvin Brothers, American duo, Ira and Charlie Louvin
- The Love Generation, an American pop rock band from the 1960s founded by brothers John Bahler and Tom Bahler
- Love Like Blood, German gothic rock/metal band, with brothers Yorck and Gunnar Eysel
- Love Spit Love, an alternative rock band founded in 1992 by singer Richard Butler during the 1990s hiatus of the Psychedelic Furs
- Love Unlimited, a female vocal trio that included Barry White's future wife, Glodean James, her sister, Linda James, and their cousin Diane Taylor
- Lovehammers, an American rock band, Dino and Bobby Kourelis
- The Lovelites, an American vocal group, based in Chicago, originally composed of the sisters Patti Hamilton and Rozena Petty plus their friend, Barbara Peterman
- L.T.D., an American R&B/funk band best known for their 1977 hit single, "(Every Time I Turn Around) Back in Love Again"
- The Maccabees, British indie rock band, brothers Felix, Hugo, and Will White
- Madina Lake, an American rock band, identical twins Nathan and Matthew Leone
- Madsen (band), a German punk rock band, brothers Sebastian, Sascha, and Johannes Madsen
- The Magic Numbers, an English rock band, Angela and Sean Gannon with Michele and Romeo Stodart
- The Marshall Tucker Band, an American rock band from Spartanburg, South Carolina, that helped establish the Southern rock genre in the early 1970s
- Mason Proffit, an American Country Rock group formed by brothers Terryry and John Michael Talbot
- The McCoys, a rock group formed in Union City, Indiana, best known for their 1965 #1 single "Hang on Sloopy"
- The McCrarys, an American family Gospel and R&B group best known for their 1978 single "You"
- Kate & Anna McGarrigle, a duo of Canadian singer-songwriters from Quebec
- The McGuire Sisters, a singing trio, composed of three sisters, in American popular music
- Meat Puppets, an American rock band formed in January 1980 in Phoenix, Arizona, with Curt Kirkwood, his brother Cris Kirkwood, and Derrick Bostrom
- Mel and Kim, a British pop duo, consisting of sisters Melanie Appleby & Kim Appleby
- Melim, a Brazilian R&B group formed by Rodrigo, Gabriela and Diogo
- Melky Sedeck, a Haitian-American R&B duo formed by Blandinna Melky Jean and Farel Sedeck Guerschom Jean (a younger sister and younger brother of hip-hop star Wyclef Jean)
- Men Without Hats, a Canadian new wave and synth-pop band, originally from Montreal, Quebec
- Midi, Maxi & Efti, a Swedish musical group, with African influences, consisted of the two twin sisters Midi and Maxi Berhanu and their friend Freweyni "Efti" Teclehaimanot
- Midnight Star, R&B dance group formed at Kentucky State University in 1976 whose most successful line-up included brothers Reginald Calloway & Vincent Calloway
- Milburn, an indie rock band from Sheffield, England, that consisted of Joe Carnall, Louis Carnall, Tom Rowley, and Joe Green
- The Mills Brothers, an American Vocal Harmony Group, John, Herbert, Harry and Donald
- Ming and Ping, American synthpop duo, with Hong Kong-born identical twins
- The Miracles, an American R&B vocal group that was the first successful recording act for Motown Records, and one of the most important & influential groups of the 1960s
- Misery Signals, an American hardcore band, Brandon and Ryan Morgan
- The Misfits, American horror-punk band, Jerry Only and Doyle Wolfgang von Frankenstein (brothers)
- Mocedades, Spanish singing group, Amaya, Izaskun, and Estibaliz Uranga
- The Moffatts, a Canadian pop/rock band, Scott and triplets Bob, Clint, and Dave. The fraternal twins Bob and Clint later formed a duo called Same Same.
- The MonaLisa Twins, are a pop rock band, fronted by twin-sister singer-songwriters Mona Wagner (vocals, rhythm guitar, percussion, harmonica, flute, recorder) and Lisa Wagner (vocals, lead guitar, ukulele, cello) - noted for acoustic versions of 1960's and '70's hits with two part vocal harmonies.
- Mother Mother, a Canadian indie rock band, Ryan and Molly Guldemond
- Mulberry Lane, a pop music vocal group from Omaha, Nebraska, consisting of the Rizzuto sisters, Heather, Rachel, Allie, and Jaymie Jones
- The Murder Junkies, last backing band for GG Allin his brother Merle Allin the bassist continued the group after his death with other singers.
- The Murmaids, an American one-hit wonder all-female vocal trio composed of sisters Carol & Terry Fischer and Sally Gordon
- Musical Youth, a British Jamaican reggae band formed in 1979 in Birmingham, England, best remembered for their successful 1982 single "Pass the Dutchie"
- My Chemical Romance, an American rock band, Mikey and Gerard Way
- Naked Brothers Band, an American rock band Alex and Nat Wolff
- The National, an American rock band, Bryce and Aaron Dessner (identical twins) with Scott and Bryan Devendorf
- Nazia and Zoheb, were a Pakistani Pop group, Nazia Hassan, Zoheb Hassan
- Nelson, an American Rock Band, identical twins Matthew and Gunnar Nelson
- New Kids on the Block, (NKOTB), an American boy band from Dorchester, Massachusetts comprising brothers Jonathan and Jordan Knight, Joey McIntyre, Donnie Wahlberg and Danny Wood
- The Newbeats, an American popular music vocal trio, Larry Henley & Mathis brothers, best known for their 1964 hit "Bread and Butter"
- The Neville Brothers, an American R&B group from New Orleans, Aaron, Art, Cyril and Charles
- Nickelback, a Canadian rock band formed in 1995 in Hanna, Alberta, Canada, whose members include brothers Chad & Mike Kroeger
- Nina Sky, an American musical duo consisting of identical twins Nicole and Natalie Albino. Best known for their 2004 debut single "Move Ya Body" which reached number four on the Billboard Hot 100.
- No Doubt, an American rock band, Gwen and Eric Stefani
- No Mercy, a male techno-dance trio with twin brothers Ariel and Gabriel Hernández
- No Name, a Slovak pop/rock band, Igor, Roman, Dušan and Ivan Timko
- The Nolans, an Irish/English family music group, Bernie, Anne, Maureen, Linda, Coleen, and Denise
- NRBQ, an American rock band whose members included brothers Joey and Johnny Spampinato
- Oasis, an English rock band, Liam and Noel Gallagher
- Obituary, American death metal band, John and Donald Tardy
- October Tide, a Swedish metal band, Fredrik and Mattais Norrman
- The Okee Dokee Brothers, an independent American bluegrass and American roots children's music duo from Minneapolis
- Olsen Brothers, Danish pop-rock duo
- Orbital, English electronic music duo, brothers Phil and Paul Hartnoll
- Orleans, an American pop-rock group formed in Woodstock, New York, that included brothers Larry and Lance Hoppen
- The Osborne Brothers, an influential and popular bluegrass act during the 1960s and 70s, best known for their 1967 country hit song "Rocky Top"
- The Osmonds, an American family music group, Alan, Wayne, Merrill, Jay, Donny, Marie, and Jimmy Osmond
- The Other Ones, a pop rock band which formed in Berlin in 1984 with Alf Klimek and twins Jayney Klimek and Johnny Klimek
- The Pagans, punk band formed in Cleveland in 1974, Brian and Mike Hudson
- Palaye Royale, an American rock band, Sebastian Danzig, Remington Leith and Emerson Barrett
- Pantera, an American heavy metal band, Dimebag Darrell and Vinnie Paul Abbott
- Paramore, an American rock band, Josh and Zac Farro
- Parquet Courts, an American rock band, Andy and Max Savage
- The Pasadenas, a British R&B/pop group with twins Mike and David Milliner
- Pastilla, a U.S. based Latin Alternative Rock band, Victor "Chicles" Monroy and Adrian Monroy
- Patience and Prudence, two sisters who were a young vocal duo active from 1956 to 1964
- People!, an American rock band, Geoff Levin and Robb Levin
- Pernice Brothers, an American indie rock band, Joe and Bob Pernice
- The Peppermint Rainbow, an American sunshine pop group from Baltimore, Maryland, with sisters Bonnie and Patty Lamdin
- Peppermint Trolley Company, an American sunshine pop band, with brothers Danny and Jimmy Faragher, known for their 1968 single "Baby You Come Rollin' 'Cross My Mind"
- The Pierces, an American folk-pop band, Allison and Catherine Pierce
- Pierce the Veil, an American experimental post-hardcore band, Vic and Mike Fuentes
- Pleasure, R&B group from Portland, Oregon whose core members include brothers Donald and Michael Hepburn
- The Pleasure Seekers Detroit all-female band which became Cradle. Formed by Suzi Quatro and included at various times her sisters Nancy, Arlene and Patti.
- Plumtree, a Canadian indie rock/power pop band with sisters Carla and Lynette Gillis. They now perform in the rock band SISTER (now known as Overnight) and also perform in Bells Clanging.
- P.M. Dawn, an American hip hop and R&B act formed in 1988 by the brothers Attrell Cordes and Jarrett Cordes in Jersey City, New Jersey
- P.S. Eliot, American pop punk band from Birmingham, Alabama, consisting of sisters Katie and Allison Crutchfield
- Promises, A Canadian band with sister Leslie Maria Knauer and brothers, Jed Knauer and Benny Knauer
- The Pointer Sisters, an American R&B group, Ruth, Anita, Bonnie, June
- Ponderosa Twins Plus One, an American soul vocal group formed in 1970 in Cleveland, Ohio featuring two sets of identical twins: Alfred & Alvin Pelham and Keith & Kirk Gardner
- The Proclaimers, a Scottish vocal band, twins Charlie Reid and Craig Reid
- The Psychedelic Furs, English rock band, Richard (singer) and Tim Butler (bass guitar)
- The Puppies, a child hip hop duo composed of brother and sister Calvin "Big Boy" Mills III and Tamara Dee Mills
- Quarteto em Cy, a Brazilian girl group originally composed of four sisters hailing from Ibirataia, a town located in the Brazilian state of Bahia: Cybele, Cylene, Cynara and Cyva
- Radiohead, an English alternative rock band, Jonny and Colin Greenwood
- The Rainy Daze, a psychedelic pop group formed in Denver, Colorado in 1965 that included brothers Tim and Kip Gilbert
- The Ramrods, an American instrumental pop group formed in 1956 by Claire Lane (born Claire Litke) and her brother Rich Litke
- The Ran-Dells, Rock & roll trio from Villas, New Jersey, that included brothers Steve and Robert Rappaport and their cousin John Spirt
- R5, an American pop rock band formed in Los Angeles in 2009
- Randy & the Rainbows, an American doo-wop group from Maspeth, New York, that featured two pairs of siblings, along with a fifth member
- Rank and File, American country rock band formed in Austin, Texas, founded by brothers Chip and Tony Kinman, previously of The Dils
- Raven, an English heavy metal band, formed in 1974 by the Gallagher brothers, bassist and vocalist John and guitarist Mark
- Raybon Brothers, a country duo from Sanford, Florida, consisting of brothers Marty Raybon and Tim Raybon
- Redbone, a Native American rock and soul band, founded by brothers Pat and Lolly Vegas
- Redd Kross, American alternative rock band from Hawthorne, California, founded by brothers Jeff and Steve McDonald
- The Reddings, an American funk, soul and disco band, founded by Otis Redding's sons Dexter and Otis Redding III, together with Mark Lockett
- The Replacements, American rock band from Minneapolis consisting of brothers Bob and Tommy Stinson
- Right Said Fred, a London-based English band formed by brothers Fred and Richard Fairbrass in 1989
- The Roches, an Irish-American trio of singing songwriting sisters, Maggie, Terre, and Suzzy Roche
- The Rocky Fellers, a Filipino-born pop/rock band composed of four brothers: Tony, Junior, Eddie and Albert Maligmat, and their father, Doroteo "Moro" Maligmat
- The Ronettes, an American girl group from New York City with lead singer Veronica Bennett (Ronnie Spector), her older sister Estelle Bennett, and their cousin Nedra Talley
- The Rowans, an American country-rock group, originally formed by the brothers Chris and Lorin Rowan
- The Royalettes, a four-girl group from Baltimore, Maryland, with sisters Sheila and Anita Ross
- Saga, a Canadian rock band from Oakville, Ontario, Canada, whose line-up included brothers Jim and Ian Crichton
- Santo & Johnny, an American rock and roll instrumental duo from Brooklyn, New York, composed of brothers Santo and Johnny Farina, best known for their instrumental melody "Sleep Walk"
- Savatage, an American heavy metal band, founded by brothers Jon and Criss Oliva
- Scattered Trees, an American indie-rock band from Chicago, Illinois including Jason and Baron Harper
- Screaming Trees, an American rock band from Ellensburg, Washington, formed in 1984 by brothers Van Conner and Gary Lee Conner
- Secret Machines, an American alternative rock band, formed in Dallas, Texas, by brothers Brandon Curtis and Benjamin Curtis
- The Secret Sisters, an Americana singing and songwriting duo consisting of sisters Laura Rogers and Lydia Slagle
- Sepultura, Brazilian heavy metal band, Max and Igor Cavalera
- The Shaggs, an American all-female rock and outsider music band composed of sisters Dorothy "Dot" Wiggin, Betty Wiggin, Helen and, later, Rachel Wiggin
- The Shangri-Las, an American pop girl group of the 1960s that consisted of two sets of sisters, Mary Ann and Marge Ganser, and Betty and Mary Weiss
- SHeDAISY, an American country music group founded in the late 1980s by sisters Kristyn Robyn Osborn, Kelsi Marie Osborn and Kassidy Lorraine Osborn
- Shepherd Sisters, an American vocal quartet of four sisters born and raised in Middletown, Ohio
- Sheppard, an Australian indie pop band, George, Amy and Emma Sheppard
- The Sherrys, an early 1960s American girl group from Philadelphia, Pennsylvania, featuring sisters Delphine and Dinell Cook
- Shoes, an American power pop band, formed in Zion, Illinois, in 1974, by brothers John and Jeff Murphy, and Gary Klebe
- The Showmen, a New Orleans–based American doo-wop and R&B group formed in 1961 with brothers Dorsey "Chops" Knight & Gene "Cheater" Knight.
- The Showstoppers, a four-piece vocal soul group formed in Philadelphia about 1967 by brothers, Elec Edward "Alex" Burke and Vladimir H. "Laddie" Burke
- The Simon Sisters, an American folk duo, Carly and Lucy Simon
- Sister Sledge, an American musical group with Kim, Debbie, Joni, and Kathy Sledge
- Skating Polly, an American rock band, step-siblings Kelli Mayo and Peyton Bighorse, later joined by Mayo's brother Kurtis in 2017.
- Skyy, an American R&B/funk/disco band based in New York City, with sisters Denise, Dolores, and Benita "Bonné" Dunning, best known for their 1981 hit, "Call Me"
- Sly and the Family Stone, American funk, soul, and rock band, Sly, Freddie, Rose, and Vet Stone
- The Smoke Ring, pop group from Norfolk, Nebraska, with brothers Bob, Joe, and Nick Hupp, who made Billboard Hot 100 in 1969
- Smoking Popes, an American pop punk band, Josh Caterer, Matt Caterer and Eli Caterer
- Soho, an English pop trio, consisting of sisters Jacqueline (Jacqui) Cuff and Pauline Cuff, with producer Timothy London
- Son by Four, a salsa music group from Puerto Rico, well known for their English U.S. pop hit "Purest of Pain (A Puro Dolor)"
- Sons of Funk, R&B group from Richmond, CA with brothers G-Smooth and Dez Dynamic, and their cousins Renzo and Rico
- Soul Brothers Six, an American rhythm and blues band formed in Rochester, New York, during the mid-1960s, with five brothers
- Soul for Real, an R&B group from Wheatley Heights, New York (aka Soul 4 Real and Soul IV Real)
- Sounds of Sunshine, an American sunshine pop group from Los Angeles, California, consisting of three brothers (aka The Wilder Brothers)
- Spandau Ballet, Gary and Martin Kemp
- Sparks, an American pop/rock band, brothers Ron and Russell Mael. The band's original incarnation (originally known as Halfnelson) also included brothers Earle and Jim Mankey.
- The Spencer Davis Group Steve and Muff Winwood
- Split Enz, a New Zealand rock band, Tim and Neil Finn
- The Stanley Brothers, an American bluegrass duo of singer-songwriters and musicians made up of brothers Carter Stanley and Ralph Stanley
- The Staple Singers, American gospel/soul group, Cleotha, Pervis, Yvonne, and Mavis Staples (plus their father, Roebuck "Pops" Staples)
- Starpoint, 1980s dance group from Maryland with brothers Ernesto, George, Orlando & Gregory Phillips
- The Staves, a British Folk-ish band
- The Statler Brothers, American country & gospel quartet: Don Reid and Harold Reid.
- Stone Temple Pilots, an American grunge/alternative rock band, Robert and Dean DeLeo
- The Stooges, also known as Iggy and the Stooges, were an American proto-punk band formed in 1967 by singer Iggy Pop, guitarist Ron Asheton, drummer Scott Asheton, and bassist Dave Alexander
- Stryper, an American Christian metal band, Robert Sweet and Michael Sweet
- Styx, an American pop-rock band from Chicago, with eight songs that hit the Top 10 on the Billboard Hot 100, whose members include twin brothers Chuck & John Panozzo
- Supergrass, an English rock band, brothers Gaz and Rob Coombes
- The Super Lamas, a popular Mexican cumbia band with 4 brothers, known for the party song in celebration of drinking more beer, "Yo Quiero Chupar."
- The Sutherland Brothers, a Scottish folk and soft rock duo with brothers Gavin and Iain Sutherland
- Sweet Sensation, a female freestyle-dance music trio from The Bronx, New York, composed of Betty LeBron, sisters Margie & Mari Fernandez (Sheila Vega replaced Mari in 1989)
- Switch, an American R&B/funk band, with brothers Bobby and Tommy DeBarge, that found fame in the late 1970s
- Switchfoot, an American rock band, Jon Foreman and brother Tim
- The Swon Brothers, an American country music duo from Muskogee, Oklahoma
- The Sylvers, an American R&B group, included up to eight siblings at once. Nine brothers and sisters were in the band at some point including Olympia, Leon, Charmaine, James, Edmund, Joseph, Angelina, Patricia and Foster.
- Take 5, an American boy band from Orlando, Florida consisting of brothers Ryan and Jeff "Clay" Goodell, Tilky Jones, Stevie Sculthorpe, and Tim "TJ" Christofore
- Talula Gosh, English guitar-pop group consisting of sister, Amelia Fletcher and brother, Matthew
- TAMI Show, a six-member ensemble (including sisters Cathy and Claire Massey on vocals), from Chicago, Illinois, best remembered for their US top 40 hit "The Truth"
- The Tams, R&B beach music group from Atlanta, Georgia, with brothers Charles & Joseph Pope
- Tasty, twin brothers So-ryong and Dae-ryong
- Tavares, an American R&B group, has always consisted of between three and five of brothers including Arthur, Antone, Perry, Victor, Feliciano and Ralph Tavares.
- T-Connection, a funk and disco group from Nassau, Bahamas, whose members included brothers Theophilus "T" & Kirkwood Coakley
- The Teen Queens, an American musical group from the 1950s, with sisters Betty and Rosie Collins, most remembered for their hit single "Eddie My Love"
- Tegan and Sara, Canadian indie band, identical twin sisters Tegan Rain and Sara Kiersten Quin
- Nino Tempo & April Stevens, a brother & sister singing act from Niagara Falls, New York, who earned a Grammy Award for the single "Deep Purple"
- The Teskey Brothers, an Australian blues rock band from Melbourne, named after the two brothers who formed the group in 2008: Josh Teskey (vocals, rhythm guitar) and Sam Teskey (lead guitar)
- Them, a rock group formed in Belfast, Northern Ireland, whose line-up included brothers Pat & Jackie McAuley, most prominently known for the rock standard "Gloria"
- Three Days Grace, Canadian rock band, Matt and Brad Walst
- Thrice, American rock band, with brothers Riley and Eddie Breckenridge
- The Three Playmates, a female R&B doo-wop trio from Newark, New Jersey, with sisters Lucille & Alma Beatty, whose song "Sugah Wooga" made Billboard Hot 100 in 1958
- Tierra, a Latin R&B band, first established in the 1970s by former El Chicano members Steve Salas (vocals) and his brother Rudy Salas (guitar)
- Tigertown, an Australian band in existence from 2011 until 2017, comprising husband and wife Chris and Charlie Collins and including siblings of each
- Tim Tam And The Turn-Ons, a 1960s American rock band, from Allen Park, Michigan, with brothers Rick & Dan Wiesend
- The Tin Lids, an Australian children's pop group from 1990 to 1994, Eliza-Jane ("E.J."), Elly-May, Jackie, and Mahalia Barnes (the four children of Jimmy Barnes and Jane Mahoney)
- Tokio Hotel, a German pop rock band, identical twin brothers Bill and Tom Kaulitz
- Tompall & the Glaser Brothers, an American country music group, Tompall, Jim and Chuck Glaser
- Tony! Toni! Toné!, an American soul/R&B group from Oakland, California, with brothers D'wayne Wiggins & Raphael Saadiq (born Charles Ray Wiggins)
- Toto, an American rock band, brothers Steve, Jeff, and Mike Porcaro
- The Trammps, an American disco and soul band, who were based in Philadelphia, whose members included brothers Stanley and Harold 'Doc' Wade
- Trapp Family, also known as the von Trapp Family and The Trapp Family Singers
- Trapper Schoepp, an American folk rock band
- Trina & Tamara, an American contemporary R&B group from Gary, Indiana composed of sisters Trina Powell and Tamara Powell
- The Triplets, a pop rock trio composed of the triplets Diana, Sylvia, and Vicky Villegas
- TRU, an American hip hop group with three brothers Master P, C-Murder, and Silkk the Shocker
- Twinz, a hip hop duo from Long Beach, California, consisting of twin brothers Deon "Trip Locc" Williams and Dewayne "Wayniac" Williams
- UB40, an English reggae band, Ali and Robin Campbell
- Underground Sunshine, an American psychedelic rock band from Montello, Wisconsin, with brothers Berty & Frank Kohl
- The Undertones, a British punk rock / new wave band, brothers John and Damian O'Neill
- The Unthanks, an English folk group, with sisters Becky and Rachel Unthank
- U.N.V., an R&B group based out of Detroit, Michigan, with brothers John & Shawn Powe, best known for their 1993 summer hit single, "Something's Goin' On"
- The Valentinos, (also known as The Womack Brothers) was an American family R&B group from Cleveland, Ohio, best known for launching the careers of brothers Bobby Womack and Cecil Womack
- Van Halen, an American heavy metal/hard rock band, Eddie, and Alex Van Halen
- The Vaughan Brothers, blues rock duo from Texas, featuring guitarists and vocalists Jimmie & Stevie Ray Vaughan
- The Velvelettes, an American singing girl group, signed to Motown in the 1960s, with sisters Mildred & Carolyn "Cal" Gill
- Von Hertzen Brothers, a Finnish rock group, formed by three brothers
- The Veronicas, an Australian electropop pop-rock duo, Jessica and Lisa Origliasso
- The Verve Pipe, rock group from East Lansing, Michigan, with brothers Brad & Brian Vander Ark
- Voice of the Beehive, an alternative pop rock band formed in London in 1986 by Californian sisters Tracey Bryn and Melissa Brooke Belland
- Voices, an American R&B vocal girl group from Los Angeles that included sisters LaPetra & LaToya McMoore, and then-unknown twin sisters Tia and Tamera Mowry
- Wadsworth Mansion, an early-1970s American rock band with brothers Steve & Mike Jablecki, best known for their 1970 Top 10 hit "Sweet Mary"
- Rufus and Martha Wainwright
- The Warning, a Mexican rock trio, Daniela, Paulina and Alejandra Villarreal
- Wasia Project, an English music duo consisting of brother and sister William Gao and Olivia Hardy
- The Watson Twins, American musical duo, identical twin sisters Chandra and Leigh Watson
- We Are King American R&B duo based in Los Angeles, California, consisting of twin sisters Amber and Paris Strother. Originally named King.
- The Webb Brothers are Christiaan, Justin, James and Cornelius Webb, all sons of the songwriter Jimmy Webb
- Wet Willie, an American band from Mobile, Alabama, with brothers Jimmy & Jack Hall, best known for "Keep On Smilin'"
- The Whispers, an American R&B group, founded by twin brothers Wallace and Walter Scott
- Whitehead Bros., an American R&B duo from Philadelphia, Pennsylvania, made up of two brothers, Kenny Whitehead and John Whitehead Jr.
- Wild Belle, an American band, composed of siblings Elliot and Natalie Bergman
- The Wilkinsons, a Canadian country music trio, founded in 1997, that consisted of lead singer Amanda Wilkinson, her brother Tyler Wilkinson, and their father, Steve Wilkinson
- The Williams Brothers, a singing quartet that performed extensively on radio, movies, nightclubs, and television from 1938 through the 1990s
- Willie Max, a R&B trio composed of sisters Rose, Sky and Lyric Smith
- The Wilson Family, an English folk music group, composed of six siblings
- Wilson Phillips, an American pop group, sisters Wendy and Carnie Wilson
- Wimberley Bluegrass Band an American bluegrass band, three brothers and a sister, innovated on traditional music.
- Johnny and Edgar Winter, American rock musicians who often performed and recorded together
- The Wood Brothers, an American folk band consisting of brothers Chris & Oliver Wood, as well as multi-instrumentalist Jano Rix
- The Woolies, an American rock band from Lansing, Michigan, with brothers Bob Baldori & Jeff Baldori, whose cover of "Who Do You Love?" became a regional hit when it was released as a single in 1966
- Xscape, an American female R&B vocal quintet from Atlanta, Georgia, with sisters LaTocha & Tamika Scott
- Young Guns, British rock band, brothers John and Fraser Taylor
- YU grupa, a Serbian rock band, Dragi, Zika and Petar Jelic
- Zapp, an American soul, funk, and P-Funk band whose nucleus was the Troutman brothers Roger, Larry, Lester, and Terry along with other relatives

== Sibling groups in other mass media ==
- The Coen Brothers, American screenwriters, directors and producers
- The Farrelly Brothers, American screenwriters and directors
- The Kardashians, American reality television stars and socialites: Kourtney, Kim, Khloé and Rob. By virtue of appearing alongside their half-siblings on the reality television program Keeping Up with the Kardashians, Kendall and Kylie Jenner are sometimes included in this group, though they are the children of Kris Jenner and former spouse Caitlyn Jenner, not Robert Kardashian.
- The Marx Brothers, American comedy actors
- The McElroy brothers, known for their podcasts My Brother, My Brother and Me and The Adventure Zone, consisting of Justin McElroy, Travis McElroy, and Griffin McElroy
- The Olsen twins, American actresses Mary-Kate and Ashley
- The Polish brothers, American filmmakers
- The Property Brothers, twin brothers Drew Scott and Jonathan Scott, stars of the Canadian reality television series.
- Brothers Quay, filmmaking twins
- Shaw Brothers, Hong Kong film production company by Runje, Runme, Runde, and Run Run Shaw
- The Smothers Brothers, American comedians Tom and Dick
- Dylan and Cole Sprouse, American actors
- The Wachowskis, American screenwriters, directors and producers
- Wahlburgers, reality TV series starring brothers Paul, Mark and Donnie Wahlburg
- Warner Bros. was founded by the Warner brothers: Harry, Albert, Sam, and Jack
- The Wayans Brothers, African-American directors, screenwriters and actors

== Siblings in crime ==
- Yigal Amir assassinated Israeli Prime Minister Yitzhak Rabin in conspiracy with his brother Hagai Amir and their friend Dror Adani
- John and Clarence Anglin, Brothers who robbed banks. After escaping jail many times they were sent to Alcatraz where they escaped with Frank Morris and most likely drowned.
- Barker–Karpis Gang, consisted of, among others, Kate Barker's sons
- Briley Brothers, a trio who were serial killers. Linwood and James were executed and Anthony was sentenced to life imprisonment.
- Dalton Gang, 5 of the 9 members were brothers
- Kray twins (Ronald and Reggie) - infamously known for their participation in organised crime during the 1950s and 1960s
- Lyle and Erik Menendez, murdered both parents
- Pincheira brothers, an infamous Chilean royalist outlaw group in the early 19th century
- The Tsarnaev brothers, Dzhokhar and Tamerlan, perpetrator of Boston Marathon bombing
- Jasmiyah Kaneesha Whitehead and Tasmiyah Janeesha Whitehead, identical twins murdered their mother Nikki Whitehead
- Ned and Dan Kelly, the most famous Australian bushrangers. More books have been written about the Kelly Gang than any other subject in Australian history.

== Other sibling groups ==
- The Dionne quintuplets, Canadian family, first quintuplets to survive to adulthood
- The Brothers Grimm, German folklorists and anthropologists
- The Koch brothers, American politicians and industrialists
- Hans and Sophie Scholl, German students and anti-Nazi activists executed in 1943
- The Lumière brothers, French photography manufacturers, filmmakers and cinématographe motion picture inventors.
- The Montgolfier Brothers, French inventors.
- Salazar brothers, notable group of Chilean siblings who became known for their slave raiding, corruption and role in unleashing the Mapuche uprising of 1655
- Sutter brothers, Canadian family who played or have been associated with the National Hockey League
- The Wright brothers, aviation pioneers and inventors
- OTMA, an acronym used by the daughters of Tsar Nicholas II of Russia
- The Polgár Sisters Susan, Sofia and Judit Polgar, each received a Chess Grandmaster title at an early age
- The Kelly Family
- Maserati Brothers
- Wood Brothers
- Green children of Woolpit

== Fictional sibling groups ==
- Alvin and the Chipmunks: Alvin, Simon and Theodore
- The Baudelaire Orphans: Violet, Klaus, Sunny (A Series of Unfortunate Events)
- The Blues Brothers: Jake and Elwood
- Bobs Burgers: Tina Belcher, Gene Belcher, and Louise Belcher
- The Brady Bunch: Greg Brady, Peter Brady, Bobby Brady, Marcia Brady, Jan Brady and Cindy Brady
- The Carmichaels: Ashton, Ashley, Gax, Gianna, Lamar, Lily, Edgar, Sully, Sally, Elliot, and Suzy (Rugrats)
- The Incredibles: Dash Parr, Violet Parr, Jack-Jack Parr
- Hamada brothers - Hiro and Tadashi (Big Hero 6)
- House of the Hearth - Lyney, Lynette and Freminet (Genshin Impact)
- The Itsukas - Shido and Kotori (Date A Live)
- The Johnsons - Carl and Sean (Grand Theft Auto: San Andreas)
- The Kamisato siblings - Ayato and Ayaka (Genshin Impact)
- Kamiya half-brothers - Eiji and Maki (Wangan Midnight)
- Koopa Bros.: Green Ninjakoopa, Yellow Ninjakoopa, Black Ninjakoopa and Red Ninjakoopa (Paper Mario)
- Koopalings: Larry, Iggy, Roy, Morton, Lemmy, Wendy, and Ludwig (Super Mario Bros. 3)
- Lannisters: Cersei Lannister, Jaime Lannister, and Tyrion Lannister (children of Tywin Lannister in Game of Thrones)
- Magic Tree House series: Annie and Jack
- Meg, Jo, Beth, and Amy March (Little Women)
- Mario Bros.: Mario and Luigi (Super Mario Bros.)
- The Mills Sisters: Regina and Zelena (Once Upon a Time)
- Mobile Suit Gundam: Casval Rem Daikun and Artesia Som Deikun
- Nakano quintuplets: Ichika, Nino, Miku, Yotsuba and Itsuki (The Quintessential Quintuplets)
- The Partridge Family: Keith, Laurie, Danny, Chris and Tracy, a television series about a musical family that ran from 1970 to 1974
- The Powerpuff Girls: Blossom, Bubbles and Buttercup
- The Pfefferman Family: Sarah, Josh and Ali (Transparent)
- Scott brothers: Lucas and Nathan (One Tree Hill)
- The Simpsons: Bart, Lisa and Maggie
- The Skywalkers: Luke and Leia
- Takahashi brothers: Keisuke and Ryosuke (Initial D)
- The Weasleys: Ron, Fred, George, and Ginny
- The Yo Dazzlers: Riffington, Big Bitz, Jean-Pierre, and Chip Dazzler (Yo Gabba Gabba)

== See also ==
- List of coupled siblings
