= Every Mother's Son (disambiguation) =

Every Mother's Son was an American sunshine pop band formed in New York City in 1966.

The phrase may also refer to:

- Every Mother's Son (album), a 1967 album by Every Mother's Son
- "Every Mother's Son" is a song by Lynyrd Skynyrd from their album Gimme Back My Bullets
- Every Mother's Son (1918 film), 1918 American silent war propaganda film
- Every Mother's Son (1926 film), 1926 British drama film
- "Every Mother's Son" (Homicide: Life on the Street), a 1995 television episode
- Redheap, also published as Every Mother's Son, a 1930 novel by Norman Lindsay
