= Tim Tam (disambiguation) =

Tim Tam is a chocolate biscuit available in Australia and New Zealand.

Tim Tam may also refer to:

- Tim Tam (horse) (1955–1982), racehorse
- Tim Tam and the Turn-Ons, R&B/Soul musicians on 60s Palmer label
