= 1997 Soul Train Lady of Soul Awards =

American awards show

Soul Train Lady of Soul Awards
- Date: September 5, 1997
- Location: Santa Monica Civic Auditorium, Santa Monica, California
- Country: United States
- Hosted by: Chaka Khan, Bill Bellamy, Erykah Badu

Highlights
- Most awards: Erykah Badu (4)

The 1997 Soul Train Lady of Soul Awards were held on September 5, 1997, at the Santa Monica Civic Auditorium in Santa Monica, California. Produced by Don Cornelius Productions, the third annual awards program was co-hosted by Chaka Khan, Bill Bellamy and Erykah Badu.

== Special awards ==
=== Aretha Franklin Award for Entertainer of the Year ===
- Queen Latifah

=== Lena Horne Award for Outstanding Career Achievement ===
- Janet Jackson

== Winners and nominees ==
Winners are in bold text.

=== Best R&B/Soul Single – Solo ===
- **Erykah Badu – "On & On"**

=== Best R&B/Soul Single – Group, Band or Duo ===
- **En Vogue – "Don't Let Go (Love)"**

=== R&B/Soul Album of the Year – Solo ===
- **Erykah Badu – Baduizm**

=== R&B/Soul Album of the Year – Group, Band or Duo ===
- **702 – No Doubt**

=== Best R&B/Soul or Rap New Artist ===
- **Erykah Badu – "On & On"**

=== Best R&B/Soul or Rap Music Video ===
- **Lil' Kim – "Crush on You"**

=== Best Gospel Album ===
- **LaShun Pace – A Wealthy Place**

=== Best Jazz Album ===
- **Dianne Reeves – The Grand Encounter**

=== R&B/Soul or Rap Song of the Year ===
- **Erykah Badu – "On & On"**
