= The Phynx =

1970 film by Lee H. Katzin

- Directed by: Lee H. Katzin
- Written by: Bob Booker; Stan Cornyn; George Foster
- Produced by: Bob Booker; George Foster
- Starring: Michael A. Miller; Ray Chippeway; Dennis Larden; Lonny Stevens
- Cinematography: Michel Hugo
- Edited by: Dann Cahn
- Music by: Mike Stoller
- Production company: Warner Bros.
- Distributed by: Warner Bros.
- Release date: May 6, 1970
- Running time: 81 minutes
- Language: English

The Phynx is a 1970 American comedy film directed by Lee H. Katzin about a rock and roll band named The Phynx and their mission in foreign affairs. The group is sent to Albania to locate celebrity hostages taken prisoner by Communists. The last part of the film, supposedly set in Albania, was filmed in the Spanish city of Ávila, recognizable by its medieval walls.

This turned out to be the final film appearance for several of the veteran performers in the cast, including Leo Gorcey, George Tobias and Marilyn Maxwell.

== Plot ==
Four young men, the members of the Phynx rock group, are assigned to recover a number of famous American citizens that have been lured to Albania and then trapped behind a tall wall, threatened by the country's solitary tank, and cannot leave. The Phynx must find the secret map to infiltrate the castle. It is printed in parts on three different women's stomachs in three different European countries. To discover the girls marked with the maps, the Phynx must have sex with hundreds of girls. Their labors are lessened when in Rome they are given X-ray glasses, which visually strip the girls down to their underwear. Finally, the four get into the castle and hatch a plot to hide the celebrities in wagons of radishes, topple the enclosing wall with hundreds of electric guitars, and escape.

== Cast ==
- The Phynx... Themselves
  - Michael A. Miller
  - Ray Chippeway
  - Dennis Larden
  - Lonny Stevens
- Lou Antonio... Corrigan
- Mike Kellin... Bogey
- Michael Ansara... Col. Rostinov
- George Tobias... Markevitch
- Joan Blondell... Ruby
- Martha Raye... Foxy
- Larry Hankin... Philbaby
- Pat McCormick... Father O'Hoolihan
- Ultra Violet... Felice
- Rich Little... Voice in Box
- Susan Bernard... London Belly
- Sally Struthers... World's No. 1 Fan

=== Cameos ===
- Patty Andrews
- Rona Barrett
- Edgar Bergen and Charlie McCarthy
- Busby Berkeley
- James Brown
- Dick Clark
- Xavier Cugat
- Cass Daley
- Andy Devine
- Fritz Feld
- Leo Gorcey (in his final film role, released after his death.)
- Huntz Hall
- John Hart (as The Lone Ranger)
- Louis Hayward
- George Jessel
- Ruby Keeler
- Patsy Kelly
- Dorothy Lamour
- Guy Lombardo
- Trini Lopez
- Joe Louis
- Marilyn Maxwell (in her final film role)
- Butterfly McQueen
- Pat O'Brien
- Maureen O'Sullivan
- Richard Pryor
- Harold Sakata
- Colonel Sanders
- Jay Silverheels (as Tonto)
- Ed Sullivan
- Rudy Vallee
- Clint Walker
- Johnny Weissmuller

== Home media ==
The Phynx received an extremely limited release, and has since become an obscure, rarely seen cult film; bootleg copies for many years turned up on auction websites before Warner Archive officially released the film on DVD in October 2012.

== Significance ==
This was Gorcey and Hall's final time they appeared in a film together; the duo made dozens of films together as The Dead End Kids, East Side Kids, and The Bowery Boys from the 1930s to the 1950s.

== See also ==
- List of American films of 1970
- Top Secret! (1984)
