= No Name (Slovak band) =

Slovak rock band

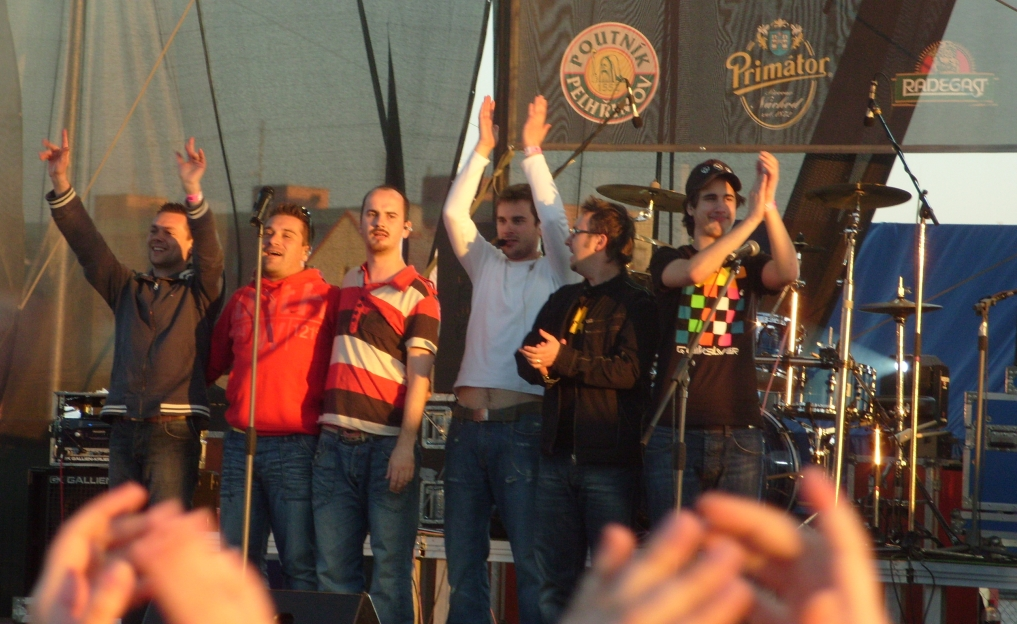
- No Name in 2008

Background information
- Origin: Košice, Slovakia
- Genres: Rock; pop rock
- Years active: 1996–present
- Labels: Universal Music
- Members: Igor Timko; Roman Timko; Dušan Timko; Ivan Timko; Zoltán Šallai; Pavol Jakab
- Past members: Marián Čekovský; Viliam Gutray
- Website: no-name.sk

No Name is a Slovak rock band formed in Košice in 1996 by Viliam Gutray and three Timko brothers: Igor, Roman, and Ivan. Marián Čekovský joined as a keyboardist and was later replaced by Zoli Šallai. A few years later, the youngest Timko brother, Dušan, also became a member of the band. No Name became known to Slovak audiences by taking part in the Bratislavská lýra festival in 1997

== History ==
No Name was founded in 1996 in the Slovak city of Košice by the Timko brothers Igor, Roman, and Ivan, together with bass guitarist Viliam Gutray. The band's vocalist, Igor, who teaches singing at the conservatory in Košice, had performed on the TV music talent show Zlatá brána as a child. The band won the Košický zlatý poklad song contest in November 1996, which led to their participation in the following year's Bratislavská lýra.

No Name released their self-titled debut album in 1998 and followed it two years later with Počkám si na zázrak, which spawned the single "Žily". Their third album, Oslávme si život, came out in 2001, and was followed by Slova do tmy in 2003. After publishing Čím to je in 2005 and V rovnováhe in 2008, the band went on a three-year hiatus.

Their seventh studio album, titled Nový album, was released in 2011. The first single, "Ženušky", was a duet with Czech singer Lucie Bílá. No Name issued two further albums: Love Songs in 2012 and S láskou in 2015.

In 2017, the band recorded the single "Kto požeje" with Czech singer Karel Gott. The piece was released in three versions, including an instrumental one as well as with the accompaniment of the Slovak Radio Symphony Orchestra. On 24 October 2018, on the occasion of the centenary of the founding of Czechoslovakia, No Name released "Ži... a nech žit", a composition sung in both Czech and Slovak.

In 2021, to celebrate their 25th anniversary, the band released a new song, titled "Elity". In 2023, they published the album V pôvodnom znení.

== Band members ==
Current

- Igor Timko – vocals
- Roman Timko – guitar, vocals
- Zoltán Šallai – keyboards, vocals
- Ivan Timko – drums, vocals
- Dušan Timko – guitar
- Pavol Jakab – bass

Past

- Marián Čekovský – keyboards
- Viliam Gutray – bass

== Discography ==
Studio albums

- No Name (1998)
- Počkám si na zázrak (2000)
- Oslávme si život (2001)
- Slová do tmy (2003)
- Čím to je (2005)
- V rovnováhe (2008)
- Nový album (2011)
- Love Songs (2012)
- S láskou (2015)
- V pôvodnom znení (2023)

EPs

- Kto dokáže (feat. Karel Gott) (2016)

Live albums

- Live in Prague (2008)
- G2 Acoustic Stage (2014)
- 20 rokov No Name (2019)
- Dermacol Acoustic Tour (2019)

Compilations

- The Best of No Name (2009)
- No Name Box (2018)
- 25 the Best of No Name (2022)

DVDs

- Live in Europe (2006)
- V rovnováhe tour (2010)
- Tour 2011 Steel Arena Košice (2011)
- G2 Acoustic Stage (2014)
- No Name Box (2018)
- 20 rokov No Name (2019)

== Awards and recognition ==
- Český slavík 2016 – Best Slovak Artist

== See also ==
- The 100 Greatest Slovak Albums of All Time
