= LaShun Pace =

American singer-songwriter (1961–2022)

- Also known as: LaShun Pace; LaShun Pace-Rhodes; Shun Pace-Rhodes
- Born: Tarrian LaShun Pace; September 6, 1961; Atlanta, Georgia, U.S.
- Died: March 21, 2022 (aged 60) Atlanta, Georgia, U.S.
- Genre: Gospel
- Occupations: Singer; songwriter; evangelist
- Instrument: Vocals
- Years active: 1976–2022
- Labels: Savoy; EMI
- Formerly of: The Anointed Pace Sisters

Tarrian LaShun Pace (September 6, 1961 – March 21, 2022), professionally known as LaShun Pace and sometimes credited as LaShun Pace-Rhodes or Shun Pace-Rhodes, was an American gospel singer, songwriter and evangelist. Pace was also a Stellar Award winner.

== Biography ==
=== Early life and education ===
Pace was the fifth of ten children born to Pastor Murphy J. Pace and Bettie Ann Pace in Atlanta. Pace along with her sisters and brother were raised in a small community called Poole Creek. For high school, Pace attended Walter F. George High School (now known as South Atlanta High School); graduating in 1979.

=== Career ===
Pace began singing professionally during her teen years in the mid-1970s, performing solo and later alongside her sisters in the group The Anointed Pace Sisters, which formed in the late 1980s. Pace's singing and ministering skills were honed while she was on tour with the Rev. Gene Martin and the Action Revival Team, and with The Edwin Hawkins Singers from 1986 until her death.

In 1988 she recorded In the House of the Lord with Dr. Jonathan Greer and the Cathedral of Faith Church of God in Christ Choirs for Savoy Records. The label signed Pace as a solo artist soon afterwards. In 1990, she released her debut album He Lives, which reached the number two spot on the Billboard gospel charts and featured her signature song "I Know I've Been Changed". The follow-up song Shekinah Glory, appeared in 1993. Three years later, Pace returned with Wealthy Place, which included the song "Act Like You Know" featuring Karen Clark Sheard. After her debut album on Savoy Records "He Lives", Pace became the inspiration and starred in Tyler Perry's " I Know I've been changed". This was his debut breakthrough stage play which he wrote and produced. This play marked his multi-million dollar entertainment career. The play originally debuted in Atlanta in 1992 and ran through 1998.

In addition to successive releases such as 1998's Just Because God Said It, Pace also enjoyed a career as an actress, most notably co-starring as the Angel of Mercy in the 1992 Steve Martin film Leap of Faith. LaShun Pace was inducted into the Christian Music Hall of Fame in 2007. She was to attend the official presentation ceremony with many guests to be formally inducted, but became ill and unable to attend. In 2009, LaShun was nominated for Urban Performer of the Year in the Visionary Awards. Winners were to be announced live during the 2009 Christian Music Hall of Fame Awards Show on November 14, 2009.

=== Illness and death ===
Pace had been on dialysis for several years and was awaiting a kidney. She died of organ failure according to her family on March 21, 2022, at the age of 60.

== Personal life ==
Pace was married to Edward Rhodes, a Georgia–based minister and intern at Savoy Records in New York, from 1988 until divorcing in 1993. they had two daughters (firstborn who passed away in 2002 and 2nd born now a thriving adult.) They met as backup singers for Rev. James Moore. Rhodes was responsible for introducing her to Rev. Milton Biggham who signed her to Savoy Records. He also introduced her to Edwin and Walter Hawkins. Ms. Pace reunited with Rev. Moore as a label mate on Malaco Records and continued singing with him on various projects, and was with him until his death on June 7, 2000, due to diabetes.

== Discography ==
- In the House of the Lord with Dr. Jonathan Greer and the Cathedral of Faith Choir (1988)
- He Lives (1990)
- Shekinah Glory (1993)
- A Wealthy Place (1996)
- Just Because God Said It (1998)
- God Is Faithful (2001)
- It's My Time (2005)
- Complete (2007)
- Reborn (2011)
- "By Your Word" (2014)
- "Joy" (2019)
- "The Spirit" (2021)

== Awards and nominations ==
=== Dove Awards ===
The Dove Awards are awarded annually by the Gospel Music Association. Pace has earned 1 nomination.

Year	Award	Nominated work	Result
2008	Traditional Gospel Album of the Year	Complete	Nominated

=== Stellar Awards ===
The Stellar Awards are awarded annually by SAGMA. Pace has received 2 awards from 6 nominations.

Year	Award	Nominated work	Result
1992	New Artist of the Year	He Lives	Won
1999	Traditional Female Vocalist of the Year	Just Because God Said It	Won
2003	Traditional Female Vocalist of the Year	God is Faithful	Nominated
2003	Female Vocalist of the Year	God is Faithful	Nominated
2006	Female Vocalist of the Year	It's My Time	Nominated
2012	Traditional Female Vocalist of the Year	Reborn	Nominated

=== Soul Train Awards ===
The Soul Train Music Awards are awarded annually. Pace has received 1 award from 2 nominations.

Year	Award	Nominated work	Result
Soul Train Lady of Soul Awards
1997	Best Gospel Album	A Wealthy Place	Won
2002	Best Gospel Album	God Is Faithful	Nominated

=== Miscellaneous awards and honors ===
Year	Organization	Award	Nominated work	Result
2007	Christian Music Hall of Fame		Herself	Inducted
2015	BMI Trailblazers of Gospel Music Awards	Trailblazer of Gospel Music	The Antointed Pace Sisters	Honored
2025	National Convention of Gospel Choirs & Choruses	Thomas A Dorsey Lifetime Achievement Award	The Antointed Pace Sisters	Honored
