= Every Mother's Son (album) =

Studio album by Every Mother's Son
- Released: 1967
- Studio: Allegro Sound Studios, New York City
- Genre: Sunshine pop; folk rock
- Length: 28:10
- Label: MGM Records
- Producer: Wes Farrell

Every Mother's Son chronology
Every Mother's Son (1967)	Every Mother's Son's Back (1967)

Singles from Every Mother's Son
- 1. "Come On Down to My Boat" Released: April 1967

Professional ratings
Review scores
Source	Rating
Allmusic	2/5 stars

Every Mother's Son is the debut album by American band Every Mother's Son, released in 1967 on MGM Records. It blended both sunshine pop and folk rock influences. The album was preceded by the single, "Come On Down to My Boat".

== Background ==
Following up on the success of their hit single "Come On Down to My Boat", which eventually reached No. 6 on the Billboard Hot 100, Every Mother's Son recorded their debut eponymous album in 1967. The single which was previously recorded by garage rock band Rare Breed, had been recorded in late 1966. It was written by the team of Wes Farrell and Jerry Goldstein who also produced the album. The remaining ten tracks were all written by Dennis Larden in conjunction with other group members. On the album, the song "Come On Down to My Boat" was titled "Come and Take a Ride in My Boat", as it was on the Rare Breed version. Much of the music on the album was described as "clean summer rock" reminiscent of the Beach Boys or the Mamas & Papas. The album eventually peaked at No. 117 on the Billboard 200.

Their follow up album did not chart, although it had two charting singles on it, and the group broke up by 1968.

== Track listing ==
1. "Come and Take a Ride in My Boat" (Wes Farrell, Jerry Goldstein) – 2:18
2. "I Won't" (Dennis Larden, Larry Larden) – 2:24
3. "For Brandy" (Larden, Larden) – 2:30
4. "Didn't She Lie" (Larden, Larden) – 2:09
5. "What Became of Mary" (D. Larden) – 3:04
6. "Ain't It a Drag" (Larden, Larden) – 2:17
7. "Allison Dozer" (Larden, Larden) – 2:59
8. "I Believe in You" (Larden, Larden) – 2:33
9. "Ain't No Use" (Peter J. Milner, D. Larden – 2:30
10. "Sittin' Here (Peter's Tune)" (Larden, Larden) – 2:42
11. "Come On Queenie" (Larden, Larden) – 2:44

== Personnel ==
=== Musicians ===
- Dennis Larden & Larry Larden – vocals, guitars
- Bruce Milner – organ, piano
- Christopher Augustine – drums
- Schuyler Larsen – bass guitar

=== Technical ===
- Wes Farrell – producer
- Val Valentin – engineer
- Bruce Staple – engineer

== Charts ==
Album – Billboard (United States)

Year	Chart	Position
1967	Billboard 200	117
