= Charlie Belle =

American indie pop duo

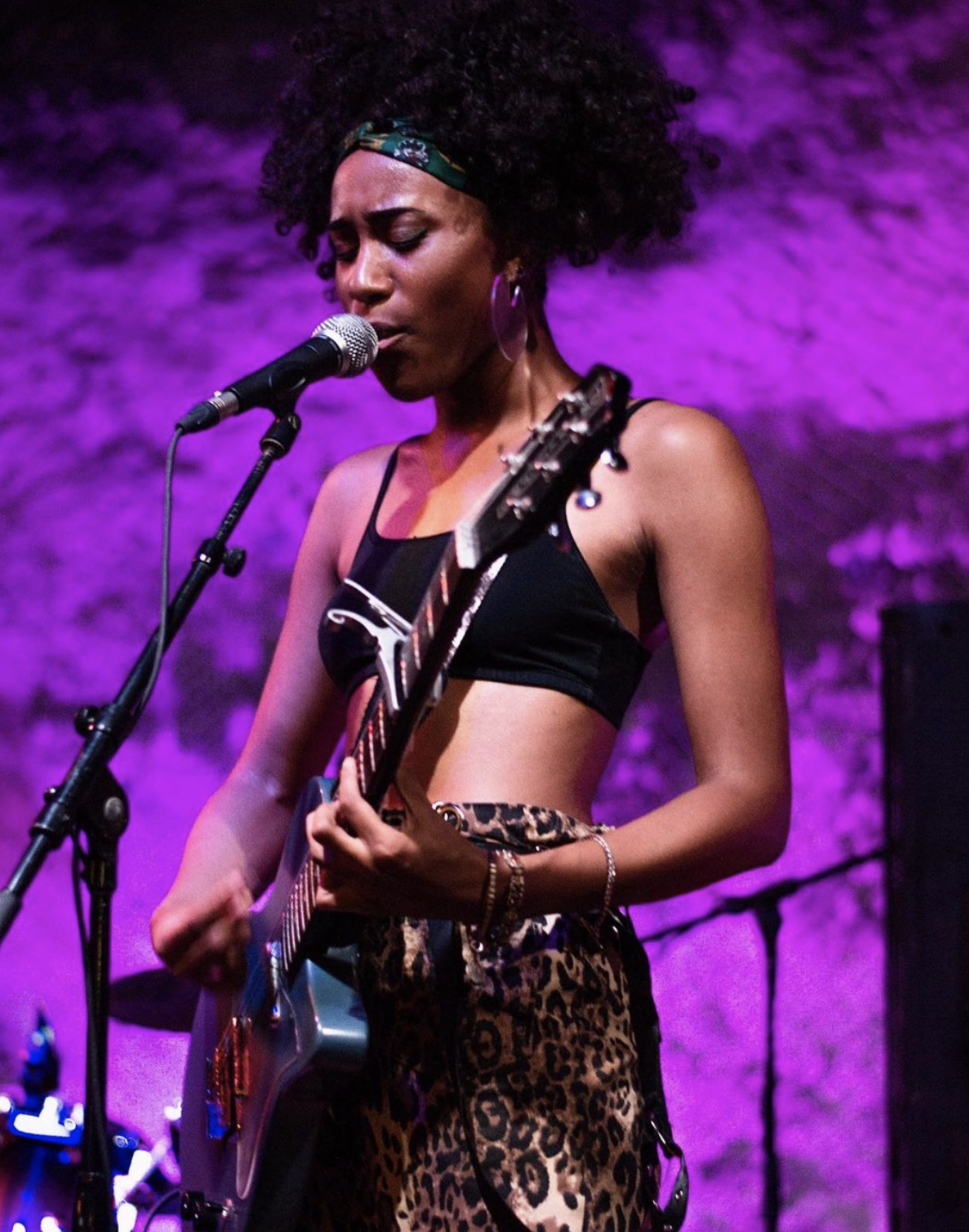
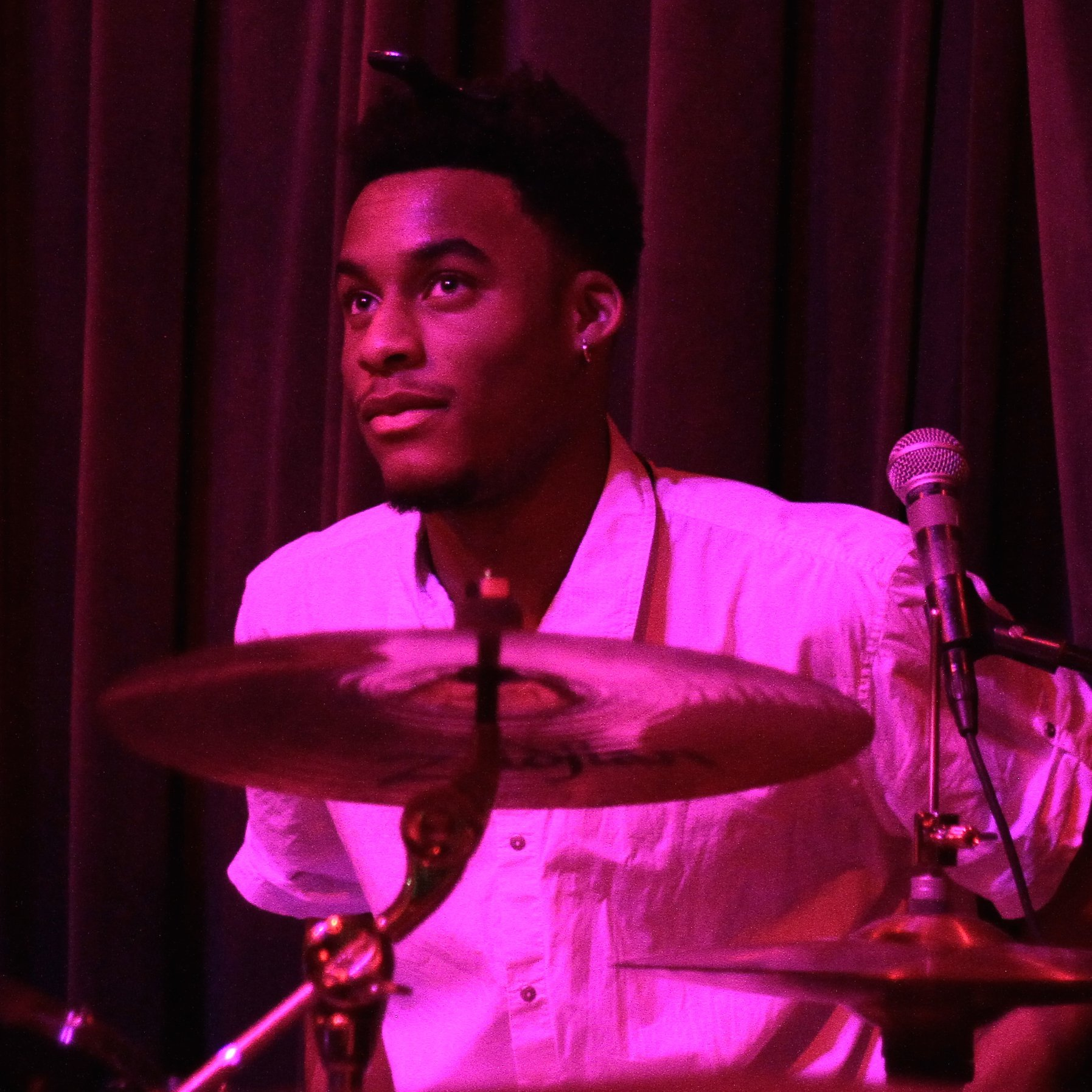

Background information
- Origin: Austin, Texas, United States
- Genres: Indie Pop, Indie Rock, Alternative Rock
- Years active: 2009–present
- Labels: Fanatic Records, Caroline Records, AWAL
- Members: Jendayi Bonds; Gyasi Bonds
- Website: Official website

Charlie Belle is an American indie pop duo from Austin, Texas composed of siblings Jendayi and Gyasi Bonds.

== Early life ==
Jendayi and Gyasi Bonds lived just outside Philadelphia and attended The Paul Green School of Rock 2005-2008 in Philadelphia, the music school that the movie School of Rock is based. After relocating to Austin, Texas in 2008, the pair began performing as Rank & File and eventually changed the band's name to Charlie Belle, which is their paternal great-grandmother's name. They have cited the Arctic Monkeys, The Roots, The Strokes, and Corinne Bailey Rae as influences. Jendayi attended the Ann Richards School, graduated from Anderson High School in 2016, and Belmont University in 2020. Gyasi graduated from Anderson High School in 2019 and currently attends college in Chicago.

== History ==
=== Early years and formation ===
Originally from the Philadelphia area, Jendayi and Gyasi, along with their parents, moved (back) to Austin, Texas, in 2008 and officially formed Charlie Belle. Since 2009 the band has played at national festivals such as Austin City Limits Music Festival and SXSW Music Festival. The pair's paternal grandparents are classically trained professional singers and retired educators of the Duke Ellington School of the Arts. Their grandfather, Samuel Bonds, Sr., founded and directed the award winning Duke Ellington Show Choir, and has worked with world-renowned opera singers Jessye Norman and Denyce Graves.

=== 2015–2017 ===
In 2015, Charlie Belle released an EP titled Get to Know, which was recorded at East Austin Recording Studio and was produced by James Stevens of the band Moonlight Towers. It garnered acclaim from NPR, Nylon Magazine, and The Guardian. This spurred their signing to NYC boutique label, Fanatic Records, a subset of Caroline Records. In late 2015, the duo released a second EP, the first with their new label, titled, I Don't Want to Be Alone, which garnered similar acclaim.

=== 2017–2019 ===
In early 2016, Charlie Belle began recording their debut LP at Orb Recording Studios in Austin TX. Produced by Matt Noveskey of Blue October, the original 10-song LP was remastered as two 5-song EPs. Like I Love This was independently released in September 2018, while the remaining 5 songs are unreleased.

=== 2020–present ===
July: Charlie Belle released the single Sun-Dried in collaboration with UK DJ Star Slinger. The song samples the 2015 banger Shake You Off from the band's debut release. Elaborating on the notion of being pushed into a relationship that you didn't necessarily want, Star Slinger was inspired by an ex who "love bombed" him into a romance.

September: Charlie Belle released the single Looking For Magic, one of the previously unreleased songs recorded at Orb Recording Studios in 2016.

October: Charlie Belle released the single What About Me?, one of the previously unreleased songs recorded at Orb Recording Studios in 2016.

== Discography ==
Studio EPs

- Get To Know [EP] (2014)
- I Don't Want To Be Alone [EP] (2015)
- Like I Love This [EP] (2018)

Singles

- "Sun-Dried" [in collaboration with Star Slinger] (2020)
- "Looking For Magic" (2020)
- "What About Me?" (2020)
