= The Anointed Pace Sisters =

American gospel vocal group

The Anointed Pace Sisters/Siblings
- Also known as: The Pace Sisters; TAPS; The Pace Siblings
- Origin: Atlanta, Georgia, U.S.
- Genres: Gospel; urban contemporary gospel; soul
- Years active: 1979–present
- Labels: Savoy; Tyscot; Gospel Pace
- Members: Phyllis Pace; June Pace–Martin; Melonda Pace; Dejuaii Pace; Leslie Pace; Latrice Pace; Lydia Pace
- Past members: LaShun Pace; Duranice Pace and Murphy Pace III

The Anointed Pace Sisters, commonly known as The Pace Sisters, TAPS or The Pace Siblings, is an American gospel vocal group based in Atlanta. The group was originally composed of sisters Duranice Ann, Phyllis Yvonne, June Lorraine, Melonda Arline, DeJuaii Olesia, Leslie Renee, Latrice Ann, and Lydia Likithia Pace. Their sister LaShun Pace had a solo career and occasionally performed with the group as a recurring member.

The Anointed Pace Sisters released 7 albums with two labels during their tenure: 1989's It's Morning Time and 1990's In the Hands of God for Faith Records, 1992's U-Know with Savoy Records, 1995's My Purpose again with Savoy, then 2003's It's Already Done by their own label Gospel Pace, 2006's Return by Tyscot Records, and 2009's Access Granted from Tyscot Records. The group's albums U-Know, My Purpose, Return, and Access Granted charted on the Billboard Gospel Albums chart.

The oldest sister, evangelist Dr. Duranice Pace, one of the group's lead vocalists and a songwriter, died on January 14, 2021.

== Background and history ==
Their parents were Reverend Murphy Pace Jr. and his wife, Mother Bettie Ann Pace and the siblings were all born in Atlanta. The Anointed Pace Sisters featuring their brother began singing together in their father's church and they began their professional singing career in 1988. One brother Murphy Joshua Pace III (July 22, 1956 – February 16, 2011) and 9 sisters: Duranice Ann Pace (May 13, 1958 – January 14, 2021), Phyllis Yvonne Pace (born February 22, 1959), June Lorraine Pace–Martin (born February 13, 1960), LaShun Pace (September 6, 1961 – March 21, 2022), Melonda Pace (born December 10, 1963), DeJuaii Pace (born April 24, 1965), Leslie Renee Pace (born January 13, 1967), Latrice Pace (born August 28, 1972), and Lydia Lakithia Pace (born April 29, 1974).

The group released 7 albums from 1989 until 2009, the first being In the Hands of God in 1989 and It's Morning Time in 1990, both released through Faith Records and produced by Walter Hawkins and Oliver Wells. In 1992, they released U-Know and in 1995, they released My Purpose. The third self-released via Gospel Pace, It's Already Done in 2003. The next two were released by Tyscot Records in 2006's Return and 2009's Access Granted. Four albums from the group charted on the Billboard Gospel Albums chart: U-Know at No. 2, My Purpose at No. 17, Return at No. 20, and Access Granted at No. 5. The last album charted on the Independent Albums chart at No. 39.

== Members ==
- Murphy Pace III: Tenor (born July 11, 1956, died February 16, 2011)
- Duranice Pace: Soprano (Alto) (born May 13, 1958; died January 14, 2021)
- Phyllis Pace: Mezzo-Soprano (Tenor) (70 as of 2026)
- June Pace–Martin: Soprano (Alto) (66 as of 2026)
- LaShun Pace: Soprano (Alto/Soprano) (born September 1961; died March 21, 2022)
- Melonda Pace: Soprano (Soprano) (63 as of 2026)
- DeJuaii Pace: Mezzo-Soprano (Alto) (59 as of 2026)
- Leslie Pace Soprano: (Tenor/Alto/Soprano) (58 as of 2026)
- Latrice Pace: Soprano (Alto/Soprano) (53 as of 2026)
- Lydia Pace: Soprano (Soprano/Alto) (52 as of 2026)

== Discography ==
List of albums, with selected chart positions
Title	Album details	Peak chart positions	
Title	Album details	US Gos	US Indie
In The Hands of God	Released: 1989; Label: Faith Records; CD	–	–
Its Morning Time	Released: 1990; Label: Faith Records; CD	–	–
U-Know	Released: 1992; Label: Savoy Records; CD, digital download	2	–
My Purpose	Released: February 22, 1995; Label: Savoy Records; CD, digital download	17	–
It's Already Done	Released: April 8, 2003; Label: Gospel Pace; CD, digital download	–	–
Return	Released: October 24, 2006; Label: Tyscot; CD, digital download	20	–
Access Granted	Released: October 20, 2009; Label: Tyscot; CD, digital download	5	39

== Awards and nominations ==
=== Stellar Awards ===
The Stellar Awards are awarded annually by SAGMA. The Antointed Pace Sisters have received 7 nominations.

Year	Award	Nominated work	Result
2008	Group or Duo of the Year	Return	Nominated
2008	Traditional CD of the Year	Return	Nominated
2008	Traditional Group or Duo of the Year	Return	Nominated
2011	Group or Duo of the Year	Access Granted	Nominated
2011	Praise and Worship CD of the Year	Access Granted	Nominated
2011	Traditional Group/Duo of the Year	Access Granted	Nominated
2011	Music Video of the Year	"If I Be Lifted Up"	Nominated

=== Miscellaneous awards and honors ===
Year	Organization	Award	Nominated work	Result
2015	BMI Trailblazers of Gospel Music Awards	Trailblazer of Gospel Music	Themselves	Honored
2025	National Convention of Gospel Choirs & Choruses	Thomas A Dorsey Lifetime Achievement Award	Themselves	Honored
