= Duranice Pace =

American musical artist (1958–2021)

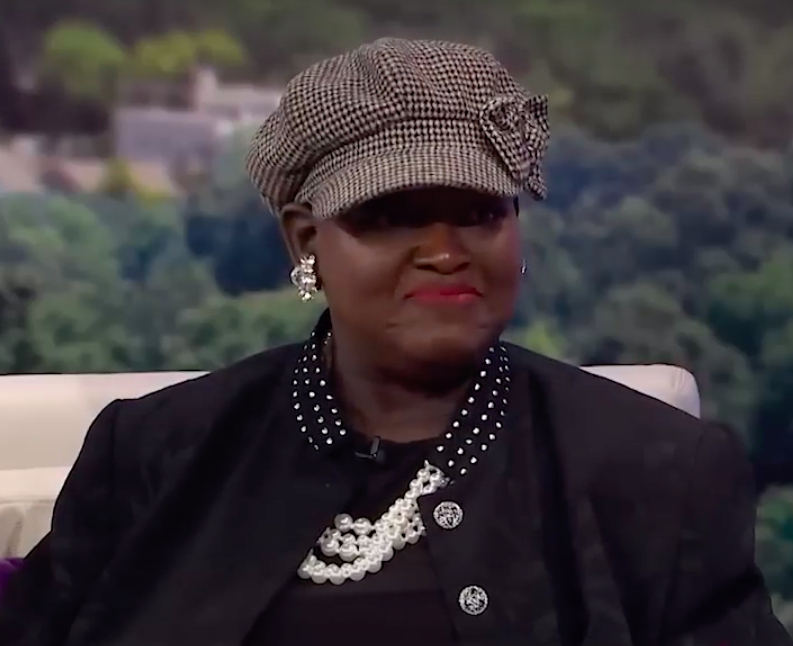
- Pace in 2020

Background information
- Born: May 13, 1958; Atlanta, Georgia, US
- Died: January 14, 2021 (aged 62)
- Genres: Gospel
- Occupations: Singer; songwriter; evangelist

Duranice Ann Pace (13 May 1958 – 14 January 2021) was an American songwriter, evangelist, gospel singer and member of The Anointed Pace Sisters.

== Early life and education ==
Pace was born in Atlanta, Georgia, to pastor Murphy Pace, Jr. and Bettie Ann Pace, and raised in the Poole Creek community. She was the couple's second of ten children and their first daughter. Her father sang as a professional quartet singer for the Gospel Starlights and her mother also sang in church services.

She graduated from Walter F. George High School in Atlanta, Georgia (now known as South Atlanta High School), and continued her education at the O.R.M. Word Processing School and Andrew College. There, she studied and majored in music under a music scholarship.

== Career ==
Pace's singing style was inspired in part by Broadway musicals and plays.

The Anointed Pace Sisters released their first album in 1989, titled It's Morning Time. Duranice Pace sang both alto and soprano on this record. The group went on to release seven albums under two labels during their time performing. As a member of the group, Pace toured across the country and with Bobby Jones and his Nashville Super Choir.

In 2019, Pace appeared on The Steve Harvey Show and spoke with host Steve Harvey. She was also featured in numerous viral videos featuring her singing in public places and with her family. In 2020, she authored an autobiography titled "Poison to Purpose: A Gospel Legend's Journey."

== Death ==
Pace died on January 14, 2021, at the age of 62 due to health complications.

== Personal life ==
Pace had one son, Demarcus Wardell Love.

== Discography ==
- It's Morning Time (1989)*
- In the Hands of God (1990)*
- U-Know (1992)*
- My Purpose (1995)*
- It's Already Done (2003)*
- Return (2006)*
- Access Granted (2009)*
- Just Duranice (2013)
- The Making of a Soldier (2019) *As member of The Anointed Pace Sisters.

== Awards and nominations ==
=== Stellar Awards ===
The Stellar Awards are awarded annually by SAGMA. Pace received 7 nominations as part of The Anointed Pace Sisters.

Year	Award	Nominated work	Result
2008	Group or Duo of the Year	Return	Nominated
2008	Traditional CD of the Year	Return	Nominated
2008	Traditional Group or Duo of the Year	Return	Nominated
2011	Group or Duo of the Year	Access Granted	Nominated
2011	Praise and Worship CD of the Year	Access Granted	Nominated
2011	Traditional Group/Duo of the Year	Access Granted	Nominated
2011	Music Video of the Year	"If I Be Lifted Up"	Nominated

=== Miscellaneous awards and honors ===
Year	Organization	Award	Nominated work	Result
2015	BMI Trailblazers of Gospel Music Awards	Trailblazer of Gospel Music	The Antointed Pace Sisters	Honored
2025	National Convention of Gospel Choirs & Choruses	Thomas A Dorsey Lifetime Achievement Award	The Antointed Pace Sisters	Honored
