= Come On Down to My Boat =

Single by Every Mother's Son

from the album Every Mother's Son
- B-side: "I Believe in You"
- Released: April 22, 1967
- Genre: Garage rock
- Length: 2:33
- Label: MGM
- Songwriters: Jerry Goldstein, Wes Farrell
- Producer: Wes Farrell

Every Mother's Son singles chronology
"Come On Down to My Boat" (1967)	"Put Your Mind at Ease" (1967)

"Come On Down to My Boat" is a song written by Jerry Goldstein and Wes Farrell and performed by Every Mother's Son. Their only top 40 hit, it reached No. 6 on the Billboard Hot 100 in 1967, and appeared on their self-titled debut album; on the album the track was titled "Come and Take a Ride in My Boat". This same title was used by the Rare Breed who released their version the previous year, in September 1966.

The song was produced by Wes Farrell and was ranked No. 22 on Billboard magazine's Top Hot 100 songs of 1967.

This basic song is about liberation, involving an unnamed girl who is a fisherman's daughter, who is stranded and tied up in a boat on the dock, where a young man wants to cut that rope, telling her to come on down to his boat, where they would have fun playing and sailing away from her over protective father. Metaphorically it suggests living a much more carefree overall life than she currently leads.

The song was back in the news in 1987, when pirate radio station Radio Newyork International played the record as its first-ever musical selection. (Unfortunately for RNI, federal authorities took the hint and raided the boat from where the station was broadcasting, arresting the staff and terminating the operation.)
