= Tim Tam and the Turn-Ons =

1960s American rock band

Tim Tam and The Turn-On's were a 1960s American rock band. They hailed from Allen Park, Michigan. The group consisted of Rick Wiesend, Dan Wiesend, John Ogen, Don Grundman, Earl Rennie and Nick Butsicaris.

== History ==
The group assembled while studying at Allen Park High School. The group's name came from the racehorse "Tim Tam" at the Derby in Kentucky and the phrase "Turn-On" which was popular at the time. Management was by CKLW-AM and WNIC-FM DJ Johnny Williams, also known as Tom DeAngelo.

The group recorded singles, including "Cheryl Ann", "Kimberly" and "Don't Say Hi" (all for Palmer Records), but are best known for "Wait A Minute," which according to Billboard, peaked at #76 on the Billboard national chart in 1966 and was voted #40 of “The Top 100 of the ‘60s” by North American listeners of big8radio.com in 2019. “Wait a Minute" was recorded in December 1965 at United Sound Systems. The flip-side is an instrumental titled "Opelia".

The young music group The Satellites had just finished recording their demo. They were all freshmen attending Allen Park High School. From Pioneer Studios, The Satellites released two singles: “I’ll Feel a Whole Lot Better” and “You Really Got a Hold on Me”. During this time, Dave Fero, Danny Tyrell and Frank Schiavulli were playing with Tim Tam and the Turn-On's. The two styles merged with success, and "Wait a Minute," brought a contemporary rock-meets-doo-wop sound that resonated with the kids. Lead Vocalist Rick Wiesend (Tim Tam) along with vocalists Danny Wiesend, Don Grundman, Nick Butsicaris, John Ogen and Earl Rennie were the key to popularity. (2008)

The song was released in February 1966 as Palmer Records 5002. It sold 30,000 copies in the first month of release. Frank was interviewed by WKNR DJ Scott Regan about the drum part.

Tim Tam & the Turn-On's released their next single, “Cheryl Ann,” as an homage to doo-wop. The b-side to "Cheryl Ann" featured the song "Seal it with a Kiss".

Not long after the release of "Cheryl Ann", on June 13, 1966, the Satellites went to United Sound Studios to record a demo of “I Believe” and “Midnight Hour”. This demo was mixed by Les Cooley, who would soon engineer "Persecution Smith" by Bob Seger. After releasing the demo, The Satellites won WXYZ-TV's Talent Town competition. The top prize was a stereo console they decided to keep in Vargo's basement, where they rehearsed.

Tim Tam and the Turn-On's released three more 45s on Palmer. When the band parted ways, Rick Wiesand dropped the name Tim Tam in favor or Rick Reas, Rick Reason and the Satellites released, "I Feel So Bad," backed with "I'll Always Remember", Mar-Vel 3300. The single was re-issued in the 1970s with "Please Me" replacing the original b-side, with "Please Me," while keeping the label number. "Please Me," was the lead single b/w "Two and Two are Four," released in 1965 as Rick Reason and His 1965 Million Seller.

Rene Cizio of the News-Herald stated, "The group invested in an apartment community, Allen Park Apartments, which were once owned by Rick "Tim Tam" Weisend and his brother, Danny."

Rick died October 22, 2003, from cancer and in 2009, a “reverse ribbon cutting” celebration was held during the demolition of the Tim Tam Apartments. They had once incorporated Motown music, but were condemned upon Weisend's death. The city could not get the new owner to make repairs after several attempts. Nothing was fixed and the building was no longer safe.

== Discography ==
- I Feel So Bad (b/w) I'll Always Remember (as Rick Reason and The Satellites) (MAR-VEL 3300 1965) //
- Please Me (b/w) Two And Two Are Four (as Rick Reason and His 1965 Million Seller) (GLENN 3301 1965) //
- Wait A Minute (b/w) Opelia (instrumental) (PALMER 5002 1965) //
- Cheryl Ann (b/w) Seal It With A Kiss (PALMER 5003 1966) //
- Kimberly (b/w) I Leave You In Tears (PALMER 5006 1966) //
- Don't Say Hi (vocal) (b/w) Don't Say Hi (instrumental) (as Tim Tam) (PALMER 5014 1967) //
- I Feel So Bad (b/w) Please Me (MAR-VELL 3300 197?)
