= Every Mother's Son =

1960s American pop band

- Standing: Christopher Augustine and Lary Larden; Sitting: Bruce Milner, Dennis Larden, and Schuyler Larsen

Background information
- Origin: New York City, United States
- Genre: Sunshine pop
- Years active: 1966–1968
- Label: MGM
- Past members: Dennis Larden; Marc Antoine; Lary Larden; Bruce Milner; Christopher Augustine; Schuyler Larsen; Don Kerr

Every Mother's Son was an American sunshine pop band formed in New York City in 1966. Coming from a folk rock background situated in Greenwich Village, the group scored their only Top 40 hit "Come On Down to My Boat" in 1967. Following their brief commercial success, Every Mother's Son achieved lesser fortunes with songs such as "Put Your Mind at Ease" and "Pony with the Golden Mane", and recorded two studio albums before disbanding in 1968.

== History ==
The nucleus of Every Mother's Son formed in early 1966, when brothers Lary (vocals, guitar) and Dennis Larden (vocals, guitar) met Bruce Milner (organ, piano) at a Greenwich Village nightclub. The Larden brothers had previous experience playing four years together as a folk duo for engagements in Greenwich Village's burgeoning music scene. During this time they played all types of engagements, from private parties to Village night clubs. They worked only weekends since school and homework took up the other days of the week. Milner had also spent time performing with various folk bands, but desired to involve himself with a group long-term.

Early in 1966 they decided that they would have more scope for musical growth as members of a rock group. Through a mutual friend they heard about a young musician named Bruce Milner, who, after a number of years as an organist with various groups, was looking for a permanent affiliation. Lary, Dennis, and Bruce met one night in Greenwich Village, took to each other, and decided on the spot to form a rock group of their own. Within a week they added a bass player, Schuyler Larson, and a drummer, Christopher Augustine.

The group spent a month rehearsing, writing new songs, working together until they felt they were ready with their sound and ready to be seen professionally. They contacted Peter Leeds, young manager of record acts, who knew The Larden Brothers from their old folk duo days. They asked him to watch them perform at a college fraternity party, one that the boys had booked themselves. Leeds came to watch them, was strongly impressed, and signed them to a management contract.

Peter Leeds put them in touch with writer-producer Wes Farrell in the summer of 1966. Their meeting with Farrell was their first major step on the road to fame (a little) and fortune (perhaps less). Farrell was a songwriter and record producer who had composed songs such as "Hang on Sloopy", "Boys", and "Come a Little Bit Closer". Farrell had the boys audition for him in a small studio in a ramshackle building off Broadway. After climbing three flights of stairs with their instruments and amplifiers in the 90-degree heat that July day, Every Mother's Son were so exhausted that they forgot to be nervous. They came through so excitingly at the audition that the hard-bitten Wes Farrell immediately signed them to record for his Senate Records Productions firm. He cut twelve sides, an unheard-of practice with a new group, and took their records to a number of top record firms. Within a week five major labels were competing to distribute their records, and finally a deal was completed for Every Mother's Son records to be released by MGM. MGM Records signed the group as a clean-cut alternative to the 1960s counterculture.

Late in 1966, Every Mother's Son recorded the Farrell and Jerry Goldstein-penned song "Come On Down to My Boat", originally released by the garage rock band The Rare Breed (who became The Ohio Express) under the title "Come and Take a Ride in My Boat" earlier in the year. An almost instant favorite on American pop radio stations, Every Mother's Son's take on the song reached number six on the Billboard Hot 100 in July 1967. Because the group was signed to MGM, not only did the band appear on several nationally televised programs to promote the single, they also were featured in a two-part episode of The Man from U.N.C.L.E. (series 3) entitled "The Five Daughters Affair", the combined episodes were also released as the movie "The Karate Killers". A self-titled studio album, featuring mainly original material as well as their hit single, followed soon after, and became a modest commercial success, peaking at number 117 on the Billboard 200. Much of the music on the album was described as "clean summer rock (with almost imperceptible echoes of The Beach Boys and The Association)".

Although Every Mother's Son never again managed to attain commercial success that paralleled "Come On Down to My Boat", they flirted with the national charts throughout the remainder of the year. MGM Records quickly distributed their second album Every Mother's Son's Back in late 1967, spawning three charting singles, "Put Your Mind at Ease" (number 46), "Pony with the Golden Mane" (number 93), and "No One Knows" (number 96), but the album itself failed to sell in sufficient quantities to chart. Schuyler Larsen departed Every Mother's Son following the release of their sophomore effort, and was replaced by Don Kerr. In 1968 work commenced on a third album; however, the group disbanded by the end of the year. Dennis Larden later joined Ricky Nelson's Stone Canyon Band. In 1998, Collectables Records distributed the compilation album The Very Best of Every Mother's Son: Come on Down to My Boat. In 2012 a CD of both MGM albums and a bonus non-album single was issued by Now Sounds as "Come On Down: The Complete MGM Recordings" using the original master tapes.

One member, Bruce Milner, is now a dentist in both Manhattan, New York and Woodstock.

Bassist Schuyler Larsen died on December 19, 2021.

== Members ==
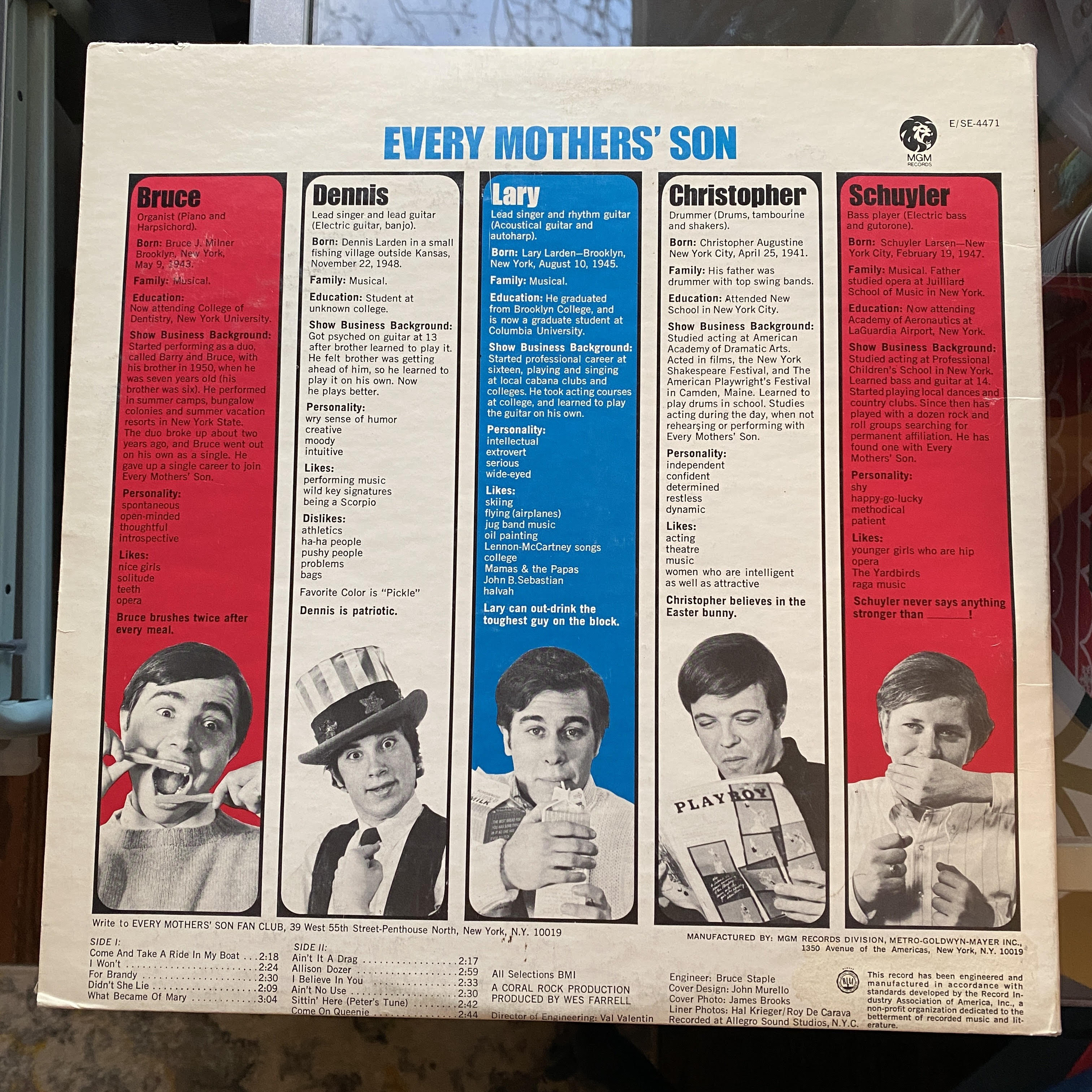

The back of their debut record (which was self-titled) included a profile for each member.

- Dennis Larden – lead singer and lead guitar (electric guitar, banjo)
  - Born in a small fishing village outside Kansas on November 22, 1948
  - Got psyched on guitar at 13 after brother learned to play it. He felt brother was getting ahead of him, so he learned to play it on his own.
  - Personality – wry sense of humor, creative, moody, intuitive
  - Likes – performing music, wild key signatures, being a Scorpio
  - Dislikes – athletics, ha-ha people, pushy people, problems, bags
  - Favorite color is "pickle"
  - Dennis is patriotic.
- Lary Larden – lead singer and rhythm guitar (acoustical guitar and autoharp)
  - Born in Brooklyn, New York on August 10, 1945
  - Graduated from Brooklyn College and did graduate school at Columbia University
  - Started professional career in music at sixteen, playing and singing at local cabana clubs and colleges. He took acting courses at college and learned to play the guitar on his own.
  - Personality – intellectual, extrovert, serious, wide-eyed
  - Likes – skiing, flying (airplanes), jug band music, oil painting, Lennon-McCartney songs, college, Mamas & the Papas, John B. Sebastian, halvah
  - Lary can out-drink the toughest guy on the block.
- Bruce Milner – organist (piano and harpsichord)
  - Born in Brooklyn, New York on May 9, 1943
  - Attended the College of Dentistry at New York University
  - Started performing as a duo, called Barry and Bruce, with his brother in 1950, when he was seven years old (his brother was six). He performed in summer camps, bungalow colonies and summer vacation resorts in New York State. The duo broke up about two years ago, and Bruce went out on his own as a single. He gave up a single career to join Every Mother’s Son.
  - Personality – spontaneous, open-minded, thoughtful, introspective
  - Likes – nice girls, solitude, teeth, opera
  - Bruce brushes twice after ever meal.
- Christopher Augustine –drummer (drums, tambourine, and shakers)
  - Born in New York City on April 25, 1941
  - His father was drummer with top swing bands
  - Attended New School in New York City
  - Studied acting at American Academy of Dramatic Arts. Acted in films, the New York Shakespeare Festival, and the American Playwright's Festival in Camden, Maine. Learned to play drums in school. Studies acting during the day, when not rehearsing or performing with Every Mother’s Son.
  - Personality – independent, confident, determined, restless, dynamic
  - Likes – acting, theatre, music, women who are intelligent as well as attractive
  - Christopher believes in the Easter bunny.
- Schuyler Larsen – bass player (electric bass and gutorone)
  - Born in New York City on February 19, 1947
  - Father studied opera at Juilliard School of Music in New York
  - Attended the Academy of Aeronautics at LaGuardia Airport, New York
  - Studied acting at Professional Children's School in New York. Learned bass and guitar at 14. Started playing local dances and country clubs. Since then has played with a dozen rock and roll groups searching for permanent affiliation. He has found one with Every Mother’s Son.
  - Personality – shy, happy-go-lucky, methodical, patient
  - Likes – younger girls who are hip, opera, The Yardbirds, raga music
  - Schuyler never says anything stronger than ____!
- Don Kerr – bass guitar

== Discography ==
=== Albums ===
Year	Album	Billboard 200	Record label
1967	Every Mother's Son	117	MGM Records
1967	Every Mother's Son's Back	–	MGM Records
1998	The Very Best of Every Mother's Son: Come on Down to My Boat	–	Collectables Records
2012	Come on Down: The Complete MGM Recordings	–	Now Sounds Records

=== Singles ===
Year	Title	Peak chart positions			Record Label	B-side	Album
Year	Title	US	CA	AU	Record Label	B-side	Album
1967	"Come on Down to My Boat"	6	3	26	MGM Records	"I Believe in You"	Every Mother's Son
1967	"Put Your Mind at Ease"	46	8	–	MGM Records	"The Proper Four Leaf Clover"	Every Mother's Son's Back
1967	"Pony with the Golden Mane"	93	41	–	MGM Records	"Dolls in the Clock"	Every Mother's Son's Back
1968	"No One Knows"	96	–	–	MGM Records	"What Became of Mary"	
1968	"Rainflowers"	–	–	–	MGM Records	"For Brandy"	Every Mother's Son's Back

== See also ==
- The Phynx, a 1970 movie with Dennis Larden
