= Karol Mikloš discography =

- Studio albums: 3
- EPs: 1
- Singles: 11
- Music videos: 3
- Other appearances: 19

The discography of Karol Mikloš, a Slovak singer-songwriter, consists of four studio albums, two EPs, twelve singles, three music videos and nineteen additional appearances.

== Albums ==
=== Studio albums ===
Year	Album	Notes
1997	The Same Mist Here: Release date: 13 November 1997; Label: G.A. (#GR 0013 2 311); Format: CD	Thirteen-track release record producer by Ladislav Lučenič, including a hidden cover of "Some Girls Are Bigger Than Others" by The Smiths, adapted for "Some Boys Are Bigger Than Others" by Mikloš. All songs performed in English.
2002	Vis-à-vis: Release date: 21 October 2002; Label: Millenium (#834 015-4); Format: CD	Twelve-track release recorded from 1999 to 2002, featuring five compositions in his native language. Produced by Andrej Monček, himself and Roman Hlubina, the set included two music videos, "Celý" and "Tomorrow" from 1997.
2008	The Past of the Future: Release date: 20 May 2008; Label: Deadred (#DR-L009) • Starcastic (STC009); Format: CD • download	Ten-track release produced by Matúš Homola and himself, along with co-production by Andrej Gmuca. All songs performed in English.

== EPs ==
Year	EP	Notes
1996	Karol Mikloš: Released: 1996; Label: G.A. (#GR 0007 2 311); Format: CD	Originally a demo from 1994 issued on tape upon its initial release. In 1996 reissued as part of 4EP/1CD by VA.
2017	Poisoned EP: Scheduled for release on 20 February 2017; Label: Deadred Records/Starcastic Records; Format: 12'' vinyl, digital download, stream	Upcoming title including the track "One Life More or Less" released as a 7" single on 2015 Record Store Day and the lead single "Poison" to be available on 28 November 2016.

== Singles ==
Year	Single	Charts		Album
Year	Single	SK		Album
Year	Single	50	100	Album
1997	"Tomorrow" (#GR 0012 6 311)	—	—	The Same Mist Here
2002	"Všetko, čo smieme chcieť"	—	—	Vis-à-vis
2002	"Celý"	—	—	Vis-à-vis
2002	"Where You Meet Yourself"	—	—	Vis-à-vis
2003	"Uspávanka"	—	—	Vis-à-vis
2006	"Insane"	—	—	The Past of the Future
2008	"Leaving for England"	33	—	The Past of the Future
2008	"You Never Listen"	26	—	The Past of the Future
2008	"In the Bubble"	40	—	The Past of the Future
2009	"Apocalyptical"	30	—	The Past of the Future
2015	"One Life More or Less" (#DR-031/STC-50)	—	—	Non-album single
2016	"Poison"	—	—	Poisoned EP

== Other appearances ==
Year	Title	Notes
1994	"London"	Originally pre-released on Compilation of New Slovak Rock Groups 2 (G.A., #GR 0004 2 311).
1996	"There Are Some Bad..."	Compilation of New Slovak Rock Groups 3 (G.A., #GR 0006 2 311).
1997	"Čierny deň"	A track written by Kamil Peteraj and Miroslav Žbirka, issued with "There Are Some Bad..." as the B-side to the CDS "Tomorrow".
2002	"Cyberdelia" (by Shellwoy)	Tracks recorded for the debut album of the band (Millenium, No. 834 010-9).
2002	"Here We Are" (by Shellwoy; guitar-only)	Tracks recorded for the debut album of the band (Millenium, No. 834 010-9).
2003	"Posteľ" (Melancholic Mix) (by Smola a Hrušky)	Remix credits, a bonus on Jeseň 2003 (Millenium, #834024-6).
2006	"Insane" (Radio Version)	Bažant Pohoda, a VA compilation issued by SME/Zlatý Bažant.
2006	"Organizmy" (Second Nature Mix) (by Nocadeň)	Remix credits shared with A. Monček; Retrospektíva (Sony BMG).
2007	The Love (by Shellwoy)	Thirteen-track release; credited as a co-producer, songwriter, engineer and programmer (G.A., #GR 0022 2 311).
2008	"You Never Listen" (Nylon Union Mix)	A promotional remix issued on VA compilation Fresh Style.
2008	"Tanga" (Tango Mix) (by Smola a Hrušky)	Appears as bonus tracks on Kameň Papier Nožnice (Musica, No. 720 5117-2).
2008	"Tanga" (Daybreak Mix) (by Smola a Hrušky)	Appears as bonus tracks on Kameň Papier Nožnice (Musica, No. 720 5117-2).
2009	"On Fire" (Millex Mix)	Appears on VA compilation Zvuková Vlna Slovensko 5 (Vlna/4 mg, #R 1 44 0007 2 31).
2010	Big Now! (by Youcoco)	Co-production credits (Deadred, #DR-L014).
2011	"Life Is a Full-time Job"	Appears on VA compilation Ten Deadred (Deadred, #DR-C019).
2011	Deaf Till 30 (EP by Jelly Belly)	Recording and mix credits (Deadred, #DR-E017).
2012	Über Alles (EP by Jelly Belly)	Recording, mix and mastering credits (Deadred, #DR-020-1).
2012	"Life Is a Full-time Job" (Young Parents Mix)	Appears on the DogDocs' documentary O mladých rodičoch 2.
2013	Dawntempo (by Xavier Baumaxa)	Songwriting, engineering, mix and mastering credits.
denotes production credits-only.

== Videos ==
=== Music videos ===
Year	Single	director
1997	"Tomorrow"	Branislav Špaček
2002	"Celý"	Branislav Špaček
2015	"One Life More or Less"	—N/a
