= Tommy Cash (rapper) =

Estonian singer and visual artist (born 1991)

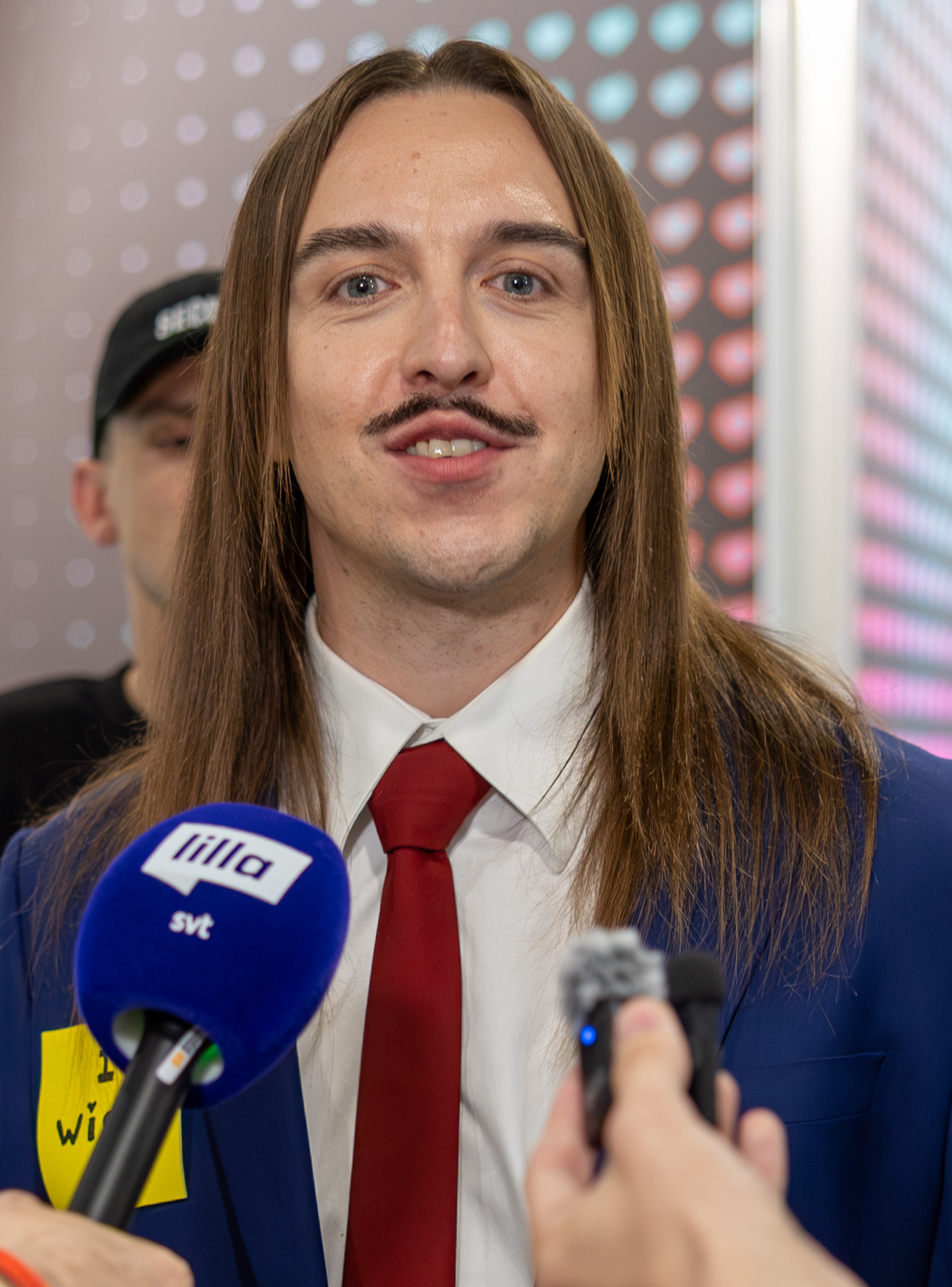
- Tommy Cash in Basel in 2025

Background information
- Also known as: Kanye East; Don Tomasso; Toomas Sularaha
- Born: Tomas Tammemets; 18 November 1991 (age 35); Tallinn, Estonia
- Genres: Hip-hop; experimental hip-hop
- Occupations: Rapper; singer; producer; visual artist; dancer
- Years active: 2012–present
- Website: tommycashshop.com

Tomas Tammemets (born 18 November 1991), known professionally as Tommy Cash (stylised as TOMM¥ €A$H), is an Estonian rapper, singer, dancer, and visual artist. He usually performs in English with a distinct non-native accent, and is known for sexually explicit lyrical themes and provocative music videos. He represented Estonia in the Eurovision Song Contest 2025 with the song "Espresso Macchiato", where he finished in third place overall with 356 points.

== Early life and education ==
Tammemets was born and raised in Estonia, in Kopli, a subdistrict of Tallinn, the capital. In interviews, Tammemets mentioned his mixed immigrant "Ukrainian-Kazakh-Russian-Estonian" ancestry. He described in detail his mixed roots from his grandparents: Estonian, Ukrainian, Russian, and Kazakh. Tammemets went to Estonian school and he speaks Estonian as one of his mother languages. In one of his early interviews, he said that "not many even know I can speak Russian", that his parents talked to each other in Russian at home, and that he comes from the Kopli ghetto.

In childhood, Tammemets recounted running away from the police many times, and (his parents) then having to pay a fine for painting illegal graffiti. He said that his marijuana use led him to be "ejected" from schooling. Although his family spoke only Russian at home, he also learned the Estonian language early on in the local preschool, primary school and basic school. He never graduated from upper secondary school, despite sitting final exams, and later took up painting and dancing instead of formal education.

== Music career ==
=== 2012–2015: First releases ===
In 2012, Tammemets released his first songs on SoundCloud including "Dusk", "Oldkool", and "Toxic". Using the stylised pseudonym TOMM¥ €A$H, his first live performance took place at Cafe Peterson in Tallinn, on 7 December 2012. In 2013, he released the soundtracks "Deep Purp" and "Oldkool" (which was used in video advertisements shown at the ERKI Fashion Show) and he performed at the Patarei Kultuuritolm festival in Tallinn. The weekly Eesti Ekspress remarked, "with his nasal voice and androgynous quacking he looked more like a cartoon character than the serious self-assertive macho rapper we are used to". During this year, he also released his first music video, "Guez Whoz Bak", directed by Janar Aronija. "Guez Whoz Bak" later received the Hit of the Year 2013 (R2 Aastahitt 2013) award from Estonian radio station Raadio 2.

Two of Tommy Cash's collaborations with Justicious and Ba., "MTWAH" and "Kongo Jungle" with TV Maskava, were released as part of the Baltic Trail Compilation (on vinyl). In December 2013, he performed at the Żubroffka Short Film Festival in Poland. In 2014, Tommy Cash released the single "Alien Tears". It was soon followed by C.R.E.A.M. EP, an extended play (EP) release including "Alien Tears", "No Afterparty Without You" and other previously released tracks. In September 2014, he released the music video for "Euroz Dollaz Yeniz", the first single from his upcoming studio album. On 1 November 2014, his first studio album, Euroz Dollaz Yeniz (2014), was released digitally. In January 2015, having lost annual awards in two categories (he had been nominated for Music Video of the Year and Hip Hop/Rap Album of the Year), Tommy Cash posted on Instagram: "Suck my balls Estonian Music Awards."

Tommy Cash was featured on the single "Flipperi" on Mäkki's studio album Habiturientti, released in January 2015. In 2015, he also released "Prorapsuperstar" and "Leave Me Alone" music videos. In September 2015, he collaborated with Ilya "Ilich" Prusikin and Alina Pyazok to produce a video for "Give Me Your Money", a song by the Russian punk-rave group Little Big. The video became part of the American Russians six-episode web series released on Youtube in September-October 2015. He was featured in the song and video "Volkswagen Passat" produced by Sergey Mezhentsev (DJ Oguretz) for the album Power, released in Moscow in October 2015.

=== 2016–2017: Breakthrough with Winaloto ===
In July 2016, Tommy Cash uploaded a new trap-pop single, titled "Winaloto", to SoundCloud. An accompanying music video was directed by Tommy Cash himself, produced by Ivan Nezhentsev (also known as stereoRYZE) in Saint Petersburg, Russia, and premiered two weeks later on 19 July 2016. "Winaloto" received over 16 million views on YouTube as of February 2025. Maxim observed "it's a flesh-filled orgy not for the faint of heart, but if you're game to get a little weird, definitely watch it" Dazed reported that "the video ... pairs intricate choreography with deliberate gross-out moments." In October 2016, a ColorsxStudios show premiered Tommy Cash's performance of "Winaloto". He won the Estonian Music Award for Music Video of the Year (2016) for "Winaloto".

Also in 2016, Tommy Cash performed as a special guest at the official residence of the then President of Estonia Toomas Hendrik Ilves. In October 2016, he uploaded two new songs, "Orange Soda" and "Escalade" to SoundCloud. In January 2017, Tommy Cash performed in the Eurosonic Noorderslag in Groningen, the Netherlands. On 16 March 2017, he released the music video for "Surf", produced by Anna-Lisa Himma and directed by Tommy Cash. He also performed on the 2017 Õllesummer pop music festival in Tallinn. In July 2017, he made a cameo appearance on Charli XCX's "Boys" music video. His new single, "Rawr", was first released in September 2017, and soon followed by the official remix featuring Joji. In October, Tommy Cash collaborated with Russian electronic music duo IC3PEAK on their song "Cry". In December 2017, Tommy Cash featured on Charli XCX's "Delicious" (Pop 2 mixtape), and on a remix of her "Out of My Head".

=== 2018–2020: "Pussy Money Weed", "Little Molly", and ¥€$ ===
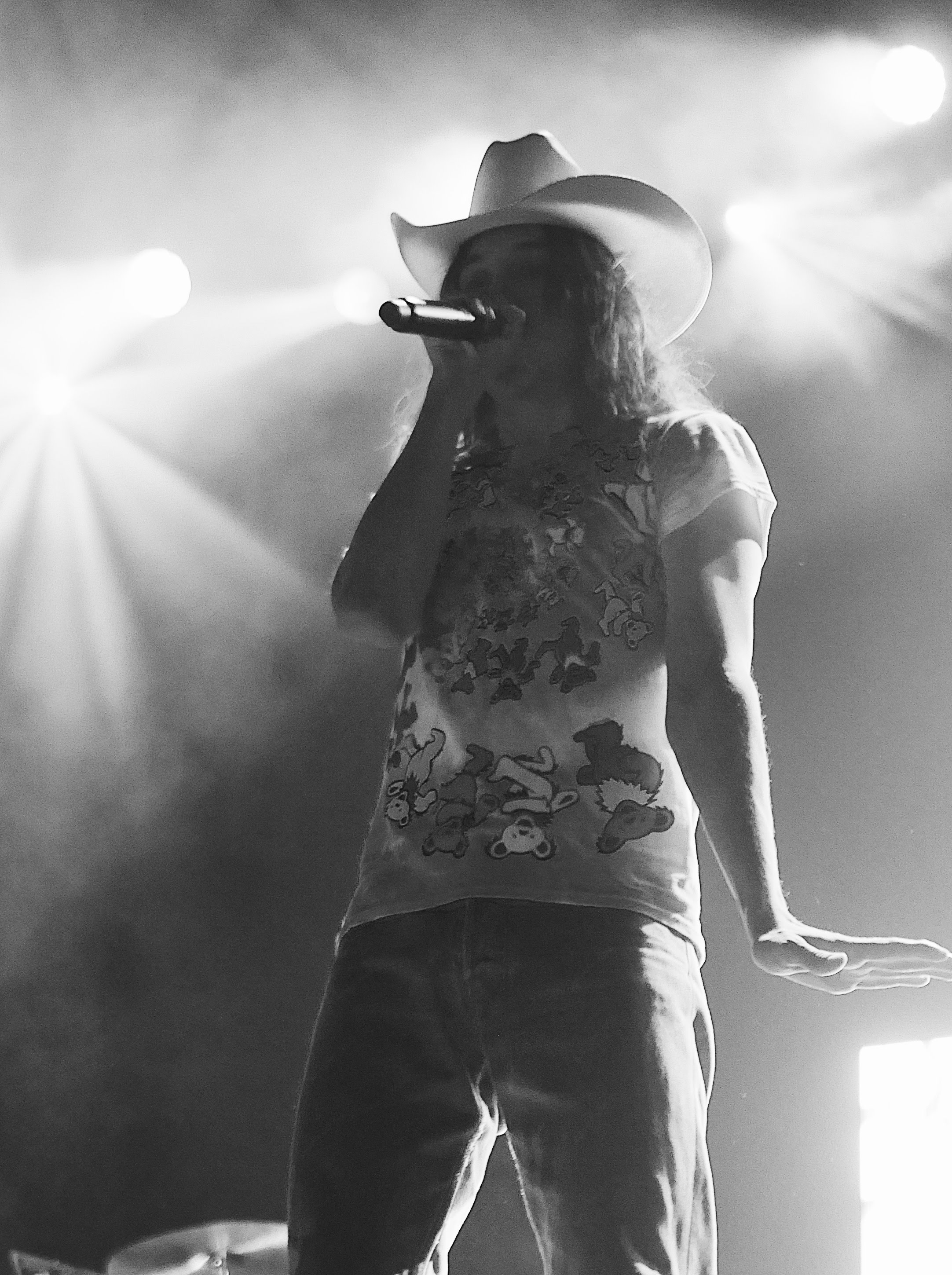
Tommy Cash performing at the Fox Oakland Theatre, September 2019

At the 20th Estonian Music Awards on 25 January 2018, Tommy Cash's "Surf" won the award for Music Video of the Year. In the beginning 2018, he released a single titled "Pussy Money Weed", alongside the music video, which was described as "a hymn to diversity" by Giulia Pacciardi of Collater.Al Italy. At the EFTA Awards on 2 April 2018, Tommy Cash performed his new song "Little Molly". On 30 May 2018, he released "Little Molly" as a new single, alongside the music video, directed by Anna-Lisa Himma and himself. As of July 2024, "Pussy Money Weed", and "Little Molly" music videos received over 15 and 17 million views on YouTube, respectively.

In October 2018, Tommy Cash collaborated with Little Big to release "Follow Me" for Little Big's fourth studio album Antipositive, Pt. 2. It marked the second collaboration between him and the Russian punk-rave group following their 2015 single "Give Me Your Money". In November 2018, Tommy Cash released a song and video, "X-Ray", and it was then set as the lead single of his second studio album ¥€$ (2018). The album features vocal performances from MC Bin Laden, Charli XCX, Rick Owens and Caroline Polachek; it was co-produced by Danny L Harle, A. G. Cook, Amnesia Scanner, and Boys Noize. The concert tour to support the ¥€$ album was announced in December 2018. The tour was to encompass 33 shows and 17 countries. Charli XCX joined Tommy Cash to perform "Cool 3D World" and "Delicious" during his concert in Tallinn in December 2018.

At the 2019 Tomorrowland festival, Tommy Cash was joined by Bosnian-Swedish DJ Salvatore Ganacci to perform "Heartbass" and "X-Ray". Also in 2019, he toured as a special guest at Oliver Tree's concerts on the Goodbye, Farewell Tour, in over 20 shows in the US and Canada. In December 2019, he released the "Sdubid" music video. On 30 January 2020, Tommy Cash unveiled his first official tour in the United States, starting on 22 March. Due to the COVID-19 pandemic in the United States, the tour was rescheduled for 2022. In 2020, Cash also appeared in the music video for "S*ck My D*ck 2020" by the Russian rave band Little Big.

=== 2021–2024: Moneysutra ===
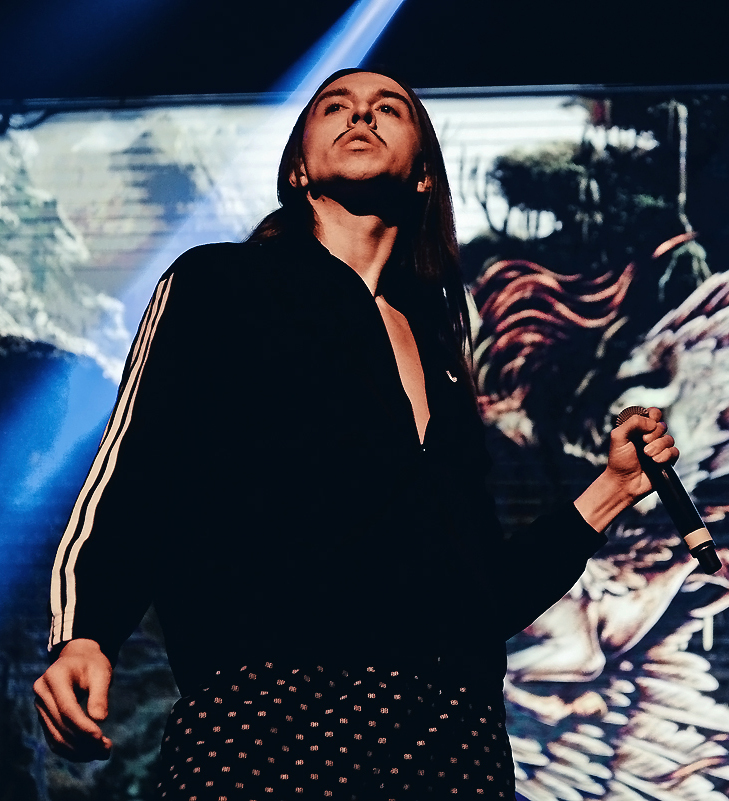
Tommy Cash performing in Saint Petersburg, Russia (concert in club Morze, March 2020)

In April 2021, Tommy Cash released the single "Zuccenberg", in collaboration with Suicideboys and Diplo. A five-song Moneysutra EP was released on 9 April 2021, with guest appearances from Suicideboys, Diplo, Riff Raff, Bones, and Alexey Uzenyuk (also known as Eldzhey). In the summer of 2021, Tommy Cash released a song and video "Benz-Dealer" in collaboration with Quebonafide. He was also featured on Boys Noize's track "Nude".

In September 2021, Tommy Cash collaborated with Oliver Tree and Little Big on the track and video "Turn It Up", from their collaborative Welcome to the Internet EP, which was released on the same month. The following month, he was the featured part in Umru's "Check1", the lead single from the Estonian-American producer's first studio album, Comfort Noise (2022), along with a music video.

In December 2021, new tour dates with additional venues in North America and Europe were announced. The Biggest and Strongest World Tour (2022), began on 10 February 2022, in San Francisco, and was originally to have 19 shows in North America and 28 shows in Europe, ending on 6 May 2022 in Tallinn. In April 2022, the three Australian dates were confirmed. The show in Perth was added later.

March 2022 saw the release of Tommy Cash's collaboration with Kazakhstani record producer Imanbek, a bass-heavy trap track "Baby Shock". In August 2022, via his Facebook account, Tommy Cash announced the "Autobahn Tour (2022)", with ten gigs in Germany and Poland. His "The Amerika 2 Tour (2022)", which was to consist of ten shows in the US and Canada, was postponed as his team were denied entry visas.

During Käärijä's 19 August 2023 concert in Helsinki, Tommy Cash joined him on stage to perform "It's Crazy It's Party". Later in 2023, he joined Oliver Tree's world tour. In January 2024, Tommy Cash released the single "Tango", featuring Canadian rapper bbno$. He was featured in a music video by Salvatore Ganacci titled "Ass & Titties", released in July 2024. The third EP released by Tommy Cash, High Fashion (2024), contains production from A. G. Cook, IC3PEAK, and Umru.

=== 2024–present: Eurovision Song Contest and controversies ===
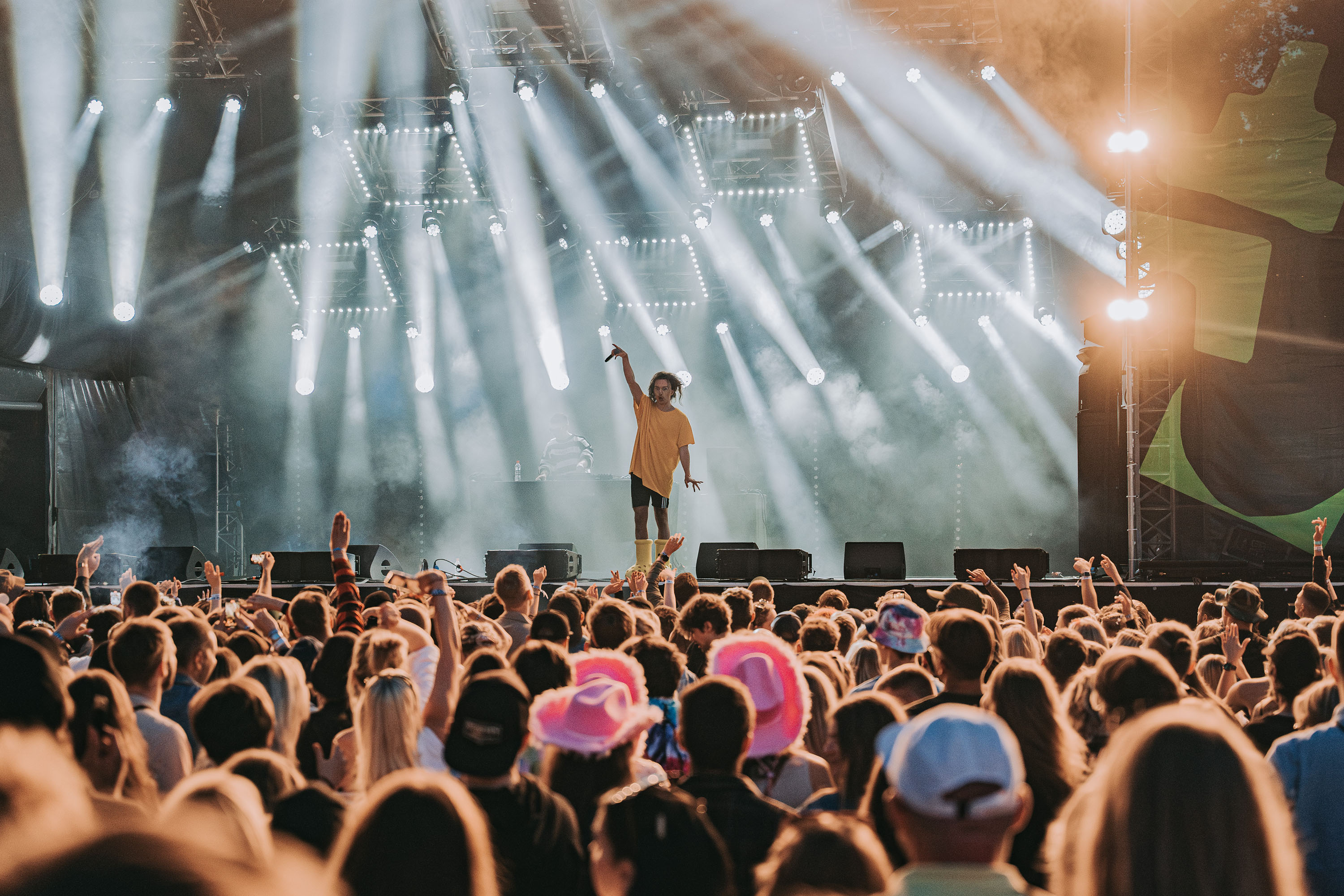
Tommy Cash performing at the Positivus Festival in Riga, July 2023

On 6 November 2024, Tommy Cash was announced as one of the participants in Eesti Laul 2025, Estonia's selection for the Eurovision Song Contest 2025, with the song "Espresso Macchiato". The song was released on 7 December 2024.

"Espresso Macchiato" went on to win Eesti Laul and thus became the Estonian entry for the Eurovision contest in Basel. His Eurovision participation sparked controversy, both with "Espresso Macchiato" receiving backlash by some Italian media outlets and politicians for stereotyping Italians and Italian culture, as well as his own history of performing in Russia and collaborating with Russian artists. Shortly after winning Eesti Laul, Tommy Cash released the single "United by Music", a collaboration with former Dutch Eurovision representative Joost Klein, in which they voiced discontent with the European Broadcasting Union; Klein was disqualified on the eve of the Eurovision final the year prior.

On 9 May, Tommy Cash published a remix of "Espresso Macchiato" together with the Italian rapper Tony Effe. On 13 May, he performed "Espresso Macchiato" in the first semi-final of Eurovision and earned 113 points, placing fifth and qualifying for the grand final. After his performance in the grand final on 17 May, he earned 356 points and placed third, behind Austria and Israel. After the contest, the song charted across Europe and managed to debut at number 93 on Billboard Global 200 singles chart.

== Artistry ==
During his career, Tammemets described himself as a "post-Soviet rapper", with an "Eastern European soul" and a "Scandinavian CV". He also described in detail his mixed roots from his grandparents: Estonian, Ukrainian, Russian, Kazakh, and how he feels about it, and how these difficult feelings manifested in his art. In many interviews, Tammemets described how going to Estonian art school, how Russian language at home, Western music, and his direct environment influenced his art and his music. He previously called himself "Kanye East", and used the name Toomas Sularaha, a literal translation of his stage name.

Characterizing his songs, Vogue Adria's Bojana Jovanović wrote: "Imagine if the Yeezus-era Kanye, Lil B, and Salvador Dalí had a secret jam session in a basement lit by neon lights and glitchy TV screens." She described his music videos as "feverish dreams brought to life, with bizarre, surreal visuals playing with body horror, pop culture, and social commentary—often all at once." Tommy Cash draws significantly upon aspects of white trash culture, in his case the Russian gopnik style. In the dance scene, he is a freestyle dancer with a distinct style, using elements of popping, krumping, and breakdancing.

== Other ventures ==
=== Modelling and fashion week stunts ===
Tommy Cash made his runway modelling debut at the Rick Owens Menswear Spring 2019 show at Paris Fashion Week. He walked the runway at Marine Serre's Fall/Winter 2022/23 show in Paris, and at Jordanluca's Spring/Summer 2024 show in Milan, Italy. Tommy Cash hit the front rows of the show during fashion weeks in Paris and Milan with his performance art in 2022. His first performance was at the Rick Owens' fashion show on 23 June 2022 during Paris Fashion Week Men's 2022, where Tommy Cash wore a nude thong, an overgrown wig and fake toenails. Later, he exercised in the middle of an Amiri catwalk, and became a baby, complete with a person pushing his stroller at the Marine Serre's show. In Fall 2022, he was seen knitting at the Loewe Spring/Summer 2023 fashion show, carried a human backpack during the Rick Owens' parade, and cosplayed a paparazzi at the Balenciaga runway show in Milan.

For me and my team these performances are like anti-fashion, you know? We are not embracing being dressed like brand pros. It's like a Dali approach.

— Tommy Cash during his interview with the Berliner Zeitung in December 2022

At the Diesel Fall/Winter 2023/24 show in Milan, Tommy Cash dressed as a cleaning lady with a mop and bucket. During Paris Fashion Week 2023, he dressed as Anna Wintour at the special event by Isamaya Lips. For the Paco Rabanne fashion show, he filled his face with piercings. Next day, rapper wore a prosthetic vagina and claded in tight "Sue Me" tanktop at Rick Owens' fashion show. On 7 March 2023, he arrived half-asleep, wearing a pristine bedspread and several pillows on his back, at the Y/Project fashion show and, in slippers and blue pajamas, took his front row seat.

In June 2023, Tommy Cash dressed as a contemporary version of French mime artist Marcel Marceau, promoting the new collaboration "Crocs x MSCHF", during the Rick Owens' runway show in Paris. At Marine Serre's Spring 2024 show, he appeared wearing a Cousin Itt-style head-to-toe blonde hair suit. He then attended the Jean Paul GaultierxJulien Dossena haute couture show in a nude muscular suit. He also went to the Doublet show dressed as a dining table replete with sea food, glasses and candles.

In the autumn of 2023, at Diesel's Spring/Summer 2024 show in Milan, Tommy Cash arrived to the event dressed as a homeless person. Elliot Hoste of Dazed, opined: "Cash's homeless cosplay wasn't clever, it was dumb and offensive". According to Tommy Cash himself, he did not wear the outfit to cause a stir, as he had wanted to raise awareness instead. He appeared carrying a sky-high stack of designer boxes and shopping bags at the Maison Margiela Artisanal Couture Spring 2024 show. As part of Paris Fashion Week 2024, at the Vetements Womenswear show, he dressed in an inflatable latex outfit.

=== Artwork ===
Tommy Cash works in different mediums, including music, video, photo installation, sculpture, painting, ready-made, and merchandise. In 2019, he and Rick Owens held a joint exhibition, titled "The Pure and the Damned", at Kumu art museum in Tallinn. Tommy Cash exhibited his own sperm, self-portrait with a pregnant womb, and self-designed bread-based slippers among other artworks. In September 2020, Cash's artworks were presented at the Cosmoscow international fair in Moscow, Russia. In 2022, Tommy Cash presented a solo show with Temnikova & Kasela gallery at Paris Internationale, France. The booth was set up as a tribute to a Russian cartoon, Cheburashka, that had nuclear clouds billowing out from its ears, titled "Nukerashka". In May 2024, his project "Nukerashka" was presented at "Rayon Jouets" exhibition at Hangar Y in Meudon, France. "Nukerashka" sculpture is found at Mia Hotel & Glamping, Saaremaa, Estonia.

=== Design ===
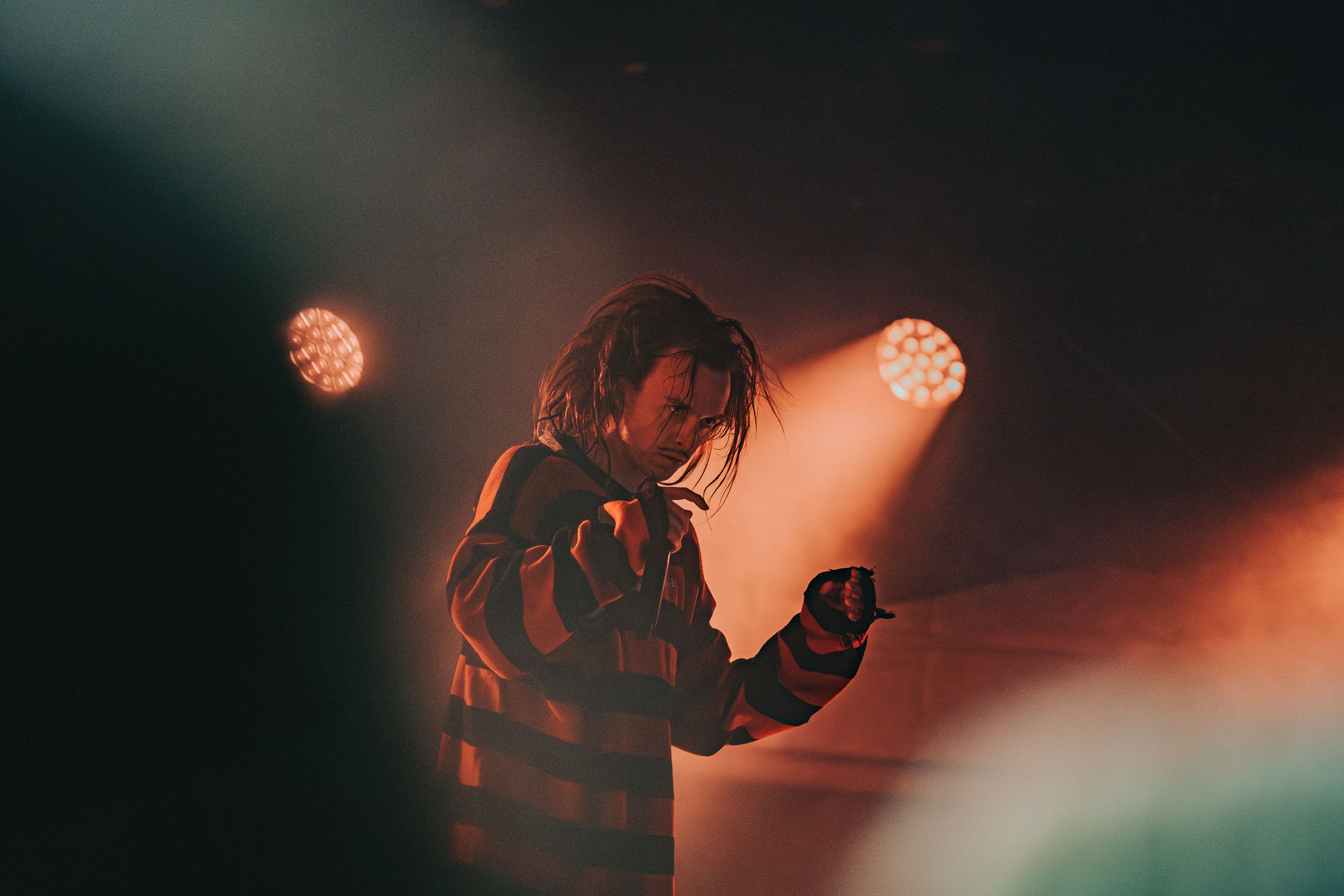
Tommy Cash wearing a red wasted sweater was created in collaboration with Maison Margiela

Early in his career, Tommy Cash made clear his interest in fashion and desire to work in the clothing design industry. In 2018, he released a clothing line that subversively imitates American styles with European elements and in-jokes. Rick Owens teamed up with Tommy Cash for a limited-edition hoodie collaboration in late 2019. In 2021, he put out feelers for a collaboration with IKEA, presenting the bread-shaped sofa paired with a carpet designed by Gab Bois, called "Loafa". Later, IKEA representatives confirmed that was no official collaboration with the rapper, and they also did not see the "Loafa" project as feasible.

Also in 2021, Tommy Cash teamed up with sportswear brand Adidas to create the world's longest sneakers. The metre-long shoes—one white, one black—are a one-off model designed at the request of the artist. He wrot on Instagram: "When I said to adidas that I want to make the longest shoe in the world as our collab, they were like, Wtf, Tommy. But five months later here we are." Daniel Rogers of Dazed opined: "Now, if we're talking COVID restrictions, these sneakers have surely got every social distancing regulation covered. Unfortunately though, us peasants will have to continue to rub up against each other as this gargantuan pair is a one-off, made solely for Cash". Although the extra-long Superstars are a bespoke piece, the rapper's collaboration with Adidas also spawned a more wearable pair of mismatched trainers – one black, one white and both normally sized. A limited number of this pared-back version, which features Tommy Cash's signature laser-engraved on the heel and a yin and yang print on the insole, was made available to the public via a raffle.

In March 2021, Tommy Cash released a capsule collection in collaboration with the fashion house Maison Margiela. А co-branded merchandise line consists bread-based slippers, a parcel of vacuum-packed noodles with the "Tommy Cash x Maison Margiela" logo stamped on it. There was more conventional items in the drop, like a co-branded black hoodie, a striped sweater, a t-shirt. He also released a track to accompany the drop "Mute (by Maison Margiela)", which is three and half minutes of pure silence. In November 2022, Tommy Cash announced his first fashion venture with Italian sportswear brand Kappa. The capsule collection, co-designed by Tommy Cash, consisted of 10 pieces across knitwear, tailoring and outerwear, along with shoes, including an oversized suit, double layered tops, branded loafers, and a leather mask.

=== Appearances in advertisements ===
In 2018, Tommy Cash featured in the LHV Bank commercial. In 2020, he was the face of Adidas for "Superstar – change is a team sport" campaign, also co-starring Russian influencers, musicians, and athletes. In April 2023, Tommy Cash had become a part of Marine Serre's campaign for its underwear collection, Borderline. Later on, Tommy Cash appeared in advertisements for Diesel, and was photographed by Marili Andre. He also appeared in campaign video for American brand Brigade, promoted the Big Sock sleeping bag. The same year Estonian rapper appeared in "Join The Flip Side with Tommy Cash" campaign for the Samsung Galaxy A52s 5G, along with a pop-up concert in Tallinn, on 13 September 2023. In 2023, Tommy Cash appeared in the PTV Group and Deutsche Bahn's "Mobility is a Human Ride" video campaign.

== Discography ==
=== Studio albums ===
Title	Details	Peak position
Title	Details	EST
Euroz Dollaz Yeniz	Released: 1 November 2014; Label: Self-released; Formats: Digital download, streaming	*
¥€$	Released: 30 November 2018; Label: Self-released; Formats: Digital download, streaming	1
"*" denotes that the chart did not exist at that time.

=== Extended plays ===
Title	Details
C.R.E.A.M.	Released: 8 July 2014; Label: Music Kickup; Formats: Digital download, streaming
Moneysutra	Released: 9 April 2021; Label: Self-released; Formats: Digital download, streaming
High Fashion	Released: 20 November 2024; Label: Self-released; Formats: Digital download, streaming
Boyband (with Joost Klein and Käärijä)	Released: 11 May 2026; Label: Self-released; Formats: Digital download, streaming

=== Singles ===
==== As lead artist ====
Title	Year	Peak chart positions										Album or EP
Title	Year	EST Dom.	EST Air.	FIN	GER	ITA	LAT Stream.	NLD	NOR	SWE	SWI	Album or EP
"Guez Whoz Bak"	2013	*	*	—	—	—	*	—	—	—	—	C.R.E.A.M.
"Alien Tears"	2014	*	*	—	—	—	*	—	—	—	—	Non-album singles
"Winaloto"	2016	25	*	—	—	—	—	—	—	—	—	Non-album singles
"Surf"	2017	*	*	—	—	—	—	—	—	—	—	Non-album singles
"Rawr"	2017	*	*	—	—	—	—	—	—	—	—	Non-album singles
"Pussy Money Weed"	2018	3	*	—	—	—	—	—	—	—	—	PC Music Volume 3
"Little Molly"	2018	6	*	—	—	—	—	—	—	—	—	Non-album single
"X-ray"	2018	4	*	—	—	—	—	—	—	—	—	¥€$
"Sdubid"	2019	3	*	—	—	—	—	—	—	—	—	Non-album singles
"Mute (by Maison Margiela)"	2021	*	*	—	—	—	—	—	—	—	—	Non-album singles
"Zuccenberg" (featuring $uicideboy$ and Diplo)	2021	*	*	—	—	—	—	—	—	—	—	Moneysutra
"Benz-Dealer" (featuring Quebonafide)	2021	*	*	—	—	—	—	—	—	—	—	Non-album singles
"Ferrari" (with Riff Raff and Salvatore Ganacci)	2023	*	—	—	—	—	—	—	—	—	—	Non-album singles
"Tango" (featuring bbno$)	2024	*	—	—	—	—	—	—	—	—	—	Non-album singles
"Untz Untz"	2024	*	—	—	—	—	—	—	—	—	—	Non-album singles
"Espresso Macchiato" (solo or remix with Tony Effe)	2024	*	1	3	12	53	2	9	5	3	2	Non-album singles
"OK"	2025	*	32	—	—	—	—	—	—	—	—	Non-album singles
"Figaro"	2026	*	26	—	—	—	—	—	—	—	—	Non-album singles
"—" denotes a recording that did not chart or was not released in that territory. "*" denotes that the chart did not exist at that time.

==== As featured artist ====
Title	Year	Peak chart positions				Album or EP
Title	Year	BEL (FL)	FIN	POL Stream.	POL Billb.	Album or EP
"Give Me Your Money" (Little Big featuring Tommy Cash)	2016	—	—	*		Funeral Rave
"Apel" (Kinder Malo and Pimp Flaco featuring Tommy Cash)	2016	—	—	*		Non-album singles
"Cry" (Ic3peak featuring Tommy Cash)	2017	—	—	*		Non-album singles
"Piece by Piece" (Audio Opera featuring Project Pat, Antwon, Tommy Cash, and Rich Boy)	2017	—	—	*		Isolation Room
"Who" (Modeselektor featuring Tommy Cash)	2019	— (Note: "Who" did not enter the official Belgian Ultratop 100 charts, but appeared on the Flanders Ultratip Bubbling Under 50 chart.)	—	*		Who Else
"Forever in My Debt" (Borgore featuring Tommy Cash)	2019	—	—	*		The Art of Glory
"Nude" (Boys Noize featuring Tommy Cash)	2021	—	—	*		+/-
"Turn It Up" (Oliver Tree and Little Big featuring Tommy Cash)	2021	—	—	*		Welcome to the Internet
"Check1" (Umru featuring Tommy Cash and 645AR)	2022	—	—	*	—	Comfort Noise
"It's Crazy, It's Party" (Käärijä featuring Tommy Cash)	2024	—	4	—	—	People's Champion
"Ca$h Ready" (Mata featuring Tommy Cash and Jeleel)	2024	—	—	24	22	CBW Mixtape 2
"Ass & Titties" (Salvatore Ganacci featuring Tommy Cash)	2024	—	—	—	—	Sometimes I Cry; When I'm Alone
"—" denotes a recording that did not chart or was not released in that territory. "*" denotes that the chart did not exist at that time.

=== Other charted songs ===
Title	Year	Peak chart positions	Album or EP
Title	Year	EST Dom.	Album or EP
"Mona Lisa"	2018	11	¥€$
"Brazil"	2018	15	¥€$
"Vegetarian"	2018	16	¥€$
"Horse B4 Porsche"	2018	10	¥€$
"Dostoyevsky"	2018	16	¥€$
"Black Jeans, White Shirt"	2018	14	¥€$
"Cool 3D World"	2018	12	¥€$
"Not Care"	2018	18	¥€$

=== Other collaborations ===
Title	Year	Peak chart positions	Album or EP
Title	Year	FRA	Album or EP
"Exodus" (Yeezuz2020 featuring Tommy Cash)	2015	—	Exodus
"Volkswagen Passat" (DJ Oguretz featuring Tommy Cash)	2015	—	Power
"Delicious" (Charli XCX featuring Tommy Cash)	2017	—	Pop 2
"Follow Me" (Little Big featuring Tommy Cash)	2018	—	Antipositive, Pt. 2
"Impec" (Lorenzo featuring Tommy Cash and Vladimir Cauchemar)	2019	48	Sex in the City
"Click" (Charli XCX featuring Kim Petras and Tommy Cash)	2019	—	Charli
"Heartbass" (Salvatore Ganacci featuring Tommy Cash)	2020	—	Boycycle
"xXXi_wud_nvrstøp_ÜXXx (Remix)" (100 Gecs featuring Tommy Cash and Hannah Diamond)	2020	—	1000 Gecs and the Tree of Clues
"Alright" (A. G. Cook featuring Tommy Cash)	2020	—	7G
"Whisk It Up" (Yung Gravy and Dillon Francis featuring Tommy Cash)	2022	—	Cake and Cognac
"United by Music" (with Joost Klein)	2025	—	Unity
"2000" (with Joost Klein and Käärijä)	2026	—	Boyband
"—" denotes a recording that did not chart or was not released in that territory.

== Videography ==
=== Music videos ===
As lead artist

List of music videos as lead artist, with other performers, directors, album title, and showing year released
Title	Performer(s)	Director(s)	Album	Year	Ref.
"Guez Whoz Bak"	—N/a	Janar Aronija	C.R.E.A.M. EP	2013	
"Euroz Dollaz Yeniz"	—N/a	Janar Aronija	Euroz Dollaz Yeniz	2014	
"ProRapSuperstar"	—N/a	Sander Joon, Mikk Mägi	Euroz Dollaz Yeniz	2015	
"Leave Me Alone"	—N/a	Tommy Cash, Anna Himma	Euroz Dollaz Yeniz	2015	
"Winaloto"	—N/a	Tommy Cash, Anna Himma	Non-album single	2016	
"Surf"	—N/a	Anna Himma, Tommy Cash	Non-album single	2017	
"Pussy Money Weed"	—N/a	Anna Himma, Tommy Cash	Non-album single	2018	
"Little Molly"	—N/a	Anna Himma, Tommy Cash	Non-album single	2018	
"X-Ray"	—N/a	Anna Himma, Tommy Cash	¥€$	2018	
"Sdubid"	—N/a	Anna Himma, Tommy Cash	Non-album single	2019	
"Racked"	—N/a	Anna Himma	Moneysutra EP	2021	
"Benz Dealer"	Quebonafide	Sebastian Panczyk	Non-album single	2021	
"Tango"	bbno$	Tommy Cash	Non-album single	2024	

As featured artist

List of music videos as featured artist, with directors, album title, and showing year released
Title	Performer(s)	Director(s)	Album	Year	Ref.
"Flipperi"	Adi L Hasla; Aito Mäkki	MVP74	Habiturientti	2015	
"Give Me Your Money"	Little Big	Ilya Prusikin, Alina Pasok, Tommy Cash	Funeral Rave	2015	
"Apel"	Kinder Malo; Pimp Flaco	Leon Santana	Non-album single	2016	
"Who"	Modeselektor	Chehad Abdallah	Who Else	2019	
"Nude"	Boys Noize	Sus Boy	Nude / Xpress Yourself EP, +/-	2021	
"Turn It Up"	Oliver Tree; Little Big	Alina Pasok, Ilya Prusikin, Oliver Tree	Welcome To The Internet EP	2021	
"check1"	umru 645AR	Sam Rolfes	Comfort Noise	2021	
"It's Crazy, It's Party"	Käärijä	Karim Sahebin (kaverikarim)	Non-album single	2023	
"Ass & Titties"	Salvatore Ganacci	Mistre Tesfaye; Joel Nkímyá	Non-album single	2024	

Guest appearances

List of music videos as guest appearances, with directors, album title, and showing year released
Title	Performer(s)	Director(s)	Album	Year	Ref.
"Boys"	Charli XCX	Charli XCX, Sarah McColgan	Non-album single	2017	
"S*ck My D*ck 2020"	Little Big	Alina Pasok, Ilya Prusikin	Non-album single	2020	

== Awards and nominations ==
Year	Award	Category	Nominee(s)	Result	Ref.
2025	UK Music Video Awards	"Untz Untz"	Best Dance / Electronic Video – International	Nominated	
2025	Eurovision Awards	Choreo Monarch	Himself	Nominated	
2025	Eurovision Awards	Music Video	Himself	Nominated	
2025	Berlin Music Video Awards	Most Trashy	"Untz Untz"	Won	
2025	Berlin Music Video Awards	Best Concept	"Espresso Macchiato"	Nominated	

== Notes ==
Awards and achievements
Preceded by 5miinust and Puuluup with "(Nendest) narkootikumidest ei tea me (küll) midagi"	Estonia in the Eurovision Song Contest; 2025	Succeeded by Vanilla Ninja with "Too Epic to Be True"
