= ¥€$ =

2018 album by Tommy Cash

Studio album by Tommy Cash
- Released: 30 November 2018
- Length: 37:49
- Language: English; Portuguese; Russian
- Producer: Amnesia Scanner; A. G. Cook; Boys Noize; Danny L Harle

Tommy Cash chronology
Euroz Dollaz Yeniz (2014)	¥€$ (2018)	Moneysutra (2021)

Singles from ¥€$
- 1. "X-Ray" Released: 22 November 2018

¥€$ (pronounced Yes) is the second album by Estonian rapper, singer and conceptual artist Tommy Cash. It was released on 30 November 2018. The album was preceded by the single "X-Ray" and features collaborations with Rick Owens and MC Bin Laden.

== Singles ==
"X-Ray" was the only single released from the album. Produced by A. G. Cook and Danny L Harle, it was unveiled a week before the album on November 22, 2018. Its music video was self-directed along Anna-Lisa Himma and features Cash as a cult leader. It has been compared to the film The Holy Mountain. Cook and Russian model Sasha Trautvein also made a cameo.

== Reception ==
Professional ratings
Review scores
Source	Rating
Clash	8/10 stars
Highsnobiety	4.5/5 stars
Jenesaispop	7/10 stars

Laura Copley from Clash described the album as "a complete sensory overload", also praising the tracks "Brazil" and "Cool 3D World". The latter was named "[it]s strongest offering." She ranked the album with 4 points out of 5, naming "Vegetarian" the weakest track. Bianca Guilione from Highsnobiety aided the album's production, noticing the incorporation of "nostalgia-inducing" electronic sub-genres and describing Boys Noize's work as "blown-out bass bliss". The publication gave the album a rating of 4.5 points out of 5. For Jenesaispop, Jordi Bardají criticized the use of awful phrases, comparing its lyricism to a more innocent version of Cupcakke while also suggesting its sound could be what Lady Gaga's then-upcoming record Chromatica was going to offer. Highlighting the songs "Brazil", "Horse B4 Porsche", "Mona Lisa" and the single "X-Ray", the album got a 7 out of 10 qualification. The author dubbed Cash as a necessary political subject on the music landscape.

== Track listing ==
No.	Title	Writer(s)	Producer(s)	Length
1.	"Wait a Minute!" (Intro)	Tommy Cash; Ville Petteri Haimala	Amnesia Scanner	2:41
2.	"Mona Lisa" (featuring Rick Owens)	Cash; Alexander Guy Cook; Rick Owens	Cook	5:24
3.	"X-Ray"	Cash; Daniel Eisner Harle; Caroline Polachek	Danny L Harle; Cook^{[a]}	3:48
4.	"Brazil" (featuring MC Bin Laden)	Cash; Alexander Ridha; MC Bin Laden	Boys Noize	2:42
5.	"Vegetarian"	Cash; Ridha	Boys Noize	4:08
6.	"Horse B4 Porsche"	Cash; Cook	Cook	3:25
7.	"Dostoyevsky"	Cash; Cook	Cook	2:40
8.	"Black Jeans, White T-Shirt"	Cash; Ridha	Boys Noize	2:38
9.	"Cool 3D World"	Cash; Cook; Charli XCX	Cook	3:41
10.	"Not Care"	Cash; Ridha	Boys Noize	4:01
11.	"Yes or No?" (Outro)	Cash; Haimala	Amnesia Scanner	2:41
Total length:				37:49

Notes

- ^{^[a]}signifies an additional producer
- All songs are stylised in uppercase letters.
- "X-Ray" features additional vocals from Caroline Polachek.
- "Cool 3D World" features additional vocals from Charli XCX and Hannah Diamond.

Sample credits

- "X-Ray" interpolates elements of "This Is How We Do It", as performed and written by Plus System.
- "Horse B4 Porsche" contains a sample of "Mood" as performed by Carlie Hanson, written by Hanson, Leland and Cook.
- "Dostoyevsky" contains a sample of "Full Circle" as performed and written by Easyfun.
