= The Past of the Future =

Studio album by Karol Mikloš
- Released: May 20, 2008 (SK) (Note: The sources differ – iTunes reports Tuesday, May 20, 2008 as the release date, while the official websites of both record labels, each Wednesday, the 21st.); June 2, 2008 (CZ)
- Recorded: Garage One, Trenčín, SK
- Genre: Alt-rock; indie pop
- Length: 38:34
- Label: Deadred (SK) (#DR-L009); Starcastic (CZ) (#STC009); Kickup (download)
- Producer: Matúš Homola; Mikloš Co-producer: Andrej Gmuca

Karol Mikloš chronology
Vis-à-vis (2002)	The Past of the Future (00000001)

Singles from The Past of the Future
- 1. "Insane"; 2. "Leaving for England"; 3. "You Never Listen"; 4. "In the Bubble"; 5. "Apocalyptical"

The Past of the Future is the third studio album by Slovak musician Karol Mikloš, released on May 20, 2008. Issued by Deadred Records, the set was distributed in the neighboring Czech Republic through Starcastic Records, and virtually by Music Kickup. As such, the work followed the pattern of his previous release Vis-à-vis (2002), in which Mikloš began his gradual transition into the electronic circles. Unlike its predecessor, The Past of the Future featured a live instrumentation.

Mikloš reprised his collaboration with Andrej Monček for one song, "You Never Listen", promoted also on a single, which became his highest charting outcome on the SK Rádio Top 50 to date, debuting and peaking at number twenty-six. The rest of the compositions were written mostly by Mikloš himself and entered the top-forty of the component airplay list, with the exception of "Insane" from 2006. As a result, the album received two nominations for the annual Radio Head Awards, presented by Rádio FM.

Upon release, The Past of the Future earned from favorable to positive reviews from music journalists, with many of them rating the work as the finest full-length effort recorded by Mikloš, or rather his most mature album until then. Although the set itself didn't enter the record charts, Czech Radio Wave listed the title as the Album of the Week for the week beginning June 2, 2008.

== Reception ==
Professional ratings
Review scores
Source	Rating
EXITmusic.org	(favorable)
FreeMusic.cz	70/100%
Hudba.sk	(positive)
MusicServer.cz	7/10
The Prague Post	(positive)
Rock & Pop	(favorable)
SME	(favorable)
SpaceBoss.net	(positive)
UNI	(positive)
Žurnál	(positive)

=== Critical response ===
The Past of the Future generated mainly positive music critics with the earliest being published by the Czech media. Independent web portal SpaceBoss.net, introduced the final result as "more mature, more colorful and more genuine than anything [he] recorded so far." Along with complimenting Mikloš for lyrical and vocal contributions, the website attributed much of his album's sound potential to those by Matúš Homola and Andrej Gmuca. Tadeáš Haager from alternative Radio Wave station, acknowledged singer for managing to learn from mistakes in the past, referring to a monotonous sound of his previous outputs as observed by local journalists once upon a time. While stressing artist's credibility to perform also in English, Haager concluded that "listening to Mikloš doesn't mean to hear some sonic boom of a pioneer and trailblazer, it is more likely an incredibly skilled tribute to [his] foreign models with no need to be ashamed for and to dissociate self from them."

A similar opinion was shared by Boris Filantrop of EXITmusic.org, an SK music-based web. "In terms of musical arrangement, no revolution can take place", he wrote. In contrast to Haager though, Filantrop himself reproached Mikloš for a somewhat awkward English pronunciation, summarizing his notes with: "The Past of the Future with no export intentions, thus, has been quite obviously meant for audiences located in Central Europe, preferably in there, where the world music could be forty years seen only from behind the Iron Curtain. And it's a good album." Also Pavel Zelinka from Czech UNI that covers local culture life on a monthly basis, cited Mikloš'es wording as the weakest spot whereas pointing out on his, more or less, remarkable lyrics. American freelancer Darrell Jónsson who interviewed musician for The Prague Post, would find shocking, for a change, finding out "[he] is not British". Describing his production "distinct and elegant", Jónsson saw his native limits beneficial in fact. Juraj Cagáň from Hudba.sk, part of search engine Zoznam.sk, commended singer's language skills. Yet, on the other hand, Cagáň also declared that his songs work better when they are sung in his mother tongue, appealing on "[his] very intimate and distinctive vocal".

According to Jaroslav Špulák of Rock & Pop magazine, an otherwise "interesting work" is good enough to be praised for, but it lacks an identity as whole. "At the same time [it] quickly runs into an all out interchangeability", stated the music expert. Oliver Rehák from mainstream periodical SME graded the overall endeavor to be standard of his own, and so did economical Profit actually. In addition, the latter branded the set as "way well done". Maxim Horovic of streaming server FreeMusic.cz, he considered impossible as well unimportant to classify Mikloš'es format on the local scene and paid attention to the album's composition instead. Dan Hájek from MusicServer.cz, labelled the product as "a fair option for pop", adding "[it] is a worked out sculpture of [his] talent." Zuzana Husárová from now ceased Žurnál weekly with focus on social and political issues in SK, was most impressed by depth of the album's testimony, comparing his songs to "leaves [he] throws down off himself. Leaves falling from the past to the future and pouring these lands into one."

=== Commercial performance ===
The album release didn't enter Top 50 Prodejní, an official chart effective for both Czechia and Slovakia, formerly the countries of a common federal state. However four out of five promotional recordings covered by some of the SK radio stations, appeared on the local component Rádio Top 50 chart, such as "Leaving for England" at number thirty-three, "You Never Listen" at position twenty-six, "In the Bubble" at number forty and "Apocalyptical" peaking at number thirty.

== Track listings ==
All lyrics are written by Mikloš with English language-supervision by Alan Dykstra

No.	Title	Music	Featured artist	Length
1.	"On Fire"	Mikloš		3:19
2.	"You Never Listen"	Andrej Monček		3:49
3.	"Insane"	Mikloš		3:33
4.	"Still on Your Side"	Mikloš	Radmila Kvasničková	4:27
5.	"Get a Little Wild"	Mikloš		4:28
6.	"In the Bubble"	Mikloš		2:49
7.	"A Note"	Mikloš		2:59
8.	"Leaving for England"	Mikloš		3:07
9.	"Apocalyptical"	Mikloš		3:49
10.	"Not Much Left to Do Wrong Now"	Mikloš		5:04
Total length:				38:34

== Credits and personnel ==
Management

- Recording studio – Garage One (now Men at Sound), Trenčín, Slovakia
- Publishing – Deadred Records (SK) • Starcastic Records (Czech Republic) • Music Kickup (download, reissue)
- Distribution – Fluidum Design, Trenčín, SK • Starcastic, Prague, CZ

Production

- Writers – Mikloš (music and lyrics) • Andrej Monček (music) • Alan Dykstra (additional lyrics)
- Mastering – Soundshine, Myjava, SK
- Production and mixing – Matúš Homola and Mikloš (as Garage One) • Andrej Gmuca (additional)

Personnel

- Vocals – Mikloš
- Musical instruments – Mikloš, Gmuca, Homola
- Photography – Slávka S.
- Cover art – Ria Bobotová, Art Frame, Trenčín, SK • Fluidum Design, Trenčín, SK (supervision)
- Graphic design – Tomáš Brousil, Suitcase Type Foundry, Prague, CZ (type)

== Chart performance ==
=== Singles ===
Year	Single	Chart
Year	Single	Rádio Top 50
2008	"Leaving for England"	33
2008	"You Never Listen"	26
2008	"In the Bubble"	40
2009	"Apocalyptical"	30

== Awards ==
Year	Nominated work	Award	Category	Result	
2008	The Past of the Future	Radio Head Awards	Audience Choice	Nominated	(Note: Lost in favor of Bliiizko (Slnko Records, #SR 0025) by Noisecut.)
2008	The Past of the Future	Radio Head Awards	Critics Choice	Nominated	(Note: Lost in favor of Rozhľadňa (Slnko Records, #SR 0021) by Ján Boleslav Kladivo.)
