= Vis-à-vis (album) =

Studio album by Karol Mikloš
- Released: October 21, 2002 (SK)
- Recorded: Mikloš'es home (1999–2002); Sedis Studio (April–October 2001); IMI Studio (February 2001); Exponent Studio (June 2002)
- Genre: Alt-rock; indie pop
- Length: 49:24
- Label: Millenium Records (#834 015–4)
- Producer: Andrej Monček; Mikloš; Roman Hlubina

Karol Mikloš chronology
The Same Mist Here (1997)	Vis-à-vis (2002)	The Past of the Future (2008)

Singles from Vis-à-vis
- 1. "Všetko, čo smieme chcieť" 2. "Celý"; 3. "Where You Meet Yourself"; 4. "Uspávanka"

Vis-à-vis is the second studio album by Slovak musician Karol Mikloš, issued via Millenium Records on October 21, 2002. Based on available music reviews, the work met with mixed to positive commentaries.

== Reception ==
=== Critical response ===
Professional ratings
Review scores
Source	Rating
SME	(positive)
&MusiQ	5/7 stars
FreeMusic.cz	(mixed)

Vis-à-vis spawned miscellaneous reactions among music journalists, with moderately prevailing positive. Daniel Baláž of SME commented that "an intelligent pop music established on oddly set up chords to old-fashioned melodic songwriting [it] is simply of his own". Seeing some resemblance to Miroslav Žbirka and Ladislav Lučenič, the author in general acknowledged Mikloš'es musical direction, including his deliberate and shy performance in public. Jaroslav Špulák from &MusiQ, formerly Rock & Pop magazine, emphasized the album's mood, and inner drive as well as its good production which "compete with the rest European recordings in the mainstream ranking excellently".

Other critics such as Pavel Seifert of FreeMusic.cz, were less enthusiastic. He concluded in his review: "Having own sound and style is a potential prerequisite for the success of any performer, but only when they make an effort in cultivating it. Songs [by Mikloš] do have their sound and style. The[ir] stroke of fate is however, that due to an identical pattern you come to the feeling at the end of the CD as if you were listening to the same track ever since.

=== Commercial performance ===
The album release didn't enter record charts, nor did any of the released singles.

== Track listings ==
All lyrics are written by Mikloš.

No.	Title	Music	Featured artist	Length
1.	"Všetko, čo smieme chcieť" (in Slovak)	Andrej Monček • Mikloš		5:31
2.	"Odznova" (in Slovak)	Monček • Mikloš		3:42
3.	"Celý" (in Slovak)	Monček • Mikloš		3:45
4.	"Uspávanka" (in Slovak)	Monček • Mikloš		3:56
5.	"Bez slov" (in Slovak)	Monček • Mikloš		3:54
6.	"Lunchbreak" (Interlude)	Monček • Mikloš	Emília Lokšenincová	2:45
7.	"Can't Have Both"	Monček • Mikloš		3:54
8.	"Where You Meet Yourself"	Monček • Mikloš		3:58
9.	"Precious Wave"	Monček • Mikloš		5:08
10.	"Right Until Now"	Monček • Mikloš		2:49
11.	"End of the Story"	Monček • Mikloš		3:53
12.	"How Long"	Mikloš		6:09
Total length:				49:24

Music videos
No.	Title	Music	Director	Length
13.	"Celý"	Monček • Mikloš	Branislav Špaček	3:33
14.	"Tomorrow"	Mikloš	Branislav Špaček	3:11
Total length:				56:08

== Credits and personnel ==
Management

- Recording studio – Mikloš'es home, Trenčín • Sedis Studio, Topoľčany • IMI Studio, Bratislava • Exponent Studio, Hlohovec, Slovakia
- Publishing – Millenium Records & Publishing, Bratislava, SK

Production

- Writers – Andrej Monček (music) • Mikloš (music and lyrics)
- Mastering – Sedis Studio • Mikloš'es home
- Production and mixing – Monček • Mikloš • Roman Hlubina
- Programming – Monček • Mikloš
- Engineering – Ján Došek
- Press – GZ Digital Media (now GZ Media), Loděnice, Czech Republic

Personnel

- Lead vocals – Mikloš
- Backing vocals – Emília Lokšenincová • Second Nature
- Musical instruments – Second Nature
- Guitars – Mikloš and Hlubina (acoustic, twelve-string, electric) • Monček (acoustic) • Marián Králik (bass)
- Drums – František Kraus
- Synthesizers – Monček • Mikloš
- Photography – Ivana • Ján Čajda • Rado D. • Vrbkin
- Cover art – Mikloš
- Graphic design – Vladimir Yurkovic

== Awards ==
Year	Nominated work	Award	Category	Result
2002	Vis-à-vis	Aurel Awards	Best Male Vocal Performance	Nominated
