= IC3PEAK =

Russian experimental electronic band

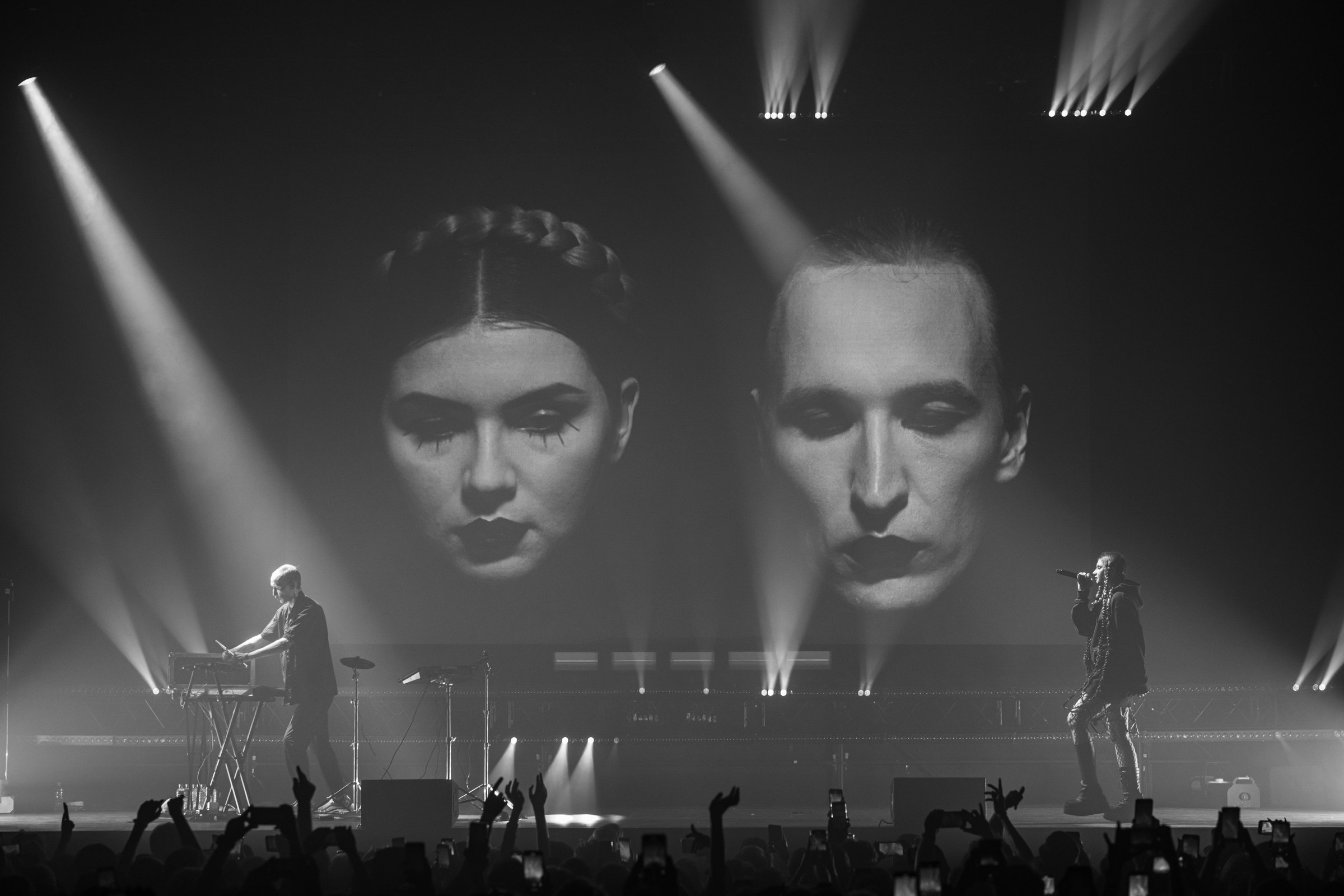
- IC3PEAK concert

Background information
- Origin: Moscow, Russia
- Genres: Witch house, experimental hip hop, electronica
- Years active: 2013–present
- Members: Anastasia Kreslina; Nikolay Kostilev

IC3PEAK is a Russian electronic music duo that was founded in 2013. It consists of Anastasia Kreslina and Nikolay Kostilev. They are characterized by the political undertones in their music, particularly criticizing the Russian government. Their political views and lyrics have led to censorship of their music in 2019. Their effects in mainstream media led to outpouring support throughout the West, and in Russia.

== History ==
=== Origins ===
According to the duo, October 19, 2013 is considered to be the foundation date of IC3PEAK.

From the very beginning of the project the distinctive features of IC3PEAK's work were a mixture of musical genres, a simultaneous emphasis on both audio and visual components, and lyrics that dealt with taboo topics such as death. Both artists characterize the initial period of their work as “audiovisual terrorism”. In 2014, they released the EP Substances, their first project. The entire EP was written in English. The visual design was done by Anastasia and Nikolai themselves. Shortly after, the video for the song "Ether" was presented to the public, being the first video work of IC3PEAK.

=== Gaining popularity abroad ===
From the first days of its existence the project gained popularity outside of Russia. In 2014, after the release of their second EP Vacuum, IC3PEAK performed at their first overseas concerts in European cities such as Bordeaux, Paris, Riga, Prague, and Helsinki. Two years later, in 2016, the project performed in South America. During their stay in Brazil, the duo partially filmed their music video for the song "Go With The Flow". To this day, the IC3PEAK project continues to successfully tour abroad.

=== Russian lyrics ===
On November 3, 2017, IC3PEAK released their first album in Russian, Сладкая Жизнь (Sladkaya Zhizn', “Sweet Life”) and the music video for the song Грустная Сука (Grustnaya Suka, "Sad Bitch") which quickly became a hit. The video has 78 million views on YouTube as of February 2024.

In the duo's earlier work their vocals performed the role of an "instrument". However, in Russian-language texts the semantic component prevails and references to Russian folk art are emphasized. Riding with the flow of their increased popularity in their homeland, the duo released another Russian-language longplay named СКАЗКА (Skazka, “Fairy Tale") on September 28, 2018. It included new videos made for the compositions Сказка and Смерти Больше Нет (Smerti Bol'she Nyet, "Death No More"). The video for the song Смерти Больше Нет is IC3PEAK's most viewed music video - it has upwards of 145 million views on YouTube as of April 2023. The band's third album in Russian called До Свидания (Do Svidaniya, "Goodbye") was released on April 24, 2020. In 2022, the duo released the English- and Russian-language album Kiss OF Death which features tracks in English, Russian, and mixed English and Russian.

=== 2018 tour and repression attempts by authorities ===
The second Russian-language album by IC3PEAK named Сладкая Жизнь and, in particular, the video for Смерти Больше Нет had wide political resonance. Some conservative public figures protested the video as an insult to law enforcement structures and to the Russian authorities. They also claimed the video contained calls to suicide, which, according to the authorities, could have an impact on the duo's underage fans. The Russian security forces began to target IC3PEAK's next planned tour. According to IC3PEAK, people calling themselves representatives of the security forces made threatening calls to concert venues throughout Russia, causing them to refuse to host the duo's concerts. The performance in Novosibirsk on December 1, 2018 became the peak of that confrontation. On that day, the members of IC3PEAK and the local concert organizers were detained while exiting the train at Novosibirsk Central Railway Station. After a series of threats, interrogations, and 3 hours of detention, the police, under public pressure (which included Western media), were forced to release the artists without drawing up protocols. The concert took place at an alternative venue. After a series of canceled concerts, a number of musicians and public figures around the world expressed their active support for IC3PEAK and their opposition to art censorship in Russia.

== Members ==
- Anastasia Kreslina (Анастасия Креслина) - vocals
- Nikolay Kostilev (Николай Костылев) - all instrumentals/production

== Discography ==
=== Albums ===
- IC3PEAK (2015)
- より多くの愛 (2015)
- Fallal (2016)
- Сладкая жизнь (Sladkaya zhizn) (2017)
- Сказка (Skazka) (2018)
- До свидания (Do svidaniya) (2020)
- Kiss of Death (2022)
- Coming Home (2025)

=== EP ===
- Substances (2014)
- Vacuum (2014)

=== Singles ===
- "Ellipse" (2014) / Electronica Records
- "I’ll Be Found" (remixes) (2014)
- "Really Really" (2014)
- "Kawaii" / "Warrior" (2016) / Manimal Vinyl
- "Kto" (2017) / Self-released
- "Monster" (2017) / Manimal Vinyl
- "This World is Sick" (2018)
- "Fairytale / Skazka" (2018)
- "Death No More / Smerti bolshe nyet" (2018)
- "Boo-Hoo / Plak-plak" (2020)
- "Trrst" (featuring ZillaKami) (2020)
- "Vampir" (featuring Oliver Sykes of Bring Me the Horizon) (2021)
- "Cherv / Worm" (with Kim Dracula) (2022)
- "Dead but Pretty" (2022)
- "Kiss of Death" (2022)

== Visuals ==
Throughout its existence, the members of the IC3PEAK project have been producing visual design and video content by themselves. Anastasia and Nikolay write scripts, direct, edit and process their videos, take photographs and create cover art for releases by themselves.

=== Videos ===
Year	Title	Russian title
2014	Ether	
2014	Vacuum	
2016	Go With the Flow	
2017	Kawaii Warrior	
2017	So Safe	
2017	Make You Cry	
2017	Sad Bitch	Грустная сука
2018	This World is Sick	
2018	Fairytale	Сказка
2018	Death No More	Смерти больше нет
2020	Marching	Марш
2020	Boo-Hoo	Плак-Плак
2022	Dead but Pretty	
2022	Kiss of Death	
2025	Where Is My Home?	Где мой дом?

== Awards and nominations ==
- Jager Music Awards Winners, Electronics (2017)
- Winners of the Golden Gargoyle Award for Best Experimental Project of the Year (2017)
- Anastasia Kreslina and Nikolay Kostilev became nominees for the "30 under 30" award held by Forbes magazine
- Nomination at the Berlin Music Video Awards in 2019, in category Best Low Budget for their work 'Smerti Bolshe Net'

== Personal life ==
Anastasia and Nikolai keep an extremely private lifestyle and rarely appear in public. It is not known for certain who they are to each other – in interviews, the musicians avoid giving a direct answer to this question. They also mention that they live in a wooden hut, away from city life, and this helps them to fully concentrate on their creative work process.
