= Gab Bois =

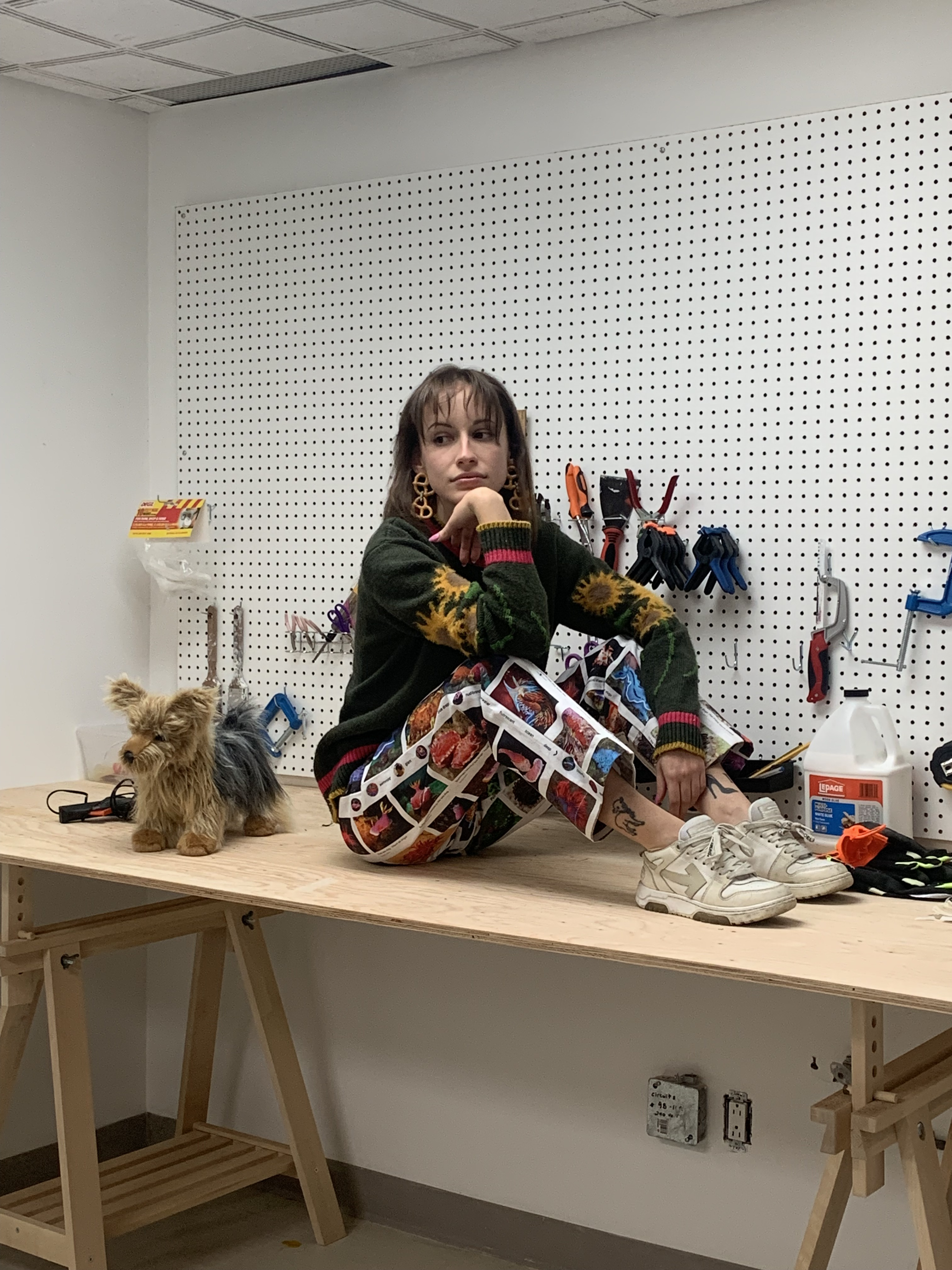
Bois in 2023.

Gab Bois is a Canadian artist. She creates objects out of unusual materials.

== Early life and education ==
Bois grew up in Montréal. As an only child, she found herself drawn to arts and crafts. Her father is a painter. She often would sit in his basement studio and watch him paint. He taught her about art history. She credits him with guiding her to her eventual career. She was active on Tumblr as a teenager.

== Career ==
Bois went to college for a degree to become an elementary school teacher. One-and-a-half years into her degree, she started posting her photography on Instagram. Her work got so much attention that she decided to pause her degree and pursue an artistic career.

In 2018, Bois posted an image of a hot pink Croc heel which she made with a knockoff Croc from a dollar store and a second-hand stripper heel which was inspired by a Croc created by Balenciaga.

Bois created a bra out of sunny side up eggs for easter-inspired post.

In 2020, Bois published New Album: An Artist Book. The book was created in partnership with Anteism Books, an independent publisher in Montreal. It is a record of the first three years of her work.

In 2023, Gab Bois collaborated with department store La Samaritaine Paris and Atelier Devineau to create their holiday display and campaign centerpiece: a gigantic chandelier crafted from 1,800 individual candies and 70 candy canes.

In late 2023, Bois released a ready-to-wear collection, Canapés. In 2024, she released more items as part of Canapés, including a square-toed pair of sandals with a lifelike clementine heel.
