= The Same Mist Here =

Studio album by Karol Mikloš
- Released: November 13, 1997 (SK)
- Genre: Alt-rock; indie pop
- Length: 38:03
- Label: G.A. Records (#GR 0013 2 311)
- Producer: Ladislav Lučenič

Karol Mikloš chronology
Karol Mikloš (1996)	The Same Mist Here (1997)	Vis-à-vis (2002)

Singles from The Same Mist Here
- 1. "Tomorrow"

The Same Mist Here is the debut studio album by Slovak musician Karol Mikloš, delivered by G.A. Records on November 13, 1997. Produced by Ladislav Lučenič, it featured a cover version of "Some Girls Are Bigger Than Others" by The Smiths, released on the set as a hidden track.

== Track listings ==
No.	Title	Length
1.	"Tomorrow"	3:14
2.	"Host"	2:33
3.	"So Devoutly"	3:04
4.	"London"	3:04
5.	"Rainy Club"	3:22
6.	"Disentwined"	3:35
7.	"This Gentleman"	2:50
8.	"There Is No Other Way"	2:51
9.	"Answer"	2:47
10.	"A Comforting Lie"	2:54
11.	"From the Back of Beyond"	4:01
12.	"Tears of Joy"	3:48
Total length:		38:03

Hidden track
No.	Title	Lyrics	Music	Length
13.	"Some Boys Are Bigger Than Others" (by The Smiths)	Steven Morrissey	John Maher	3:09
Total length:				41:12

== Awards ==
Year	Nominated work	Award	Category	Result
1997	The Same Mist Here	Grammy Slovakia Awards^{[A]}	Best Male Vocal Performance	Nominated
A Lučenič himself won the category of the Best Producer on the ZAI ceremony, among others also for his credits of "Tomorrow".
