= Karol Mikloš =

- Born: 1972 (age 53–54); Nová Dubnica, Czechoslovakia
- Education: Business administration (BSBA)
- Alma mater: VŠM, Trenčín (class of 1995)
- Occupations: Singer; songwriter; producer; translator
- Years active: 1992–present
- Musical career
- Genres: Alt-rock; indie pop; electronica; folktronica
- Instruments: Vocals; Guitars
- Labels: G.A.; Millenium (now Perfa); Deadred
- Website: karolmiklos.sk

Karol Mikloš (born 1972) is a Slovak recording artist. A former member of a gothic rock band known as Shellwoy (1992–1993), recorded his own self-titled demo EP in 1994. His full-length debut, The Same Mist Here (1997), saw its official results on Róbert Gregor's Agency – G.A. Records. The guitar-based work made under production by Ladislav Lučenič, spawned a Grammy Slovakia Award-nomination as the New Artist. Its electronic follow-up issued on Millennium Records, Vis-à-vis (2002), became a Best Male Vocal Performance-nominee in favor of local Aurel Awards. While The Past of the Future (2008) with a more acoustic sound, was nominated for so-called Radio Head Awards, for a change. Apart from performing and composing skills for his own, Mikloš has occasionally been involved in production, audio and mastering engineering, mixing and programming for fellow artists.

On the occasion of the 2015 Record Store Day, Mikloš issued his most recent release, "One Life More or Less".

== Discography ==
"Listening to Mikloš doesn't mean to hear some sonic boom of a pioneer and trailblazer, it is more likely an incredibly skilled tribute to foreign models with no need to be ashamed for and to dissociate self from them."

— Tadeáš Haager, Radio Wave, 2008.

Studio albums

- 1997: The Same Mist Here
- 2002: Vis-à-vis
- 2008: The Past of the Future
- 2017: Poisoned EP
- 2022: This Side of Town
- 2024: Nočné vlaky

== Awards ==
Apart from a number of nominations for domestic music awards, all received in response to his album releases, in the Czech Republic The Past of the Future was listed among the Radio Wave's Albums of the Week in June 2008.

Year	Nominated work	Award	Category	Result	
1997	The Same Mist Here	Grammy Slovakia Awards^{[A]}	Best New Artist	Nominated	
2002	Vis-à-vis	Aurel Awards	Best Male Vocal Performance	Nominated	
2008	The Past of the Future	Radio Head Awards	Audience Choice	Nominated	^{[B]}
2008	The Past of the Future	Radio Head Awards	Critics Choice	Nominated	^{[C]}
A Lučenič himself won the category of the Best Producer on the ZAI ceremony, among others also for his credits of "Tomorrow".; B Won Bliiizko (Slnko Records, #SR 0025) by Noisecut.; C Won Rozhľadňa (#SR 0021) by Ján Boleslav Kladivo.

== See also ==
- 8th ZAI Grammy Slovakia Awards
- 2nd Aurel Awards
