= One Life More or Less =

Single by Karol Mikloš
- B-side: "Remix"
- Released: April 18, 2015 (RSD)
- Recorded: Men at Sound, Trenčín, SK; Gargle & Expel, Dublin, IE
- Genre: Alt-rock; indie pop
- Length: 2:49 (Original version)
- Label: Deadred (SK) (#DR-031); Starcastic (CZ) (#STC-50)
- Songwriter(s): Mikloš; Alan Dykstra
- Producer(s): Matúš Homola; Mikloš Remix: Autumnist; Yellowbrilla

Karol Mikloš singles chronology
| "Apocalyptical" (2009) | "One Life More or Less" (2015) |

Audio sample
- "One Life More or Less": file; help

Music video
- "One Life More or Less" on YouTube

"One Life More or Less" is a 2015 song by the Slovak musician Karol Mikloš, released on the Record Store Day, on April 15, 2015. A re-recorded version of the track is to appear on 'Poisoned EP' scheduled for release on 20 February 2017.

== Credits and personnel ==
Management

- Recording studio – Men at Sound, Trenčín, Slovakia
- Publishing – Deadred Records (SK) • Starcastic Records (Czech Republic)
- Distribution – Wegart, Bratislava, SK • Starcastic, Prague, CZ

Production

- Writers – Mikloš (music and lyrics) • Alan Dykstra (lyrics)
- Mixing and mastering – Gargle & Expel, Dublin, Ireland (additional)
- Producers – Matúš Homola and Mikloš (as Men at Sound) • Autumnist and Yellowbrilla (remix)
- Dubplate – Vinyl-Lab Studio (Dubplate s.r.o.), Trenčín, SK

Personnel

- Vocals and musical instruments – Mikloš
- Saxophone – Peter Kohout (Chór vážskych muzikantov), Trenčín, SK
- Photography – Slávka Miklošová, Trenčín, SK
- Cover art – Martin Turzík, Fluidum Design, Trenčín, SK

== Track listings and formats ==
7", SK/CZ, #DR-031/STC-50

1. "One Life More or Less" – 2:49
2. "One Life More or Less" (Autumnist Remix) – 3:04

Download, SK/CZ, #DR-031/STC-50

1. "One Life More or Less" – 2:49
2. "One Life More or Less" (Autumnist Remix) – 3:04
3. "One Life More or Less" (Yellowbrilla Remix) – 3:04
