= Music Kickup =

Record label

- Type: Private
- Industry: Music industry
- Founded: 26 August 2011
- Founder: Mikael Bengtsson; Antti Silventoinen; Perttu Sutinen; Mikael Forstén
- Headquarters: Helsinki, FIN
- Area served: Worldwide
- Key people: Antti Silventoinen (CEO); Perttu Sutinen (COO); Mikael Forstén (Chairman); Jerry Jalava (CTO)
- Website: MusicKickup.com

Music Kickup is a cloud based record label for artists. The service was initially launched as Music Kickstarter, but it soon changed its name to Music KickUp. It is a community platform for musicians and music industry, to create, collaborate, and support their art. It allows to commercially publish any and everything they create, while retaining all rights.

== Roll-out plan ==
Music Kickup was launched at MIDEM in 2012 with a closed alpha release. A closed beta was released in Fall 2012 and public beta on 15 July 2013. The company aims at global coverage, but early launch focus has been in Europe – Nordics, Baltics, Germany, France, Spain and the UK.

== Business model ==
Music Kickup acts as a label cloud service for artists to use it as their own. Music Kickup handles all contracts, rights management, and industry connections – potentially leaving the artist to concentrate on their art. The cloud label offers them support typical to major labels and specialized tools for creating, collaborating and commercially publishing with global physical and digital distribution.

The artist or band can end the contract freely at will. Cutting ties with the cloud label will not involve any fines, and any created content can be taken elsewhere immediately, or in case of recent commercially release, after a short sales curfew.
